= 1984 San Diego Padres season =

Major League Baseball season

1984 San Diego Padres
- National League champions National League West champions
- League: National League
- Division: West
- Ballpark: Jack Murphy Stadium
- City: San Diego, California
- Record: 92–70 (.568)
- Divisional place: 1st
- Owners: Joan Kroc
- General managers: Jack McKeon
- Managers: Dick Williams
- Television: KCST; San Diego Cable Sports Network (Dave Campbell, Jerry Coleman, Bob Chandler, Ted Leitner)
- Radio: KFMB (AM) (Dave Campbell, Jerry Coleman); XEXX (Gustavo Lopez, Mario Thomas Zapiain)

The 1984 San Diego Padres season was the 16th season in franchise history. San Diego won the National League (NL) championship and advanced to the World Series, which they lost to the Detroit Tigers four games to one. The Padres were led by manager Dick Williams and third-year player Tony Gwynn, who won the NL batting title and finished third in voting for the NL Most Valuable Player Award.

In their first 15 seasons, the Padres had an overall won–lost record of 995–1372 for a .420 winning percentage, and finished with a winning record just once (1978). They had never finished higher than fourth in the National League West, and eight times they had finished in last place. However, they were coming off consecutive 81–81 seasons in Williams' two years as San Diego's manager. They won the NL West in 1984 with a 92–70 record, and set a then-franchise record in attendance, drawing nearly two million fans (1,983,904). They defeated the Chicago Cubs in the NLCS, three games to two, becoming the first NL team to win the pennant after being down 2–0. Steve Garvey was named the NLCS Most Valuable Player.

Owner Ray Kroc died on January 14, making this the Padres' first season under the sole ownership of Kroc's widow Joan. Joan Kroc would continue to own the team until 1990. This would be the final season that the team wore mustard yellow & chocolate brown uniforms, which had been in place since 1969, the year they joined the National League. They would switch to a more traditional buttoned down look with pinstripes the next season.

== Offseason ==
- October 21, 1983: Sandy Alomar Jr. was signed by the Padres as an amateur free agent.
- December 6, 1983: Joe Pittman and a player to be named later were traded by the Padres to the San Francisco Giants for Champ Summers. The Padres completed the deal by sending Tommy Francis (minors) to the Giants on December 7.
- December 7: Gary Lucas was traded by the Padres to the Montreal Expos as part of a three-team trade. The Expos sent Al Newman to the Padres, and the Chicago Cubs sent Carmelo Martínez, Craig Lefferts, and Fritzie Connally to the Padres. The Expos traded Scott Sanderson to the Cubs.
- January 6, 1984: Rich Gossage was signed as a free agent by the Padres.
- January 14: Owner Ray Kroc dies. Ownership passes to his wife, Joan B. Kroc.
- January 17: Rodney McCray was drafted by the Padres in the 9th round of the 1984 amateur draft.
- March 25: Second baseman Juan Bonilla waived.
- March 30: Dennis Rasmussen and a player to be named later were traded by the Padres to the New York Yankees for Graig Nettles. The Padres completed the deal by sending Darin Cloninger (minors) to the Yankees on April 26.

== Regular season ==
After spending $6 million to acquire free-agent first baseman Steve Garvey in 1983, the Padres signed free-agent reliever Goose Gossage to a five-year contract for $6.25 million in January 1984. The deal made Gossage the highest-salaried pitcher in baseball at the time. Manager Dick Williams, who had asked general manager Jack McKeon to obtain a strikeout-type reliever, declared that the acquisition made San Diego a playoff contender. Eight days after signing Gossage, Padres owner Ray Kroc died at the age of 81. The season was dedicated to his memory with the team wearing his initials, "RAK" on their jersey's left sleeve during the entire season. Ownership of the team passed to his wife, Joan Kroc.

In February, All-Star catcher Terry Kennedy underwent arthroscopic surgery on his left knee after being bothered by continuous inflammation since the middle of 1983. During spring training, Alan Wiggins was named the team's new second baseman over incumbent Juan Bonilla, who was subsequently waived. In a gamble to generate offense, Wiggins had been moved from the outfield to make room in left field for Carmelo Martínez, who was moved from first base after being acquired in the offseason from the Chicago Cubs. The Padres were hoping to bolster their starting outfield, which produced just 23 homers in 1983. The rookie Martinez and center fielder Kevin McReynolds, whose 140 at-bats during the prior season disqualified him from being considered a rookie in 1984, were hyped by the media as the M&M Boys, alluding to the Yankees' 1960s power-hitting duo of Mickey Mantle and Roger Maris. The two Padre outfielders along with Garvey, Nettles, and Kennedy supplied San Diego with five regulars who had the potential to hit at least 20 home runs. Third-year right fielder Tony Gwynn entered the season with a .302 lifetime batting average, the highest on the club. Gwynn, McReynolds, and Martinez formed the youngest outfield in the majors. Shortstop Garry Templeton was relieved of pain from a left knee that had bothered him for years and was expected to anchor the infield, especially with Wiggins moving to second base. Templeton was also projected to bat leadoff for the Padres, but he was dropped to No. 8 in the order after he took a spike to his right knee toward the end of spring training. Three days before the season opener, 39-year-old third baseman Graig Nettles, a San Diego native, approved a trade from the New York Yankees to the Padres. A left-handed batter who had hit 333 career home runs, he was open to platooning with incumbent Luis Salazar, although Nettles was expected to get the majority of playing time given the larger number of right-handed starting pitchers in the majors. Heading into the season, Williams' biggest concern was their pitching. The starters largely relied on finesse and off-speed pitches, and none of them had ever won more than 16 games.

The Padres won their first four games of the season, and were 9–2 before leaving on their first road trip. They were 18–11 before losing seven in a row, their longest losing streak of the season. The streak was snapped on May 17, when Wiggins tied an NL record with five stolen bases, and the club swiped a team record of seven in a 5–4 home win over Montreal. They were tied for first in the West at the end of May, and were 2 1/2 games up by the end of June. After moving back into first place on June 9, they did not relinquish the lead the rest of the season. San Diego played at a steady pace, never falling below .500, while their longest winning streak was only six. For much of the final two months, they led the division by eight to ten games. San Diego clinched the division on September 20, when they beat San Francisco 5–4 behind a three-run homer by pitcher Tim Lollar, and Houston lost to Los Angeles 6–2 three hours later. The Padres finished the season with a 92–70 record, winning the NL West division by 12 games. It was just the second winning season in the franchise's history. The future Hall-of-Famer Gwynn batted .351 to capture the first of his eight NL batting titles, while also gathering 213 hits to shatter the Padres record of 194 established by Gene Richards in 1980. Eric Show (15–9, 3.40 ERA) was the only starting pitcher with 15 wins, though the four main starters all recorded at least 11. The acquisition of Gossage, who finished the season 10–6 with a 2.90 ERA and 25 saves, was a strong factor in San Diego's 34–24 record in one-run games.

The team relied on small ball and moving runners from base to base. With the exception of Gwynn, who finished third in balloting for the NL Most Valuable Player Award, no Padre enjoyed an outstanding season individually. McReynolds led the team with a .465 slugging percentage and was tied with Nettles for the team lead in home runs with 20. Only two other Padres exceeded 10 homers. Garvey led the club with 86 RBIs, the only Padre with more than 75. Coming off his thumb injury from 1983, he hit only eight home runs and drew just 24 walks, but had 175 hits and did not commit an error. Wiggins' move to second base proved successful, as he exhibited excellent range with his quickness in spite of his 32 fielding errors. Offensively as the leadoff hitter, he batted .258 and drew 75 walks for an on-base percentage of .342, while setting club records by stealing 70 bases and scoring 106 runs. Benefitting from the higher number of fastballs opposing pitchers threw in response to Wiggins' speed, Gwynn batted above .400 when his speedy teammate was on base. According to Williams, Wiggins "was absolutely the most valuable player in the National League in 1984." No longer a .300 hitter like in his earlier days with St. Louis, Templeton enjoyed his most successful season since 1981. Hitting eighth in the lineup, he did not receive many pitches to hit. He batted .258 with 24 extra-base hits and six game-winning RBI, and was praised by Williams for his defense. Both Templeton and Gwynn were honored by The Sporting News with Silver Slugger Awards, and Martinez (.249, 13 HR, 68 walks) was named to the Topps All-Star Rookie Team. Martinez however, hit only three homers in the second half, and just one after July 18, after hitting 10 in the first half. Troubled by his knees, Kennedy slumped to .240 while his RBIs fell to 57 from 98 a year earlier. Nettles hit .222, which was 29 points below his career average, and most of his homers came in two hot streaks. However, his averages of .252/.355/.469 against right-handed pitching were near his career norms.

San Diego's pitching staff was last in the league in strikeouts per nine innings, and were among the team leaders in most home runs allowed and walks allowed. Still, they were adept at forcing fly balls and had a low ground ball/fly ball ratio. In addition to Show, the starting rotation included fellow 28-year-old Mark Thurmond (14–8, 2.97), as well as veterans Ed Whitson (14–8, 3.24) and Lollar (11–13, 3.91). Andy Hawkins (8–9, 4.68) and Dave Dravecky (9–8, 2.93) split time as the fifth starter. In the bullpen, Gossage and Craig Lefferts (2.13 ERA and 10 saves) each appeared in 62 games and logged over 100 innings apiece. Unlike modern closers, Gossage often entered games in the seventh or eighth innings, with Lefferts filling in as the stopper when Gossage needed a game off after working successive long stints. Dravecky also recorded eight saves. At age 33, Gossage experienced a decline in his fastball, and did not record a save after August 25.

Williams led the team with a tough, no-nonsense approach. He cited the advantage of having the experience of veterans Garvey, Nettles, and Gossage on the team. Prior to joining the Padres, Garvey and Nettles had advanced to the World Series four times, while Gossage had participated in two. Throughout the season, they stressed the value of consistency and an even temperament to youngsters like Gwynn, McReynolds, and Martinez, who were among the 11 players on the team with less than four years of major league experience. Gossage and Nettles, in particular, would stay after games and talk baseball and have a beer with the youngsters. Additionally, Templeton befriended Wiggins, helping his transition from the outfield to second base.

=== Brawl with the Atlanta Braves ===
The Padres' regular season is most remembered for an August 12 Sunday afternoon game at Atlanta–Fulton County Stadium against the Atlanta Braves. From the start, the game was tense and erupted into a series of brawls which ended with a total of 13 ejections and 5 arrests. All fans who participated in the taunting and brawls were detained and arrested. The Braves eventually won the game by a score of 5–3.

Fines and suspensions were issued four days later on August 16 to Williams ($10,000, ten days) and Summers, Brown, Torre ($1,000), Perry ($700), Bedrosian ($600) and Mahler ($700) who each received three-day suspensions. Virgil, Krol, Whitson, Booker, Lefferts, Bevacqua, Flannery, Nettles and Gossage for the Padres (all undisclosed) and Moore ($350) and Pérez ($300) for the Braves were all fined but not suspended.

=== Opening Day starters ===
- Steve Garvey
- Tony Gwynn
- Terry Kennedy
- Carmelo Martínez
- Kevin McReynolds
- Graig Nettles
- Eric Show
- Garry Templeton
- Alan Wiggins

=== Season standings ===
NL West
Team	W	L	Pct.	GB	Home	Road
San Diego Padres	92	70	.568	—	48‍–‍33	44‍–‍37
Atlanta Braves	80	82	.494	12	38‍–‍43	42‍–‍39
Houston Astros	80	82	.494	12	43‍–‍38	37‍–‍44
Los Angeles Dodgers	79	83	.488	13	40‍–‍41	39‍–‍42
Cincinnati Reds	70	92	.432	22	39‍–‍42	31‍–‍50
San Francisco Giants	66	96	.407	26	35‍–‍46	31‍–‍50

=== Record vs. opponents ===
1984 National League record Sources:
Team	ATL	CHC	CIN	HOU	LAD	MON	NYM	PHI	PIT	SD	SF	STL
Atlanta	—	3–9	13–5	12–6	6–12	5–7	4–8	7–5	8–4	7–11	10–8	5–7
Chicago	9–3	—	7–5	6–6	7–5	10–7	12–6	9–9	8–10	6–6	9–3	13–5
Cincinnati	5–13	5–7	—	8–10	7–11	7–5	3–9	5–7	7–5	7–11	12–6	4–8
Houston	6–12	6–6	10–8	—	9–9	7–5	4–8	6–6	6–6	6–12	12–6	8–4
Los Angeles	12–6	5–7	7–11	9–9	—	6–6	3–9	3–9	4–8	10–8	10–8	6–6
Montreal	7–5	7–10	5–7	5–7	6–6	—	7–11	11–7	7–11	7–5	7–5	9–9
New York	8–4	6–12	9–3	8–4	9–3	11–7	—	10–8	12–6	6–6	4–8	7–11
Philadelphia	5-7	9–9	7–5	6–6	9–3	7–11	8–10	—	7–11	7–5	8–4	8–10
Pittsburgh	4–8	10–8	5–7	6–6	8–4	11–7	6–12	11–7	—	4–8	6–6	4–14
San Diego	11–7	6–6	11–7	12–6	8–10	5–7	6–6	5–7	8–4	—	13–5	7–5
San Francisco	8–10	3–9	6–12	6–12	8–10	5–7	8–4	4–8	6–6	5–13	—	7–5
St. Louis	7–5	5–13	8–4	4–8	6–6	9–9	11–7	10–8	14–4	5–7	5–7	—

=== Notable transactions ===
- July 20, 1984: Al Newman was traded by the San Diego Padres to the Montreal Expos for Greg Harris.

=== Roster ===
1984 San Diego Padres
**Roster**
**Pitchers**: 51 Greg Booker; 25 Floyd Chiffer; 35 Luis DeLeón; 43 Dave Dravecky; 54 Goose Gossage; 42 Greg Harris; 40 Andy Hawkins; 37 Craig Lefferts; 48 Tim Lollar; 42 Sid Monge; 30 Eric Show; 38 Mark Thurmond; 31 Ed Whitson	**Catchers**: 15 Bruce Bochy; 10 Doug Gwosdz; 16 Terry Kennedy; **Infielders**: 7 Kurt Bevacqua; 11 Tim Flannery; 6 Steve Garvey; 9 Graig Nettles; 12 Mario Ramírez; 4 Luis Salazar; 24 Champ Summers; 1 Garry Templeton; 2 Alan Wiggins	**Outfielders**: 20 Bobby Brown; 19 Tony Gwynn; 14 Carmelo Martínez; 18 Kevin McReynolds; 39 Eddie Miller; 41 Ron Roenicke	**Manager**: 23 Dick Williams; **Coaches**: 33 Harry Dunlop; 34 Jack Krol; 46 Norm Sherry; 32 Ozzie Virgil

=== Game log ===
1984 regular season game log: 92–70 (Home: 48–33; Away: 44–37)
April: 15–8 (Home: 13–5; Away: 2–3)

#	Date	Opponent	Score	Win	Loss	Save	Attendance	Record	Box Streak
1	April 3	Pirates	5–1	**Show** (1–0)	Rhoden (0–1)		44,553	1-0	W1
2	April 5	Pirates	8–6	**DeLeón** (1–0)	Scurry (0–1)	**Gossage** (1)	19,361	2-0	W2
3	April 6	Cubs	3–2 (wo)	**Monge** (1–0)	Smith (0–1)		15,834	3-0	W3
4	April 7	Cubs	7–6	**Dravecky** (1–0)	Trout (0–1)	**Gossage** (2)	27,799	4-0	W4
5	April 8	Cubs	5–8	Smith (1-1)	**Thurmond** (0–1)		24,285	4-1	L1
6	April 10	Cardinals	7–3	**Hawkins** (1–0)	Forsch (0–1)	**Dravecky** (1)	15,115	5-1	W1
7	April 11	Cardinals	7–5	**Lollar** (1–0)	Andújar (1-1)		15,835	6-1	W2
8	April 12	Braves	6–1	**Whitson** (1–0)	Falcone (0–2)	**Dravecky** (2)	12,419	7-1	W3
9	April 13	Braves	5–2	**Show** (2–0)	Barker (1–2)	**Gossage** (3)	22,614	8-1	W4
10	April 14	Braves	1–5	Camp (1–0)	**Thurmond** (0–2)	Dedmon (1)	46,322	8-2	L1
11	April 15	Braves	6–4	**Monge** (2–0)	McMurtry (1–2)	**Gossage** (4)	27,973	9-2	W1
12	April 17	@ Giants	2–1	**Lollar** (2–0)	Davis (0–3)	**Gossage** (5)	13,998	10-2	W2
13	April 19	@ Dodgers	0–4	Peña (2–1)	**Whitson** (1-1)		46,595	10-3	L1
14	April 20	@ Dodgers	2–8	Valenzuela (1–2)	**Show** (2–1)		50,916	10-4	L2
15	April 21	@ Dodgers	9–6	**Thurmond** (1–2)	Reuss (1-1)	**Gossage** (6)	43,784	11-4	W1
16	April 22	@ Dodgers	7–15	Honeycutt (3–0)	**Lollar** (2–1)		47,938	11-5	L1
17	April 23	Giants	8–2	**Hawkins** (2–0)	Robinson (2-2)		25,569	12-5	W1
18	April 24	Giants	6–1	**Whitson** (2–1)	Krukow (1–3)		12,341	13-5	W2
19	April 25	Giants	3–0	**Show** (3–1)	Laskey (0–2)	**Gossage** (7)	13,059	14-5	W3
20	April 26	Dodgers	5–6	Diaz (1–0)	**Dravecky** (1-1)	Niedenfuer (4)	39,609	14-6	L1
21	April 27	Dodgers	0–1 (7)	Honeycutt (4–0)	**Lollar** (2-2)		34,222	14-7	L2
22	April 28	Dodgers	5–1	**Hawkins** (3–0)	Welch (2–3)		42,576	15-7	W1
23	April 29	Dodgers	0–6	Peña (4–1)	**Whitson** (2-2)		36,147	15-8	L1

May: 10–13 (Home: 3–7; Away: 7–6)

#	Date	Opponent	Score	Win	Loss	Save	Attendance	Record	Box Streak
24	May 1	@ Braves	3–2	**Show** (4–1)	McMurtry (2–3)	**Gossage** (8)	10,748	16-8	W1
25	May 3	@ Braves	5–6	Bedrosian (2–1)	**Gossage** (0–1)	Forster (2)	8,072	16-9	L1
26	May 4	@ Cubs	6–7 (wo)	Smith (2-2)	**Monge** (2–1)		6,533	16-10	L2
27	May 5	@ Cubs	5–6 (10/wo)	Brusstar (1–0)	**Lefferts** (0–1)		28,441	16-11	L3
28	May 6	@ Cubs	8–5	**Show** (5–1)	Ruthven (2–3)		31,700	17-11	W1
29	May 9	@ Cardinals	3–2	**Thurmond** (2-2)	Stuper (0–2)	**Gossage** (9)	14,734	18-11	W2
30	May 10	@ Cardinals	0–7	Andújar (5–3)	**Lollar** (2–3)		20,926	18-12	L1
31	May 11	Phillies	4–6	Holland (1–2)	**Dravecky** (1–2)		18,009	18-13	L2
32	May 12	Phillies	2–3	Campbell (3–0)	**Hawkins** (3–1)	Holland (6)	36,916	18-14	L3
33	May 13	Phillies	3–8	Denny (3-3)	**Whitson** (2–3)		38,645	18-15	L4
34	May 14	Expos	6–7 (10)	Reardon (1-1)	**Dravecky** (1–3)		9,389	18-16	L5
35	May 15	Expos	4–6	Smith (5–2)	**Lollar** (2–4)	Schatzeder (1)	11,025	18-17	L6
36	May 16	Expos	2–3	Lea (6–2)	**Show** (5–2)	Reardon (6)	11,462	18-18	L7
37	May 17	Expos	5–4	**Gossage** (1-1)	McGaffigan (2-2)	**Lefferts** (1)	17,066	19-18	W1
38	May 18	Mets	5–4	**Whitson** (3-3)	Gooden (3-3)	**Gossage** (10)	17,319	20-18	W2
39	May 19	Mets	8–3	**Thurmond** (3–2)	Lynch (4–1)	**Dravecky** (3)	20,017	21-18	W3
40	May 20	Mets	2–4 (10)	Orosco (4–1)	**Lefferts** (0–2)		20,263	21-19	L1
41	May 22	@ Expos	2–3	Lea (7–2)	**Show** (5–3)		19,847	21-20	L2
42	May 23	@ Expos	2–1 (11)	**Dravecky** (2–3)	McGaffigan (3-3)		8,573	22-20	W1
43	May 25	@ Phillies	7–3	**Whitson** (4–3)	Hudson (5–3)		25,964	23-20	W2
44	May 26	@ Phillies	2–7	Bystrom (2–1)	**Thurmond** (3-3)		32,898	23-21	L1
45	May 27	@ Phillies	4–0	**Lollar** (3–4)	Koosman (4–6)	**Lefferts** (2)	34,352	24-21	W1
46	May 28	@ Mets	5–4	**Show** (6–3)	Gaff (0–1)	**Gossage** (11)	36,204	25-21	W2

June: 19–10 (Home: 10–6; Away: 9–4)

#	Date	Opponent	Score	Win	Loss	Save	Attendance	Record	Box Streak
47	Jun 1	@ Giants	7–11	Williams (2–0)	**Hawkins** (3–2)	Minton (2)	10,087	25-22	L1
48	Jun 2	@ Giants	3–2	**Gossage** (2–1)	Garrelts (1-1)		12,662	26-22	W1
49	Jun 3 (1)	@ Giants	7–5	**Lollar** (4-4)	Cornell (0–1)	**Dravecky** (4)		27-22	W2
50	Jun 3 (2)	@ Giants	7–6	**Show** (7–3)	Lavelle (2-2)	**Gossage** (12)	22,863	28-22	W3
51	Jun 4	Astros	3–0	**Whitson** (5–3)	Scott (2–4)	**Dravecky** (5)	9,922	29-22	W4
52	Jun 5	Astros	3–0	**Hawkins** (4–2)	Ruhle (0–4)		11,799	30-22	W5
53	Jun 6	Astros	4–3 (10/wo)	**Gossage** (3–1)	Smith (0–2)		11,087	31-22	W6
54	Jun 7	Reds	1–12	Berenyi (3–6)	**Show** (7–4)	Cato (1)	15,507	31-23	L1
55	Jun 8	Reds	6–0	**Lollar** (5–4)	Price (2–4)		14,002	32-23	W1
56	Jun 9	Reds	12–2	**Whitson** (6–3)	Russell (2–7)	**Lefferts** (3)	48,805	33-23	W2
57	Jun 10	Reds	7–5	**Chiffer** (1–0)	Hume (3–6)	**Dravecky** (6)	18,723	34-23	W3
58	Jun 11	Braves	5–4 (wo)	**Dravecky** (3-3)	Bedrosian (4–3)		9,271	35-23	W4
59	Jun 12	Braves	7–6 (12/wo)	**Lefferts** (1–2)	Bedrosian (4-4)		19,920	36-23	W5
60	Jun 14	Giants	2–5	Davis (3–6)	**Lollar** (5-5)	Lavelle (7)	17,310	36-24	L1
61	Jun 15	Giants	3–2	**Whitson** (7–3)	Robinson (3–7)	**Gossage** (13)	20,353	37-24	W1
62	Jun 16	Giants	3–6	Laskey (3–6)	**Hawkins** (4–3)	Minton (4)	48,375	37-25	L1
63	Jun 17	Giants	3–5 (15)	Williams (4–0)	**Lefferts** (1–3)		24,183	37-26	L2
64	Jun 19	@ Astros	2–0	**Show** (8–4)	Knepper (6–7)		12,765	38-26	W1
65	Jun 20	@ Astros	6–2	**Lollar** (6–5)	Madden (2-2)	**Dravecky** (7)	12,543	39-26	W2
66	Jun 21	@ Astros	5–11	Niekro (6–7)	**Whitson** (7–4)	LaCoss (3)	12,934	39-27	L1
67	Jun 22	@ Reds	7–8 (wo)	Franco (3–0)	**Gossage** (3–2)		23,552	39-28	L2
68	Jun 23	@ Reds	5–2	**Thurmond** (4–3)	Puleo (0–1)		22,192	40-28	W1
69	Jun 24	@ Reds	8–3 (13)	**Dravecky** (4–3)	Hume (3–7)		19,183	41-28	W2
70	Jun 25	@ Dodgers	9–4	**Lollar** (7–5)	Zachry (4–2)		36,629	42-28	W3
71	Jun 26	@ Dodgers	5–0	**Whitson** (8–4)	Welch (6–8)		48,287	43-28	W4
72	Jun 27	@ Dodgers	4–5	Valenzuela (8-8)	**Dravecky** (4-4)	Niedenfuer (9)	49,132	43-29	L1
73	Jun 28	Cardinals	7–3	**Thurmond** (5–3)	Dayley (0–5)		14,097	44-29	W1
74	Jun 29	Cardinals	0–5	Horton (4–1)	**Show** (8–5)		45,468	44-30	L1
75	Jun 30	Cardinals	1–4	Andújar (13–6)	**Lollar** (7–6)	Sutter (19)	31,432	44-31	L2

July: 19–11 (Home: 12–5; Away: 7–6)

#	Date	Opponent	Score	Win	Loss	Save	Attendance	Record	Box Streak
76	Jul 1	Cardinals	3–1	**Whitson** (9–4)	LaPoint (6–8)	**Gossage** (14)	17,664	45-31	W1
77	Jul 2	Cubs	5–1	**Dravecky** (5–4)	Reuschel (4-4)		13,444	46-31	W2
78	Jul 3	Cubs	2–3	Trout (9–3)	**Thurmond** (5–4)	Stoddard (5)	20,287	46-32	L1
79	Jul 4	Cubs	1–2	Sutcliffe (7–6)	**Show** (8–6)	Smith (16)	52,134	46-33	L2
80	Jul 5	Pirates	2–1 (wo)	**Gossage** (4–2)	Scurry (1–5)		14,907	47-33	W1
81	Jul 6	Pirates	7–3	**Whitson** (10–4)	Rhoden (6–7)		18,368	48-33	W2
82	Jul 7	Pirates	1–0	**Dravecky** (6–4)	McWilliams (4–8)	**Gossage** (15)	28,995	49-33	W3
83	Jul 8	Pirates	3–4	Candelaria (7–6)	**Thurmond** (5-5)	Tekulve (7)	17,950	49-34	L1
84	Jul 12	@ Cardinals	4–1	**Show** (9–6)	Andújar (13–7)	**Lefferts** (4)	27,419	50-34	W1
85	Jul 13	@ Cardinals	4–7 (10/wo)	Allen (5–3)	**DeLeón** (1-1)		29,954	50-35	L1
86	Jul 14	@ Cardinals	6–7	LaPoint (7–8)	**Lollar** (7-7)	Sutter (22)	41,260	50-36	L2
87	Jul 15	@ Cardinals	6–1	**Dravecky** (7–4)	Kepshire (1-1)		33,205	51-36	W1
88	Jul 16	@ Cubs	4–0	**Thurmond** (6–5)	Ruthven (2–6)		23,642	52-36	W2
89	Jul 17	@ Cubs	6–5	**Show** (10–6)	Trout (9–4)	**Gossage** (16)	29,499	53-36	W3
90	Jul 18	@ Cubs	1–4	Sutcliffe (10–6)	**Whitson** (10–5)		27,471	53-37	L1
91	Jul 19	@ Pirates	1–5	Candelaria (9–6)	**Lollar** (7–8)		10,048	53-38	L2
92	Jul 20 (1)	@ Pirates	3–4	Rhoden (8–7)	**Dravecky** (7–5)	Robinson (5)		53-39	L3
93	Jul 20 (2)	@ Pirates	3–2	**Hawkins** (5–3)	Tudor (5–8)	**Gossage** (17)	18,007	54-39	W1
94	Jul 21	@ Pirates	6–4	**Thurmond** (7–5)	Walk (1-1)	**Gossage** (18)	11,593	55-39	W2
95	Jul 22 (1)	@ Pirates	5–1	**Whitson** (11–5)	DeLeón (6-6)			56-39	W3
96	Jul 22 (2)	@ Pirates	2–3 (11/wo)	Winn (1–0)	**Gossage** (4–3)		22,971	56-40	L1
97	Jul 24	Reds	2–4	Soto (11–3)	**Lollar** (7–9)		18,381	56-41	L2
98	Jul 25	Reds	6–5 (wo)	**Gossage** (5–3)	Owchinko (3–5)		16,248	57-41	W1
99	Jul 26	Reds	8–2	**Thurmond** (8–5)	Russell (4–12)		20,924	58-41	W2
100	Jul 27	Astros	7–3	**Whitson** (12–5)	Ruhle (1–8)	**Lefferts** (5)	28,868	59-41	W3
101	Jul 28 (1)	Astros	1–3	Niekro (11–8)	**Hawkins** (5–4)			59-42	L1
102	Jul 28 (2)	Astros	1–0	**Show** (11–6)	Ryan (8–7)	**Gossage** (19)	34,730	60-42	W1
103	Jul 29	Astros	9–0	**Lollar** (8–9)	LaCoss (5–2)		23,084	61-42	W2
104	Jul 30	Dodgers	12–0	**Dravecky** (8–5)	Valenzuela (9–12)		40,568	62-42	W3
105	Jul 31	Dodgers	1–0	**Thurmond** (9–5)	Honeycutt (8–6)	**Gossage** (20)	35,704	63-42	W4

August: 15–14 (Home: 5–4; Away: 10–10)

#	Date	Opponent	Score	Win	Loss	Save	Attendance	Record	Box Streak
106	Aug 1	Dodgers	4–3	**Lefferts** (2–3)	Peña (11–6)	**Gossage** (21)	39,076	64-42	W5
107	Aug 3	@ Astros	2–6	Ryan (9–7)	**Show** (11–7)		16,456	64-43	L1
108	Aug 4	@ Astros	5–2	**Lollar** (9-9)	LaCoss (5–3)	**Lefferts** (6)	19,482	65-43	W1
109	Aug 5	@ Astros	9–5	**Hawkins** (6–4)	Niekro (11–9)		11,637	66-43	W2
110	Aug 6	@ Reds	1–0	**Gossage** (6–3)	Price (5–8)		10,798	67-43	W3
111	Aug 7	@ Reds	7–8 (wo)	Power (7–5)	**Harris** (0–2)		11,767	67-44	L1
112	Aug 8	@ Reds	2–4 (wo)	Soto (12–5)	**Gossage** (6–4)		11,222	67-45	L2
113	Aug 9	@ Reds	0–8	Russell (5–12)	**Lollar** (9–10)		10,881	67-46	L3
114	Aug 10 (1)	@ Braves	1–3	Bedrosian (8–6)	**Dravecky** (8–6)	Moore (14)		67-47	L4
115	Aug 10 (2)	@ Braves	10–4	**Hawkins** (7–4)	Falcone (5–7)	**Gossage** (22)	41,287	68-47	W1
116	Aug 11	@ Braves	4–1	**Thurmond** (10–5)	Mahler (8–7)	**Lefferts** (7)	45,099	69-47	W2
117	Aug 12	@ Braves	3–5	Pérez (11–4)	**Whitson** (12–6)		23,912	69-48	L1
118	Aug 14	Phillies	3–2	**Show** (12–7)	Koosman (12–10)	**Lefferts** (8)	23,799	70-48	W1
119	Aug 15	Phillies	4–3 (wo)	**Gossage** (7–4)	Holland (5–7)		21,078	71-48	W2
120	Aug 16	Phillies	3–8	Denny (5–3)	**Hawkins** (7–5)		23,125	71-49	L1
121	Aug 17	Expos	4–8	Rogers (4–12)	**Thurmond** (10–6)	Reardon (17)	17,136	71-50	L2
122	Aug 19	Expos	0–3	Hesketh (1–0)	**Whitson** (12–7)	Reardon (18)	21,697	71-51	L3
123	Aug 20	Mets	3–1	**Show** (13–7)	Fernandez (4–2)	**Gossage** (23)	50,869	72-51	W1
124	Aug 21	Mets	7–4	**Lollar** (10-10)	Lynch (8-8)	**Gossage** (24)	20,998	73-51	W2
125	Aug 22	Mets	2–5	Gooden (12–8)	**Hawkins** (7–6)		25,250	73-52	L1
126	Aug 24 (1)	@ Expos	1–4	Rogers (5–12)	**Thurmond** (10–7)	Reardon (19)	x	73-53	L2
127	Aug 24 (2)	@ Expos	5–4	**Gossage** (8–4)	Reardon (5-5)	**Harris** (3)	34,626	74-53	W1
128	Aug 25	@ Expos	4–3 (13)	**Harris** (1–2)	Reardon (5–6)	**Gossage** (25)	29,665	75-53	W2
129	Aug 26	@ Expos	2–1	**Show** (14–7)	Schatzeder (6–5)		31,778	76-53	W3
130	Aug 27	@ Phillies	1–9	Koosman (14–10)	**Lollar** (10–11)		26,302	76-54	L1
131	Aug 28	@ Phillies	8–11	Rawley (9–6)	**Hawkins** (7-7)	Holland (28)	25,679	76-55	L2
132	Aug 29	@ Phillies	2–0	**Thurmond** (11–7)	Denny (6–5)	**Lefferts** (9)	25,131	77-55	W1
133	Aug 31 (1)	@ Mets	5–1	**Whitson** (13–7)	Fernandez (4–3)			78-55	W2
134	Aug 31 (2)	@ Mets	0–4	Berenyi (10–13)	**Dravecky** (8–7)		38,323	78-56	L1

September: 14–14 (Home: 5–6; Away: 9–8)

#	Date	Opponent	Score	Win	Loss	Save	Attendance	Record	Box Streak
135	Sep 1 (1)	@ Mets	4–7	Gooden (14–8)	**Hawkins** (7–8)	Orosco (28)		78-57	L2
136	Sep 1 (2)	@ Mets	6–10	Gorman (4–0)	**Show** (14–8)	Orosco (29)	35,688	78-58	L3
137	Sep 2	@ Mets	2–3 (12/wo)	Gaff (3–2)	**Gossage** (8–5)		36,915	78-59	L4
138	Sep 3	@ Dodgers	4–3	**Thurmond** (12–7)	Reuss (2–7)	**Lefferts** (10)	43,176	79-59	W1
139	Sep 4	@ Dodgers	1–2 (wo)	Howell (3–4)	**Hawkins** (7–9)		31,988	79-60	L1
140	Sep 5	Reds	15–11	**Lefferts** (3-3)	Hume (4–13)		17,759	80-60	W1
141	Sep 6	Reds	3–10	Price (7–11)	**Show** (14–9)	Owchinko (2)	11,986	80-61	L1
142	Sep 7	Astros	4–6	Niekro (14–10)	**Lollar** (10–12)	DiPino (13)	23,713	80-62	L2
143	Sep 9	Astros	8–4	**Thurmond** (13–7)	LaCoss (7–4)		14,153	81-62	W1
144	Sep 11	Dodgers	2–5	Valenzuela (12–15)	**Whitson** (13–8)		24,505	81-63	L1
145	Sep 12	Dodgers	1–8	Hooton (3–4)	**Dravecky** (8-8)		28,560	81-64	L2
146	Sep 14	@ Astros	4–2	**Gossage** (9–5)	DiPino (4–9)		13,119	82-64	W1
147	Sep 15	@ Astros	2–3	Dawley (9–4)	**Lefferts** (3–4)		15,456	82-65	L1
148	Sep 16	@ Astros	9–10	Smith (4–3)	**Gossage** (9–6)		10,397	82-66	L2
149	Sep 17	@ Reds	3–2 (11)	**Gossage** (10–6)	Power (8–6)		7,728	83-66	W1
150	Sep 18	@ Reds	2–0	**Dravecky** (9–8)	Price (7–12)		10,414	84-66	W2
151	Sep 19	Giants	5–4 (10/wo)	**Hawkins** (8–9)	Garrelts (1–3)		32,964	85-66	W3
152	Sep 20	Giants	5–4	**Lollar** (11–12)	Krukow (10–12)	**Dravecky** (8)	15,766	86-66	W4
153	Sep 21	Braves	1–3	Mahler (12–9)	**Thurmond** (13–8)		46,137	86-67	L1
154	Sep 22	Braves	2–5	Pérez (13–7)	**DeLeón** (1–2)	Garber (10)	47,217	86-68	L2
155	Sep 23	Braves	2–1 (11/wo)	**Booker** (1–0)	Moore (4–5)		40,910	87-68	W1
156	Sep 24 (1)	@ Giants	7–1	**Harris** (2-2)	Robinson (7–15)			88-68	W2
157	Sep 24 (2)	@ Giants	8–6 (11)	**DeLeón** (2-2)	Lacey (1–3)		3,296	89-68	W3
158	Sep 25	@ Giants	3–4	Krukow (11–12)	**Lollar** (11–13)	Minton (19)	4,199	89-69	L1
159	Sep 26	@ Giants	4–0	**Show** (15–9)	Laskey (9–14)		5,634	90-69	W1
160	Sep 28	@ Braves	4–2	**Thurmond** (14–8)	Murtry (9–17)		15,733	91-69	W2
161	Sep 29	@ Braves	6–2	**Whitson** (14–8)	Mahler (13–10)		30,131	92-69	W3
162	Sep 30	@ Braves	3–4	Pérez (14–7)	**Booker** (1-1)	Garber (11)	13,489	92-70	L1

Legend: = Win = Loss = Postponement
Bold = Padres team member

=== Postseason game log ===
1984 postseason game log: 4–6 (Home: 4–1; Away: 0–5)
National League Championship Series: 3–2 (Home: 3–0; Away: 0–2)

#	Date	Opponent	Score	Win	Loss	Save	Attendance	Series
1	Oct 2	@ Cubs	0–13	Sutcliffe (1–0)	**Show** (0–1)		36,282	0–1
2	Oct 3	@ Cubs	2–4	Trout (1–0)	**Thurmond** (0–1)	Smith (1)	36,282	0–2
3	Oct 4	Cubs	7–1	**Whitson** (1–0)	Eckersley (0–1)		58,346	1–2
4	Oct 6	Cubs	7–5 (wo)	**Lefferts** (1–0)	Smith (0–1)		58,354	2-2
5	Oct 7	Cubs	6–3	**Lefferts** (2–0)	Sutcliffe (1-1)	**Gossage** (1)	58,359	3–2

World Series: 1–4 (Home: 1–1; Away: 0–3)

#	Date	Opponent	Score	Win	Loss	Save	Attendance	Series
1	Oct 9	Tigers	2–3	Morris (2–0)	**Thurmond** (0–2)		57,908	0–1
2	Oct 10	Tigers	5–3	**Hawkins** (1–0)	Petry (0–1)	**Lefferts** (1)	57,911	1-1
3	Oct 12	@ Tigers	2–5	Wilcox (2–0)	**Lollar** (0–1)	Hernández (2)	51,970	1–2
4	Oct 13	@ Tigers	2–4	Morris (2–0)	**Show** (0–2)		52,130	1–3
5	Oct 14	@ Tigers	4–8	López (2–0)	**Hawkins** (1-1)	Hernández (3)	51,901	1–4

Legend: = Win = Loss = Postponement
Bold = Padres team member

== Player stats ==
=== Batting ===
==== Starters by position ====
Note: Pos = Position; G = Games played; AB = At bats; H = Hits; Avg. = Batting average; HR = Home runs; RBI = Runs batted in

Pos	Player	G	AB	H	Avg.	HR	RBI
C	Terry Kennedy	148	530	127	.240	14	57
1B	Steve Garvey	161	617	175	.284	8	86
2B	Alan Wiggins	158	596	154	.258	3	34
3B	Graig Nettles	124	395	90	.228	20	65
SS	Garry Templeton	148	493	127	.258	2	35
LF	Carmelo Martínez	149	488	122	.250	13	66
CF	Kevin McReynolds	147	525	146	.278	20	75
RF	Tony Gwynn	158	606	213	.351	5	71

==== Other batters ====
Note: G = Games played; AB = At bats; H = Hits; Avg. = Batting average; HR = Home runs; RBI = Runs batted in

Player	G	AB	H	Avg.	HR	RBI
Luis Salazar	93	228	55	.241	3	17
Bobby Brown	85	171	43	.251	3	29
Tim Flannery	86	128	35	.273	2	10
Bruce Bochy	37	92	21	.228	4	15
Kurt Bevacqua	59	80	16	.200	1	9
Mario Ramírez	48	59	7	.119	2	9
Champ Summers	47	54	10	.185	1	12
Ron Roenicke	12	20	6	.300	1	2
Eddie Miller	13	14	4	.286	1	2
Doug Gwosdz	7	8	2	.250	0	1

=== Pitching ===
==== Starting pitchers ====
Note: G = Games pitched; IP = Innings pitched; W = Wins; L = Losses; ERA = Earned run average; SO = Strikeouts

Player	G	IP	W	L	ERA	SO
Eric Show	32	207.0	15	9	3.40	104
Tim Lollar	31	195.2	11	13	3.91	131
Ed Whitson	31	189.0	14	8	3.24	103
Mark Thurmond	32	178.2	14	8	2.97	57

==== Other pitchers ====
Note: G = Games pitched; IP = Innings pitched; W = Wins; L = Losses; ERA = Earned run average; SO = Strikeouts

Player	G	IP	W	L	ERA	SO
Dave Dravecky	50	156.2	9	8	2.93	71
Andy Hawkins	36	146.0	8	9	4.68	77

==== Relief pitchers ====
Note: G = Games pitched; W = Wins; L = Losses; SV = Saves; ERA = Earned run average; SO = Strikeouts

Player	G	W	L	SV	ERA	SO
Goose Gossage	62	10	6	25	2.90	84
Craig Lefferts	62	3	4	10	2.13	56
Greg Booker	32	1	1	0	3.30	28
Luis DeLeón	32	2	2	0	5.48	44
Greg Harris	19	2	1	1	2.70	30
Floyd Chiffer	15	1	0	0	7.71	20
Sid Monge	13	2	1	0	4.80	7

== NLCS ==
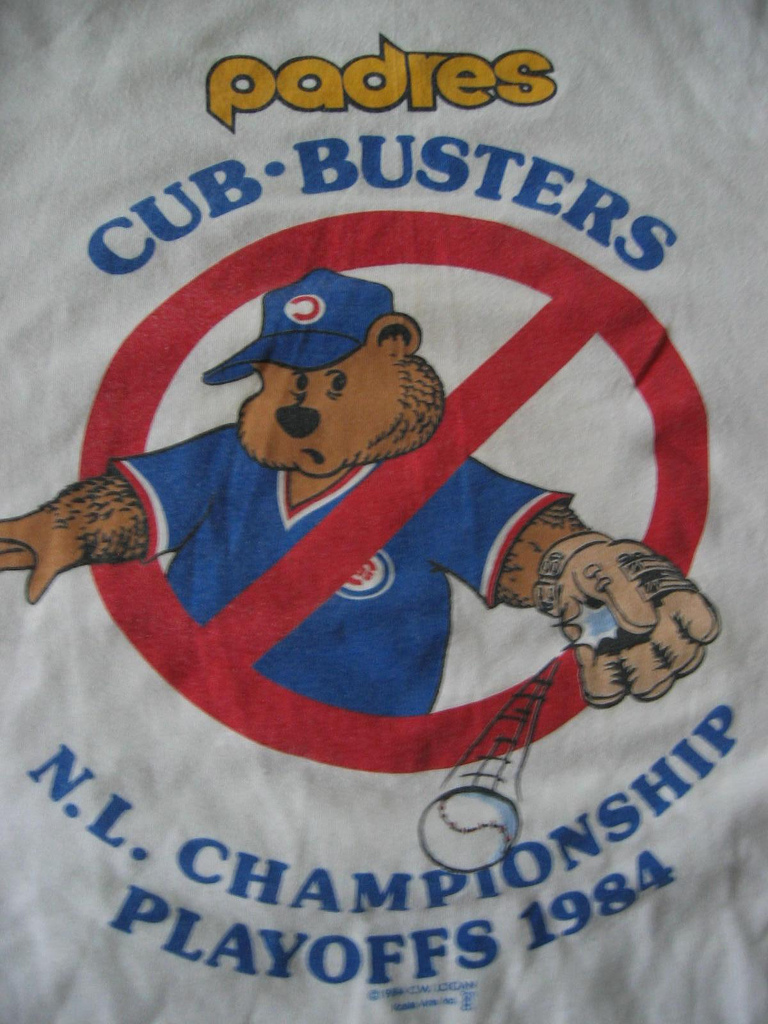
Cub-Busters T-shirts were popular with Padres fans.

In the 1984 NLCS, the Padres faced the NL East champion Chicago Cubs, who were making their first post-season appearance since 1945 and featured NL Most Valuable Player Ryne Sandberg and Cy Young Award winner Rick Sutcliffe. The Cubs would win the first two games at Wrigley Field, but the Padres swept the final three games at then-Jack Murphy Stadium (the highlight arguably being Steve Garvey's dramatic, game-winning home run off of Lee Smith in Game 4) to win the 1984 National League pennant. They became the first National League team to win a playoff series after being down 2–0. Garvey finished the series batting .400 with seven RBIs, and was named the NLCS Most Valuable Player for the second time in his career.

After returning from Chicago on a delayed flight, the team boarded buses from the airport, and was boosted by the surprising 2,000 fans waiting to greet them at the Jack Murphy Stadium parking lot at about 9:45 P.M. Goose Gossage, a former New York Yankee, said the San Diego crowd at Game 3 was "the loudest crowd I've ever heard anywhere." Gwynn agreed as well. Jack Murphy Stadium played "Cub-Busters", a parody of the theme song from the 1984 movie Ghostbusters. Cub-Busters T-shirts inspired from the movie were popular attire for Padres fans. They featured a cartoon of a bear cub with a glove on while dropping a ball. The cub is inside a red circle with a red line going across.

San Diego won the series, 3–2.

Game	Date	Score	Location	Time	Attendance
1	October 2	San Diego Padres – 0, Chicago Cubs – 13	Wrigley Field	2:49	36,282
2	October 3	San Diego Padres – 2, Chicago Cubs – 4	Wrigley Field	2:18	36,282
3	October 4	Chicago Cubs – 1, San Diego Padres – 7	Jack Murphy Stadium	2:19	58,346
4	October 6	Chicago Cubs – 5, San Diego Padres – 7	Jack Murphy Stadium	3:13	58,354
5	October 7	Chicago Cubs – 3, San Diego Padres – 6	Jack Murphy Stadium	2:41	58,359

== World Series ==
In the 1984 World Series, the Padres faced the powerful Detroit Tigers, who steamrolled through the regular season with 104 victories (and had started out with a 35–5 record, the best ever through the first 40 games). The Tigers were managed by Sparky Anderson and featured shortstop and native San Diegan Alan Trammell and outfielder Kirk Gibson, along with Lance Parrish and DH Darrell Evans. The pitching staff was bolstered by ace Jack Morris (19–11, 3.60 ERA), Dan Petry (18–8), Milt Wilcox (17–8), and closer Willie Hernández (9–3, 1.92 ERA with 32 saves). Jack Morris would win games 1 and 4 and the Tigers would go on to win the Series in five games.

San Diego's starting pitchers crumbled in the postseason with a combined ERA of 9.09, including 13.94 against Detroit, surpassing the Cubs mark of 9.50 in 1932 as the worst in the then-82-year history of the World Series. Show, Thurmond, Lollar, and Whitson combined to throw only 10 2/3 innings versus the Tigers while surrendering 25 hits, eight walks, and 16 earned runs. Only once did a starter pitch at least five innings. Whitson (NLCS Game 3) was the only starter to earn a win in the playoffs. Out of the bullpen, Lefferts was excellent in the postseason with 10 scoreless innings in six appearances, while Hawkins and Dravecky pitched well in the playoffs as well.

After a disappointing season for 37-year-old journeyman Kurt Bevacqua, he hit .412 in the World Series as the Padres designated hitter, hitting the game-winning home run in Game 2 as well as an eighth-inning homer in the finale, which had cut San Diego's deficit to 5–4. Playing in place of the injured McReynolds, Bobby Brown had the team's only two RBIs by Padres outfielders against the Tigers, but he batted just 1-for-15.

Reporter Barry Bloom of MLB.com wrote in 2011 that "the postseason in '84 is still the most exciting week of Major League Baseball ever played in San Diego." Gossage, who is mostly remembered as a Yankee, called it "special being a part of turning on a city for the first time, going to the World Series for the first time".

AL Detroit Tigers (4) vs. NL San Diego Padres (1)

Game	Date	Score	Location	Time	Attendance
1	October 9	Detroit Tigers – 3, San Diego Padres – 2	Jack Murphy Stadium	3:18	57,908
2	October 10	Detroit Tigers – 3, San Diego Padres – 5	Jack Murphy Stadium	2:44	57,911
3	October 12	San Diego Padres – 2, Detroit Tigers – 5	Tiger Stadium	3:11	51,970
4	October 13	San Diego Padres – 2, Detroit Tigers – 4	Tiger Stadium	2:20	52,130
5	October 14	San Diego Padres – 4, Detroit Tigers – 8	Tiger Stadium	2:55	51,901

== Award winners ==
- Tony Gwynn, National League Batting Champion (.351)
- Tony Gwynn, National League Leader in Hits (213)

1984 Major League Baseball All-Star Game

- Steve Garvey, first baseman (starter) – 9th selection
- Tony Gwynn, left field (starter) – 1st selection
- Goose Gossage, pitcher (reserve) – 8th selection

== Farm system ==
Level	Team	League	Manager
AAA	Las Vegas Stars	Pacific Coast League	Bob Cluck
AA	Beaumont Golden Gators	Texas League	Bobby Tolan
A	Reno Padres	California League	Jim Skaalen
A	Miami Marlins	Florida State League	Steve Smith
A-Short Season	Spokane Indians	Northwest League	Jack Maloof
