= 1984 San Francisco Giants season =

1984 San Francisco Giants
- League: National League
- Division: West
- Ballpark: Candlestick Park
- City: San Francisco, California
- Owners: Bob Lurie
- General managers: Tom Haller
- Managers: Frank Robinson, Danny Ozark
- Television: KTVU (Hank Greenwald, Gary Park)
- Radio: KNBR (Hank Greenwald, David Glass); SP Radio (Tito Fuentes, Armando Provedor)

The 1984 San Francisco Giants season was the Giants' 102nd season in Major League Baseball, their 27th season in San Francisco since their move from New York following the 1957 season, and their 25th at Candlestick Park. The team finished in sixth place in the National League West with a 66–96 record, 26 games behind the San Diego Padres.

== Offseason ==
- December 5, 1983: Fran Mullins was drafted by the Giants from the Cincinnati Reds in the 1983 rule 5 draft.
- December 6, 1983: Champ Summers was traded by the Giants to the San Diego Padres for Joe Pittman and a player to be named later. The Padres completed the deal by sending Tommy Francis (minors) to the Giants on December 7.
- December 20, 1983: Manny Trillo was signed as a free agent by the Giants.
- January 17, 1984: Mackey Sasser was drafted by the Giants in the 5th round of the 1984 Major League Baseball draft.
- February 8, 1984: Pat Larkin was traded by the Giants to the Detroit Tigers for Colin Ward.
- February 27, 1984: Max Venable, Fred Breining and a player to be named later were traded by the Giants to the Montreal Expos for Al Oliver. The Giants completed the deal by sending Andy McGaffigan to the Expos on March 31.
- March 28, 1984: Gene Richards was signed as a free agent by the Giants.

== Regular season ==
=== Season standings ===
NL West
Team	W	L	Pct.	GB	Home	Road
San Diego Padres	92	70	.568	—	48‍–‍33	44‍–‍37
Atlanta Braves	80	82	.494	12	38‍–‍43	42‍–‍39
Houston Astros	80	82	.494	12	43‍–‍38	37‍–‍44
Los Angeles Dodgers	79	83	.488	13	40‍–‍41	39‍–‍42
Cincinnati Reds	70	92	.432	22	39‍–‍42	31‍–‍50
San Francisco Giants	66	96	.407	26	35‍–‍46	31‍–‍50

=== Record vs. opponents ===
1984 National League record Sources:
Team	ATL	CHC	CIN	HOU	LAD	MON	NYM	PHI	PIT	SD	SF	STL
Atlanta	—	3–9	13–5	12–6	6–12	5–7	4–8	7–5	8–4	7–11	10–8	5–7
Chicago	9–3	—	7–5	6–6	7–5	10–7	12–6	9–9	8–10	6–6	9–3	13–5
Cincinnati	5–13	5–7	—	8–10	7–11	7–5	3–9	5–7	7–5	7–11	12–6	4–8
Houston	6–12	6–6	10–8	—	9–9	7–5	4–8	6–6	6–6	6–12	12–6	8–4
Los Angeles	12–6	5–7	7–11	9–9	—	6–6	3–9	3–9	4–8	10–8	10–8	6–6
Montreal	7–5	7–10	5–7	5–7	6–6	—	7–11	11–7	7–11	7–5	7–5	9–9
New York	8–4	6–12	9–3	8–4	9–3	11–7	—	10–8	12–6	6–6	4–8	7–11
Philadelphia	5-7	9–9	7–5	6–6	9–3	7–11	8–10	—	7–11	7–5	8–4	8–10
Pittsburgh	4–8	10–8	5–7	6–6	8–4	11–7	6–12	11–7	—	4–8	6–6	4–14
San Diego	11–7	6–6	11–7	12–6	8–10	5–7	6–6	5–7	8–4	—	13–5	7–5
San Francisco	8–10	3–9	6–12	6–12	8–10	5–7	8–4	4–8	6–6	5–13	—	7–5
St. Louis	7–5	5–13	8–4	4–8	6–6	9–9	11–7	10–8	14–4	5–7	5–7	—

=== Opening Day starters ===
- Bob Brenly
- Jack Clark
- Chili Davis
- Mark Davis
- Johnnie LeMaster
- Jeffrey Leonard
- Al Oliver
- Manny Trillo
- Joel Youngblood

=== Notable transactions ===
- June 4, 1984: 1984 Major League Baseball draft
  - Terry Mulholland was drafted by the Giants in the 1st round (24th pick).
  - Mike Blowers was drafted by the Giants in the 2nd round of the Secondary Phase, but did not sign.
- August 20, 1984: Al Oliver and a player to be named later were traded by the Giants to the Philadelphia Phillies for Kelly Downs and George Riley. The Giants completed the deal by sending Renie Martin to the Phillies on August 30.

=== Roster ===
1984 San Francisco Giants
Roster
Pitchers: 31 Mark Calvert; 31,45 Jeff Cornell; 13 Mark Davis; 50 Scott Garrelts; 34 Mark Grant; 14 Atlee Hammaker; 39 Mike Krukow; 17 Bob Lacey; 19 Bill Laskey; 46 Gary Lavelle; 29 Randy Lerch; 17 Renie Martin; 38 Greg Minton; 28,51 George Riley; 49 Jeff Robinson; 47 Frank Williams	Catchers: 15 Bob Brenly; 37 Randy Gomez; 7 Steve Nicosia; Infielders: 35 Chris Brown; 18 Duane Kuiper; 10 Johnnie LeMaster; 16 Fran Mullins; 35 Tom O'Malley; 0 Al Oliver; 2 Joe Pittman; 5 John Rabb; 41 Scot Thompson; 9 Manny Trillo; 36 Brad Wellman; 8 Joel Youngblood	Outfielders: 12 Dusty Baker; 22 Jack Clark; 30 Chili Davis; 45 Rob Deer; 32 Dan Gladden; 26 Jeffrey Leonard; 25 Gene Richards; 32 Alejandro Sánchez	Manager: 1 Danny Ozark; 20 Frank Robinson; Coaches: 6 Don Buford (First base); 36 Tommy McCraw (Hitting); 1 Danny Ozark (Third base); 23 Herm Starrette (Pitching); 42 John VanOrnum (Bullpen)

== Game log ==
=== Regular season ===
1984 regular season game log: 66–96 (Home: 35–46; Away: 31–50)
April: 7–16 (Home: 6–6; Away: 1–10)

#	Date	Time (PT)	Opponent	Score	Win	Loss	Save	Time of Game	Attendance	Record	Box/ Streak
1	April 3		Cubs	3–5						0–1	L1
2	April 5		Cubs	7–11						0–2	L2
11	April 17		Padres	1–2						4–7	L1
—	April 18		Padres	**Postponed (Rain)** (Makeup date: September 24)							
16	April 23		@ Padres	2–8						7–9	L1
17	April 24		@ Padres	1–6						7–10	L2
18	April 25		@ Padres	0–3						7–11	L3

May: 9–13 (Home: 4–6; Away: 5–7)

#	Date	Time (PT)	Opponent	Score	Win	Loss	Save	Time of Game	Attendance	Record	Box/ Streak
29	May 7		@ Cubs	7–10						11–18	L1
30	May 8		@ Cubs	11–12						11–19	L2

June: 14–16 (Home: 7–10; Away: 7–6)

#	Date	Time (PT)	Opponent	Score	Win	Loss	Save	Time of Game	Attendance	Record	Box/ Streak
46	June 1		Padres	11–7						17–29	W1
47	June 2		Padres	2–3 (10)						17–30	L1
48	June 3		Padres	5–7						17–31	L2
49	June 3		Padres	6–7						17–32	L3
60	June 14		@ Padres	5–2						22–38	W2
61	June 15		@ Padres	2–3						22–39	L1
62	June 16		@ Padres	6–3						23–39	W1
63	June 17		@ Padres	5–3 (15)						24–39	W2

July: 10–17 (Home: 4–6; Away: 5–7)

#	Date	Time (PT)	Opponent	Score	Win	Loss	Save	Time of Game	Attendance	Record	Box/ Streak
80	July 5		Cubs	3–9						32–48	L3
81	July 6		Cubs	4–5						32–49	L4
82	July 7		Cubs	7–2						33–49	W1
83	July 8		Cubs	3–6						33–50	L1
**55th All-Star Game in San Francisco, CA**
92	July 19		@ Cubs	4–6						35–57	L2
93	July 20		@ Cubs	3–2						36–57	W1
94	July 21		@ Cubs	3–4 (11)						36–58	L1
95	July 22		@ Cubs	11–5						37–58	W1

August: 16–16 (Home: 4–9; Away: 12–7)

#	Date	Time (PT)	Opponent	Score	Win	Loss	Save	Time of Game	Attendance	Record	Box/ Streak

September: 10–18 (Home: 8–6; Away: 2–12)

#	Date	Time (PT)	Opponent	Score	Win	Loss	Save	Time of Game	Attendance	Record	Box/ Streak
151	September 19		@ Padres	4–5 (10)						62–89	L5
152	September 20		@ Padres	4–5						62–90	L6
156	September 24		Padres	1–7						65–91	L1
157	September 24		Padres	6–8 (11)						65–92	L2
158	September 25		Padres	4–3						66–92	W1
159	September 26		Padres	0–4						66–93	L1

Legend: = Win = Loss = Postponement
Bold = Giants team member

== Player stats ==
=== Batting ===
==== Starters by position ====
Note: Pos = Position; G = Games played; AB = At bats; H = Hits; Avg. = Batting average; HR = Home runs; RBI = Runs batted in

Pos	Player	G	AB	H	Avg.	HR	RBI
C	Bob Brenly	145	506	147	.291	20	80
1B	Al Oliver	91	339	101	.298	0	34
2B	Manny Trillo	98	401	102	.254	4	36
SS	Johnny LeMaster	132	451	98	.217	4	32
3B	Joel Youngblood	134	469	119	.254	10	51
LF	Jeffrey Leonard	136	514	155	.302	21	86
CF	Dan Gladden	86	342	120	.351	4	31
RF	Jack Clark	57	203	65	.320	11	44

==== Other batters ====
Note: G = Games played; AB = At bats; H = Hits; Avg. = Batting average; HR = Home runs; RBI = Runs batted in

Player	G	AB	H	Avg.	HR	RBI
Chili Davis	137	499	157	.315	21	81
Brad Wellman	93	265	60	.226	2	25
Scot Thompson	120	245	75	.306	1	31
Dusty Baker	100	243	71	.292	3	32
Gene Richards	87	135	34	.252	0	4
Steve Nicosia	48	132	40	.303	2	19
Duane Kuiper	83	115	23	.200	0	11
Fran Mullins	57	110	24	.218	2	10
Chris Brown	23	84	24	.286	1	11
John Rabb	54	82	16	.195	3	9
Alejandro Sánchez	13	41	8	.195	0	2
Randy Gomez	14	30	5	.167	0	0
Tom O'Malley	13	25	3	.120	0	0
Rob Deer	13	24	4	.167	3	3
Joe Pittman	17	22	5	.227	0	2

=== Pitching ===
==== Starting pitchers ====
Note: G = Games pitched; IP = Innings pitched; W = Wins; L = Losses; ERA = Earned run average; SO = Strikeouts

Player	G	IP	W	L	ERA	SO
Bill Laskey	35	207.2	9	14	4.33	71
Mike Krukow	35	199.1	11	12	4.56	141
Jeff Robinson	34	171.2	7	15	4.56	102
Mark Grant	11	53.2	1	4	6.37	32
Atlee Hammaker	6	33.0	2	0	2.18	24
George Riley	5	29.1	1	0	3.99	12

==== Other pitchers ====
Note: G = Games pitched; IP = Innings pitched; W = Wins; L = Losses; ERA = Earned run average; SO = Strikeouts

Player	G	IP	W	L	ERA	SO
Mark Davis	46	174.2	5	17	5.36	124
Mark Calvert	10	32.0	2	4	5.06	5

==== Relief pitchers ====
Note: G = Games pitched; W = Wins; L = Losses; SV = Saves; ERA = Earned run average; SO = Strikeouts

Player	G	W	L	SV	ERA	SO
Greg Minton	74	4	9	19	3.76	48
Gary Lavelle	77	5	4	12	2.76	71
Frank Williams	61	9	4	3	3.55	91
Randy Lerch	37	5	3	2	4.23	48
Bob Lacey	34	1	3	0	3.88	26
Jeff Cornell	23	1	3	0	6.10	19
Scott Garrelts	21	2	3	0	5.65	32
Renie Martin	12	1	1	0	3.86	8

== Awards and honors ==
- Bob Brenly, Willie Mac Award

All-Star Game

- Bob Brenly, Catcher, Reserve
- Chili Davis, Outfield, Reserve

== Farm system ==
Level	Team	League	Manager
AAA	Phoenix Giants	Pacific Coast League	Jack Mull
AA	Shreveport Captains	Texas League	Duane Espy
A	Fresno Giants	California League	Wendell Kim
A	Clinton Giants	Midwest League	Bill Lachemann
A-Short Season	Everett Giants	Northwest League	Rocky Bridges
