= 1984 St. Louis Cardinals season =

Major League Baseball season

1984 St. Louis Cardinals
- League: National League
- Division: East
- Ballpark: Busch Memorial Stadium
- City: St. Louis, Missouri
- Record: 84–78 (.519)
- Divisional place: 3rd
- Owners: August "Gussie" Busch
- General managers: Joe McDonald
- Managers: Whitey Herzog
- Television: KSDK (Jack Buck, Mike Shannon, Jay Randolph); Sports Time (Jack Buck, Mike Shannon, Bob Carpenter)
- Radio: KMOX (Jack Buck, Mike Shannon, Dan Kelly, Red Rush)

The 1984 St. Louis Cardinals season was the Cardinals' 103rd season in St. Louis, Missouri and the 93rd season in the National League. The Cardinals went 84–78 during the season and finished third in the National League East, 12½ games behind their arch-rivals, the Chicago Cubs. It was also the final season of the Columbia blue road uniforms for the Cardinals.

== Offseason ==
- January 17, 1984: Rafael Santana was released by the Cardinals.
- March 26, 1984: Jamie Quirk was released by the Cardinals.

== Regular season ==
Pitcher Joaquín Andújar and shortstop Ozzie Smith won Gold Gloves this year. Bruce Sutter had a then-NL record of 45 saves.

- June 23, 1984: What turned out to be a key game for the Cubs occurred at Wrigley, with the Cubs facing the rival Cardinals on the nationally televised "Game of the Week". The Cardinals led throughout the game, and led 9-8 going into the bottom of the ninth with closer Bruce Sutter on the mound. Second baseman Ryne Sandberg led off the ninth with a solo home run into the left-field bleachers, tying the game at nine. The following inning, St. Louis regained the lead, and Sutter stayed in the game attempting to close out the win. After the first two batters were retired, Bob Dernier walked, bringing up Sandberg again. He promptly hit another game-tying home run into the left-field bleachers, sending the Wrigley fans into a frenzy. The Cardinals did not score in the top of the 11th, but the Cubs loaded the bases on three walks, then rookie Dave Owen singled in the winning run. Willie McGee hit for the cycle and had 6 RBI but Ryne Sandberg had 7 RBI in the game. Henceforth, this game has become known as "The Sandberg Game".

=== Season standings ===
NL East
Team	W	L	Pct.	GB	Home	Road
Chicago Cubs	96	65	.596	—	51‍–‍29	45‍–‍36
New York Mets	90	72	.556	6½	48‍–‍33	42‍–‍39
St. Louis Cardinals	84	78	.519	12½	44‍–‍37	40‍–‍41
Philadelphia Phillies	81	81	.500	15½	39‍–‍42	42‍–‍39
Montreal Expos	78	83	.484	18	39‍–‍42	39‍–‍41
Pittsburgh Pirates	75	87	.463	21½	41‍–‍40	34‍–‍47

=== Record vs. opponents ===
1984 National League record Sources:
Team	ATL	CHC	CIN	HOU	LAD	MON	NYM	PHI	PIT	SD	SF	STL
Atlanta	—	3–9	13–5	12–6	6–12	5–7	4–8	7–5	8–4	7–11	10–8	5–7
Chicago	9–3	—	7–5	6–6	7–5	10–7	12–6	9–9	8–10	6–6	9–3	13–5
Cincinnati	5–13	5–7	—	8–10	7–11	7–5	3–9	5–7	7–5	7–11	12–6	4–8
Houston	6–12	6–6	10–8	—	9–9	7–5	4–8	6–6	6–6	6–12	12–6	8–4
Los Angeles	12–6	5–7	7–11	9–9	—	6–6	3–9	3–9	4–8	10–8	10–8	6–6
Montreal	7–5	7–10	5–7	5–7	6–6	—	7–11	11–7	7–11	7–5	7–5	9–9
New York	8–4	6–12	9–3	8–4	9–3	11–7	—	10–8	12–6	6–6	4–8	7–11
Philadelphia	5-7	9–9	7–5	6–6	9–3	7–11	8–10	—	7–11	7–5	8–4	8–10
Pittsburgh	4–8	10–8	5–7	6–6	8–4	11–7	6–12	11–7	—	4–8	6–6	4–14
San Diego	11–7	6–6	11–7	12–6	8–10	5–7	6–6	5–7	8–4	—	13–5	7–5
San Francisco	8–10	3–9	6–12	6–12	8–10	5–7	8–4	4–8	6–6	5–13	—	7–5
St. Louis	7–5	5–13	8–4	4–8	6–6	9–9	11–7	10–8	14–4	5–7	5–7	—

=== Notable transactions ===
- April 5, 1984: Gary Rajsich was purchased by the Cardinals from the New York Mets.
- May 10, 1984: Dane Iorg was purchased from the Cardinals by the Kansas City Royals.
- June 15, 1984: Ken Oberkfell was traded by the Cardinals to the Atlanta Braves for Ken Dayley and Mike Jorgensen.

==== Draft picks ====
- June 4, 1984: 1984 Major League Baseball draft
  - Lance Johnson was drafted by the Cardinals in the 6th round. Player signed June 13, 1984.
  - Craig Wilson was drafted by the Cardinals in the 20th round.

=== Roster ===
1984 St. Louis Cardinals
Roster
Pitchers: 13 Neil Allen; 47 Joaquín Andújar; 43 Ralph Citarella; 34 Danny Cox; 46 Ken Dayley; 31 Bob Forsch; 34 Kevin Hagen; 44 Andy Hassler; 49 Ricky Horton; 50 Kurt Kepshire; 32 Jeff Lahti; 39 Dave LaPoint; 40 Rick Ownbey; 36 Dave Rucker; 48 John Stuper; 42 Bruce Sutter; 38 Dave Von Ohlen	Catchers: 11 Glenn Brummer; 23 Tom Nieto; 15 Darrell Porter; 10 Mark Salas; Infielders: 22 David Green; 28 Tom Herr; 7 Art Howe; 19 Dane Iorg; 19 Mike Jorgensen; 30 Bill Lyons; 10 Ken Oberkfell; 9 Terry Pendleton; 33 Gary Rajsich; 5 Mike Ramsey; 1 Ozzie Smith; 5 Chris Speier; 5 Jose Uribe	Outfielders: 26 Steve Braun; 25 George Hendrick; 37 Paul Householder; 21 Tito Landrum; 51 Willie McGee; 27 Lonnie Smith; 18 Andy Van Slyke	Manager: 24 Whitey Herzog; Coaches: 8 Hal Lanier; 16 Nick Leyva; 3 Dave Ricketts; 4 Mike Roarke; 2 Red Schoendienst

== Player stats ==
= Indicates team leader

= Indicates league leader

=== Batting ===
==== Starters by position ====
Note: Pos = Position; G = Games played; AB = At bats; H = Hits; Avg. = Batting average; HR = Home runs; RBI = Runs batted in

Pos	Player	G	AB	H	Avg.	HR	RBI
C	Darrell Porter	127	422	98	.232	11	68
1B	David Green	126	452	121	.268	15	65
2B	Tom Herr	145	558	154	.276	4	49
SS	Ozzie Smith	124	412	106	.257	1	44
3B	Terry Pendleton	67	262	85	.324	1	33
LF	Lonnie Smith	145	504	126	.250	6	49
CF	Willie McGee	145	571	166	.291	6	50
RF	George Hendrick	120	441	122	.277	9	69

==== Other batters ====
Note: G = Games played; AB = At bats; H = Hits; Avg. = Batting average; HR = Home runs; RBI = Runs batted in

Player	G	AB	H	Avg.	HR	RBI
Andy Van Slyke	137	361	88	.244	7	50
Tito Landrum	105	173	47	.272	3	26
Ken Oberkfell	50	152	47	.309	0	11
Art Howe	89	139	30	.216	2	12
Chris Speier	38	118	21	.178	3	8
Steve Braun	86	98	27	.276	0	16
Mike Jorgensen	59	98	24	.245	1	12
Tom Nieto	33	86	24	.279	3	12
Bill Lyons	46	73	16	.219	0	3
Glenn Brummer	28	58	12	.207	1	3
Dane Iorg	15	28	4	.143	0	3
Mark Salas	14	20	2	.100	0	1
José Uribe	8	19	4	.211	0	3
Mike Ramsey	21	15	1	.067	0	0
Paul Householder	13	14	2	.143	0	0
Gary Rajsich	7	7	1	.143	0	2

=== Pitching ===
==== Starting pitchers ====
Note: G = Games pitched; IP = Innings pitched; W = Wins; L = Losses; ERA = Earned run average; SO = Strikeouts

Player	G	IP	W	L	ERA	SO
Joaquín Andújar	36	261.1	20	14	3.34	147
Dave LaPoint	33	193.0	12	10	3.96	130
Danny Cox	29	156.1	9	11	4.03	70
Kurt Kepshire	17	109.0	6	5	3.30	71
Rick Ownbey	4	19.0	0	3	4.74	11

==== Other pitchers ====
Note: G = Games pitched; IP = Innings pitched; W = Wins; L = Losses; ERA = Earned run average; SO = Strikeouts

Player	G	IP	W	L	ERA	SO
Ricky Horton	37	125.2	9	4	3.44	76
John Stuper	15	61.1	3	5	5.28	19
Bob Forsch	16	52.1	2	5	6.02	21
Ralph Citarella	10	22.1	0	1	3.63	15
Ken Dayley	3	5.0	0	2	18.00	0

==== Relief pitchers ====
Note: G = Games pitched; W = Wins; L = Losses; SV = Saves; ERA = Earned run average; SO = Strikeouts

Player	G	W	L	SV	ERA	SO
Bruce Sutter	71	5	7	45	1.54	77
Jeff Lahti	63	4	2	1	3.72	45
Neil Allen	57	9	6	3	3.55	66
Dave Rucker	50	2	3	0	2.10	38
Dave Von Ohlen	27	1	0	1	3.12	19
Kevin Hagen	4	1	0	0	2.45	2
Andy Hassler	3	1	0	0	11.57	1

== Awards and honors ==
=== League top ten finishers ===
- Joaquín Andújar, National League Leader, Wins (20)
- Joaquín Andújar, National League Leader, Innings Pitched (261.1)
- Joaquín Andújar, National League Leader, Shutouts (4)

== Farm system ==
Level	Team	League	Manager
AAA	Louisville Redbirds	American Association	Jim Fregosi
AA	Arkansas Travelers	Texas League	Dave Bialas
A	St. Petersburg Cardinals	Florida State League	Jim Riggleman
A	Springfield Cardinals	Midwest League	Joe Rigoli
A	Savannah Cardinals	South Atlantic League	Lloyd Merritt
A-Short Season	Erie Cardinals	New York–Penn League	Rich Hacker
Rookie	Johnson City Cardinals	Appalachian League	Chuck Hiller

LEAGUE CHAMPIONS: Louisville
