= 1984 Cincinnati Reds season =

1984 Cincinnati Reds
- League: National League
- Division: West
- Ballpark: Riverfront Stadium
- City: Cincinnati
- Record: 70–92 (.432)
- Divisional place: 5th
- Owners: Marge Schott
- General managers: Bob Howsam, Bill Bergesch
- Managers: Vern Rapp, Pete Rose
- Television: WLWT, Sports Time (Ray Lane, Ken Wilson)
- Radio: WLW (Marty Brennaman, Joe Nuxhall)

The 1984 Cincinnati Reds season was the 115th season for the franchise in Major League Baseball, and their 15th and 14th full season at Riverfront Stadium. The Cincinnati Reds failed to improve on their 74–88 record from the previous season to finish at 70–92, and missed the postseason for the 5th consecutive season. Marge Schott became primary owner during the year. It marked the return of Bob Howsam as General Manager, after Dick Wagner was fired during the 1983 season. The Reds finished in fifth place that year, as they escaped last place in the NL West, which the team had finished in 1982 and 1983.

== Offseason ==
- November 4, 1983: Brad Gulden was signed as a free agent with the Cincinnati Reds.
- November 12, 1983: Bob Owchinko was purchased by the Cincinnati Reds from the Pittsburgh Pirates.
- November 21, 1983: Steve Christmas was traded by the Reds to the Chicago White Sox for Fran Mullins.
- November 21, 1983: Wayne Krenchicki was purchased by the Reds from the Detroit Tigers.
- December 5, 1983: Fran Mullins was drafted from the Reds by the San Francisco Giants in the rule 5 draft.
- December 6, 1983: Tony Pérez was purchased by the Reds from the Philadelphia Phillies.
- December 7, 1983: Dave Parker was signed as a free agent by the Reds.

== Regular season ==
Reds pitcher Mario Soto endured two suspensions during the 1984 season for various incidents. In the first incident, on May 27 against the Chicago Cubs in Wrigley Field, third baseman Ron Cey hit what was originally ruled a home run down the left field line. Believing the ball had gone foul, Soto and Reds manager Vern Rapp disputed the call, and during the argument, Soto shoved third base umpire Steve Rippley, who had made the call.

After conferring, the umpires changed their decision and ruled it a foul ball, drawing a protest from the Cubs. However, for shoving Rippley, Soto was ejected, prompting him to charge the field and attack Cubs coach Don Zimmer, which triggered a ten-minute brawl. Four days later, National League president Chub Feeney suspended Mario Soto for five games. This game is also notable because Soto's opponent that day was future Hall of Fame Dennis Eckersley, who would go on to become a record-setting closer years later. "Eck", who was making his Cubs debut after being acquired in a trade with the Boston Red Sox, took the loss that day.

In the second incident, on June 16, the Reds were playing the Atlanta Braves in Atlanta. Soto threw several brushback pitches at Braves slugger Claudell Washington. Washington tossed his bat in the direction of Soto, appeared to go out to retrieve it, but instead walked toward the mound. Umpire Lanny Harris attempted to restrain Washington. Harris was thrown to the ground. Soto used the distraction to punch Washington. Several of Washington's teammates attempted to hold Washington to the ground. While they were doing that, Soto fired the baseball into the crowd of players, striking Braves coach Joe Pignatano. He was suspended three games for this incident; Washington received a five-game suspension for shoving Lanny Harris.

The Reds drew the two smallest attendances in the history of Riverfront Stadium in 1984. Only 3,921 were on hand to see the Reds play the New York Mets on April 4, which was the record for the smallest crowd until May 31, when they lost to the Braves 7–1 in a makeup game from April, which drew just 2,472. That started a five-game series sweep of the Reds by Atlanta.

Prior to May 31, the Reds were 26-22 and trailed the San Diego Padres by a half-game in the NL West standings. From then until August 16, the Reds went 25-48 and had long left any hopes of winning the division. August 16 was the day the Reds brought Rose back as player-manager, as part of a trade with Montreal, as Rapp was fired.

=== Season standings ===
NL West
| Team | W | L | Pct. | GB | Home | Road |
|---|---|---|---|---|---|---|
| San Diego Padres | 92 | 70 | .568 | — | 48‍–‍33 | 44‍–‍37 |
| Atlanta Braves | 80 | 82 | .494 | 12 | 38‍–‍43 | 42‍–‍39 |
| Houston Astros | 80 | 82 | .494 | 12 | 43‍–‍38 | 37‍–‍44 |
| Los Angeles Dodgers | 79 | 83 | .488 | 13 | 40‍–‍41 | 39‍–‍42 |
| Cincinnati Reds | 70 | 92 | .432 | 22 | 39‍–‍42 | 31‍–‍50 |
| San Francisco Giants | 66 | 96 | .407 | 26 | 35‍–‍46 | 31‍–‍50 |

=== Record vs. opponents ===
1984 National League record Sources:
| Team | ATL | CHC | CIN | HOU | LAD | MON | NYM | PHI | PIT | SD | SF | STL |
|---|---|---|---|---|---|---|---|---|---|---|---|---|
| Atlanta | — | 3–9 | 13–5 | 12–6 | 6–12 | 5–7 | 4–8 | 7–5 | 8–4 | 7–11 | 10–8 | 5–7 |
| Chicago | 9–3 | — | 7–5 | 6–6 | 7–5 | 10–7 | 12–6 | 9–9 | 8–10 | 6–6 | 9–3 | 13–5 |
| Cincinnati | 5–13 | 5–7 | — | 8–10 | 7–11 | 7–5 | 3–9 | 5–7 | 7–5 | 7–11 | 12–6 | 4–8 |
| Houston | 6–12 | 6–6 | 10–8 | — | 9–9 | 7–5 | 4–8 | 6–6 | 6–6 | 6–12 | 12–6 | 8–4 |
| Los Angeles | 12–6 | 5–7 | 7–11 | 9–9 | — | 6–6 | 3–9 | 3–9 | 4–8 | 10–8 | 10–8 | 6–6 |
| Montreal | 7–5 | 7–10 | 5–7 | 5–7 | 6–6 | — | 7–11 | 11–7 | 7–11 | 7–5 | 7–5 | 9–9 |
| New York | 8–4 | 6–12 | 9–3 | 8–4 | 9–3 | 11–7 | — | 10–8 | 12–6 | 6–6 | 4–8 | 7–11 |
| Philadelphia | 5-7 | 9–9 | 7–5 | 6–6 | 9–3 | 7–11 | 8–10 | — | 7–11 | 7–5 | 8–4 | 8–10 |
| Pittsburgh | 4–8 | 10–8 | 5–7 | 6–6 | 8–4 | 11–7 | 6–12 | 11–7 | — | 4–8 | 6–6 | 4–14 |
| San Diego | 11–7 | 6–6 | 11–7 | 12–6 | 8–10 | 5–7 | 6–6 | 5–7 | 8–4 | — | 13–5 | 7–5 |
| San Francisco | 8–10 | 3–9 | 6–12 | 6–12 | 8–10 | 5–7 | 8–4 | 4–8 | 6–6 | 5–13 | — | 7–5 |
| St. Louis | 7–5 | 5–13 | 8–4 | 4–8 | 6–6 | 9–9 | 11–7 | 10–8 | 14–4 | 5–7 | 5–7 | — |

=== Notable transactions ===
- March 30, 1984: Dallas Williams was traded by the Reds to the Detroit Tigers for Charlie Nail (minors).
- August 16, 1984: Tom Lawless was traded by the Reds to the Montreal Expos for Pete Rose. Rose was named player-manager, as Vern Rapp was fired.

=== Roster ===
1984 Cincinnati Reds roster
Roster
| Pitchers: 38 Bruce Berenyi; 54 Tom Browning; 42 Keefe Cato; 31,52 John Franco; 47 Tom Hume; 50 Brad Lesley; 37 Andy McGaffigan; 32 Bob Owchinko; 35 Frank Pastore; 48 Ted Power; 49 Joe Price; 25 Charlie Puleo; 33 Ron Robinson; 46 Jeff Russell; 34 Bill Scherrer; 37 Mike Smith; 36 Mario Soto; 38 Jay Tibbs; 59 Freddie Toliver; 40 Carl Willis | Catchers: 11 Dann Bilardello; 4 Brad Gulden; 29 Alex Treviño; 23 Dave Van Gorder; Infielders: 21 Skeeter Barnes; 13 Dave Concepción; 22 Dan Driessen; 12 Nick Esasky; 10 Tom Foley; 34 Alan Knicely; 15 Wayne Krenchicki; 17 Tom Lawless; 16 Ron Oester; 24 Tony Pérez; 14 Pete Rose; 56 Wade Rowdon | Outfielders: 28 César Cedeño; 44 Eric Davis; 7 Paul Householder; 20 Eddie Milner; 39 Dave Parker; 2 Gary Redus; 26 Duane Walker | Manager: 9 Vern Rapp; 14 Pete Rose; Coaches: 19 Tommy Helms; 6 Bruce Kimm; 3 George Scherger; 8 Joe Sparks; 40 Stan Williams |

== Player stats ==
=== Batting ===
==== Starters by position ====
Note: Pos = Position; G = Games played; AB = At bats; H = Hits; Avg. = Batting average; HR = Home runs; RBI = Runs batted in

| Pos | Player | G | AB | H | Avg. | HR | RBI |
|---|---|---|---|---|---|---|---|
| C | Brad Gulden | 107 | 292 | 66 | .226 | 4 | 33 |
| 1B | Dan Driessen | 81 | 218 | 61 | .280 | 7 | 28 |
| 2B | Ron Oester | 150 | 553 | 134 | .242 | 3 | 38 |
| SS | Dave Concepción | 154 | 531 | 130 | .245 | 4 | 58 |
| 3B | Nick Esasky | 113 | 322 | 62 | .193 | 10 | 45 |
| LF | Gary Redus | 123 | 394 | 100 | .254 | 7 | 22 |
| CF | Eddie Milner | 117 | 336 | 78 | .232 | 7 | 29 |
| RF | Dave Parker | 156 | 607 | 173 | .285 | 16 | 94 |

==== Other batters ====
Note: G = Games played; AB = At bats; H = Hits; Avg. = Batting average; HR = Home runs; RBI = Runs batted in

| Player | G | AB | H | Avg. | HR | RBI |
|---|---|---|---|---|---|---|
| César Cedeño | 110 | 380 | 105 | .276 | 10 | 47 |
| Tom Foley | 106 | 277 | 70 | .253 | 5 | 27 |
| Duane Walker | 83 | 195 | 57 | .292 | 10 | 28 |
| Dann Bilardello | 68 | 182 | 38 | .209 | 2 | 10 |
| Wayne Krenchicki | 97 | 181 | 54 | .298 | 6 | 22 |
| Eric Davis | 57 | 174 | 39 | .224 | 10 | 30 |
| Tony Pérez | 71 | 137 | 33 | .241 | 2 | 15 |
| Dave Van Gorder | 38 | 101 | 23 | .228 | 0 | 6 |
| Pete Rose | 26 | 96 | 35 | .365 | 0 | 11 |
| Tom Lawless | 43 | 80 | 20 | .250 | 1 | 2 |
| Skeeter Barnes | 32 | 42 | 5 | .119 | 1 | 3 |
| Alan Knicely | 10 | 29 | 4 | .138 | 0 | 5 |
| Paul Householder | 14 | 12 | 1 | .083 | 0 | 0 |
| Wade Rowdon | 4 | 7 | 2 | .286 | 0 | 0 |
| Alex Treviño | 6 | 6 | 1 | .167 | 0 | 0 |

=== Pitching ===
==== Starting pitchers ====
Note: G = Games pitched; IP = Innings pitched; W = Wins; L = Losses; ERA = Earned run average; SO = Strikeouts

| Player | G | IP | W | L | ERA | SO |
|---|---|---|---|---|---|---|
| Mario Soto | 33 | 237.1 | 18 | 7 | 3.53 | 185 |
| Jeff Russell | 33 | 181.2 | 6 | 18 | 4.26 | 101 |
| Joe Price | 30 | 171.2 | 7 | 13 | 4.19 | 129 |
| Jay Tibbs | 14 | 100.2 | 6 | 2 | 2.86 | 40 |
| Bruce Berenyi | 13 | 51.0 | 3 | 7 | 6.00 | 53 |
| Tom Browning | 3 | 23.1 | 1 | 0 | 1.54 | 14 |

==== Other pitchers ====
Note: G = Games pitched; IP = Innings pitched; W = Wins; L = Losses; ERA = Earned run average; SO = Strikeouts

| Player | G | IP | W | L | ERA | SO |
|---|---|---|---|---|---|---|
| Tom Hume | 54 | 113.1 | 4 | 13 | 5.64 | 59 |
| Frank Pastore | 24 | 98.1 | 3 | 8 | 6.50 | 53 |
| Ron Robinson | 12 | 39.2 | 1 | 2 | 2.72 | 24 |
| Andy McGaffigan | 9 | 23.0 | 0 | 2 | 5.48 | 18 |
| Charlie Puleo | 5 | 22.0 | 1 | 2 | 5.73 | 6 |
| Freddie Toliver | 3 | 10.0 | 0 | 0 | 0.90 | 4 |

==== Relief pitchers ====
Note: G = Games pitched; W = Wins; L = Losses; SV = Saves; ERA = Earned run average; SO = Strikeouts

| Player | G | W | L | SV | ERA | SO |
|---|---|---|---|---|---|---|
| Ted Power | 78 | 9 | 7 | 11 | 2.82 | 81 |
| John Franco | 54 | 6 | 2 | 4 | 2.61 | 55 |
| Bob Owchinko | 49 | 3 | 5 | 2 | 4.12 | 60 |
| Bill Scherrer | 36 | 1 | 1 | 1 | 4.99 | 35 |
| Brad Lesley | 16 | 0 | 1 | 2 | 5.12 | 7 |
| Keefe Cato | 8 | 0 | 1 | 1 | 8.04 | 12 |
| Mike Smith | 8 | 1 | 0 | 0 | 5.23 | 7 |
| Carl Willis | 7 | 0 | 1 | 1 | 3.72 | 3 |

== Farm system ==
| Level | Team | League | Manager |
|---|---|---|---|
| AAA | Wichita Aeros | American Association | Gene Dusan |
| AA | Vermont Reds | Eastern League | Jack Lind |
| A | Tampa Tarpons | Florida State League | Marc Bombard |
| A | Cedar Rapids Reds | Midwest League | Jim Lett |
| Rookie | GCL Reds | Gulf Coast League | Sam Mejías |
| Rookie | Billings Mustangs | Pioneer League | Larry Barton, Jr. |

LEAGUE CHAMPIONS: Vermont
