= 1984 Montreal Expos season =

1984 Montreal Expos
- League: National League
- Division: East
- Ballpark: Olympic Stadium
- City: Montreal
- Record: 78–83 (.484)
- Divisional place: 5th
- Owners: Charles Bronfman
- General managers: John McHale, Murray Cook
- Managers: Bill Virdon, Jim Fanning
- Television: CBC Television (Dave Van Horne, Duke Snider); Télévision de Radio-Canada (Jean-Pierre Roy, Raymond Lebrun)
- Radio: CFCF (English) (Dave Van Horne, Duke Snider, Tommy Hutton, Ron Reusch); CKAC (French) (Jacques Doucet, Rodger Brulotte)

The 1984 Montreal Expos season was the 16th season in franchise history. They recorded 78 wins during the 1984 season and finished in fifth place in the National League East. A managerial change occurred as Bill Virdon was replaced by Jim Fanning. The highlight of the Expos season was the acquisition of Pete Rose. After being benched in the 1983 World Series, Rose left the Phillies and signed a one-year contract with the Montreal Expos. He garnered his 4,000th hit with the team on April 13, 1984, against the Phillies, being only the second player to do so.

== Offseason ==
- October 7, 1983: Woodie Fryman was released by the Expos.
- October 31, 1983: Tim Barrett was signed as an amateur free agent by the Expos.
- December 7, 1983: Scott Sanderson was traded by the Expos to the Chicago Cubs, and Al Newman was traded by the Expos to the San Diego Padres as part of a 3-team trade. The Padres sent Gary Lucas to the Montreal Expos. The Cubs sent Carmelo Martínez, Craig Lefferts, and Fritzie Connally to the Padres.
- December 7, 1983: Ray Burris was traded by the Expos to the Oakland Athletics for Rusty McNealy and cash.
- December 19, 1983: Dan Schatzeder was signed as a free agent by the Expos.
- December 23, 1983: Sal Butera was signed as a free agent by the Expos.
- January 20, 1984: Pete Rose was signed as a free agent by the Expos.
- February 27, 1984: Al Oliver was traded by the Expos to the San Francisco Giants for Max Venable, Fred Breining, and a player to be named later. The Giants completed the trade by sending Andy McGaffigan to the Expos on March 31.

== Spring training ==
The Expos held spring training at West Palm Beach Municipal Stadium in West Palm Beach, Florida – a facility they shared with the Atlanta Braves. It was their eighth season at the stadium; they had conducted spring training there from 1969 to 1972 and since 1981.

== Regular season ==
- April 13, 1984: Pete Rose doubled off of his former teammate, Phillies pitcher Jerry Koosman, for his 4,000th career hit. Rose would join Ty Cobb as only the second player to enter the 4000 hit club. The hit came 21 years to the day after Rose's first career hit. Rose was eventually traded to the Reds for infielder Tom Lawless on August 15. While with the Expos, Rose had 72 hits and batted .259.

=== Opening Day starters ===
- Gary Carter
- Andre Dawson
- Charlie Lea
- Bryan Little
- Tim Raines
- Bobby Ramos
- Pete Rose
- Ángel Salazar
- Tim Wallach

=== Season standings ===
NL East
Team	W	L	Pct.	GB	Home	Road
Chicago Cubs	96	65	.596	—	51‍–‍29	45‍–‍36
New York Mets	90	72	.556	6½	48‍–‍33	42‍–‍39
St. Louis Cardinals	84	78	.519	12½	44‍–‍37	40‍–‍41
Philadelphia Phillies	81	81	.500	15½	39‍–‍42	42‍–‍39
Montreal Expos	78	83	.484	18	39‍–‍42	39‍–‍41
Pittsburgh Pirates	75	87	.463	21½	41‍–‍40	34‍–‍47

=== Record vs. opponents ===
1984 National League record Sources:
Team	ATL	CHC	CIN	HOU	LAD	MON	NYM	PHI	PIT	SD	SF	STL
Atlanta	—	3–9	13–5	12–6	6–12	5–7	4–8	7–5	8–4	7–11	10–8	5–7
Chicago	9–3	—	7–5	6–6	7–5	10–7	12–6	9–9	8–10	6–6	9–3	13–5
Cincinnati	5–13	5–7	—	8–10	7–11	7–5	3–9	5–7	7–5	7–11	12–6	4–8
Houston	6–12	6–6	10–8	—	9–9	7–5	4–8	6–6	6–6	6–12	12–6	8–4
Los Angeles	12–6	5–7	7–11	9–9	—	6–6	3–9	3–9	4–8	10–8	10–8	6–6
Montreal	7–5	7–10	5–7	5–7	6–6	—	7–11	11–7	7–11	7–5	7–5	9–9
New York	8–4	6–12	9–3	8–4	9–3	11–7	—	10–8	12–6	6–6	4–8	7–11
Philadelphia	5-7	9–9	7–5	6–6	9–3	7–11	8–10	—	7–11	7–5	8–4	8–10
Pittsburgh	4–8	10–8	5–7	6–6	8–4	11–7	6–12	11–7	—	4–8	6–6	4–14
San Diego	11–7	6–6	11–7	12–6	8–10	5–7	6–6	5–7	8–4	—	13–5	7–5
San Francisco	8–10	3–9	6–12	6–12	8–10	5–7	8–4	4–8	6–6	5–13	—	7–5
St. Louis	7–5	5–13	8–4	4–8	6–6	9–9	11–7	10–8	14–4	5–7	5–7	—

=== Notable transactions ===
- June 4, 1984: Anthony Young was drafted by the Expos in the 10th round of the 1984 Major League Baseball draft, but did not sign.
- July 20, 1984: Al Newman was traded by the San Diego Padres to the Montreal Expos for Greg A. Harris.
- August 16, 1984: Pete Rose was traded by the Expos to the Cincinnati Reds for Tom Lawless.

=== Roster ===
1984 Montreal Expos
Roster
Pitchers: 39 Greg Bargar; 48 Fred Breining; 50 Rick Grapenthin; 34 Bill Gullickson; 20 Greg Harris; 38 Joe Hesketh; 42 Bob James; 53 Charlie Lea; 25 Gary Lucas; 37 Andy McGaffigan; 46 David Palmer; 41 Jeff Reardon; 45 Steve Rogers; 43 Dan Schatzeder; 28 Bryn Smith; 51 Randy St. Claire	Catchers: 33 Sal Butera; 8 Gary Carter; 44 Bobby Ramos; Infielders: 24 Dan Driessen; 23 Doug Flynn; 16 Terry Francona; 19 Rene Gonzales; 35 Ron Johnson; 37 Wallace Johnson; 20 Tom Lawless; 3 Bryan Little; 4 Mike Ramsey; 14 Pete Rose; 6 Ángel Salazar; 31 Razor Shines; 4 Chris Speier; 13 Derrel Thomas; 29 Tim Wallach	Outfielders: 10 Andre Dawson; 18 Miguel Diloné; 15 Mike Fuentes; 27 Roy Johnson; 30 Tim Raines; 1 Tony Scott; 32 Mike Stenhouse; 49 Max Venable; 5 Jim Wohlford	Manager: 7 Jim Fanning; 7 Bill Virdon; Coaches: 17 Felipe Alou (First Base); 36 Galen Cisco (Pitching); 2 Billy DeMars (Hitting); 40 Joe Kerrigan (Bullpen); 12 Russ Nixon (Third Base)

== Player stats ==
= Indicates team leader

= Indicates league leader

=== Batting ===
==== Starters by position ====
Note: Pos = Position; G = Games played; AB = At bats; H = Hits; Avg. = Batting average; HR = Home runs; RBI = Runs batted in; SB = Stolen bases

Pos	Player	G	AB	H	Avg.	HR	RBI	SB
C	Gary Carter	159	596	175	.294	27	106	2
1B	Terry Francona	58	214	74	.346	1	18	0
2B	Doug Flynn	124	366	89	.243	0	17	0
SS	Ángel Salazar	80	174	27	.155	0	12	1
3B	Tim Wallach	160	582	143	.246	18	72	3
LF	Jim Wohlford	95	213	64	.300	5	29	3
CF	Tim Raines	160	622	192	.309	8	60	75
RF	Andre Dawson	138	533	132	.248	17	86	13

==== Other batters ====
Note: G = Games played; AB = At bats; H = Hits; Avg. = Batting average; HR = Home runs; RBI = Runs batted in

Player	G	AB	H	Avg.	HR	RBI
Pete Rose	95	278	72	.259	0	23
Bryan Little	85	266	65	.244	0	9
Derrel Thomas	108	243	62	.255	0	20
Mike Stenhouse	80	175	32	.183	4	16
Miguel Dilone	88	169	47	.278	1	10
Dan Driessen	51	169	43	.254	9	32
Bobby Ramos	31	83	16	.193	2	5
Tony Scott	45	71	18	.254	0	5
Max Venable	38	71	17	.239	2	7
Mike Ramsey	37	70	15	.214	0	3
Chris Speier	25	40	6	.150	0	1
Roy Johnson	16	33	5	.152	1	2
Rene Gonzales	29	30	7	.233	0	2
Wallace Johnson	17	24	5	.208	0	4
Razor Shines	12	20	6	.300	0	2
Tom Lawless	11	17	3	.176	0	0
Ron Johnson	5	5	1	.200	0	1
Mike Fuentes	3	4	1	.250	0	0
Sal Butera	3	3	0	.000	0	0

=== Pitching ===
==== Starting pitchers ====
Note: G = Games pitched; IP = Innings pitched; W = Wins; L = Losses; ERA = Earned run average; SO = Strikeouts

Player	G	IP	W	L	ERA	SO
Bill Gullickson	32	226.2	12	9	3.61	100
Charlie Lea	30	224.1	15	10	2.89	123
Bryn Smith	28	179.0	12	13	3.32	101
Steve Rogers	31	169.1	6	15	4.31	64
David Palmer	20	105.1	7	3	3.84	66

==== Other pitchers ====
Note: G = Games pitched; IP = Innings pitched; W = Wins; L = Losses; ERA = Earned run average; SO = Strikeouts

Player	G	IP	W	L	ERA	SO
Dan Schatzeder	36	136.0	7	7	2.71	89
Joe Hesketh	11	45.0	2	2	1.80	32
Greg Bargar	3	8.0	0	1	7.88	2

==== Relief pitchers ====
Note: G = Games pitched; W = Wins; L = Losses; SV = Saves; ERA = Earned run average; SO = Strikeouts

Player	G	W	L	SV	ERA	SO
Jeff Reardon	68	7	7	23	2.90	79
Bob James	62	6	6	10	3.66	91
Gary Lucas	55	0	3	8	2.72	42
Andy McGaffigan	21	3	4	1	2.54	39
Greg A. Harris	15	0	1	2	2.04	15
Rick Grapenthin	13	1	2	2	3.52	9
Randy St. Claire	4	0	0	0	4.50	4
Fred Breining	4	0	0	0	1.35	5

== Award winners ==
- Andre Dawson, Gold Glove Award, Outfield
- Tim Raines, National League Leader, 38 Doubles
- Tim Raines, National League Leader, 75 Stolen Bases

1984 Major League Baseball All-Star Game

- Gary Carter, catcher, starter
- Charlie Lea, pitcher, starter
- Tim Raines, outfield, reserve
- Tim Wallach, third baseman, reserve

== Farm system ==
Level	Team	League	Manager
AAA	Indianapolis Indians	American Association	Buck Rodgers
AA	Jacksonville Suns	Southern League	Rick Renick
A	West Palm Beach Expos	Florida State League	Tommy Thompson
A	Gastonia Expos	South Atlantic League	J. R. Miner
A-Short Season	Jamestown Expos	New York–Penn League	Moby Benedict
Rookie	Calgary Expos	Pioneer League	Ed Creech
