= 1984 New York Mets season =

1984 New York Mets
- League: National League
- Division: East
- Ballpark: Shea Stadium
- City: New York
- Record: 90–72 (.556)
- Divisional place: 2nd
- Owners: Nelson Doubleday, Jr.
- General manager: Frank Cashen
- Manager: Davey Johnson
- Television: WOR-TV/SportsChannel New York (Ralph Kiner, Steve Zabriskie, Tim McCarver, Fran Healy)
- Radio: WHN (Bob Murphy, Steve LaMar, Juan Alicea)

The 1984 New York Mets season was the 23rd regular season for the Mets. They went 90–72 (their first winning season in 8 years) and finished in second place in the National League East, six and half games behind the first place Chicago Cubs. They were managed by Davey Johnson. They played home games at Shea Stadium.

This was Davey Johnson's first season as Mets manager and the move paid instant dividends. With rookie Dwight Gooden and the first full seasons as Mets for Keith Hernandez & Darryl Strawberry the Mets contended for the division title but fell just short against the Cubs. It would be the first of 6 straight seasons where the Mets would finish either first or second in the division.

The Mets would acquire more future championship pieces during the season by drafting Kevin Elster, signing free agent Rafael Santana and trading for Sid Fernandez and most importantly, Ray Knight.

Despite their winning record, the Mets were actually outscored on the season, 676 runs allowed to 652 scored. Their Pythagorean winning percentage, a sabermetric estimate of expected record based on run differential, translated to a 78–84 mark — 12 games worse than their actual 90–72 finish.

== Offseason ==
- December 8, 1983: Acquired Sid Fernandez and Ross Jones from the Los Angeles Dodgers for Bob Bailor and Carlos Diaz.
- January 17, 1984: Kevin Elster was drafted by the Mets in the 2nd round of the 1984 Major League Baseball draft. Player signed May 21, 1984.
- January 17, 1984: Rafael Santana was signed as a free agent by the Mets.
- January 20, 1984: The Chicago White Sox choose Tom Seaver from the Mets as a free agent compensation pick.
- January 27, 1984: Signed Dick Tidrow as a free agent. The Mets released him on May 8.
- January 30, 1984: Released Dave Kingman.
- February 19, 1984: Kelvin Moore was traded by the Mets to the Milwaukee Brewers for Billy Max (minors).
- March 17, 1984: Jerry Martin was signed as a free agent with the New York Mets.

== Regular season ==
1984 got off to an embarrassing start for GM Frank Cashen and the Mets before the season even began. Believing that it was unnecessary to protect a high-salaried, 39-year-old pitcher, the Mets left Tom Seaver unprotected. In a move that stunned the Mets, on January 20 Seaver was claimed in a free-agent compensation draft by the Chicago White Sox.

This left opening day duties to Mike Torrez. Torrez lasted only 1.1 innings against the Cincinnati Reds at Riverfront Stadium, giving up six earned runs, and giving the Mets their first opening day loss since 1974. Davey Johnson's team did, however, come back to win the next six in a row, including Dwight Gooden's Major League Baseball debut on April 7. Johnson also helped bring the Mets back in contention, producing their first winning season since 1976. Off-season acquisition Sid Fernandez made his debut with the Mets on July 16, going seven innings against the Houston Astros at the Astrodome, and earning the victory.

=== Season standings ===
NL East
Team	W	L	Pct.	GB	Home	Road
Chicago Cubs	96	65	.596	—	51‍–‍29	45‍–‍36
New York Mets	90	72	.556	6½	48‍–‍33	42‍–‍39
St. Louis Cardinals	84	78	.519	12½	44‍–‍37	40‍–‍41
Philadelphia Phillies	81	81	.500	15½	39‍–‍42	42‍–‍39
Montreal Expos	78	83	.484	18	39‍–‍42	39‍–‍41
Pittsburgh Pirates	75	87	.463	21½	41‍–‍40	34‍–‍47

=== Record vs. opponents ===
1984 National League record Sources:
Team	ATL	CHC	CIN	HOU	LAD	MON	NYM	PHI	PIT	SD	SF	STL
Atlanta	—	3–9	13–5	12–6	6–12	5–7	4–8	7–5	8–4	7–11	10–8	5–7
Chicago	9–3	—	7–5	6–6	7–5	10–7	12–6	9–9	8–10	6–6	9–3	13–5
Cincinnati	5–13	5–7	—	8–10	7–11	7–5	3–9	5–7	7–5	7–11	12–6	4–8
Houston	6–12	6–6	10–8	—	9–9	7–5	4–8	6–6	6–6	6–12	12–6	8–4
Los Angeles	12–6	5–7	7–11	9–9	—	6–6	3–9	3–9	4–8	10–8	10–8	6–6
Montreal	7–5	7–10	5–7	5–7	6–6	—	7–11	11–7	7–11	7–5	7–5	9–9
New York	8–4	6–12	9–3	8–4	9–3	11–7	—	10–8	12–6	6–6	4–8	7–11
Philadelphia	5-7	9–9	7–5	6–6	9–3	7–11	8–10	—	7–11	7–5	8–4	8–10
Pittsburgh	4–8	10–8	5–7	6–6	8–4	11–7	6–12	11–7	—	4–8	6–6	4–14
San Diego	11–7	6–6	11–7	12–6	8–10	5–7	6–6	5–7	8–4	—	13–5	7–5
San Francisco	8–10	3–9	6–12	6–12	8–10	5–7	8–4	4–8	6–6	5–13	—	7–5
St. Louis	7–5	5–13	8–4	4–8	6–6	9–9	11–7	10–8	14–4	5–7	5–7	—

=== Notable transactions ===
- May 9, 1984: Released Craig Swan.
- June 4, 1984: 1984 Major League Baseball draft
  - Shawn Abner was drafted by the Mets in the 1st round (1st pick).
  - Mauro Gozzo was drafted by the Mets in the 13th round.
- June 15, 1984: Acquired Bruce Berenyi from the Cincinnati Reds for Jay Tibbs, Eddie Williams and Matts Bullinger.
- June 22, 1984: Released Mike Torrez.
- July 10, 1984: Heathcliff Slocumb was signed by the Mets as an amateur free agent.
- August 28, 1984: The Mets traded players to be named later to the Houston Astros for Ray Knight. The Mets completed the deal by sending Gerald Young and Manuel Lee to the Astros on August 31 and Mitch Cook (minors) to the Astros on September 10.
- August 28, 1984: Jeff Gardner was signed as an amateur free agent by the Mets.
- September 30, 1984: Jerry Martin was released by the New York Mets.

=== Opening Day starters ===
- Wally Backman
- Hubie Brooks
- George Foster
- John Gibbons
- Keith Hernandez
- Jose Oquendo
- Darryl Strawberry
- Mike Torrez
- Mookie Wilson

=== Roster ===
1984 New York Mets
Roster
Pitchers: 27 Bruce Berenyi; 44 Ron Darling; 50 Sid Fernandez; 45 Brent Gaff; 27 Wes Gardner; 16 Dwight Gooden; 29 Tom Gorman; 38 Tim Leary; 36 Ed Lynch; 47 Jesse Orosco; 40 Calvin Schiraldi; 39 Doug Sisk; 27 Craig Swan; 49 Walt Terrell; 13 Dick Tidrow; 30 Mike Torrez	Catchers: 20 Mike Fitzgerald; 8 John Gibbons; 42 Ron Hodges; 34 Junior Ortiz; 12 John Stearns; Infielders: 6 Wally Backman; 7 Hubie Brooks; 11 Kelvin Chapman; 19 Ron Gardenhire; 17 Keith Hernandez; 21 Ross Jones; 22 Ray Knight; 32 Kevin Mitchell; 2 José Oquendo; 3 Rafael Santana; 10 Rusty Staub	Outfielders: 35 Billy Beane; 35 John Christensen; 15 George Foster; 25 Danny Heep; 9 Jerry Martin; 18 Darryl Strawberry; 1 Mookie Wilson; 21,3 Herm Winningham	Manager: 5 Davey Johnson; Coaches: 51 Vern Hoscheit; 55 Frank Howard; 26 Bill Robinson; 48 Mel Stottlemyre; 28 Bobby Valentine

== Game log ==
Legend
Mets Win	Mets Loss	Game Postponed
Bold = Mets team member

=== Regular season ===
1984 Game Log
Overall: 90–72 (Home: 48–33; Away: 42–39)
April: 12–8 (Home: 4–2; Away: 8–6)

#	Date	Time (ET)	Opponent	Score	Win	Loss	Save	Time of Game	Attendance	Record	Box/ Streak	GB

May: 10–13 (Home: 6–9; Away: 4–4)

#	Date	Time (ET)	Opponent	Score	Win	Loss	Save	Time of Game	Attendance	Record	Box/ Streak	GB

June: 16–12 (Home: 6–8; Away: 10–5)

#	Date	Time (ET)	Opponent	Score	Win	Loss	Save	Time of Game	Attendance	Record	Box/ Streak	GB

July: 21–9 (Home: 13–4; Away: 8–5)

#	Date	Time (ET)	Opponent	Score	Win	Loss	Save	Time of Game	Attendance	Record	Box/ Streak	GB
–	July 10		**1984 Major League Baseball All-Star Game** at Candlestick Park in San Francisco									

August: 15–17 (Home: 7–6; Away: 8–11)

#	Date	Time (ET)	Opponent	Score	Win	Loss	Save	Time of Game	Attendance	Record	Box/ Streak	GB

September: 16–13 (Home: 12–4; Away: 4–9)

#	Date	Time (ET)	Opponent	Score	Win	Loss	Save	Time of Game	Attendance	Record	Box/ Streak	GB

== Player stats ==
=== Batting ===
==== Starters by position ====
Note: Pos = Position; G = Games played; AB = At bats; H = Hits; Avg. = Batting average; HR = Home runs; RBI = Runs batted in

Pos	Player	G	AB	H	Avg.	HR	RBI
C	Mike Fitzgerald	112	360	87	.242	2	33
1B	Keith Hernandez	154	550	171	.311	15	94
2B	Wally Backman	128	436	122	.280	1	26
SS	Ron Gardenhire	74	207	51	.246	1	10
3B	Hubie Brooks	153	561	159	.283	16	73
LF	George Foster	146	553	149	.269	24	86
CF	Mookie Wilson	154	587	162	.276	10	54
RF	Darryl Strawberry	147	522	131	.251	26	97

==== Other batters ====
Note: G = Games played; AB = At bats; H = Hits; Avg. = Batting average; HR = Home runs; RBI = Runs batted in

Player	G	AB	H	Avg.	HR	RBI
Danny Heep	99	199	46	.231	1	12
Kelvin Chapman	75	197	57	.289	3	23
José Oquendo	81	189	42	.222	0	10
Rafael Santana	51	152	42	.276	1	12
Ron Hodges	64	106	22	.208	1	11
Ray Knight	27	93	26	.280	1	6
Jerry Martin	51	91	14	.154	3	5
Junior Ortiz	40	91	18	.198	0	11
Rusty Staub	78	72	19	.264	1	18
John Gibbons	10	31	2	.065	0	1
Herm Winningham	14	27	11	.407	0	5
John Stearns	8	17	3	.176	0	1
Kevin Mitchell	7	14	3	.214	0	1
John Christensen	5	11	3	.273	0	3
Billy Beane	5	10	1	.100	0	0
Ross Jones	17	10	1	.100	0	1

=== Pitching ===
==== Starting pitchers ====
Note: G = Games pitched; IP = Innings pitched; W = Wins; L = Losses; ERA = Earned run average; SO = Strikeouts

Player	G	IP	W	L	ERA	SO
Dwight Gooden	31	218.0	17	9	2.60	276
Walt Terrell	33	215.0	11	12	3.52	114
Ron Darling	33	205.2	12	9	3.81	136
Bruce Berenyi	19	115.0	9	6	3.76	81
Sid Fernandez	15	90.0	6	6	3.50	62
Mike Torrez	9	37.2	1	5	5.02	16

==== Other pitchers ====
Note: G = Games pitched; IP = Innings pitched; W = Wins; L = Losses; ERA = Earned run average; SO = Strikeouts

Player	G	IP	W	L	ERA	SO
Ed Lynch	40	124.0	9	8	4.50	62
Tim Leary	20	53.2	3	3	4.02	29
Calvin Schiraldi	5	17.1	0	2	5.71	16

==== Relief pitchers ====
Note: G = Games pitched; W = Wins; L = Losses; SV = Saves; ERA = Earned run average; SO = Strikeouts

Player	G	W	L	SV	ERA	SO
Jesse Orosco	60	10	6	31	2.59	85
Doug Sisk	50	1	3	15	2.09	32
Brent Gaff	47	3	2	1	3.63	42
Tom Gorman	36	6	0	0	2.97	40
Wes Gardner	21	1	1	1	6.39	19
Dick Tidrow	11	0	0	0	9.19	8
Craig Swan	10	1	0	0	8.20	10

== Farm system ==
Level	Team	League	Manager
AAA	Tidewater Tides	International League	Bob Schaefer
AA	Jackson Mets	Texas League	Sam Perlozzo
A	Lynchburg Mets	Carolina League	Mike Cubbage
A	Columbia Mets	South Atlantic League	Rich Miller
A-Short Season	Little Falls Mets	New York–Penn League	Bud Harrelson
Rookie	Kingsport Mets	Appalachian League	Dan Radison

LEAGUE CHAMPIONS: Jackson, Lynchburg, Little Falls

== Awards and honors ==
- Mike Fitzgerald, Topps All-Star Rookie Teams
- Dwight Gooden, Rookie of the Year & Topps All-Star Rookie Team
- Keith Hernandez, Gold Glove & Silver Slugger

All-Star Game

- Dwight Gooden, pitcher
- Jesse Orosco, pitcher
- Darryl Strawberry, outfielder
