= Mark Thurmond =

American baseball player (born 1956)

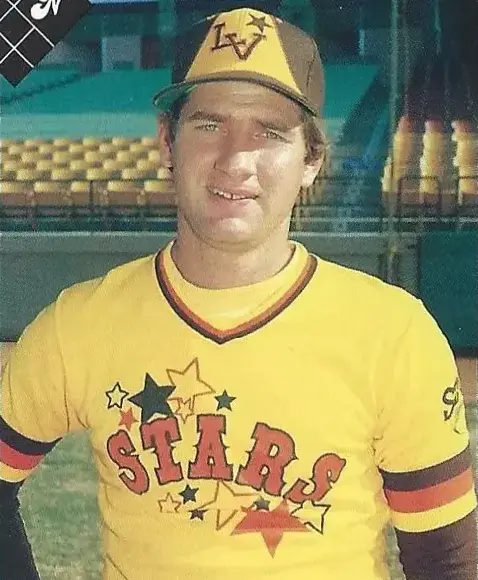
- Thurmond with the Las Vegas Stars c. 1983
- Pitcher
- Born: September 12, 1956 (age 69); Houston, Texas, U.S.
- Batted: Left Threw: Left

MLB debut
- May 14, 1983, for the San Diego Padres

Last MLB appearance
- September 2, 1990, for the San Francisco Giants

MLB statistics
- Win–loss record: 40–46
- Earned run average: 3.69
- Strikeouts: 320
- Stats at Baseball Reference

Teams
- San Diego Padres (1983–1986); Detroit Tigers (1986–1987); Baltimore Orioles (1988–1989); San Francisco Giants (1990)
Medals
Representing United States
Amateur World Series
Silver medal – second place	1978 Italy	Team

Mark Anthony Thurmond (born September 12, 1956) is an American former professional baseball player who pitched in the Major Leagues from 1983 to 1990. He was never on the disabled list in his career.

== Career ==
=== San Diego Padres (1983–1986) ===
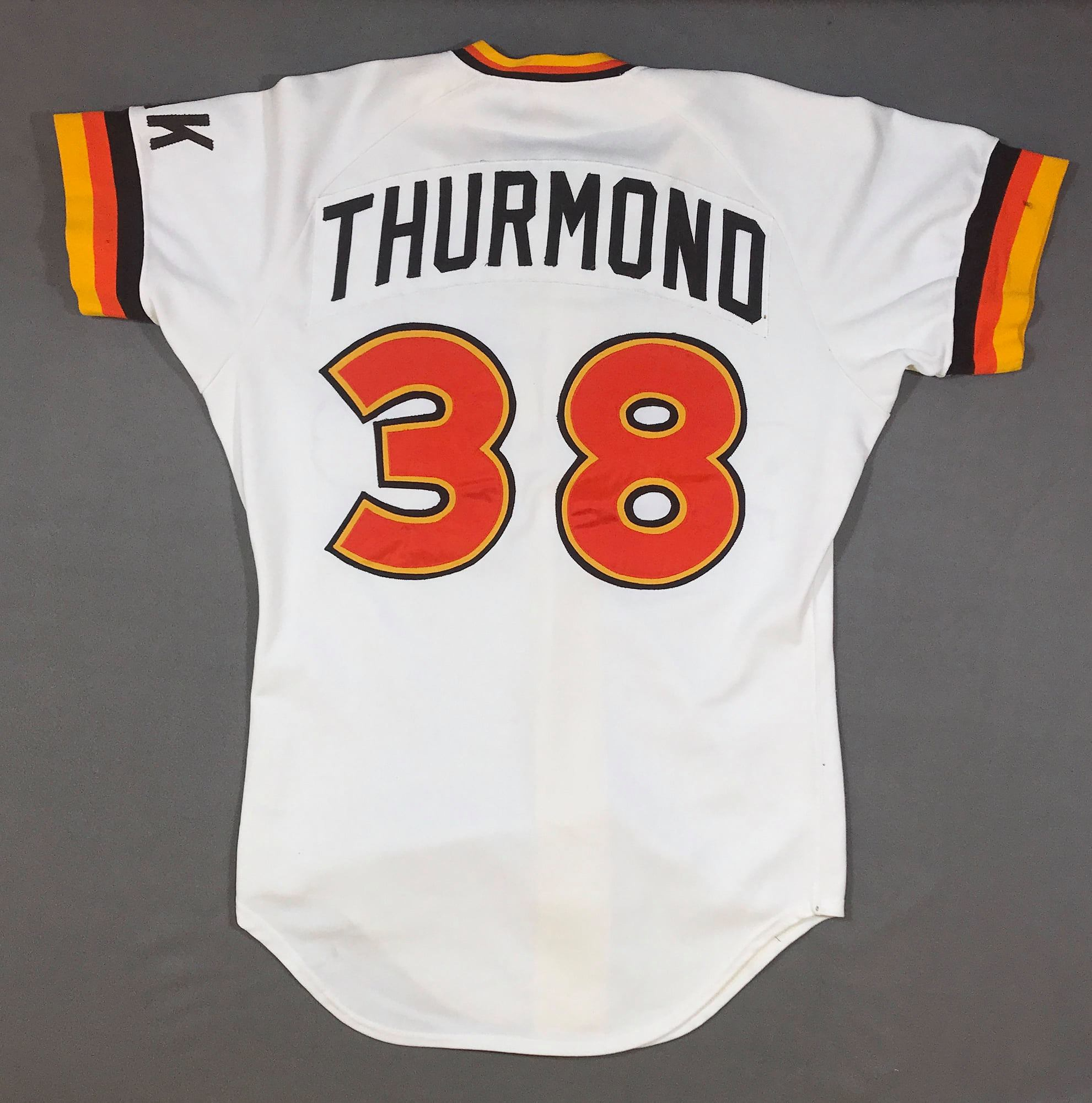
1984 San Diego Padres #38 Mark Thurmond home jersey

Thurmond was drafted by the San Diego Padres out of Texas A&M University in the 24th round of the 1978 MLB draft, but he chose not to sign. He was then drafted by the Padres in the fifth round of the 1979 MLB draft, and he signed that time.

As a rookie in 1983, Thurmond went 7–3 with a 2.65 ERA, and he was tied for ninth in the 1983 NL Rookie of the Year Award voting. In 1984 he recorded a 14–8 with a 2.97 ERA record as the Padres won the National League West.

He lost Game 2 of the National League Championship Series, giving up 4 runs in 3 2/3 innings, but it didn't matter in the end as the Padres overcame an 0–2 deficit in the series to beat the Chicago Cubs 3 games to 2. He was also the losing pitcher in Game 1 of the 1984 World Series against the Detroit Tigers, giving up only three runs, but only lasting 5 innings. Thurmond also started Game 5, and although he only lasted 1/3 of an inning, he gave up three runs again but earned a no-decision this time.

For the 1985 season, Thurmond went 7–11 with a 3.97 ERA and started 23 of his 36 games. In 1986, Thurmond started the season 3–7 with a 6.50 ERA in his first 17 games (15 starts). On July 9, 1986, he was traded to the Detroit Tigers for pitcher Dave LaPoint.

=== Detroit Tigers (1986–87) ===
Thurmond really turned things around upon his arrival in Detroit, although it was mostly in the bullpen. He finished the year with the Tigers 4–1, with a 1.92 ERA in 25 games (4 starts). His next season with the Tigers was the first in which he didn't start a single game, as he went 0–1 with a 4.23 ERA in 48 games out of the bullpen. He made his final playoff appearance in Game 4 of the 1987 ALCS, pitching 1/3 of an inning without giving up a run. On February 26, 1988, the Tigers traded Thurmond to the Baltimore Orioles for Ray Knight.

=== Baltimore Orioles (1988–89) ===
Thurmond's first season with the Orioles, like their season in 1988, wasn't that great. He went 1–8 with a 4.58 ERA in 43 games (6 starts) while the Orioles finished last in the American League. The following season was better for Thurmond, as he went 2–4 with a 3.90 ERA in 49 games while pitching almost entirely out of the bullpen.

=== Houston Astros (1990) ===
On February 1, 1990, Thurmond signed with the Houston Astros. However, he didn't pitch with them at all. Instead, he pitched in nine games for the Tucson Toros, the Astros' AAA affiliate, posting a 3.27 ERA with no decisions. On May 1, he was sent to the San Francisco Giants as part of a conditional deal.

=== San Francisco Giants (1990) ===
Thurmond pitched reasonably well out of the bullpen for the Giants, going 2–3 with a 3.34 ERA in 43 games. However, 1990 was his final year in the major leagues. In 1991, he finished his career with the Phoenix Firebirds, the Giants AAA affiliate, going 0–3 with a 3.42 ERA in 26 games.

== Personal life ==
Thurmond resides in Katy, Texas, and works for an insurance business his father started.
