= Glenn Brummer =

American baseball player (born 1954)

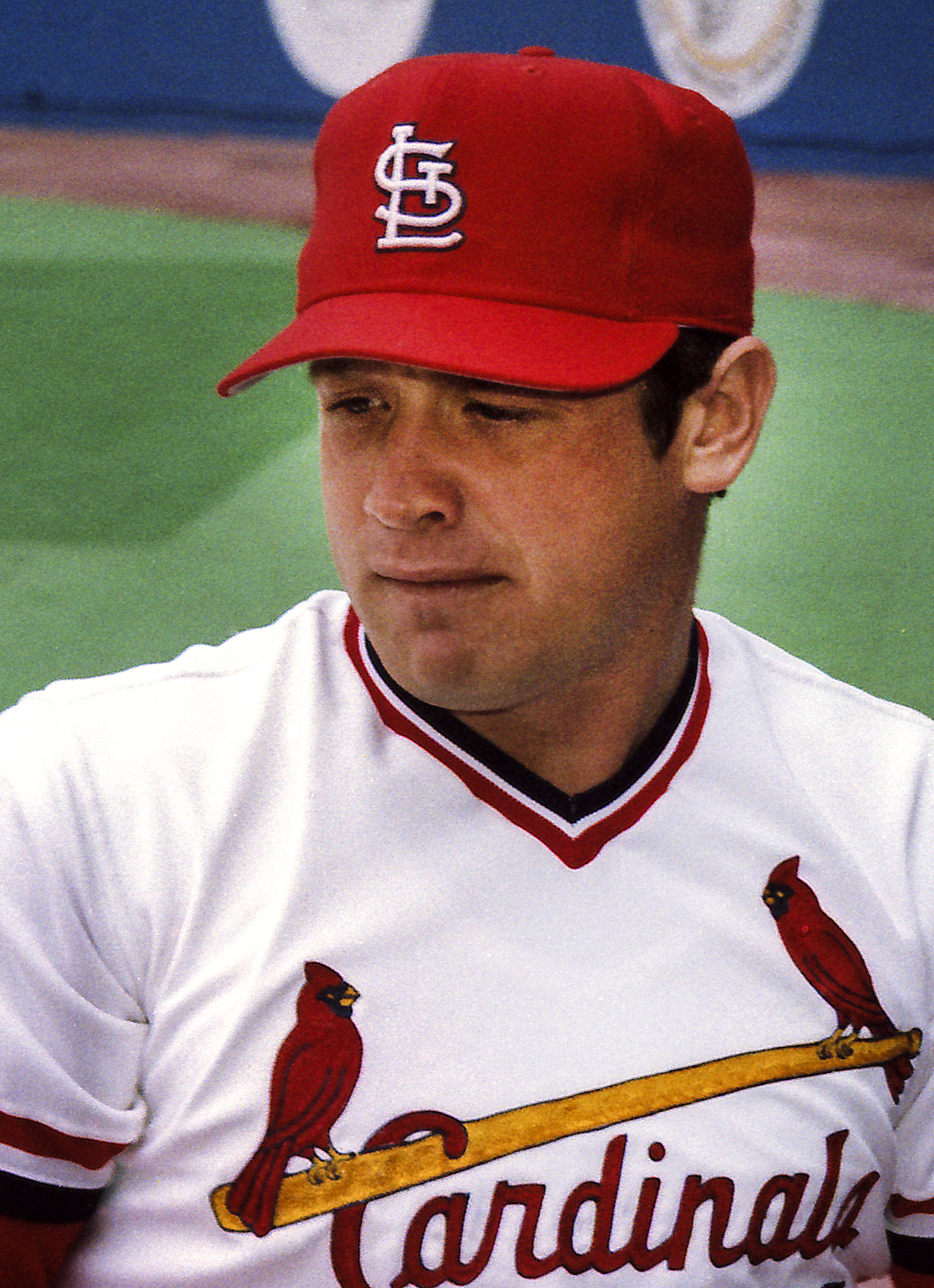
- Brummer with the St. Louis Cardinals in 1983
- Catcher
- Born: November 23, 1954 (age 71); Olney, Illinois, U.S.
- Batted: Right Threw: Right

MLB debut
- May 25, 1981, for the St. Louis Cardinals

Last MLB appearance
- October 6, 1985, for the Texas Rangers

MLB statistics
- Batting average: .251
- Home runs: 1
- Runs batted in: 27
- Stats at Baseball Reference

Teams
- St. Louis Cardinals (1981–1984); Texas Rangers (1985)

Career highlights and awards
- World Series champion (1982)

Glenn Edward Brummer (born November 23, 1954) is an American former Major League Baseball catcher who played for the St. Louis Cardinals and the Texas Rangers.

Brummer was born in Olney, Illinois. His father, Bob Brummer, briefly played minor league baseball. Glenn Brummer attended Effingham High School in Effingham, Illinois. After graduation, he was working on his family's farm when he heard that the Lake Land College baseball team needed a catcher. "It was either enroll in school or milk cows all my life," Brummer said. Signed by the Cardinals as an amateur free agent in 1974, he made his Major League Baseball debut with St. Louis on May 25, 1981.

On August 22, 1982, Brummer stole home plate with two outs in the bottom of the 12th inning to give the Cardinals a 5–4 win over the San Francisco Giants. A steal of home is a rare play, and the attempt was made especially unusual because there were two strikes on the Cardinals batter. With two strikes, a batter must be prepared to swing at a good pitch, and this normally prevents a runner from stealing home. Cardinals manager Whitey Herzog said that he did not plan Brummer's stolen base attempt. "Nobody knew he was coming. I didn't, either," Herzog said. This was one of four career stolen bases for Brummer.

Brummer was on the Cardinals postseason roster when they defeated the Milwaukee Brewers in the 1982 World Series. He did not play in the National League Championship Series and did not have any World Series plate appearances, but he played catcher in the ninth inning of World Series Game 6, which the Cardinals won 13–1.

On March 24, 1985, Brummer was released by the Cardinals. The next month, he signed with the Texas Rangers. Brummer appeared in his final major league game on October 6, 1985. He was released by the Rangers on November 13 of that year. Brummer's last season to play professional baseball was 1986, when he played 79 games for the Hawaii Islanders, the Triple-A affiliate of the Pittsburgh Pirates.
