= Mike Smith (pitcher, born 1961) =

American baseball player (born 1961)

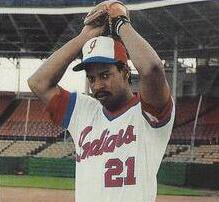
- Smith with the Indianapolis Indians c. 1987
- Pitcher
- Born: February 23, 1961 (age 65); Jackson, Mississippi, U.S.
- Batted: Right Threw: Right

MLB debut
- April 6, 1984, for the Cincinnati Reds

Last MLB appearance
- September 30, 1989, for the Pittsburgh Pirates

MLB statistics
- Win–loss record: 1–1
- Earned run average: 4.71
- Strikeouts: 26
- Stats at Baseball Reference

Teams
- Cincinnati Reds (1984–1986); Montreal Expos (1988); Pittsburgh Pirates (1989)

Michael Anthony Smith (born February 23, 1961) is an American former professional baseball player, a right-handed pitcher who worked in 33 Major League games over five seasons (1984–1986; 1988–1989) for the Cincinnati Reds, Montreal Expos and Pittsburgh Pirates. The native of Hinds County, Mississippi, stood 6 feet (1.8 m) tall and weighed 175 pounds (79 kg) as an active player.

== Career ==
Signed as an undrafted free agent by the Reds on May 11, 1981, Smith had a 15-year professional career; the first decade (1981–1990) was spent in "organized (Major and minor league) baseball", and then, after a five-year (1991–1995) hiatus, five seasons in independent league baseball (1996–2000).

All but one of his 33 big-league appearances came in relief. His Major League victory came in his third career appearance on April 8, 1984, against the Philadelphia Phillies at Riverfront Stadium. Smith relieved the Reds' Bill Scherrer in the top of the eleventh inning with two men on base and one out; the Phillies had pushed across a run against Scherrer and led, 7–6. Smith retired the two hitters he faced — Garry Maddox and eventual Hall of Famer Mike Schmidt — to end the threat. Cincinnati then scored two runs in the bottom of the 11th to win, 8–7.

In an odd coincidence, the losing pitcher when Smith earned his only victory was Larry Andersen. The winning pitcher when Smith (then with the Pittsburgh Pirates) lost his only game (August 15, 1989) was also Andersen (then with the Houston Astros).

All told, Smith worked in 492/3 innings pitched in the Majors, allowing 55 hits and 22 bases on balls. He struck out 26 and recorded one career save. His one save came on September 12, 1988 during an Expos blowout victory over the Cardinals.
