= Mark Calvert =

American baseball player (born 1956)

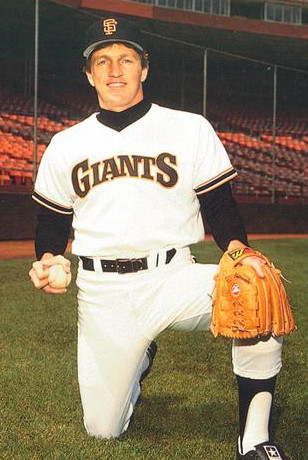
- Pitcher
- Born: September 29, 1956 (age 69); Tulsa, Oklahoma, U.S.
- Batted: Right Threw: Right

MLB debut
- April 17, 1983, for the San Francisco Giants

Last MLB appearance
- September 30, 1984, for the San Francisco Giants

MLB statistics
- Win–loss record: 3–8
- Earned run average: 5.71
- Strikeouts: 19
- Stats at Baseball Reference

Teams
- San Francisco Giants (1983–1984)

Mark Calvert (born September 29, 1956) is an American former pitcher in Major League Baseball. He played for the San Francisco Giants.

Calvert attended East Central High School in Tulsa before attending the University of Tulsa and playing baseball.
