= Tim Lollar =

American baseball player (born 1956)

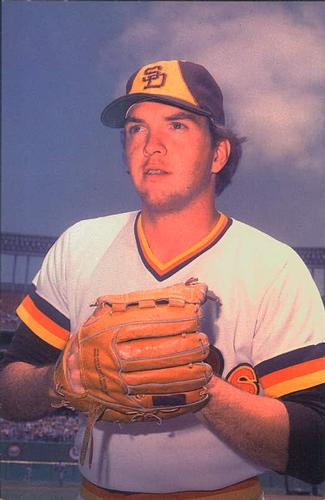
- Pitcher
- Born: March 17, 1956 (age 70); Poplar Bluff, Missouri, U.S.
- Batted: Left Threw: Left

MLB debut
- June 28, 1980, for the New York Yankees

Last MLB appearance
- October 5, 1986, for the Boston Red Sox

MLB statistics
- Win–loss record: 47–52
- Earned run average: 4.27
- Strikeouts: 600
- Stats at Baseball Reference

Teams
- New York Yankees (1980); San Diego Padres (1981–1984); Chicago White Sox (1985); Boston Red Sox (1985–1986)

William Timothy Lollar (born March 17, 1956) is an American former professional baseball pitcher. He was born in Poplar Bluff, Missouri to Homer and Betty Jean (née McHenry) Lollar. He was a graduate of Farmington High School in Farmington, Missouri and Mineral Area College in Flat River, Missouri. Lollar played all or parts of seven seasons in Major League Baseball from 1980 to 1986 for the New York Yankees (1980), San Diego Padres (1981–84), Chicago White Sox (1985), and Boston Red Sox (1985–86), primarily as a starting pitcher.

== Early career ==
Lollar played baseball for the University of Arkansas in Fayetteville. He was drafted by the Yankees in the fourth round of the 1978 Major League Baseball draft and was immediately assigned to the Double-A West Haven Yankees, two steps below the majors. He played 28 games as an infielder in 1978 and 65 games as an infielder in 1979 for the West Haven Yankees both years. Lollar made his major league debut in 1980 as a pitcher.

== Major league career ==
=== New York Yankees ===
Lollar debuted with the Yankees on June 26, 1980. He made 14 appearances for New York including one start. He went 1–0 with two saves and a 3.34 earned run average. Lollar was traded to the Padres near the end of spring training 1981, along with three other players, for outfielder Jerry Mumphrey and pitcher John Pacella.

=== San Diego Padres ===
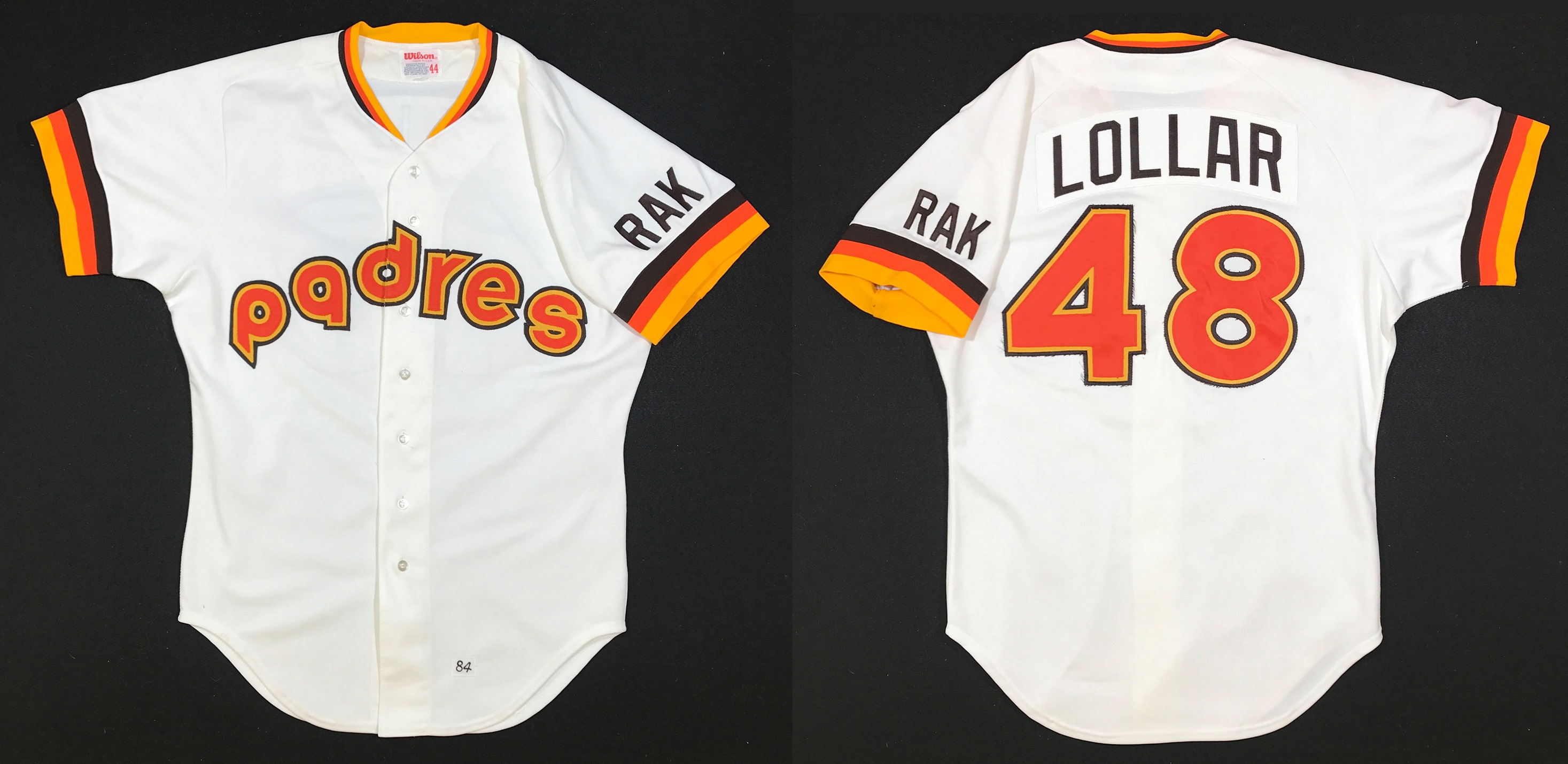
San Diego Padres 1984, #48 Tim Lollar home jersey

Lollar spent the strike-shortened 1981 season splitting time between the starting rotation and the bullpen for the Padres. He had a record of 2–8 in 24 games, including 11 starts, and an ERA of 6.10.

In 1982, Lollar was installed in the starting rotation permanently. He rewarded the Padres with a career-high 16 wins while lowering his ERA to 3.13. He was in turn rewarded by being made the Padres' Opening Day starter in 1983, but he slumped badly, posting a record of 7–12 with an ERA of 4.61. The Padres made the postseason for the first time as a franchise in 1984, with Lollar going 11–13 with a 3.91 ERA. He made two postseason starts—one each in the NLCS and the World Series—but did not make it out of the fifth inning in either one. In the third game of the World Series, against the Detroit Tigers, Lollar pitched only 1.2 innings and gave up four runs including a home run to Marty Castillo. After the season, he was traded to the White Sox, along with Ozzie Guillén, Bill Long, and Luis Salazar, primarily in exchange for LaMarr Hoyt.

=== Later career ===
Lollar stayed with the White Sox for just a few months before being traded to the Red Sox for outfielder Reid Nichols. In 1986, the Red Sox converted Lollar into a relief pitcher, but Lollar posted a 6.91 ERA while giving up nearly two baserunners per inning. While his 1986 season with the eventual American League champion Red Sox was forgettable, Lollar was undefeated, going 2–0. He had one win as a starter and one win as a relief pitcher. Lollar was released during spring training in 1987. Lollar played that season in the minors, posting a record of 3–4 with an ERA of 5.87 while splitting the year between the Detroit Tigers and St. Louis Cardinals organizations. He retired after the season. In his seven seasons, Lollar he had a 47–52 win–loss record, 199 games pitched, of which 131 were starts, nine complete games, four shutouts, 20 games finished, 906 innings pitched, 841 hits allowed, 459 runs allowed, 430 earned runs allowed, 93 home runs allowed, 480 walks allowed, of which 21 were intentional, 600 strikeouts and a 4.27 ERA. His career WHIP was 1.458.

=== As a hitter ===
Lollar was considered a particularly good hitter for a pitcher, being asked to occasionally pinch-hit, and hitting eight career home runs in four seasons in the National League. He posted a .234 batting average (54-for-231) with 27 runs, 38 RBI and 18 bases on balls. He was even called upon to pinch-hit for position players twice while with the American League Red Sox. The first was on August 13, 1985, when he pinch hit for shortstop Jackie Gutiérrez, popping out to third base. The second was on August 12, 1986, as Lollar pinch-hit for shortstop Rey Quiñones with two out in the ninth and the tying run on first base. Despite not having batted in a major league game in nearly a year, Lollar singled off Kansas City Royals closer Dan Quisenberry. Unfortunately for the Red Sox, the next batter, Wade Boggs, grounded out to end the game.
