= Bill Lyons =

American baseball player (born 1958)

- Second baseman
- Born: April 26, 1958 (age 68); Alton, Illinois, U.S.
- Batted: Right Threw: Right

MLB debut
- July 20, 1983, for the St. Louis Cardinals

Last MLB appearance
- September 30, 1984, for the St. Louis Cardinals

MLB statistics
- Batting average: .195
- Home runs: 0
- Runs batted in: 6
- Stats at Baseball Reference

Teams
- St. Louis Cardinals (1983–84)

William Allen Lyons (born April 26, 1958) is an American former Major League Baseball infielder. He played in parts of two seasons in the majors, 1983 and 1984, for the St. Louis Cardinals, primarily as a second baseman.
