= Greg Booker =

American baseball player (1960–2019)

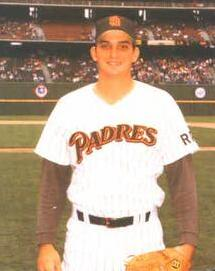
- Booker with the San Diego Padres c. 1985
- Pitcher
- Born: June 22, 1960; Lynchburg, Virginia, U.S.
- Died: March 30, 2019 (aged 58); Elon, North Carolina, U.S.
- Batted: Right Threw: Right

MLB debut
- September 11, 1983, for the San Diego Padres

Last MLB appearance
- May 26, 1990, for the San Francisco Giants

MLB statistics
- Win–loss record: 5–7
- Earned run average: 3.89
- Strikeouts: 119
- Stats at Baseball Reference

Teams
- San Diego Padres (1983–1989); Minnesota Twins (1989); San Francisco Giants (1990)

Gregory Scott Booker (June 22, 1960 – March 30, 2019) was an American professional baseball pitcher. He pitched in all or part of eight seasons in Major League Baseball, from 1983 until 1990. Booker's best season was in 1987. He made 44 relief appearances relief, posting a 3.16 ERA, winning 1 game and picking up his only career save on May 10, 1987, against the Cubs. Unusually, it came in a game that the Padres won by the lopsided score of 14–2. Booker pitched the final 3 innings to preserve the win for starting pitcher Ed Whitson. He also served as a coach for the San Diego Padres from 1997 until 2003, the first four years as bullpen coach, then a season-plus as pitching coach for AAA Syracuse Chiefs during the rise of Washington Nationals phenom pitcher Stephen Strasburg. He was a scout for the Los Angeles Dodgers.

Booker's widow, Kristi, is the daughter of long-time major league manager Jack McKeon. His son Zach Booker was a catcher in the minor leagues from 2007 until 2011. In 2022 he was hired on as head baseball coach for the D3 Guilford Quakers. His son Avery was the head baseball coach for Greensboro College in Greensboro, North Carolina.

On June 29, 1989, McKeon, often called "Trader Jack", traded his own son-in-law to the Minnesota Twins for pitcher Freddie Toliver.

He died of melanoma on March 30, 2019.
