= Andy Hawkins =

American baseball player & coach (born 1960)

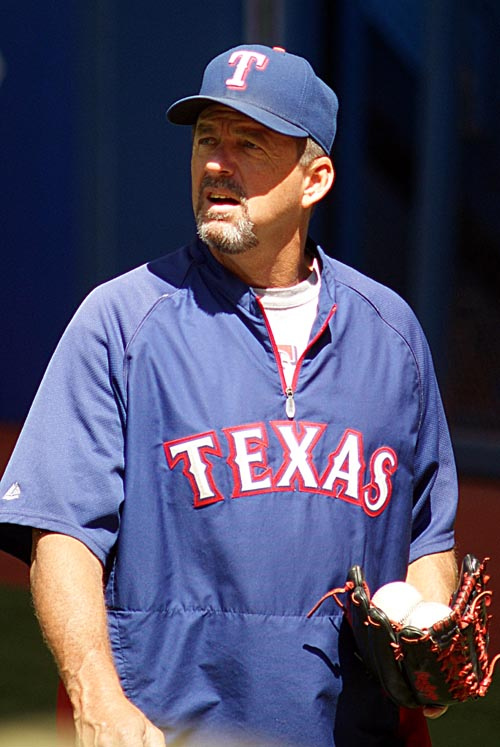
- Hawkins as Texas Rangers bullpen coach
- Pitcher / Coach
- Born: January 21, 1960 (age 66); Waco, Texas, U.S.
- Batted: Right Threw: Right

MLB debut
- July 17, 1982, for the San Diego Padres

Last MLB appearance
- August 4, 1991, for the Oakland Athletics

MLB statistics
- Win–loss record: 84–91
- Earned run average: 4.22
- Strikeouts: 706
- Stats at Baseball Reference

Teams
- As player: San Diego Padres (1982–1988); New York Yankees (1989–1991); Oakland Athletics (1991); As coach: Texas Rangers (2008–2015)

Melton Andrew Hawkins (born January 21, 1960) is an American former professional baseball pitcher and current coach. Hawkins spent most of his Major League Baseball (MLB) career with the San Diego Padres, and also played for the New York Yankees and briefly for the Oakland Athletics. He is currently the assistant pitching coach of the Salt Lake Bees.

== Baseball career ==
=== San Diego Padres ===
1984 Mother's Cookies photo of Hawkins for San Diego Padres

He won a combined total of 15 games in his first three seasons with San Diego. While he was mostly a starter in those seasons, he was utilized in relief for the surprise postseason run of the Padres in 1984. He was sent out for the fourth inning of Game 2 of the NLCS and the fifth inning of Game 4 before being tabbed to throw in relief early in Game 5, entering in the second inning and getting five outs with zero runs allowed; the Padres wound up winning the game to win the pennant. In the World Series, he was sent out to pitch in the sixth inning of Game 1 versus the Detroit Tigers, where he allowed one hit on eleven batters faced. Seven batters into Game 2, Hawkins was tabbed to go in relief and proceeded to allow one hit over the course of 5 1/3 innings as the Padres rallied to win the game, with Hawkins getting the decision and Craig Lefferts getting a three-inning save. In Game 5, with the Padres again needing relief early, he was tabbed to pitch with one out in the first inning. He went four innings. In the fifth inning of a tied game, he allowed a single and a walk before being taken out for Lefferts. He proceeded to allow the go-ahead run to score on a sacrifice fly that was tagged to Hawkins as Detroit rolled along to an eventual 8-4 win. Hawkins had 15 1/3 scoreless innings to start his postseason, a mark not broken for 32 years. In what wound up as his only postseason, Hawkins allowed one earned run on four hits with eight walks and five strikeouts in 15 2/3 innings.

His best season was 1985, when he threw a career-high 228 2/3 innings, compiled an 18–8 record (winning his first 11 starts), and finished with a 3.15 ERA. Hawkins is the first pitcher to win his first ten starts since the advent of divisional play in Major League Baseball which started in 1969. His 18 no decisions in 1986 were the most among MLB starting pitchers for that season.

=== New York Yankees ===
After six seasons in San Diego, Hawkins became a free agent after the 1988 season and signed a three-year contract with the New York Yankees in December 1988. This created big expectations for him, heightened when Yankee manager Dallas Green pronounced Hawkins the staff "anchor". Hawkins was the Yankees' most consistent starter in 1989, compiling a 15–15 record, a 4.80 ERA and an American League-leading 111 earned runs surrendered in 208 1/3 innings pitched. Tommy John thought Hawkins "would have been much better coming in not as a savior but simply as just another starting pitcher."

In the following year, Hawkins struggled for a very poor Yankees team. On May 8, with just one win and an ERA of 8.56, Hawkins was offered his outright release, which he accepted, although an injury that night to pitcher Mike Witt changed his mind. Hawkins pitched much better in his next three starts, although he still had only a 1–4 record three months into the season.

Hawkins allowed no hits while pitching a complete game but lost a 4–0 decision to the Chicago White Sox in the Yankees' final appearance at Comiskey Park on July 1, 1990. He retired both Ron Karkovice and Scott Fletcher on infield pop-outs to second baseman Steve Sax to start the eighth inning before Sammy Sosa reached first base safely on a fielding error by third baseman Mike Blowers. After Hawkins walked Ozzie Guillén and Lance Johnson to load the bases, the White Sox scored three unearned runs when a wind-aided ball hit by Robin Ventura glanced off left fielder Jim Leyritz's glove for a two-base error. The last run of the inning resulted from right fielder Jesse Barfield misplaying a ball hit by Iván Calderón by losing it in the sun and dropping it for another two-base error.

Major League Baseball does not consider this effort an official no-hitter, because Hawkins only completed eight innings pitched. On September 4, 1991, the Committee for Statistical Accuracy, appointed by commissioner Fay Vincent, changed the definition of a no-hitter to require that a pitcher must throw or a pitching staff combine for at least nine full innings and a complete game for the no-hitter to be official. Since Hawkins played for the visiting team, the White Sox never batted in the ninth inning, meaning Hawkins lost credit for a no-hitter. The game was also notable for being a double no-hitter into the sixth inning (and a double perfect game into the fifth), as White Sox starter Greg Hibbard retired the first 16 batters he faced before Bob Geren reached base on an infield single in the sixth.

In his next appearance on July 6, he faced the Minnesota Twins at Yankee Stadium in the opening game of a doubleheader. Hawkins pitched a shutout into the twelfth inning but wound up losing 2–0. Since then, no starting pitcher has pitched in an MLB game into the twelfth inning or later.

In his following appearance on July 12 in the Bronx, the Yankees lost a six-inning no-hitter to Mélido Pérez and the White Sox. Likewise, that game is not considered an official no-hitter, as the game was shortened to seven innings due to rain. This stretch of three unlucky starts was followed with his worst start of the season, at home on July 17 against the Kansas City Royals. Hawkins labored through 4 1/3 innings and surrendered eight runs on the strength of four homeruns, including three by Bo Jackson, and took the loss in a 10-7 Kansas City victory. Hawkins finished 1990 with a 5–12 record and a 5.37 ERA in 157 2/3 innings pitched.

Hawkins started off the 1991 season poorly as well, appearing in four games and going 0–2 before being taken out of the rotation, giving up 14 earned runs in 12 1/3 innings. The Yankees released Hawkins on May 9, two days after he lasted only 2 1/3 innings and surrendered four earned runs and five hits (including two homeruns) to the California Angels on May 7 in Anaheim. He signed with the Oakland Athletics more than a week later; he compiled a 4–4 record with a 4.79 ERA in 77 innings before the Athletics released him in mid-August. In what would be his final major league appearance on August 4 against the Twins in Oakland Hawkins faced only one batter, striking out Scott Leius swinging.

In his three seasons in the American League, Hawkins also struggled mightily while pitching in Fenway Park. In three career starts there against the Boston Red Sox, Hawkins managed a total of just one inning, giving up 18 earned runs.

=== Coaching ===
Hawkins was the bullpen coach of the Texas Rangers, having served as the interim pitching coach following the firing of previous pitching coach Mark Connor during the 2008 season. Before being promoted as the interim coach, Hawkins was the pitching coach for the Oklahoma RedHawks. At the end of the 2015 season Hawkins left the Rangers. In 2016 Hawkins was hired on as the pitching coach for the Kansas City Royals AAA team, the Omaha Storm Chasers. On February 16, 2024, Hawkins was named assistant pitching coach of the Salt Lake Bees which is the Los Angeles Angels' Triple-A team.
