= Jeff Cornell =

American baseball player (born 1957)

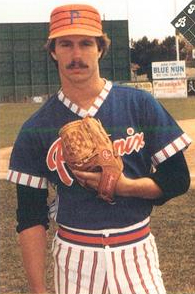
- Cornell with Phoenix Giants c. 1983
- Pitcher
- Born: February 10, 1957 (age 69); Kansas City, Missouri, U.S.
- Batted: Switch Threw: Right

MLB debut
- June 2, 1984, for the San Francisco Giants

Last MLB appearance
- August 16, 1984, for the San Francisco Giants

MLB statistics
- Win–loss record: 1–3
- Earned run average: 6.10
- Strikeouts: 19
- Stats at Baseball Reference

Teams
- San Francisco Giants (1984)

Jeffery Ray Cornell (born February 10, 1957) is a retired Major League Baseball pitcher. He played during the 1984 season at the major league level for the San Francisco Giants. He was drafted by the Kansas City Royals in the 8th round of the 1978 draft. Cornell played his first professional season with their Rookie League Gulf Coast League Royals in 1978. He was traded to the Giants in 1982. Cornell played his last season with the Chicago Cubs' Triple-A team, the Iowa Cubs, in 1986.

After the end of his playing career, Cornell became a scout for the Toronto Blue Jays, Milwaukee Brewers, and in 2008 for the Tampa Bay Rays, his current position.

== Personal ==
Cornell has three children: Erin, Megan, and Jayce. His wife's name is Tammy.

== Sources ==
- "Jeff Cornell". Society for American Baseball Research. Retrieved on 2 March 2009.
