= Fran Mullins =

American baseball player (born 1957)

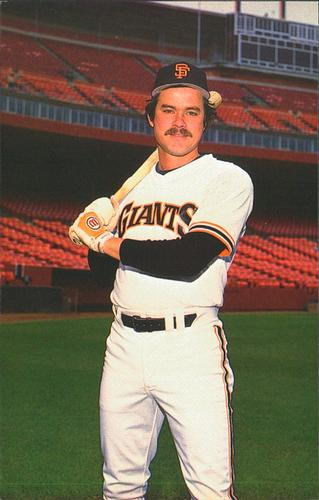
- Infielder
- Born: May 14, 1957 (age 68); Oakland, California, U.S.
- Batted: Right Threw: Right

MLB debut
- September 1, 1980, for the Chicago White Sox

Last MLB appearance
- September 30, 1986, for the Cleveland Indians

MLB statistics
- Batting average: .203
- Home runs: 2
- Runs batted in: 18
- Stats at Baseball Reference

Teams
- Chicago White Sox (1980); San Francisco Giants (1984); Cleveland Indians (1986)

Francis Joseph Mullins (born May 14, 1957) is an American former professional baseball player. He played in Major League Baseball (MLB) as an infielder. Mullins played at least one game at all four infield positions, but saw most of his playing time at third base and shortstop.

== Career ==
Mullins attended Santa Clara University, and played college baseball for the Santa Clara Broncos. He was drafted by the Chicago White Sox in the 1978 and 1979 amateur drafts. After the 1979 draft, Mullins went professional.

Mullins made his MLB debut with the White Sox in 1980. After the 1983 season, the White Sox traded Mullins to the Cincinnati Reds for Steve Christmas. Weeks later, he was selected by the San Francisco Giants in the Rule 5 draft. He saw his greatest amount of playing time with the Giants in 1984, when he batted .218 with 2 home runs in 52 games. After playing in minor league baseball in 1985, the Cleveland Indians purchased Mullins from the Giants. Mullins played for the Indians in 1986, and was released after the season.
