= Sandberg Game =

Baseball game

June 23, 1984 Chicago Cubs–St. Louis Cardinals game
	1	2	3	4	5	6	7	8	9	10	11	R	H	E
St. Louis Cardinals	1	6	0	0	0	2	0	0	0	2	0	11	13	1
Chicago Cubs	1	0	0	0	2	5	0	0	1	2	1	12	14	2
- Date: June 23, 1984
- Venue: Wrigley Field
- City: Chicago, Illinois
- Managers: Whitey Herzog (STL); Jim Frey (CHC)
- Attendance: 38,079
- Television: NBC
- TV announcers: Bob Costas and Tony Kubek
- Radio: WGN (CHC); KMOX (STL)
- Radio announcers: Milo Hamilton, Vince Lloyd, Lou Boudreau, and Harry Caray; Jack Buck, Mike Shannon, and Dan Kelly

On June 23, 1984, the Chicago Cubs took on the St. Louis Cardinals in a Major League Baseball contest that saw Willie McGee hit for the cycle, but Ryne Sandberg hit two home runs—in the ninth and tenth innings—to propel the Cubs to a 12–11 victory. The Cubs overcame deficits of 7–1, 9–3, and 11–9 as Sandberg hit a pair of game-tying home runs in late-inning action, both off ex-Cubs closer Bruce Sutter. NBC play-by-play announcer Bob Costas, who called the game with Tony Kubek, is remembered for saying "Do you believe it?!" when Sandberg hit the second home run. The game is known as the Sandberg Game.

After winning a Gold Glove Award in his first season at a new position (second base), Sandberg emerged with a breakout season in 1984, in which he batted .314 with 200 hits, 114 runs, 36 doubles, 19 triples, 19 home runs, and 84 RBIs. Bob Dernier was the leadoff hitter and gold glove center fielder for the Cubs in 1984, while Sandberg batted second. The pair was dubbed "The Daily Double" by Cubs announcer Harry Caray.

== Background ==
After over a dozen more subpar seasons, in 1981 the Cubs hired General Manager (GM) Dallas Green from the Philadelphia Phillies to turn around the franchise. Green had managed the 1980 Phillies to the World Series title. One of his early GM moves brought in a young Phillies minor-league third baseman (3B) named Ryne Sandberg, along with Larry Bowa for Iván DeJesús. The 1983 Cubs had finished 71–91 under Lee Elia, who was fired by Green before the season ended. Green continued the culture of change and overhauled the Cubs roster, front-office and coaching staff prior to 1984. Jim Frey was hired to manage the 1984 Cubs, along with Don Zimmer to coach third base and Billy Connors serving as pitching coach.

Green improved the 1984 roster with a series of transactions. In December 1983 Scott Sanderson was acquired from the Montreal Expos in a three-team deal with the San Diego Padres for Carmelo Martínez. Pinch hitter Richie Hebner (.333 BA in 1984) was signed as a free-agent. During spring training, moves continued: left fielder (LF) Gary Matthews and Center fielder (CF) Bob Dernier came from Philadelphia on March 26, for Bill Campbell and a minor leaguer. Reliever Tim Stoddard (10–6 3.82, 7 saves) was acquired the same day for a minor leaguer; veteran pitcher Ferguson Jenkins was released. On May 25, the Cubs traded Bill Buckner to the Red Sox for Dennis Eckersley and Mike Brumley.

The team's commitment to contend was complete when Green made another move on June 15 to shore up the starting rotation, due to injuries to Rick Reuschel (5–5) and Scott Sanderson. The deal brought 1979 NL Rookie of the Year pitcher Rick Sutcliffe from the Cleveland Indians. Joe Carter (who was with the Triple-A Iowa Cubs at the time) and right fielder (RF) Mel Hall were sent to Cleveland for Sutcliffe and back-up catcher (C) Ron Hassey (.333 with Cubs in 1984). Sutcliffe (5–5 with the Indians) immediately joined Sanderson (8–5 3.14), Eckersley (10–8 3.03), Steve Trout (13–7 3.41), Chuck Rainey (5-7 4.28) and Dick Ruthven (6–10 5.04) in the starting rotation. Sutcliffe went 16–1 for the Cubs and captured the Cy Young Award.

The Cubs 1984 starting lineup was very strong. It consisted of LF Gary Matthews (.291 14–82 101 runs 17 SB), C Jody Davis (.256 19–94), RF Keith Moreland (.279 16–80), shortstop (SS) Larry Bowa (.223 10 SB), first baseman (1B) Leon "Bull" Durham (.279 23–96 16SB), CF Dernier (.278 45 SB), 3B Ron Cey (.240 25–97), closer Lee Smith (9–7 3.65 33 saves), and the 1984 NL MVP second baseman (2B) Ryne Sandberg (.314 19–84 114 runs, 19 triples, 32 SB).

At the top of the order, Dernier and Sandberg were exciting; that season they would go on to total a combined 77 steals and 208 runs scored, along with Sandberg's 74 extra-base hits. With strong defense – Dernier CF and Sandberg 2B both won the NL Gold Glove – solid pitching and clutch hitting, the Cubs were a well-balanced team. Following the "Daily Double", Matthews, Durham, Cey, Moreland and Davis gave the Cubs an order with no gaps to pitch around. Sutcliffe anchored a deep starting rotation, and Smith was one of the top closers in the game.

The Cubs opened up the 1984 season going 12–8 in April, and were tied for first place with the New York Mets and a half-game ahead of the Philadelphia Phillies.

On May 27 against the Cincinnati Reds in Wrigley Field, third baseman Ron Cey hit what was originally ruled a home run down the left field line. Believing the ball had gone foul, Mario Soto and Reds manager Vern Rapp disputed the call, and during the argument, Soto shoved third base umpire Steve Rippley, who had made the call. After conferring, the umpires changed their decision and ruled it a foul ball, drawing a protest from the Cubs. However, for shoving Rippley, Soto was ejected, prompting him to charge the field and attack Cubs coach Don Zimmer, which triggered a ten-minute brawl. Four days later, National League president Chub Feeney suspended Mario Soto for five games. This game is also notable because Soto's opponent that day was Dennis Eckersley, who would go on to become a record-setting closer years later. Eckersley, who was making his Cubs debut, would take the loss that day.

The National League East race stayed tight through the first half of the season, with the Cubs and Phillies tied at 42–34 on June 30, and the Mets trailing by just one and a half games. The second half of the season was different, with the Cubs posting a 54–31 record, the Mets trailing, and the Phillies slumping back to a .500 record.

== Game ==
One game in particular was cited for putting twenty-four-year-old second baseman Ryne Sandberg (as well as the 1984 Cubs in general) "on the map", an NBC national telecast of a Cardinals–Cubs game on June 23, 1984. The Cubs had been playing well throughout the season's first few months, but as a team unaccustomed to winning, they had not yet become a serious contender in the eyes of most baseball fans.

As for Sandberg, he had played two full seasons in the major leagues, and while he had shown himself to be a top-fielding second baseman and fast on the basepaths (over 30 stolen bases both seasons), his .260-ish batting average and single-digit home run production were respectable for his position but not especially noteworthy, and Sandberg was not talked about outside Chicago. But now the Game of the Week broadcast put the sleeper Cubs on the national stage against their regional rival, the St. Louis Cardinals. Both teams were well-established franchises with strong fan bases outside the Chicago and St. Louis areas.

St. Louis struck first in the first inning when George Hendrick singled home Ozzie Smith. The Cubs answered back in the bottom of the first when Bob Dernier singled, stole second and scored on Sandberg's single. The Cards then scored six runs in the second inning to take a 7–1 lead, highlighted by Willie McGee's three-run triple that chased Cubs starter Steve Trout out of the game. It stayed that way until the bottom of the fifth when the Cubs added two runs — Sandberg's groundout scored Jay Johnstone and Gary Matthews singled home Dernier. The Cardinals responded in their sixth when McGee hit a two run homer. The Cubs then scored five runs in the bottom of the sixth. Pinch hitter Richie Hebner singled home Keith Moreland. Dernier followed with a two run double scoring Ron Cey and Larry Bowa, and Sandberg singled home Hebner and Dernier (Sandberg's third hit of the game).

The Cardinals, with a 9–8 lead going into the bottom of the ninth, had closer Bruce Sutter on the mound. Sutter was at the forefront of the emergence of relievers in the late 1970s and early 1980s, making six All-Star teams and winning (as a Cub) the Cy Young Award in 1979. Sandberg, not yet known for his power, slugged a home run into the left-field bleachers against the Cardinals' ace closer, tying the game at nine.

Despite this dramatic act, the Cardinals scored two runs in the top of the tenth to regain the lead. Ozzie Smith singled, stole second, and scored on McGee's double. By this point, McGee had hit for the cycle, had six RBI, and was already announced as NBC's "Player of the Game". McGee then scored on an RBI groundout from Steve Braun to make it 11–9 St. Louis.

Sutter stayed in the game attempting to close out the win. After Sutter retired the first two batters, Dernier walked, bringing up Sandberg again in the tenth inning, facing a determined Sutter with one man on base. He promptly hit another game-tying home run into the left-field bleachers, sending the Wrigley fans into a frenzy. As Cubs' radio announcer Harry Caray described it:

There's a drive, way back! Might be outta here! It is! It is! He did it again! He did it again! The game is tied! The game is tied! HOLY COW! Listen to this crowd! Everybody's gone bananas!

The Cardinals did not score in the top of the 11th, but the Cubs loaded the bases on three walks, two of them intentional after Leon Durham stole second and advanced to third on catcher Darrell Porter's throwing error. Pinch hitter Dave Owen then singled Durham home with the winning run. Ryne Sandberg had seven RBI in the game. Henceforth, this game has become known as "The Sandberg Game". NBC later reported that McGee and Sandberg would share the "Player of the Game" honor.

=== Calls ===
As previously mentioned, Bob Costas called NBC's Game of the Week with Tony Kubek, where Ryne Sandberg hit two separate home runs in the 9th and 10th innings against Bruce Sutter to tie the game.

Costas's call of the first home run:

Into left center field, and deep. This is a tie ball game!

Costas's call of the second home run:

Costas: 1–1 pitch. [Sandberg swings]
Kubek: OHHH BOY!
Costas: [Over Kubek] And he hits it to deep left center! Look out! Do you believe it, it's gone! We will go to the 11th, tied at 11.

After Sandberg hit his second home run in the game (with two out in the bottom of the 10th to tie it 11–11), Costas cried "That's the real Roy Hobbs because this can't be happening! We're sitting here, and it doesn't make any difference if it's 1984 or '54 — just freeze this and don't change a thing!"

=== Linescore ===
Team	1	2	3	4	5	6	7	8	9	10	11	R	H	E
St. Louis Cardinals (34–37)	1	6	0	0	0	2	0	0	0	2	0	11	13	1
Chicago Cubs (37–31)	1	0	0	0	2	5	0	0	1	2	1	12	14	2
WP: Lee Smith (4–4) LP: Dave Rucker (1–1); Home runs: STL: Willie McGee (2); CHC: Ryne Sandberg 2 (8, 9)

== Aftermath ==
The Cubs ended their playoff drought on September 24 at Three Rivers Stadium in front of just over 5,000 fans, many of whom were Cubs fans. Rick Sutcliffe threw a two-hit complete game for his fourteenth straight victory, and the Cubs won the National League East.

In the NLCS, the Cubs easily won the first two games at Wrigley Field against the San Diego Padres. The Padres were the winners of the Western Division with Steve Garvey, Tony Gwynn, Eric Show, Goose Gossage and Alan Wiggins. With wins of 13–0 and 4–2, the Cubs needed to win only one game of the next three in San Diego to make it to the World Series. After being beaten in Game 3 7–1, the Cubs lost Game 4 when Smith, with the game tied 5–5, allowed a walk-off home run to Garvey in the bottom of the ninth inning. In Game 5 the Cubs took a 3–0 lead into the 6th inning, and a 3–2 lead into the seventh with Sutcliffe (who won the Cy Young Award that year) still on the mound. Then, Leon Durham had a sharp grounder go under his glove. This critical error helped the Padres win the game 6–3, with a 4-run 7th inning and keep Chicago out of the 1984 World Series against the Detroit Tigers.

In 1984, Sandberg's runs and triples totals led the National League. He nearly became only the third player to collect 20 doubles, triples, home runs, and stolen bases in the same season, led the Cubs to the National League's Eastern Division title (their first championship of any kind since 1945), and won the National League Most Valuable Player Award, the first by a Cub since Ernie Banks' back-to-back honors in 1958 and 1959.

After his great season in which he garnered national attention, he wrote an autobiography Ryno with Fred Mitchell.

ESPN replayed significant portions of the game prior to Sandberg's Hall of Fame induction in 2005, which show Sutter turning and shouting "Damn!" to himself when Sandberg hit the second one. However, Sutter later credited that replaying with helping him achieve his own Hall of Fame election the following year.

Sandberg died on July 28, 2025, at the age of 65.

== See also ==
- Cardinals–Cubs rivalry
- List of events at Wrigley Field
- List of nicknamed MLB games and plays
