= 1984 Chicago Cubs season =

Major League Baseball club season

1984 Chicago Cubs
- National League East champions
- League: National League
- Division: East
- Ballpark: Wrigley Field
- City: Chicago
- Record: 96–65 (.596)
- Divisional place: 1st
- Owners: Tribune Company
- General managers: Dallas Green
- Managers: Jim Frey
- Television: WGN-TV/Superstation WGN (Harry Caray, Steve Stone, Milo Hamilton)
- Radio: WGN (Milo Hamilton, Vince Lloyd, Lou Boudreau, Harry Caray)
- Stats: ESPN.com; Baseball Reference

The 1984 Chicago Cubs season was the 113th season of the Chicago Cubs franchise, the 109th in the National League and the 69th at Wrigley Field. The Cubs finished with a record of 96 wins and 65 losses in first place of the National League East (the team's first winning season in 12 years). Chicago was managed by Jim Frey and the general manager was Dallas Green. The Cubs' postseason appearance in this season was their first since 1945. The Cubs pitching staff included 1984 Cy Young Award winner Rick Sutcliffe, and the lineup included 1984 Baseball Most Valuable Player Award winner second baseman Ryne Sandberg. Frey was awarded Manager of the Year for the National League for leading the Cubs to 96 victories. The Cubs were defeated in the 1984 National League Championship Series by the San Diego Padres three games to two.

== Offseason ==
- January 17, 1984: Damon Berryhill was drafted by the Cubs in the 1st round (4th pick) of the 1984 Major League Baseball draft. Player signed June 2, 1984.
- March 26, 1984: Bill Campbell and Mike Diaz were traded by the Cubs to the Philadelphia Phillies for Porfi Altamirano, Gary Matthews and Bob Dernier.
- March 31, 1984: Alan Hargesheimer was traded by the Cubs to the Kansas City Royals for Don Werner and Derek Botelho.

=== Spring training ===
The Cubs began their third season under the control of the Tribune Company and Dallas Green in Mesa, Arizona in February 1984. The previous year, the Cubs had fired manager Lee Elia during a 71–91 campaign, but the Cubs showed flashes of being competitive. As late as July 4, the Cubs were within a game of first place. After the 1983 season, general manager Green hired Jim Frey, the former Kansas City Royals manager who was Green's adversary during the 1980 World Series.

The Cubs opened camp with only a few new players. Richie Hebner, the former Pittsburgh Pirate, was signed as a free agent. The Cubs also made a three-way deal with San Diego and Montreal, sending Craig Lefferts and Carmelo Martínez to the Padres, and getting Scott Sanderson from the Expos.

The Cubs struggled in Cactus League action, so Green began to rebuild the team before it left Mesa. Green began by releasing Ferguson Jenkins, who was just 16 games shy of winning 300 games. Jenkins' release ended the right-hander's second stint with the Cubs, and effectively, his career. Green's biggest move of the spring came on March 26, when he sent journeyman reliever Bill Campbell and catcher Mike Diaz to Philadelphia for pitcher Porfi Altamirano and outfielders Gary Matthews and Bob Dernier.

== Regular season ==
=== Season summary ===
The Cubs rebuilt the starting pitching staff through a series of trades by Dallas Green after a disappointing 1983 season where they went 71–91. Green had been brought to the Cubs by the Tribune company which purchased the team in 1981. Before the season started, Green dealt Carmelo Martínez, Craig Lefferts, and Fritzie Connally to acquire right-hander Scott Sanderson. On May 25, the Cubs traded Bill Buckner to the Boston Red Sox for righty Dennis Eckersley and Mike Brumley. Finally on June 13, Mel Hall, Joe Carter, Don Schulze, and Darryl Banks were sent to the Cleveland Indians for starter Rick Sutcliffe, George Frazier, and Ron Hassey. The acquisition of these three starters solidified the rotation for the year.

The Cubs opened up the season going 12–8 in April, and were tied for first place with the New York Mets and a half-game ahead of the Philadelphia Phillies.

On May 27 against the Cincinnati Reds in Wrigley Field, third baseman Ron Cey hit what was originally ruled a home run down the left field line. Believing the ball had gone foul, Mario Soto and Reds manager Vern Rapp disputed the call, and during the argument, Soto shoved third base umpire Steve Rippley, who had made the call. After conferring, the umpires changed their decision and ruled it a foul ball, drawing a protest from the Cubs. However, for shoving Rippley, Soto was ejected, prompting him to charge the field and attack Cubs coach Don Zimmer, which triggered a ten-minute brawl. Four days later, National League president Chub Feeney suspended Mario Soto for five games. This game is also notable because Soto's opponent that day was Dennis Eckersley, who would go on to become a record-setting closer years later. "Eck", who was making his Cubs debut after being acquired in a trade with the Boston Red Sox (the Cubs traded Bill Buckner and got Eckersley and then-minor league middle infielder Mike Brumley), would take the loss that day.

The race stayed tight through the first half of the season, with the Cubs and Phillies tied at 42–34 on June 30, with the Mets trailing by just one and a half games. The second half of the season was different, with the Cubs posting a 54–31 record, with the Mets trailing, and the Phillies slumping back to a .500 record.

A key game during the season occurred on June 23 at Wrigley, with the Cubs facing the rival St. Louis Cardinals on the nationally televised "game of the week". The Cardinals led throughout the game, and led 9-8 going into the bottom of the ninth with closer Bruce Sutter on the mound. Twenty-four-year-old second baseman Ryne Sandberg led off the ninth with a solo home run into the left-field bleachers, tying the game at nine. The following inning, St. Louis regained the lead, and Sutter stayed in the game attempting to close out the win. After the first two batters were retired, Bob Dernier walked, bringing up Sandberg again. He promptly hit another game-tying home run into the left-field bleachers, sending the Wrigley fans into a frenzy. The Cardinals did not score in the top of the 11th, but the Cubs loaded the bases on three walks, then rookie Dave Owen singled in the winning run. Ryne Sandberg had 7 RBI in the game. Henceforth, this game has become known as "The Sandberg Game". On September 3, 1984, Rick Sutcliffe had 15 strikeouts in a game against the Philadelphia Phillies.

The Cubs ended their playoff drought on September 24 at Three Rivers Stadium in front of just over 5,000 fans, many of whom were Cubs fans. Rick Sutcliffe threw a two-hit complete game for his sixteenth straight victory, and the Cubs won the National League East.

=== Opening Day starters ===
- Larry Bowa
- Ron Cey
- Jody Davis
- Bob Dernier
- Leon Durham
- Gary Matthews
- Keith Moreland
- Dick Ruthven
- Ryne Sandberg

=== Season standings ===
NL East
| Team | W | L | Pct. | GB | Home | Road |
|---|---|---|---|---|---|---|
| Chicago Cubs | 96 | 65 | .596 | — | 51‍–‍29 | 45‍–‍36 |
| New York Mets | 90 | 72 | .556 | 6½ | 48‍–‍33 | 42‍–‍39 |
| St. Louis Cardinals | 84 | 78 | .519 | 12½ | 44‍–‍37 | 40‍–‍41 |
| Philadelphia Phillies | 81 | 81 | .500 | 15½ | 39‍–‍42 | 42‍–‍39 |
| Montreal Expos | 78 | 83 | .484 | 18 | 39‍–‍42 | 39‍–‍41 |
| Pittsburgh Pirates | 75 | 87 | .463 | 21½ | 41‍–‍40 | 34‍–‍47 |

=== Record vs. opponents ===
1984 National League record Sources:
| Team | ATL | CHC | CIN | HOU | LAD | MON | NYM | PHI | PIT | SD | SF | STL |
|---|---|---|---|---|---|---|---|---|---|---|---|---|
| Atlanta | — | 3–9 | 13–5 | 12–6 | 6–12 | 5–7 | 4–8 | 7–5 | 8–4 | 7–11 | 10–8 | 5–7 |
| Chicago | 9–3 | — | 7–5 | 6–6 | 7–5 | 10–7 | 12–6 | 9–9 | 8–10 | 6–6 | 9–3 | 13–5 |
| Cincinnati | 5–13 | 5–7 | — | 8–10 | 7–11 | 7–5 | 3–9 | 5–7 | 7–5 | 7–11 | 12–6 | 4–8 |
| Houston | 6–12 | 6–6 | 10–8 | — | 9–9 | 7–5 | 4–8 | 6–6 | 6–6 | 6–12 | 12–6 | 8–4 |
| Los Angeles | 12–6 | 5–7 | 7–11 | 9–9 | — | 6–6 | 3–9 | 3–9 | 4–8 | 10–8 | 10–8 | 6–6 |
| Montreal | 7–5 | 7–10 | 5–7 | 5–7 | 6–6 | — | 7–11 | 11–7 | 7–11 | 7–5 | 7–5 | 9–9 |
| New York | 8–4 | 6–12 | 9–3 | 8–4 | 9–3 | 11–7 | — | 10–8 | 12–6 | 6–6 | 4–8 | 7–11 |
| Philadelphia | 5-7 | 9–9 | 7–5 | 6–6 | 9–3 | 7–11 | 8–10 | — | 7–11 | 7–5 | 8–4 | 8–10 |
| Pittsburgh | 4–8 | 10–8 | 5–7 | 6–6 | 8–4 | 11–7 | 6–12 | 11–7 | — | 4–8 | 6–6 | 4–14 |
| San Diego | 11–7 | 6–6 | 11–7 | 12–6 | 8–10 | 5–7 | 6–6 | 5–7 | 8–4 | — | 13–5 | 7–5 |
| San Francisco | 8–10 | 3–9 | 6–12 | 6–12 | 8–10 | 5–7 | 8–4 | 4–8 | 6–6 | 5–13 | — | 7–5 |
| St. Louis | 7–5 | 5–13 | 8–4 | 4–8 | 6–6 | 9–9 | 11–7 | 10–8 | 14–4 | 5–7 | 5–7 | — |

=== Notable transactions ===
- May 25, 1984: Bill Buckner was traded by the Cubs to the Boston Red Sox for Dennis Eckersley and Mike Brumley.
- June 4, 1984: 1984 Major League Baseball draft
  - Greg Maddux was drafted by the Cubs in the 2nd round. Player signed June 19, 1984.
- June 13, 1984: Mel Hall, Joe Carter, Don Schulze, and Darryl Banks (minors) were traded by the Cubs to the Cleveland Indians for Rick Sutcliffe, George Frazier and Ron Hassey.
- July 2, 1984: Dickie Noles was traded by the Cubs to the Texas Rangers for players to be named later. The Rangers completed the deal by sending Tim Henry (minors) and Jorge Gomez (minors) to the Cubs on December 11.

== Roster ==
1984 Chicago Cubs
Roster
| Pitchers: 33 Porfi Altamirano; 42 Rich Bordi; 41 Warren Brusstar; 43 Dennis Eckersley; 39 George Frazier; 37 Bill Johnson; 38 Ron Meridith; 48 Dickie Noles; 52 Reggie Patterson; 30 Chuck Rainey; 47,48 Rick Reuschel; 44 Dick Ruthven; 24 Scott Sanderson; 43 Don Schulze; 46 Lee Smith; 49 Tim Stoddard; 40 Rick Sutcliffe; 34 Steve Trout | Catchers: 7 Jody Davis; 15 Ron Hassey; 16 Steve Lake; Infielders: 1 Larry Bowa; 22 Bill Buckner; 11 Ron Cey; 10 Leon Durham; 18 Richie Hebner; 19 Dave Owen; 17 Dan Rohn; 23 Ryne Sandberg; 29 Tom Veryzer | Outfielders: 27 Thad Bosley; 28 Henry Cotto; 20 Bob Dernier; 27 Mel Hall; 22 Billy Hatcher; 21 Jay Johnstone; 12 Davey Lopes; 36 Gary Matthews; 6 Keith Moreland; 25 Gary Woods | Manager: 8 Jim Frey; Coaches: 5 Rubén Amaro; 3 Billy Connors; 9 Johnny Oates; 2 John Vukovich; 4 Don Zimmer |

== Game log ==
1984 Game Log
April (12-8)

| # | Date | Opponent | Score | Win | Loss | Save | Attendance | Record | Other Info |
|---|---|---|---|---|---|---|---|---|---|
| 1 | April 3 | @ Giants | 5 – 3 | Ruthven (1–0) | M. Davis (0–1) | Smith (1) | 52,700 | 1-0 | Opening Day |
| 2 | April 5 | @ Giants | 11 – 7 | Rainey (1–0) | Krukow (0–1) | Smith (2) | 8,460 | 2-0 | |
| 3 | April 6 | @ Padres | 3 – 2 | Monge (1–0) | Smith (0–1) | | 15,835 | 2-1 | |
| 4 | April 7 | @ Padres | 7 – 6 | Dravecky (1–0) | Trout (0–1) | Gossage (2) | 27,799 | 2-2 | |
| 5 | April 8 | @ Padres | 8 – 5 | Smith (1-1) | Thurmond (0–1) | | 24,285 | 3-2 | |
| 6 | April 9 | @ Dodgers | 4 – 2 | Reuss (1–0) | Rainey (1-1) | Niedenfuer (1) | 33,284 | 3-3 | |
| 7 | April 11 | @ Dodgers | 2 – 1 | Honeycutt (1–0) | Sanderson (0–1) | | 38,466 | 3-4 | |
| 8 | April 13 | Mets | 11 – 2 | Trout (1-1) | Gooden (1-1) | | 33,436 | 4-4 | |
| 9 | April 14 | Mets | 5 – 2 | Ruthven (2–0) | Leary (1-1) | Smith (3) | 15,789 | 5-4 | |
| 10 | April 18 | Cardinals | 5 – 0 | Andújar (2–1) | Rainey (1–2) | | 0 | 5-5 | |
| 11 | April 18 | Cardinals | 6 – 1 | Sanderson (1-1) | LaPoint (1–2) | | 5,816 | 6-5 | |
| 12 | April 19 | Cardinals | 6 – 1 | Trout (2–1) | Cox (2–1) | | 8,086 | 7-5 | |
| 13 | April 20 | Pirates | 5 – 4 | Stoddard (1–0) | Tekulve (0–1) | | 22,049 | 8-5 | |
| 14 | April 21 | Pirates | 8 – 5 | DeLeon (1–0) | Noles (0–1) | Robinson (3) | 21,936 | 8-6 | |
| 15 | April 23 | @ Cardinals | 6 – 2 | Sanderson (2–1) | LaPoint (1–3) | | 12,468 | 9-6 | |
| 16 | April 24 | @ Cardinals | 3 – 2 | Stoddard (2–0) | Sutter (0–1) | Smith (4) | 19,639 | 10-6 | |
| 17 | April 25 | @ Cardinals | 7 – 5 | Lahti (1-1) | Ruthven (2–1) | Sutter (5) | 24,978 | 10-7 | |
| 18 | April 27 | @ Pirates | 3 – 2 | Rhoden (2-2) | Rainey (1–3) | Tekulve (2) | 9,057 | 10-8 | |
| 19 | April 28 | @ Pirates | 7 – 1 | Sanderson (3–1) | McWilliams (0–3) | | 17,317 | 11-8 | |
| 20 | April 29 | @ Pirates | 2 – 1 | Trout (3–1) | Candelaria (3–2) | Smith (5) | 13,397 | 12-8 | |

May (15-12)

| # | Date | Opponent | Score | Win | Loss | Save | Attendance | Record | Other Info |
|---|---|---|---|---|---|---|---|---|---|
| 21 | May 1 | @ Mets | 8 – 1 | Gooden (2–1) | Ruthven (2-2) | | 13,906 | 12-9 | |
| 22 | May 2 | @ Mets | 4 – 3 | Lynch (3–0) | Smith (1–2) | | 11,059 | 12-10 | |
| 23 | May 4 | Padres | 7 – 6 | Smith (2-2) | Monge (2–1) | | 6,533 | 13-10 | |
| 24 | May 5 | Padres | 6 – 5 | Brusstar (1–0) | Lefferts (0–1) | | 28,441 | 14-10 | |
| 25 | May 6 | Padres | 8 – 5 | Show (5–1) | Ruthven (2–3) | | 31,700 | 14-11 | |
| 26 | May 7 | Giants | 10 – 7 | Rainey (2–3) | M. Davis (0–4) | Stoddard (1) | 6,002 | 15-11 | |
| 27 | May 8 | Giants | 12 – 11 | Smith (3–2) | Minton (1–2) | | 4,645 | 16-11 | |
| 28 | May 9 | Dodgers | 7 – 0 | Sanderson (4–1) | Hooton (0–1) | Bordi (1) | 7,908 | 17-11 | |
| 29 | May 10 | Dodgers | 5 – 1 | Welch (3-3) | Trout (3–2) | | 15,747 | 17-12 | |
| 30 | May 11 | @ Astros | 3 – 1 | Ryan (3–2) | Ruthven (2–4) | DiPino (5) | 16,829 | 17-13 | |
| 31 | May 12 | @ Astros | 5 – 4 | Noles (1-1) | DiPino (1–2) | Smith (6) | 20,737 | 18-13 | |
| 32 | May 13 | @ Astros | 1 – 0 | Madden (1-1) | Reuschel (0–1) | Ruhle (2) | 13,405 | 18-14 | |
| 33 | May 15 | @ Reds | 6 – 3 | Noles (2–1) | Pastore (2–3) | Stoddard (2) | 13,074 | 19-14 | |
| 34 | May 16 | @ Reds | 10 – 4 | Trout (4–2) | Russell (2–4) | | 12,899 | 20-14 | |
| 35 | May 17 | @ Reds | 5 – 3 | Soto (6–1) | Ruthven (2–5) | | 18,974 | 20-15 | |
| 36 | May 18 | Astros | 7 – 6 | Stoddard (3–0) | Smith (0–1) | | 16,812 | 21-15 | |
| 37 | May 19 | Astros | 5 – 4 | Reuschel (1-1) | Dawley (2–3) | Smith (7) | 34,122 | 22-15 | |
| 38 | May 20 | Astros | 10 – 3 | Bordi (1–0) | M. Scott (2-2) | | 27,503 | 23-15 | |
| 39 | May 23 | Braves | 3 – 1 | Trout (5–2) | McMurtry (3–5) | Smith (8) | 15,860 | 24-15 | |
| 40 | May 24 | Braves | 10 – 7 | Rainey (3-3) | Perez (3–1) | Brusstar (1) | 0 | 25-15 | |
| 41 | May 24 | Braves | 7 – 5 | Reuschel (2–1) | Falcone (2–5) | Bordi (2) | 24,551 | 26-15 | |
| 42 | May 25 | Reds | 3 – 0 | Hume (3–4) | Noles (2-2) | Power (1) | 11,266 | 26-16 | |
| 43 | May 26 | Reds | 7 – 6 | Scherrer (1–0) | Trout (5–3) | Power (2) | 31,556 | 26-17 | |
| 44 | May 27 | Reds | 4 – 3 | Berenyi (2–5) | Eckersley (0–1) | | 38,060 | 26-18 | |
| 45 | May 29 | @ Braves | 7 – 4 | Perez (4–1) | Brusstar (1-1) | Forster (3) | 15,156 | 26-19 | |
| 46 | May 30 | @ Braves | 6 – 2 | Trout (6–3) | Barker (4–5) | Smith (9) | 16,660 | 27-19 | |
| 47 | May 31 | @ Phillies | 10 – 2 | Hudson (6–3) | Rainey (3–4) | | 25,044 | 27-20 | |

June (15-14)

| # | Date | Opponent | Score | Win | Loss | Save | Attendance | Record | Other Info |
|---|---|---|---|---|---|---|---|---|---|
| 49 | June 2 | @ Phillies | 3 – 2 | Holland (4–2) | Smith (3-3) | | 40,102 | 28-21 | |
| 50 | June 3 | @ Phillies | 11 – 2 | Trout (7–3) | K. Gross (1-1) | Brusstar (2) | 30,278 | 29-21 | |
| 51 | June 5 | @ Expos | 3 – 2 | Rainey (4-4) | Smith (5-5) | Smith (10) | 25,810 | 30-21 | |
| 52 | June 6 | @ Expos | 8 – 1 | Gullickson (2–5) | Reuschel (3–2) | | 15,686 | 30-22 | |
| 53 | June 7 | @ Expos | 2 – 1 | Lea (10–2) | Eckersley (0–2) | | 14,976 | 30-23 | |
| 54 | June 8 | @ Cardinals | 5 – 4 | Lahti (2–1) | Stoddard (3–1) | Sutter (14) | 38,457 | 30-24 | |
| 55 | June 9 | @ Cardinals | 5 – 0 | Bordi (2–0) | Stuper (2–3) | | 48,869 | 31-24 | |
| 56 | June 10 | @ Cardinals | 2 – 0 | Rainey (5–4) | Andújar (10–5) | Smith (11) | 43,035 | 32-24 | |
| 57 | June 11 | Expos | 2 – 1 | James (2–3) | Smith (3–4) | | 21,231 | 32-25 | |
| 58 | June 12 | Expos | 11 – 4 | Eckersley (1–2) | Lea (10–3) | | 22,512 | 33-25 | |
| 59 | June 13 | Expos | 7 – 4 | Stoddard (4–1) | Lucas (0–1) | Smith (12) | 22,388 | 34-25 | |
| 60 | June 14 | Phillies | 11 – 2 | Carlton (4–3) | Bordi (2–1) | | 23,373 | 34-26 | |
| 61 | June 15 | Phillies | 5 – 2 | Hudson (7–4) | Rainey (5-5) | Holland (14) | 27,489 | 34-27 | |
| 62 | June 16 | Phillies | 8 – 2 | Bystrom (3-3) | Reuschel (3-3) | | 40,723 | 34-28 | |
| 63 | June 17 | Phillies | 9 – 7 | K. Gross (3–2) | Eckersley (1–3) | Holland (15) | 36,882 | 34-29 | |
| 64 | June 19 | @ Pirates | 4 – 3 | Sutcliffe (1–0) | Tudor (4-4) | Smith (13) | 9,377 | 35-29 | |
| 65 | June 20 | @ Pirates | 5 – 1 | DeLeon (4-4) | Rainey (5–6) | | 7,767 | 35-30 | |
| 66 | June 21 | @ Pirates | 8 – 6 | Rhoden (5-5) | Eckersley (1–4) | Tekulve (6) | 8,267 | 35-31 | |
| 67 | June 22 | Cardinals | 9 – 3 | Reuschel (4–3) | Stuper (2–5) | Smith (14) | 33,723 | 36-31 | |
| 68 | June 23 | Cardinals | 12 – 11 | Smith (4-4) | Rucker (1-1) | | 38,079 | 37-31 | The Sandberg Game |
| 69 | June 24 | Cardinals | 5 – 0 | Sutcliffe (2–0) | Horton (3–1) | | 39,494 | 38-31 | |
| 70 | June 25 | Pirates | 3 – 0 | DeLeon (5–4) | Rainey (5–7) | | 19,036 | 38-32 | |
| 71 | June 26 | Pirates | 9 – 0 | Rhoden (6–5) | Eckersley (1–5) | | 0 | 38-33 | |
| 72 | June 26 | Pirates | 9 – 8 | Bordi (3–1) | McWilliams (4–6) | Smith (15) | 28,369 | 39-33 | |
| 73 | June 27 | Pirates | 8 – 7 | Stoddard (5–1) | Scurry (1–4) | | 37,055 | 40-33 | |
| 74 | June 28 | @ Dodgers | 5 – 3 | Trout (8–3) | Pena (8–4) | Stoddard (3) | 37,659 | 41-33 | |
| 75 | June 29 | @ Dodgers | 7 – 1 | Hershiser (3-3) | Sutcliffe (2–1) | | 43,700 | 41-34 | |
| 76 | June 30 | @ Dodgers | 14 – 4 | Frazier (1–0) | Howell (0–1) | Stoddard (4) | 47,991 | 42-34 | |

July (18-10)

| # | Date | Opponent | Score | Win | Loss | Save | Attendance | Record | Other Info |
|---|---|---|---|---|---|---|---|---|---|
| 77 | July 1 | @ Dodgers | 4 – 3 | Eckersley (2–5) | Valenzuela (8–9) | Brusstar (3) | 47,460 | 43-34 | |
| 78 | July 2 | @ Padres | 5 – 1 | Dravecky (5–4) | Reuschel (4-4) | | 13,444 | 43-35 | |
| 79 | July 3 | @ Padres | 3 – 2 | Trout (9–3) | Thurmond (5–4) | Stoddard (5) | 20,287 | 44-35 | |
| 80 | July 4 | @ Padres | 2 – 1 | Sutcliffe (3–1) | Show (8–6) | Smith (16) | 52,134 | 45-35 | |
| 81 | July 5 | @ Giants | 9 – 3 | Sanderson (5–1) | Laskey (4–8) | Bordi (3) | 6,854 | 46-35 | |
| 82 | July 6 | @ Giants | 5 – 4 | Stoddard (6–1) | Minton (1–6) | Smith (17) | 11,071 | 47-35 | |
| 83 | July 7 | @ Giants | 7 – 2 | Krukow (5–7) | Reuschel (4–5) | | 16,662 | 47-36 | |
| 84 | July 8 | @ Giants | 6 – 3 | Sutcliffe (4–1) | M. Davis (3–8) | Smith (18) | 22,223 | 48-36 | |
| 85 | July 12 | Dodgers | 3 – 2 | Stoddard (7–1) | Niedenfuer (1–5) | | 33,129 | 49-36 | |
| 86 | July 13 | Dodgers | 7 – 5 | Sutcliffe (5–1) | Welch (6–10) | Smith (19) | 33,915 | 50-36 | |
| 87 | July 14 | Dodgers | 8 – 0 | Hershiser (5–3) | Sanderson (5–2) | | 39,396 | 50-37 | |
| 88 | July 15 | Dodgers | 4 – 1 | Eckersley (3–5) | Valenzuela (8–10) | Smith (20) | 39,574 | 51-37 | |
| 89 | July 16 | Padres | 4 – 0 | Thurmond (6–5) | Ruthven (2–6) | | 23,642 | 51-38 | |
| 90 | July 17 | Padres | 6 – 5 | Show (10–6) | Trout (9–4) | Gossage (16) | 29,499 | 51-39 | |
| 91 | July 18 | Padres | 4 – 1 | Sutcliffe (6–1) | Whitson (10–5) | | 27,471 | 52-39 | |
| 92 | July 19 | Giants | 6 – 4 | Frazier (2–0) | M. Davis (3–10) | Stoddard (6) | 22,523 | 53-39 | |
| 93 | July 20 | Giants | 3 – 2 | Robinson (5–11) | Eckersley (3–6) | Minton (10) | 27,259 | 53-40 | |
| 94 | July 21 | Giants | 4 – 3 | Bordi (4–1) | Minton (1–7) | | 37,527 | 54-40 | |
| 95 | July 22 | Giants | 11 – 5 | Krukow (7–8) | Trout (9–5) | | 37,096 | 54-41 | |
| 96 | July 23 | @ Phillies | 3 – 2 | Sutcliffe (7–1) | Rawley (3–2) | Smith (21) | 32,243 | 55-41 | |
| 97 | July 24 | @ Phillies | 3 – 2 | Koosman (12–7) | Stoddard (7–2) | Holland (22) | 37,063 | 55-42 | |
| 98 | July 25 | @ Phillies | 9 – 4 | Eckersley (4–6) | Hudson (8-8) | | 45,183 | 56-42 | |
| 99 | July 27 | @ Mets | 2 – 1 | Gooden (9–6) | Ruthven (2–7) | Orosco (21) | 51,102 | 56-43 | |
| 100 | July 28 | @ Mets | 11 – 4 | Smith (5–4) | Sisk (1–3) | | 37,518 | 57-43 | |
| 101 | July 29 | @ Mets | 3 – 0 | Trout (10–5) | Terrell (8-8) | | 0 | 58-43 | |
| 102 | July 29 | @ Mets | 5 – 1 | Sanderson (6–2) | Berenyi (7–11) | | 50,443 | 59-43 | |
| 103 | July 30 | Phillies | 3 – 2 | Eckersley (5–6) | Hudson (8–9) | Smith (22) | 29,425 | 60-43 | |
| 104 | July 31 | Phillies | 2 – 1 (12) | Holland (5-5) | Stoddard (7–3) | Campbell (1) | 30,175 | 60-44 | |

August (20-10)

| # | Date | Opponent | Score | Win | Loss | Save | Attendance | Record | Other Info |
|---|---|---|---|---|---|---|---|---|---|
| 105 | August 1 | Phillies | 5 – 4 | Smith (6–4) | Holland (5–6) | | 32,900 | 61-44 | |
| 106 | August 2 | Expos | 3 – 2 | Sutcliffe (8–1) | Smith (9-9) | Smith (23) | 22,485 | 62-44 | |
| 107 | August 3 | Expos | 6 – 5 | Reardon (4-4) | Stoddard (7–4) | | 28,483 | 62-45 | |
| 108 | August 4 | Expos | 4 – 1 | Eckersley (6-6) | Schatzeder (4–3) | Frazier (1) | 38,306 | 63-45 | |
| 109 | August 5 | Expos | 4 – 3 | Reuschel (5-5) | Grapenthin (0–1) | Smith (24) | 35,142 | 64-45 | |
| 110 | August 6 | Mets | 9 – 3 | Ruthven (3–7) | Gooden (9–8) | | 31,793 | 65-45 | |
| 111 | August 7 | Mets | 8 – 6 | Sutcliffe (9–1) | Darling (10–5) | Frazier (2) | 0 | 66-45 | |
| 112 | August 7 | Mets | 8 – 4 | Stoddard (8–4) | Lynch (8–7) | Smith (25) | 39,271 | 67-45 | |
| 113 | August 8 | Mets | 7 – 6 | Smith (7–4) | Gardner (1-1) | Stoddard (7) | 37,292 | 68-45 | |
| 114 | August 9 | @ Expos | 1 – 0 | Schatzeder (5–3) | Frazier (2–1) | | 20,227 | 68-46 | |
| 115 | August 10 | @ Expos | 2 – 1 | James (5–4) | Stoddard (8–5) | | 21,566 | 68-47 | |
| 116 | August 11 | @ Expos | 2 – 1 | Smith (8–4) | Lea (14–8) | | 30,494 | 69-47 | |
| 117 | August 12 | @ Expos | 7 – 3 | Sutcliffe (10–1) | Rogers (3–12) | | 28,464 | 70-47 | |
| 118 | August 13 | @ Astros | 2 – 1 | Dawley (7–4) | Sanderson (6–3) | | 14,793 | 70-48 | |
| 119 | August 14 | @ Astros | 7 – 6 | Solano (1–2) | Frazier (2-2) | DiPino (10) | 18,756 | 70-49 | |
| 120 | August 15 | @ Astros | 6 – 2 | Knepper (12–8) | Eckersley (6–7) | DiPino (11) | 19,999 | 70-50 | |
| 121 | August 17 | @ Reds | 6 – 4 | Soto (13–6) | Ruthven (3–8) | | 35,038 | 70-51 | |
| 122 | August 18 | @ Reds | 13 – 11 | Sutcliffe (11–1) | Robinson (0–1) | Smith (26) | 32,256 | 71-51 | |
| 123 | August 19 | @ Reds | 9 – 6 | Frazier (3–2) | Russell (5–14) | | 38,404 | 72-51 | |
| 124 | August 20 | Astros | 6 – 1 | Trout (11–5) | Knepper (12–9) | | 26,967 | 73-51 | |
| 125 | August 21 | Astros | 11 – 5 | Eckersley (7-7) | M. Scott (5–11) | | 29,184 | 74-51 | |
| 126 | August 22 | Astros | 8 – 3 | Ryan (11–7) | Ruthven (3–9) | | 31,018 | 74-52 | |
| 127 | August 24 | Braves | 3 – 0 | Sutcliffe (12–1) | Camp (6-6) | | 35,496 | 75-52 | |
| 128 | August 25 | Braves | 3 – 2 | Mahler (9–8) | Sanderson (6–4) | | 36,614 | 75-53 | |
| 129 | August 26 | Braves | 5 – 0 | Trout (12–5) | Perez (11–6) | | 35,002 | 76-53 | |
| 130 | August 28 | Reds | 5 – 2 | Eckersley (8–7) | McGaffigan (3–6) | Frazier (3) | 0 | 77-53 | |
| 131 | August 28 | Reds | 5 – 2 | Ruthven (4–9) | Pastore (3–8) | Bordi (4) | 32,827 | 78-53 | |
| 132 | August 29 | Reds | 7 – 2 | Sutcliffe (13–1) | Russell (6–15) | | 26,425 | 79-53 | |
| 133 | August 30 | @ Braves | 8 – 3 | Smith (9–4) | Garber (2–4) | | 10,876 | 80-53 | |
| 134 | August 31 | @ Braves | 3 – 2 | Moore (3-3) | Smith (9–5) | | 19,396 | 80-54 | |

September (16-11)

| # | Date | Opponent | Score | Win | Loss | Save | Attendance | Record | Other Info |
|---|---|---|---|---|---|---|---|---|---|
| 135 | September 1 | @ Braves | 4 – 1 | Bordi (5–1) | McMurtry (8–14) | Smith (27) | 28,821 | 81-54 | |
| 136 | September 2 | @ Braves | 4 – 2 | Ruthven (5–9) | Mahler (9-9) | Smith (28) | 26,106 | 82-54 | |
| 137 | September 3 | @ Phillies | 4 – 3 (12) | Frazier (4–2) | Martin (1–2) | Smith (29) | 28,162 | 83-54 | |
| 138 | September 4 | @ Phillies | 7 – 2 | Sanderson (7–4) | Carlton (11–7) | | 25,054 | 84-54 | |
| 139 | September 5 | @ Expos | 3 – 1 | Palmer (6–3) | Trout (12–6) | Grapenthin (2) | 12,623 | 84-55 | |
| 140 | September 6 | @ Expos | 4 – 1 | Frazier (5–2) | Lea (15–10) | Smith (30) | 13,089 | 85-55 | |
| 141 | September 7 | @ Mets | 10 – 0 | Gooden (15–8) | Ruthven (5–10) | | 46,301 | 85-56 | |
| 142 | September 8 | @ Mets | 6 – 0 | Sutcliffe (14–1) | Terrell (10–11) | | 42,810 | 86-56 | |
| 143 | September 9 | @ Mets | 5 – 1 | Darling (12–6) | Frazier (5–3) | | 34,956 | 86-57 | |
| 144 | September 10 | Phillies | 3 – 2 | Stoddard (9–5) | Koosman (14–12) | Smith (31) | 26,083 | 87-57 | |
| 145 | September 11 | Phillies | 6 – 3 | Hudson (9–10) | Smith (9–6) | Holland (29) | 28,964 | 87-58 | |
| 146 | September 12 | Expos | 11 – 5 | Stoddard (10–5) | Smith (11–12) | | 20,976 | 88-58 | |
| 147 | September 14 | Mets | 7 – 1 | Sutcliffe (15–1) | Darling (12–7) | | 32,403 | 89-58 | |
| 148 | September 15 | Mets | 5 – 4 | Sanderson (8–4) | Fernandez (4–6) | Smith (32) | 38,653 | 90-58 | |
| 149 | September 16 | Mets | 9 – 3 | Berenyi (12–13) | Trout (12–7) | | 38,936 | 90-59 | |
| 150 | September 18 | Pirates | 6 – 2 | Tudor (10–11) | Eckersley (8-8) | Robinson (9) | 30,721 | 90-60 | |
| 151 | September 19 | Pirates | 11 – 6 | McWilliams (11–10) | Stoddard (10–6) | Winn (1) | 31,585 | 90-61 | |
| 152 | September 20 | Pirates | 7 – 6 | Tekulve (3–9) | Smith (9–7) | Candelaria (1) | 33,651 | 90-62 | |
| 153 | September 21 | @ Cardinals | 8 – 0 | Kepshire (5-5) | Sanderson (8–5) | | 36,847 | 90-63 | |
| 154 | September 23 | @ Cardinals | 8 – 1 | Trout (13–7) | Ownbey (0–3) | | 0 | 91-63 | |
| 155 | September 23 | @ Cardinals | 4 – 2 | Eckersley (9–8) | Andújar (19–14) | Smith (33) | 46,083 | 92-63 | |
| 156 | September 24 | @ Pirates | 4 – 1 | Sutcliffe (16–1) | McWilliams (11-11) | | 5,472 | 93-63 | Clinch NL East Title |
| 157 | September 25 | @ Pirates | 7 – 1 | DeLeon (7–13) | Patterson (0–1) | | 4,068 | 93-64 | |
| 158 | September 26 | @ Pirates | 5 – 2 | Ruthven (6–10) | Tunnell (1–7) | | 3,365 | 94-64 | |
| 159 | September 28 | Cardinals | 4 – 1 | Andújar (20–14) | Bordi (5–2) | Sutter (45) | 31,021 | 94-65 | |
| 160 | September 29 | Cardinals | 9 – 5 | Eckersley (10–8) | Cox (9–11) | | 33,954 | 95-65 | |
| 161 | September 30 | Cardinals | 2 – 1 | Frazier (6–3) | Sutter (5–7) | | 33,100 | 96-65 | |

== Player stats ==
=== Batting ===
==== Starters by position ====
Note: Pos = Position; G = Games played; AB = At bats; H = Hits; Avg. = Batting average; HR = Home runs; RBI = Runs batted in

| Pos | Player | G | AB | H | Avg. | HR | RBI |
|---|---|---|---|---|---|---|---|
| C | Jody Davis | 150 | 523 | 134 | .256 | 19 | 94 |
| 1B | Leon Durham | 137 | 473 | 132 | .279 | 23 | 96 |
| 2B | Ryne Sandberg | 156 | 636 | 200 | .314 | 19 | 84 |
| 3B | Ron Cey | 146 | 505 | 121 | .240 | 25 | 97 |
| SS | Larry Bowa | 133 | 391 | 87 | .223 | 0 | 17 |
| LF | Gary Matthews | 147 | 491 | 143 | .291 | 14 | 82 |
| CF | Bob Dernier | 143 | 536 | 149 | .278 | 3 | 32 |
| RF | Keith Moreland | 140 | 495 | 138 | .279 | 16 | 80 |

==== Other batters ====
Note: G = Games played; AB = At bats; H = Hits; Avg. = Batting average; HR = Home runs; RBI = Runs batted in

| Player | G | AB | H | Avg. | HR | RBI |
|---|---|---|---|---|---|---|
| Mel Hall | 48 | 150 | 42 | .280 | 4 | 22 |
| Henry Cotto | 105 | 146 | 40 | .274 | 0 | 8 |
| Gary Woods | 87 | 98 | 23 | .235 | 3 | 10 |
| Thad Bosley | 55 | 98 | 29 | .296 | 2 | 14 |
| Dave Owen | 47 | 93 | 18 | .194 | 1 | 10 |
| Richie Hebner | 44 | 81 | 27 | .333 | 2 | 8 |
| Tom Veryzer | 44 | 74 | 14 | .189 | 0 | 4 |
| Jay Johnstone | 52 | 73 | 21 | .288 | 0 | 3 |
| Steve Lake | 25 | 54 | 12 | .222 | 2 | 7 |
| Bill Buckner | 21 | 43 | 9 | .209 | 0 | 2 |
| Ron Hassey | 19 | 33 | 11 | .333 | 2 | 5 |
| Dan Rohn | 25 | 31 | 4 | .129 | 1 | 3 |
| Davey Lopes | 16 | 17 | 4 | .235 | 0 | 0 |
| Billy Hatcher | 8 | 9 | 1 | .111 | 0 | 0 |

=== Pitching ===
==== Starting pitchers ====
Note: G = Games pitched; IP = Innings pitched; W = Wins; L = Losses; ERA = Earned run average; SO = Strikeouts

| Player | G | IP | W | L | ERA | SO |
|---|---|---|---|---|---|---|
| Steve Trout | 32 | 190.0 | 13 | 7 | 3.41 | 81 |
| Dennis Eckersley | 24 | 160.1 | 10 | 8 | 3.03 | 81 |
| Rick Sutcliffe | 20 | 150.1 | 16 | 1 | 2.69 | 155 |
| Scott Sanderson | 24 | 140.2 | 8 | 5 | 3.14 | 76 |
| Dick Ruthven | 23 | 126.2 | 6 | 10 | 5.04 | 55 |
| Chuck Rainey | 17 | 88.1 | 5 | 7 | 4.28 | 45 |
| Don Schulze | 1 | 3.0 | 0 | 0 | 12.00 | 2 |

==== Other pitchers ====
Note: G = Games pitched; IP = Innings pitched; W = Wins; L = Losses; ERA = Earned run average; SO = Strikeouts

| Player | G | IP | W | L | ERA | SO |
|---|---|---|---|---|---|---|
| Rick Reuschel | 19 | 92.1 | 5 | 5 | 5.17 | 43 |
| Rich Bordi | 31 | 83.1 | 5 | 2 | 3.46 | 41 |
| Reggie Patterson | 3 | 6.0 | 0 | 1 | 10.50 | 5 |

==== Relief pitchers ====
Note: G = Games pitched; W = Wins; L = Losses; SV = Saves; ERA = Earned run average; SO = Strikeouts

| Player | G | W | L | SV | ERA | SO |
|---|---|---|---|---|---|---|
| Lee Smith | 69 | 9 | 7 | 33 | 3.65 | 86 |
| Tim Stoddard | 58 | 10 | 6 | 7 | 3.82 | 87 |
| Warren Brusstar | 41 | 1 | 1 | 3 | 3.11 | 36 |
| George Frazier | 37 | 6 | 3 | 3 | 4.10 | 58 |
| Dickie Noles | 21 | 2 | 2 | 0 | 5.15 | 14 |
| Porfi Altamirano | 5 | 0 | 0 | 0 | 4.76 | 7 |
| Bill Johnson | 4 | 0 | 0 | 0 | 1.69 | 3 |
| Ron Meridith | 3 | 0 | 0 | 0 | 3.38 | 4 |

== Cultural Influences ==
Before the season began, Grammy Award winning artist Steve Goodman recorded the tune "Go Cubs Go" which was played as the lead-in music for the radio broadcast on WGN radio. Goodman, who died just days before the Cubs clinched the division, also recorded "A Dying Cubs Fan's Last Request". Since the 2007 season, the song has been played at Wrigley Field after victories; the practice continues to this day.

The home games always began with the popular Van Halen song "Jump".

== NLCS ==
A theory is that the Cubs were deprived of home-field advantage for the 1984 National League Championship Series (NLCS) because they could not host night games. There are accounts of MLB executives becoming frustrated throughout the 1984 MLB season and when it started to become clear in mid-August that the Cubs were very likely going to win the division, TV money was at stake. The networks then covering postseason games — NBC and ABC — could have lost millions if they had to cover those games at the then-lightless Wrigley Field on weekday afternoons. This was considered by MLB moguls to be important for the World Series and ultimately leads some to believe there may have been collusion leading to the Cubs losing three straight games to the San Diego Padres.

However, from 1969 to 1984, the LCS were five-game series played in a 2-3 format. The NL West and AL East champs hosted the first two games in odd years and the NL East and the AL West hosted the first two games in even years. Thus, no changes were made to the NLCS schedule due to Wrigley Field's lack of lights.

It is true that Major League Baseball announced in August 1984 that if the Cubs were to make the World Series, the first game would be moved to the American League park, to maximize the television revenues from night games. In 1984, the series was to be a seven-game series in a 2-3-2 format with the NL hosting the first two and last two games. San Diego won the series, 3–2.

| Game | Date | Score | Location | Time | Attendance |
|---|---|---|---|---|---|
| 1 | October 2 | San Diego Padres – 0, Chicago Cubs – 13 | Wrigley Field | 2:49 | 36,282 |
| 2 | October 3 | San Diego Padres – 2, Chicago Cubs – 4 | Wrigley Field | 2:18 | 36,282 |
| 3 | October 4 | Chicago Cubs – 1, San Diego Padres – 7 | Jack Murphy Stadium | 2:19 | 58,346 |
| 4 | October 6 | Chicago Cubs – 5, San Diego Padres – 7 | Jack Murphy Stadium | 3:13 | 58,354 |
| 5 | October 7 | Chicago Cubs – 3, San Diego Padres – 6 | Jack Murphy Stadium | 2:41 | 58,359 |

== Awards and honors ==
- Jim Frey, Associated Press Manager of the Year
- Ryne Sandberg – National League Most Valuable Player
- Rick Sutcliffe – National League Cy Young Award Winner

All-Star Game

- Ryne Sandberg, second baseman (starter)
- Jody Davis, catcher (reserve)

== Farm system ==
| Level | Team | League | Manager |
|---|---|---|---|
| AAA | Iowa Cubs | American Association | Jim Napier |
| AA | Midland Cubs | Texas League | George Enright |
| A | Lodi Crushers | California League | Junior Kennedy |
| A | Quad Cities Cubs | Midwest League | Larry Cox |
| A-Short Season | Geneva Cubs | New York–Penn League | Tony Franklin |
| Rookie | Pikeville Cubs | Appalachian League | Jim Fairey |

== External sources ==
- 1984 Chicago Cubs stats at Baseball Reference
- 1984 Batting and Pitching Statistics
