= List of events at Wrigley Field =

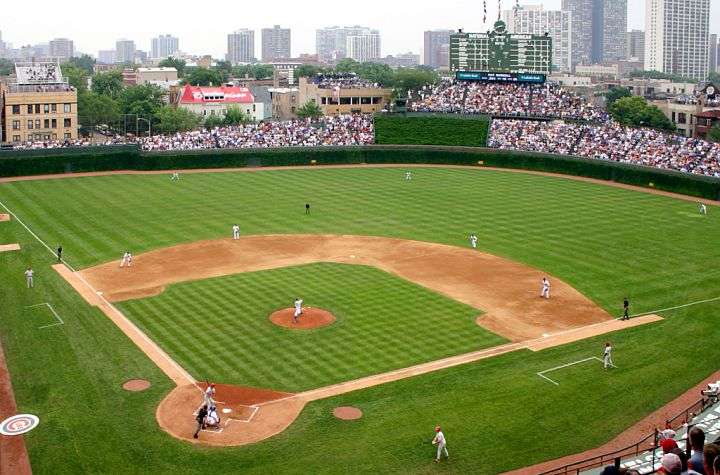
View of the field from the upper deck, 2004

Wrigley Field is a stadium that opened in 1914. It has primarily served as the home field of the Chicago Cubs professional baseball club for over nine decades, but it also hosted football games and other events in its 100 years of existence.

== 1910s ==
=== 1914 ===
- April 23 the Federal League Chifeds played the first game at the brand-new Weeghman Park. After parades and ceremonies, the Chifeds defeated the visiting Kansas City Packers 9–1.

=== 1915 ===
- In June and July, on select night the park hosted first-class "hippodrome acts" at night after the Whales' games. Separate admission fee (of between 10 and 20 cents for grandstand and 30 for boxes) was charged to view circus-style performers such as "The Five Juggling Normans", "The Clown of the Sawdust Ring" and "the great baseball pantomime comedian George Silvers"
- October 3 the renamed Chicago Whales clinched what would turn out to be the final Federal League pennant in perhaps the closest pennant race in history. Going into the last day of the season, Chicago was four points ahead of the Pittsburgh Rebels and five points ahead of the St. Louis Terriers. St. Louis won its game against Kansas City, putting them just two points behind Chicago and two ahead of Pittsburgh. The Whales were scheduled to play a doubleheader against Pittsburgh at Weeghman Park. The Whales lost the first game, 5–4, in the 11th inning after having led 4–1 with two outs in the ninth inning. A loss or tie in the second game would give Pittsburgh the FL pennant, while a win would give the Whales the pennant. As the sun drew low during the second game, the game remained scoreless. Finally, in the sixth inning, the Whales scored three runs, two of them from a Max Flack double. The game was called due to darkness after Pittsburgh failed to score in the top of the seventh inning. The Whales ended up winners of the pennant by .001 over St. Louis, and Pittsburgh ended up third, one-half game back.

=== 1916 ===
- April 20 the Cubs played their first game in Weeghman Park. The franchise had merged with the Whales after the 1915 season, and as a result acquired the park and made it their own. The Cubs beat the Cincinnati Reds 7–6 in 11 innings.

=== 1917 ===
- May 2 Jim "Hippo" Vaughn and the Cincinnati Reds's Fred Toney both pitched nine-inning no-hitters before Jim Thorpe drives in a run in the 10th inning for a Reds victory.

=== 1918 ===
- August 29, with the season ending early due to war restrictions, the Chicago Cubs clinched the National League pennant with a 1–0 win over the Cincinnati Reds at Weeghman Park. The Cubs would play their home games of that year's World Series in Comiskey Park, home of the Chicago White Sox. Weeghman Park would not see its first World Series game until 1929, when it had become known as Wrigley Field.

=== 1919 ===
- September 21 Grover Cleveland Alexander pitched a complete game, defeating the Boston Braves 3–0 in a 58-minute game. This is fastest nine-inning game in Cubs franchise history.

== 1920s ==
=== 1920 ===
- June 26, 1920: In a high-school "inter-state championship" game between New York City's Commerce High and Chicago's Lane Tech, just-turned-17 New York player Lou Gehrig slugs a grand slam to lead his team to a comeback victory.
- October 10, 1920: First professional football game at Cubs Park. The Chicago Tigers hosted the Racine Cardinals in a 0–0 draw. The game was attended by a crowd of 8,000.
- 1920 American Professional Football League Championship Game

=== 1921 ===
- 1921 The Chicago Staleys (now known as the 'Chicago Bears') make Cubs Park their home venue.

=== 1922 ===
- July 12, 1922: Cubs Park hosts its first concert. Lights were brought in to illuminate the field, and a platform and sound board was set up over the infield for an orchestra performance.
- August 25, 1922: The Cubs defeat the Philadelphia Phillies 26–23 in what remains (through 2009) the highest-scoring game in major league history (49 runs total). After spotting the Phillies an early 2–1 lead, the Cubs score 10 in the second and 14 in the fourth, leading 25–6 at that point. The Phillies outscore the Cubs 17–1 during the last five innings, but the Cubs hang on to win in the ninth (with the potential lead run at the plate), avoiding what would have been the most lopsided comeback in history (the Phillies will save that effort for a game here in 1976). The winds apparently shift the next day, as the Cubs lose to the Phils 3–0.

=== 1923 ===
- In 1923 the park hosted the annual rivalry game between the Illinois and Northwestern college football teams. This was the first time the game had ever been played in Chicago.

=== 1924 ===
- October 1, 1924: WGN broadcasts its first baseball game from the park, the first Chicago professional game ever broadcast on radio, with A.W. Kaney commentating. The Cubs were hosting the White Sox, and won 10–7. The Chicago Cubs arguably led the way among MLB teams when it came to adopting the medium of radio broadcasting. Many major-league owners in the 1920s had been reluctant to adopting radio (fearing that fans tuning into games would quit attending at their ballparks), while William Wrigley Jr. correctly believed that radio would actually bring in more spectators excited from what they heard on the radio. "The more outlets, the better." he told players. "That way we'll tie up the entire city." By the mid-1920s five different stations were transmitting home games from Wrigley Field. During the 1931 season as many as 7 Chicago radio stations carried Cubs from Wrigley Field, as the team charged no broadcast fee.

=== 1926 ===
- December 3, 1926: Board of Directors votes to officially rename the park "Wrigley Field" in honor of William Wrigley Jr. It was the second ballpark with this name, as Wrigley's minor league team, the Los Angeles Angels, also played at a Wrigley Field.

=== 1927 ===
- April 12, 1927: Cubs beat the St. Louis Cardinals 10–1 before 42,000 attendees for the first game in the newly renamed 'Wrigley Field'
- May 31, 1927: Wrigley Field hosts the junior welterweight boxing championship. Mushy Callahan defeated Spug Meyers for the title.

=== 1929 ===
- September 1929: Doubleheader sets a single-day record with 81,000 in attendance.
- September 18, 1929: The Cubs clinch the National League pennant, losing their game, but the second place team also loses and is eliminated on the same day.
- Oct. 8, 1929: Wrigley Field hosts its first World Series game between the Cubs and Philadelphia Athletics. Temporary bleachers were constructed above Waveland and Sheffield to host the nearly 51,000 spectators in attendance.

== 1930s ==
=== 1930 ===
- June 28, 1930: Cubs draw a record 51,556 fans for their game hosting Brooklyn.
- September 28, 1930: Hall of Famer Hack Wilson sets an MLB record with his 190th and 191st runs of the season. His RBI record stands to this day.

=== 1931 ===
- June 21, 1931: Glasgow Celtic, one of the most celebrated European soccer clubs, beat the Bricklayers, a Chicago-area team, 6-3 before 11,000 spectators at Wrigley Field.
- Fall of 1931: Chicago Cardinals move from Comiskey Park to Wrigley Field. The Chicago Cardinals and Chicago Bears football teams shared Wrigley until the Cardinals left after 1939.

=== 1932 ===
- September 20, 1932: The Cubs clinch the pennant, defeating the Pittsburgh Pirates 5–2.
- October 1, 1932: Babe Ruth of the New York Yankees hits his famous "called shot" in the 5th inning of Game 3 of the World Series.

=== 1933 ===
- December 17, 1933: The Chicago Bears win the first-ever NFL East-vs.-West Championship Game, over the New York Giants, 23–21. There were 26,000 spectators in attendance.

=== 1934 ===
- September 20, 1934: The world heavyweight wrestling title bout was decided in a ring built above home plate. Jim Landos pinned Ed Lewis to win the title. There was also a wrestling exhibition between Gorgeous George and Jim McMillen

=== 1935 ===
- September 1935: From September 4 through September 28 the Chicago Cubs have a 21-game winning streak (tied for the second longest in MLB history, and the longest excluding ties). The majority of the games in this winning streak were at Wrigley.

=== 1937 ===
- December 12, 1937: The Washington Redskins defeat the Chicago Bears at Wrigley, 28–21 in the NFL championship game. There were 15,878 in attendance.

=== 1938 ===
- 1938: A tradition began when pennants representing league standings were hung beneath the yardarm of Wrigley Field's scoreboard. Also, Wrigley became the first stadium in the MLB to add a scoreboard outside the ballpark so that fans passing outside could be aware of the game's progress.
- September 28, 1938: Gabby Hartnett hits the "Homer in the Gloamin'" to lift the Cubs past in the standings, and deal a fatal blow to, the Pittsburgh Pirates, who had led the National League for much of the summer. The Cubs' actual pennant clinching comes in St. Louis three days later.

== 1940s ==
=== 1941 ===
- December 8, 1941: The day following the Attack on Pearl Harbor, owner P.K. Wrigley donates 165 tons of steel that had been intended for the construction of lights at Wrigley Field to the U.S. war effort. The Chicago Cubs would not host a night game until 8/8/1988.
- December 21, 1941: Two weeks after Pearl Harbor, the Bears win the NFL Championship Game, over the New York Giants, 37–9.
- April 26, 1941: Cubs become the first team to have an organ play inside their ballpark.

=== 1943 ===
- January 1943: For two consecutive weekends, Wrigley Field hosts Norge Ski Club's 38th annual invitational ski jump tournament. A scaffold ski jump was assembled and coated with ice and snow. Skiers began their descent near where the broadcast booth is located today, and landed behind second base.
- May 1943: Baseball tryouts for the All-American Girls Professional Baseball League were held at Wrigley Field. The League invited 280 women to final tryouts on Chicago's Wrigley Field on May 17, 1943, where "60 were chosen to become the first women to ever play baseball" This league was the basis of the feature film "A League of Their Own".
- June 25, 1943: The first 'night' game in Wrigley Field history. This Friday evening game against the first place St. Louis Cardinals started at 6 PM (which is considered a twi-night game by MLB standards today). The game ended 2 hours 17 minutes later (some minutes before sundown), on one of the longest days of the years.
- August 8, 1943 Lee Savold defeated Lou Nova in a boxing match at Wrigley Field.
- December 26, 1943: The Bears win the NFL Championship Game, over the Washington Redskins, 41–21.

=== 1944 ===
- August 7, 1944 Joe Baksi defeated Lee Savold in a boxing match at Wrigley Field.

=== 1945 ===
- October 6, 1945: The most commonly accepted date of the (possibly apocryphal) Curse of the Billy Goat incident.
- 1945 World Series

=== 1946 ===
- June 1946: For 5 afternoons and evenings Wrigley hosted a rodeo and thrill circus including some of the world's best riders. There were over 900 that participated in riding bulls and broncos and rope tricks and stunts.

=== 1947 ===
- July 8, 1947: 1947 MLB All-Star Game. A.L. 2, N.L. 1.
- 1947: First year that all Cubs home games were televised. WBKB broadcast every Cubs home game from Wrigley that year.

=== 1947 ===
- May 18, 1947: Most attended regular-season game in Wrigley Field's history (46,572), largely to see Jackie Robinson play his first game in Chicago for the visiting Dodgers.

=== 1948 ===
- May 31, 1948: The Cubs set a paid attendance record when 46‚965 pass through the turnstiles for a doubleheader with the Pirates. The Cubs take the opener‚ 4–3 behind reliever Bob Rush‚ then drop the nitecap‚ 4–2 to Elmer Riddle. Andy Pafko is the hitting star‚ pounding out five hits‚ including a homer in each game.

== 1950s ==
=== 1951 ===
- April 17, 1951: Professional golfer Sam Snead hit a ball over the center-field scoreboard. He's the only person to do this, even if he did it by driving a golf ball rather than hitting a baseball.

=== 1953 ===
- April 22, 1953: Spearheading a blowout win over Chicago, the Braves' Eddie Mathews hits his second home run of the game, a 500-foot, 4th-inning moonshot onto Sheffield Avenue, later recognized as one of three batted balls in Wrigley Field's history to come close to hitting its distant, slightly-right-of-center scoreboard (the others being Bill Nicholson's similarly Sheffield-bound blast in 1942 plus one hit to the left of the scoreboard—and thus landing near the corner of Waveland and Sheffield—by Pittsburgh's Roberto Clemente in 1959).

=== 1954 ===
- August 21, 1954: Under portable lights and in front of a crowd of over 14,000, the Harlem Globetrotters defeat George Mikan's U.S. All-Stars by a score of 57–51. Also featured were the House of David travelling team against the Boston Whirlwinds.

=== 1955 ===
- May 12, 1955: Sam Jones pitches a 4–0 no-hitter over the Pittsburgh Pirates, the hard way: he walks the bases full in the 9th inning, and then strikes out the side.

=== 1958 ===
- May 13, 1958: Stan "The Man" Musial of the St. Louis Cardinals achieves his 3000th career hit, in a pinch-hitting role. This deprives Cardinals fans of the chance to see him reach this milestone at home, but Harry Caray's ecstatic voice describes the action for listeners of the Cardinals radio network – Caray's future status as a Cubs icon unsuspected by anyone.

=== 1959 ===
- May 17, 1959: Though it won't prevent the Cubs from salvaging a split in today's twin bill vs. Pittsburgh, Roberto Clemente's 9th-inning, bases-empty, 520-plus-foot blast instantly makes Wrigley Field history—the first ever to clear the diagonal fence behind the center field bleachers, just to the left of the 1937-vintage hand-operated scoreboard. And though its prodigious nature will be all but forgotten over time, reduced to becoming one part of the answer to a scoreboard-related trivia question, several distinguished Wrigley Field regulars are on hand to bear witness to this blast's longest-HR status: manager Bob Scheffing, slugger Ernie Banks and batting coach Rogers Hornsby, as well as broadcaster Jack Brickhouse, who also calls this the hardest hit ball he's ever seen that was unaided by wind.
- June 30, 1959, in one of the wackier moments in baseball history, an umpire's mistake results in two baseballs being in play at the same time. The visiting St. Louis Cardinals file a protest, but withdraw the protest after winning the game. Thus the two-baseball play is allowed to stand.
- August 28-September 7, 1959 Wrigley Field hosted the baseball component of the 1959 Pan American Games.

== 1960s ==
=== 1960 ===
- May 15, 1960 Don Cardwell, making his debut with the Cubs following a trade, pitched a 4-0 no-hitter over the St. Louis Cardinals. With 2 outs in the 9th and two strikes on him, the Cards' Joe Cunningham nearly broke it up with a line drive to left field, but Moose Moryn made a running, shoetop catch for the final out.

=== 1961 ===
- May 28, 1961 a literal case of a "fireman" garnering a "save" for the Cubs occurred. During a contest with the San Francisco Giants, a hot dog stand near the right field corner caught fire, and Wrigleyville's Fire Engine House #78 (built in 1915) is called in from its "bullpen" across Waveland to extinguish the blaze.

=== 1962 ===
- July 23, 1962 Wrigley Field 'went international', as Telstar transmitted images from the Phillies-Cubs game (patched into the WGN-TV coverage) to overseas receiving stations.
- July 30, 1962 the second 1962 Major League Baseball All-Star Game (two were played each year 1959–1962) was played at Wrigley Field. Americans 9, Nationals 4. The last time the center field bleachers are open to fans, in the park's baseball configuration.

=== 1963 ===
- December 29, 1963: The Bears win the NFL Championship over the New York Giants, 14-10, on a bright, clear and frigid Sunday afternoon (it was 9 °F (−13 °C) at kickoff).

=== 1965 ===
- December 12, 1965: Gale Sayers of the Bears runs for a record-tying six touchdowns, as the Bears rout the San Francisco 49ers 61–20.

=== 1966 ===
- September 21, 1966: A paid attendance of only 530 fans, the smallest crowd in the history of Wrigley Field, watches the Cubs defeat the Cincinnati Reds 9–3 on a Wednesday afternoon, near the end of a season that saw the Cubs lose 103 games and finish in 10th place.

=== 1967 ===
- February, 1967: Cubs announce they will feature music and play the national anthem before every home game. Prior to this, the national anthem only was played for holidays and special occasions at Wrigley field.
- July 2, 1967: Cubs defeat the Cincinnati Reds 4–1, and move into first place. This was the first time since 1945 that the Cubs were in first place this far into the season.

=== 1969 ===
- June 29, 1969: The Cubs held a "Day" for Billy Williams at Wrigley, in a doubleheader against the Cardinals before 41,060 fans, some dressed in red and some in blue. In a happy scheduling coincidence, Williams tied and passed Cardinals icon Stan Musial for the National League consecutive games record (895 and 896). Williams contributes 5 hits as the Cubs edge out the Cardinals in the opener, 3–1, and then thump the Redbirds in the late-afternoon-cap, 12–1.
- August 19, 1969 Ken Holtzman, aided by a strong northerly wind, no-hit the powerful-hitting Atlanta Braves, 3–0, in what proved to be the high-water mark of the ill-fated 1969 season. In the 7th inning, Henry Aaron socked one that appeared to be headed for Waveland Avenue, but the wind smacked it down and into the glove of the leaping Billy Williams. Aaron also made the final out, a ground ball from Beckert to Banks. The attendance of this game was 37,514.

== 1970s ==
=== 1970 ===
- May 12, 1970 Ernie Banks hit his 500th career home run against Pat Jarvis of the Atlanta Braves.
- December 13, 1970 the Chicago Bears held their final game at Wrigley Field, beating their rival Green Bay Packers 35–17.

=== 1972 ===
- April 16, 1972 Burt Hooton pitched a no-hitter 4–0 win over the Phillies. This was his fourth career start, and he was the first NL rookie in 60 years to throw a no-hitter. The season had started late due to a players' strike, and this one came on the second day of the season.
- September 2, 1972 Milt Pappas pitched a no-hitter 8–0 win over the San Diego Padres. He came within one strike of a perfect game, but walked a batter. The pitch called as a ball was highly controversial. Milt Pappas and many Cubs fans alike believe the pitch was a strike, not a ball. Pappas, after this, retired the final batter. After a relative rash of Wrigley and Cubs no-hitters, this was the last by a Cub until Carlos Zambrano did so against the Astros, in a game held at Milwaukee due to Hurricane Ike.

=== 1976 ===
- April 14, 1976: Dave Kingman of the New York Mets hit what, more than 40 years after the fact, would remain one of the three or four longest documented home runs in Wrigley Field's history (another of which—a near-carbon-copy of this blast launched on May 17, 1979—was also Kong's handiwork). Carrying far beyond Waveland Avenue, the ball traveled more than 520 feet before striking a window pane several houses in on Kenmore Avenue.
- April 17, 1976, with a strong prevailing southerly breeze, the Cubs took a 13-2 lead over the Phillies through 4 innings, only to finally lose 18–16 in 10 innings, as the Phillies tied the NL record for the largest lead overcome. Tied at 15–15, the Phillies scored three in the 10th, partly on the strength of Mike Schmidt's 4th home run of the game, and the Cubs were only able to come back with one in their half of the 10th. This allowed the Phillies to tie the National League record for largest deficit overcome (11 runs).

=== 1977 ===
- July 28, 1977 Cubs and Cincinnati Reds tied the NL record for most home runs in a single game (11). The Cubs beat the Reds 16–15 in the 13-inning game.

=== 1979 ===
- May 17, 1979, in another windblown game with the Phillies (echoing the high-scoring Cubs-Phillies games of 1922 and 1976), the Phillies took a large lead only to have the Cubs catch them in the late innings. However, like 1976, Mike Schmidt did the Cubs in again, hitting a homer (his second of the day) in the 10th (off Bruce Sutter) to give the Phillies a 23–22 win. Dave Kingman hit three homers that day in a losing cause. In a curious mix of nostalgia and masochism, the following winter WGN-TV will replay the entire game videotape, as a "snow day" special.

== 1980s ==
=== 1981 ===
- June 16 the Tribune Company announced their purchase of the Chicago Cubs and Wrigley Field.
- June 28 the Chicago Sting of the North American Soccer League defeated the New York Cosmos 6-5 in front of 30,501 attendees. With the Cubs having a poor season. This was the second highest attendance at Wrigley that year behind the Cubs home opener.

=== 1982 ===
- August 18 the Cubs lost to the Los Angeles Dodgers 2–1 in a 21-inning contest, the longest game ever played at Wrigley Field and in Cubs history (by time). The game had been suspended due to darkness at the end of the 17th inning the previous afternoon. The game lasted six hours and ten minutes. Dusty Baker drove in the winning run on a sacrifice fly in the top of the 21st.
- August 22 Ernie Banks' number 14 was retired by the Cubs at Wrigley Field.

=== 1983 ===
- April 29, following a loss to the Los Angeles Dodgers, Cubs manager Lee Elia unleashed a profanity-laced verbal tirade against Cub fans, suggesting they were unemployed losers (in 1983, home games were still played exclusively during the day, when many individuals would be at their day jobs). At the time the Cubs were 5–14 on the season, and the team was the subject of frequent booing and heckling. Elia was fired in August, partly due to the bad blood resulting from his comments.
- June 10 Ferguson Jenkins pitched a four-hit complete game shutout against the reigning World Champion St. Louis Cardinals. This game, which was Jenkins' 281st career win, was witnessed by 37,024 fans—which was the largest crowd at Wrigley in nearly two years. The game would turn out to be the last hurrah for the 39-year-old pitcher. Toward the end of the season, Jenkins was demoted to a relief pitching role, and was released the following spring with 284 lifetime victories.
- August 24 Cubs pitcher Chuck Rainey came within one out of pitching a no-hitter against the Cincinnati Reds. The Reds' Eddie Milner singled with two outs in the ninth inning to break up Rainey's gem. Rainey wound up with a one-hit victory over the Reds, 3–0.

=== 1984 ===
- June 23 "The Sandberg Game" took place. This game was a nationally televised Saturday game against the Cardinals that put Ryne Sandberg on the map, and came to symbolize the season for the Cubs, who would go on to win their first title of any kind since 1945. The Cubs overcame deficits of 7–1, 9–3, and 11–9 as Sandberg hit a pair of game-tying home runs in late-inning action, both off ex-Cubs ace Bruce Sutter, a wild one eventually won by the Cubs 12–11 in 11 innings. ESPN replayed significant portions of the game prior to Sandberg's Hall of Fame induction in 2005, which show Sutter turning and shouting "Damn!" to himself when Sandberg hit the second one. However, Sutter later credited that replaying with helping him achieve his own Hall of Fame election the following year.
- August 7, with the Cubs en route to a four-sweep over the Mets in an intense playoff race, Cubs player Keith Moreland rushed the mound and roll-blocked Mets pitcher Ed Lynch, causing a notable Bench-clearing brawl.
- October 2, the Cubs clobbered the San Diego Padres 13–0 in the first game of the National League Championship Series. It was the Cubs' first postseason appearance since 1945. The Cubs combined for five home runs, including one by pitcher Rick Sutcliffe.

=== 1985 ===
- September 8 Pete Rose of the Cincinnati Reds collected his 4,190th and 4,191st career hits in the first and fifth innings respectively. Rose had a chance at his 4,192 in the top of the ninth, but with dark clouds closing in, fireballing reliever Lee Smith struck Rose out. The game was later called on account of darkness after another half-inning as a tie. At the time, Rose's fifth-inning hit was believed to have tied Ty Cobb's career record (WGN-TV flashed "Tied with Ty" on-screen), and 4,191 is still recognized by Major League Baseball as Cobb's official hit total. Independent researchers now believe Cobb's hit total to be 4,189, which if true would mean that Rose actually broke the record in the first inning. Rose was only in the lineup due to a last-minute pitching change. Rose normally batted only against right-handers. With lefty Steve Trout on the mound, Rose was due to be on the bench, and likely to tie and break Cobb's record in an upcoming 10-game homestand. But Trout's left arm had been injured in a fall while bicycling with his family the previous evening, and right-hander Reggie Patterson was announced as the starter. Rose, favoring the platoon advantage over breaking the record at home, inserted himself in the lineup for the game and made history.

=== 1987 ===
- In 1987 Wrigley Field is placed on the National Register of Historic Places
- July 8 San Diego Padres pitcher Eric Show hit Chicago slugger Andre Dawson in the face with a pitch. Following this beaning, Dawson remained motionless on the ground for several moments, then jumped to his feet and charged the mound as part of a bench-clearing brawl.
- August 13, 1987 Billy Williams' number 26 was retired.
- August 27, 1987, entering the 8th inning with an 8–6 lead over the Atlanta Braves in the second game of a doubleheader, darkness set in at Wrigley and the game was called, resulting in a Cubs victory. This was a routine occurrence in the pre-light years. The installation of lights the following season makes such suspensions less likely to occur in the future.

=== 1988 ===
- June 28, 1988 over 1.5 million phone calls were recorded during a 3½-hour ticket lottery for the final 13,000 tickets to the first scheduled night game on 8/8/88.
- August 8, 1988 the Cubs played their first game under the newly installed lights at Wrigley Field. Rain forced the postponement of the game in the fourth inning, with the Cubs leading the Philadelphia Phillies, 3–1. When the Phillies returned to Wrigley four weeks later, the Cubs would lose 4-3 in the replay of the game, which was the major league debut of pitcher Mike Harkey.
- August 9 the Chicago Cubs hosted the New York Mets in the first official night game at Wrigley Field. The Cubs beat the Mets 6–4.

=== 1989 ===
- October 4 the Cubs lost 11–3 to the San Francisco Giants in Game 1 of the 1989 National League Championship Series, the first postseason night game at Wrigley.

== 1990s ==
=== 1990 ===
- July 10 Wrigley Field hosted the 1990 All-Star Game. The American League beat the National League 2–0 in a rain-soaked game.

=== 1993 ===
- July 7, in one of baseball's most legendary pranks, Tom Browning of the Cincinnati Reds snuck out of Wrigley Field during a game and appeared on a Wrigley Field rooftop, 3643 N. Sheffield Ave. in uniform. The gag earned Browning a $500 fine from Reds manager Davey Johnson.

=== 1994 ===
- On Opening Day 1994 Karl "Tuffy" Rhodes hit home runs in three consecutive at-bats becoming the second player in MLB history to hit three home runs on Opening Day.
- April 13 Michael Jordan made his Chicago baseball debut playing for the Chicago White Sox in the 'Windy City Classic'.

=== 1998 ===
- May 6 Kerry Wood of the Chicago Cubs struck-out twenty Houston Astros players to set the National League record and tie the major league record for strikeouts in a nine-inning game. The Cubs won 2–0 as Wood gave up only one hit. Wood was in his rookie season, and this was just his fifth major-league start. Wood also twice hit 100 mph on the radar gun in the game.
- September 13 Sammy Sosa hit his 61st and 62nd home runs of the season to pass Babe Ruth and Roger Maris, and temporarily tie Mark McGwire, for the all-time single-season home run record. McGwire would eventually win the home run race 70-66.
- September 27, on the 60th anniversary of Gabby Hartnett's famous pennant-assuring home run, the Chicago Cubs clinched the National League wild-card berth in a one-game playoff on a Monday night, defeating the San Francisco Giants 5–3.
- October 3 the Atlanta Braves completed a three-game sweep of the Cubs in the 1998 NLDS

== 2000s ==
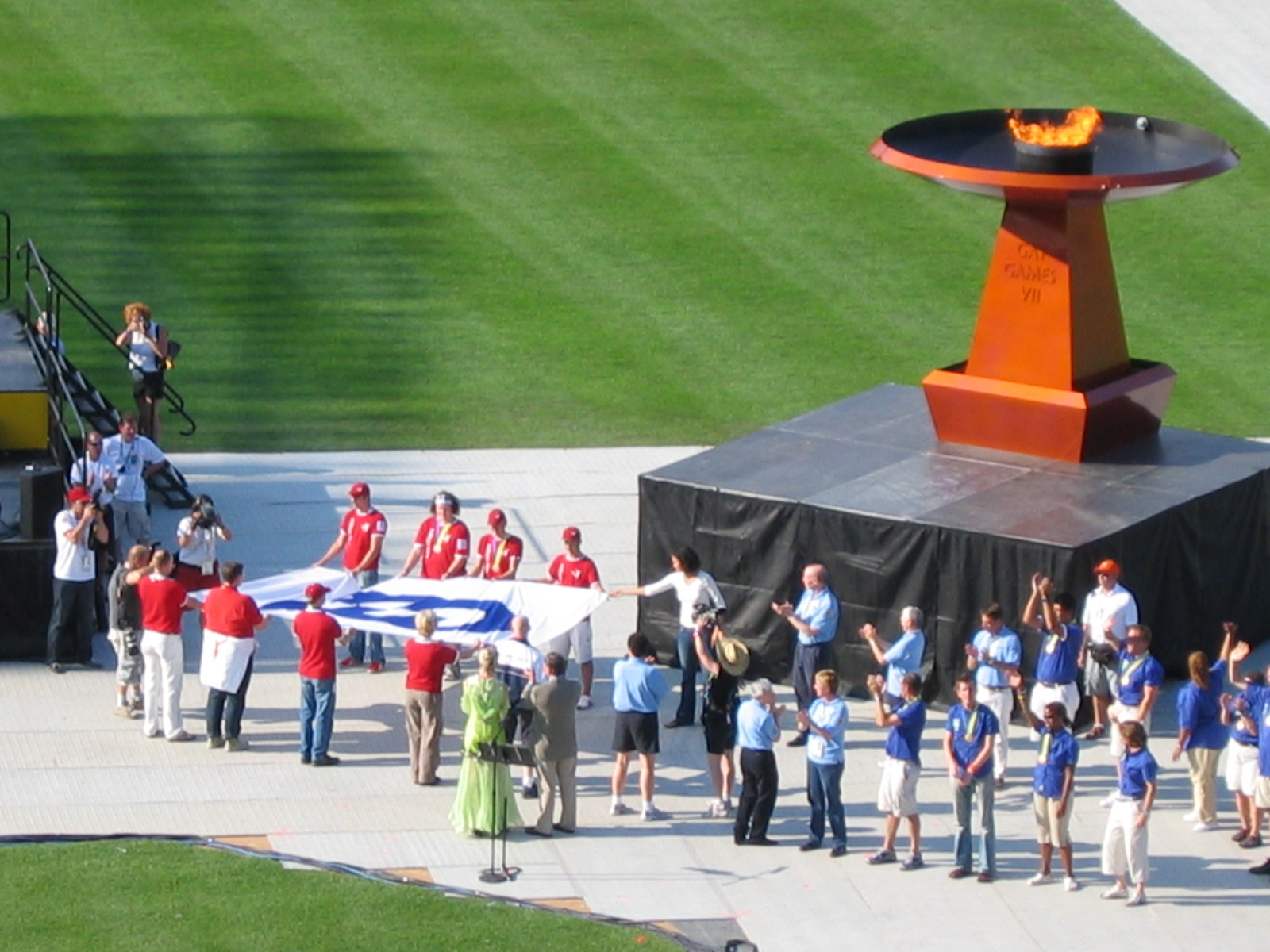
Wrigley Field hosted the closing ceremony of the 2006 Gay Games

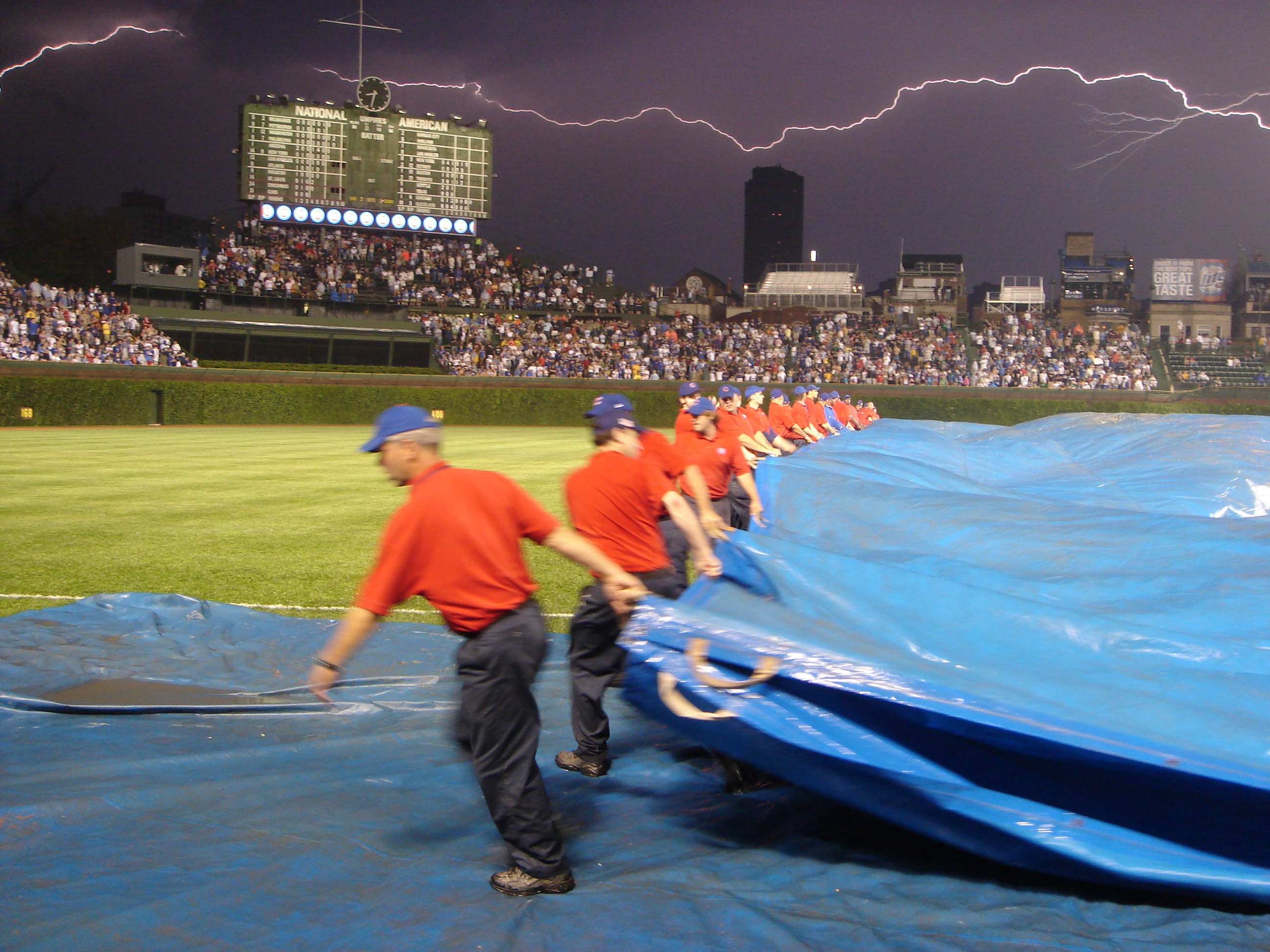
Wrigley Field during a thunder storm

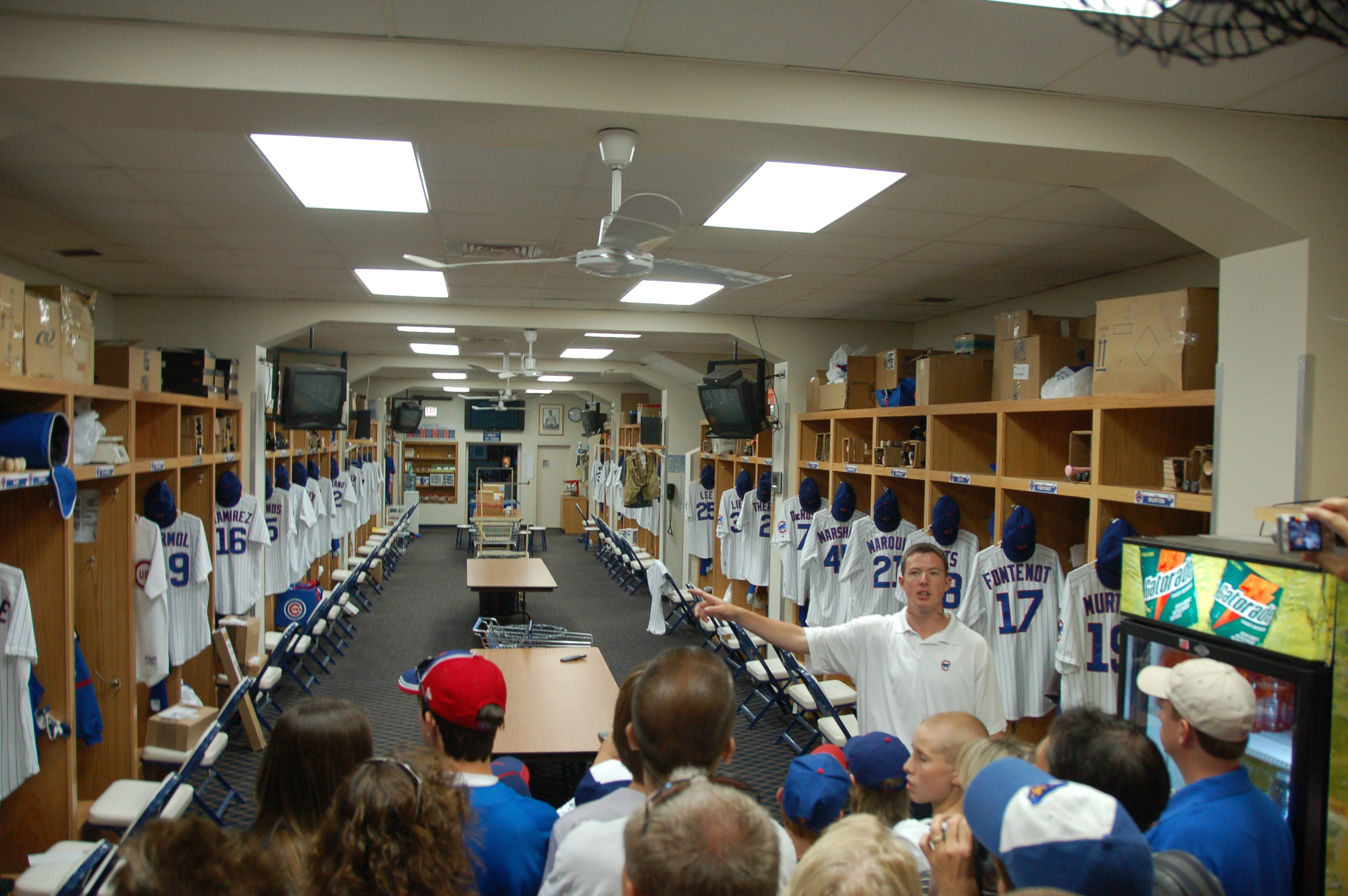
The Chicago Cubs' locker room

=== 2003 ===
- September 27 the Cubs clinched the National League Central Division title with a 7–2 win over the Pittsburgh Pirates.
- October 3 the Cubs win their first postseason game at Wrigley Field in Game 3 of the NLDS for the first time since the 1989 NLCS. The Cubs would go on to beat Atlanta in 5 games.
- October 14 in the top of the eighth inning of the 2003 NLCS Game 6 with the Cubs leading 3–0 and five outs away from their first World Series in 58 years, a fan named Steve Bartman attempted to catch a foul ball, thwarting left fielder Moisés Alou's attempt to catch it. This incident was soon followed by walks, hits, a wild pitch and shortstop Alex S. Gonzalez's crucial error on a potential, inning-ending double play. The 8-run inning resulted in Florida Marlins going on to be the Series Champions.

=== 2004 ===
- September 25 security footage showed Sammy Sosa leaving Wrigley Field 15 minutes after the start of the last game of the 2004 season, which Sosa denied, claiming that he left much later. Sosa would later be traded to the Baltimore Orioles, ending a 12-year stint with the Cubs.

=== 2005 ===
- July 26 Cubs pitcher Greg Maddux struck out Omar Vizquel to become the thirteenth member of the 3000 strikeout club. Maddux is one of only ten ML pitchers to win 300 games and have 3,000 strikeouts; and is the only pitcher to record over 300 wins, over 3,000 strikeouts, and fewer than 1,000 walks.
- September 4 and 5 Jimmy Buffett became first musician to use Wrigley Field as a concert venue.

=== 2006 ===
- June 13 the Cubs became the first team to use cell phones to call to the bullpen at their stadium. Manager Phil Garner of the Houston Astros made the first call to pitching coach Jim Hickey to "test" the line.
- Wrigley Field hosted the closing ceremonies of the 2006 Gay Games.

=== 2007 ===
- July 5 and 6 The Police performed two sold-out Reunion Tour concerts with Fiction Plane that were seen by a cumulative audience of 79,458 and grossed $9,494,248.
- July 30–August 2 the Cubs set a home attendance record for a four-game series with the Philadelphia Phillies, drawing a total of 163,727 spectators.
- August 5 New York Mets pitcher Tom Glavine won the 300th game of his career, defeating the Cubs 8–3.
- October 6 the Cubs were eliminated from the NLDS when they lost 3–0 to the Arizona Diamondbacks.

=== 2008 ===
- March 31: The Cubs welcomed opening day of the 2008 season against the Milwaukee Brewers by unveiling a life-size sculpture of Ernie Banks outside Wrigley Field. The statue originally included a typo, "Lets Play Two", misspelling a phrase Banks was known for saying. An apostrophe was added two days later so the statue would correctly read "Let's Play Two."
- May 16, in only its 25th game of the season, Wrigley Field's season attendance passed the million mark, the fastest in team history.
- June 12, to celebrate the 60th anniversary of WGN-TV broadcasting, the Cubs hosted a "throw-back" game, in which the first two innings were broadcast in black and white as they were in 1948. The Cubs and the Atlanta Braves both wore period uniforms, and for the day the Atlanta Braves reverted their name to the Boston Braves. The Cubs won the game 3-2 in the 13th inning.
- July 29 Wrigley Field hosted, for the first time in its storied history, a minor league game when the Midwest League Peoria Chiefs, coached by Baseball Hall of Famer and former Cubs player Ryne Sandberg, hosted the Kane County Cougars at Wrigley. Over 32,000 fans were present for the contest. The game experienced by dramatic weather. The first-ever home run hit by a minor leaguer at Wrigley Field was hit Greg Dowling of the Kane County Cougars. Dutchie Caray, the widow of legendary Cubs announcer Harry Caray, sang the 7th-inning stretch. The game was called in the 9th due to rain and lightning, tied at 6, and was completed the next day in Peoria with the Chiefs winning 9-8.
- August 4, the stadium was evacuated after tornado warnings in downtown Chicago. The Federal Signal Modulator behind left field sounded for the surrounding Wrigleyville area and farther east in downtown Chicago. This marks the first time that Wrigley Field was evacuated due to threatening weather.
- August 25, Wrigley, with a scheduled day game, became the first major league ballpark to activate instant replay technology, doing so a few hours ahead of the ballparks that had night games scheduled that day.
- September 20, the Cubs clinched the NL Central title with a 5-4 win over the St. Louis Cardinals.

=== 2009 ===
- January 1 the Detroit Red Wings defeated the Chicago Blackhawks 6-4 in the 2009 NHL Winter Classic. It was the first hockey game played at Wrigley Field. It was also the first non-baseball sporting event since the Chicago Sting played their home games at Wrigley in 1984.
- In January Tribune Entertainment announced that they had filed protection in a Cook County Court, and stated that Wrigley Field, and the Chicago Cubs were up for sale. January 22, 2009 Tribune Entertainment stated, that pending the agreement of the MLB owners, Wrigley Field, and the Chicago Cubs, the team would be sold to Tom Ricketts and his family, for $900 million.
- May 3 the Cubs retired the number 31 in honor of both Greg Maddux and Fergie Jenkins.
- July 16 and 21 Elton John and Billy Joel performed two sold-out Face to Face 2009 concerts. The shows were attended by a cumulative audience of 77,520 and grossed $11,154,840.
- October 28 the Ricketts family completed their purchase of the Chicago Cubs and Wrigley Field
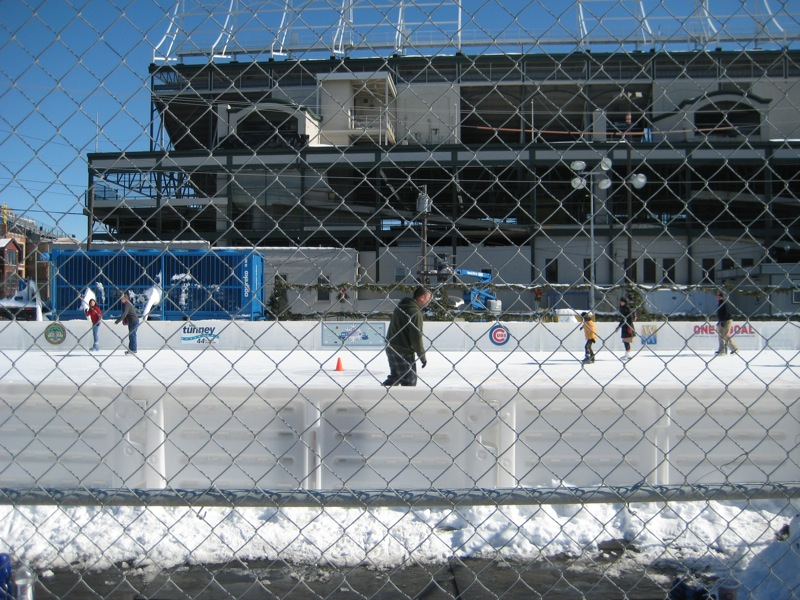
  Wrigley Field ice rink in February 2010.
- In December 2009 Wrigley Field officials announced the late-December opening of a seasonal ice skating rink in a parking lot next to the stadium.

== 2010s ==
=== 2010 ===
- November 20 Northwestern Wildcats and the Illinois Fighting Illini played the first football game at Wrigley Field in 40 years. Due to safety concerns there were several rule changes, the most notable being that offensive plays ran only towards the west end zone. This was because the east end zone in right field game sat within approximately one foot of a heavily padded brick wall. The ball was repositioned after changes in possession to allow this. The annual rivalry game between, the two schools is known as the Land of Lincoln Trophy. This was only the second time the two had played each other in Chicago, the first time also being at Wrigley in 1923.
- September 17 & 18 Dave Matthews Band closed out their 2010 Summer tour with two nights at Wrigley Field. The second evening featured a very memorable triple encore, and the entire concert was recorded and released as Live at Wrigley Field

=== 2011 ===
- July 31 and August 1 Paul McCartney On the Run concerts with Chris Holmes. The two sold-out shows were attended by a cumulative 83,988 spectators and grossed $10,929,728.

=== 2012 ===
- May 18, having announced this to be his final game the day before, Kerry Wood fanned White Sox outfielder Dayán Viciedo on three pitches and then headed to the dugout while receiving a standing ovation from the crowd. He was met outside of the dugout by his young son, Justin, who leapt into his arms.
- June 8 Roger Waters The Wall Live
- June 9 Brad Paisley Virtual Reality World Tour concert with Miranda Lambert, Chris Young, Pistol Annies, and Jerrod Niemann.
- September 7 and 8 Bruce Springsteen and the E Street Band performed two sold-out Wrecking Ball World Tour concerts that were attended by a cumulative 84,218 spectators and grossed $7,090,141.

=== 2013 ===
- July 19 Pearl Jam Lightning Bolt Tour concert. This show became the fastest concert to sell-out at Wrigley Field.
- July 20 Jason Aldean 2013 Night Train Tour concert with Kelly Clarkson was attended by a sold-out crowd of 39,846 and grossed $3.1 million.

=== 2014 ===
- April 26 Northwestern Wildcats and USC Trojans played a lacrosse match.
- April 27 Main South and Glenbard West High Schools Girls Lacrosse teams play first girls High School sports game.
- July 18 Billy Joel in Concert concert.
- July 19 a sold-out Blake Shelton Ten Times Crazier Tour was attended by 40,912 spectators and grossed $2,697,990.

=== 2015 ===
- April 5 Wrigley Field hosted its first opening night against the St. Louis Cardinals. This game aired nationally and became ESPN's first Sunday Night Baseball telecast of the 2015 season.
- June 15 Brandon Flowers The Desired Effect Tour concert at the Captain Morgan Club.
- August 27 Billy Joel in Concert performance.
- August 29 a sold-out Foo Fighters Sonic Highways World Tour concert was attended by 40,788 and grossed $2,501,510.
- September 11 Zac Brown Band Jekyll and Hyde Tour concert.
- September 15 a sold-out AC/DC Rock or Bust World Tour concert was attended by 29,732 spectators and grossed $3,024,480.
- 2015 National League Championship Series

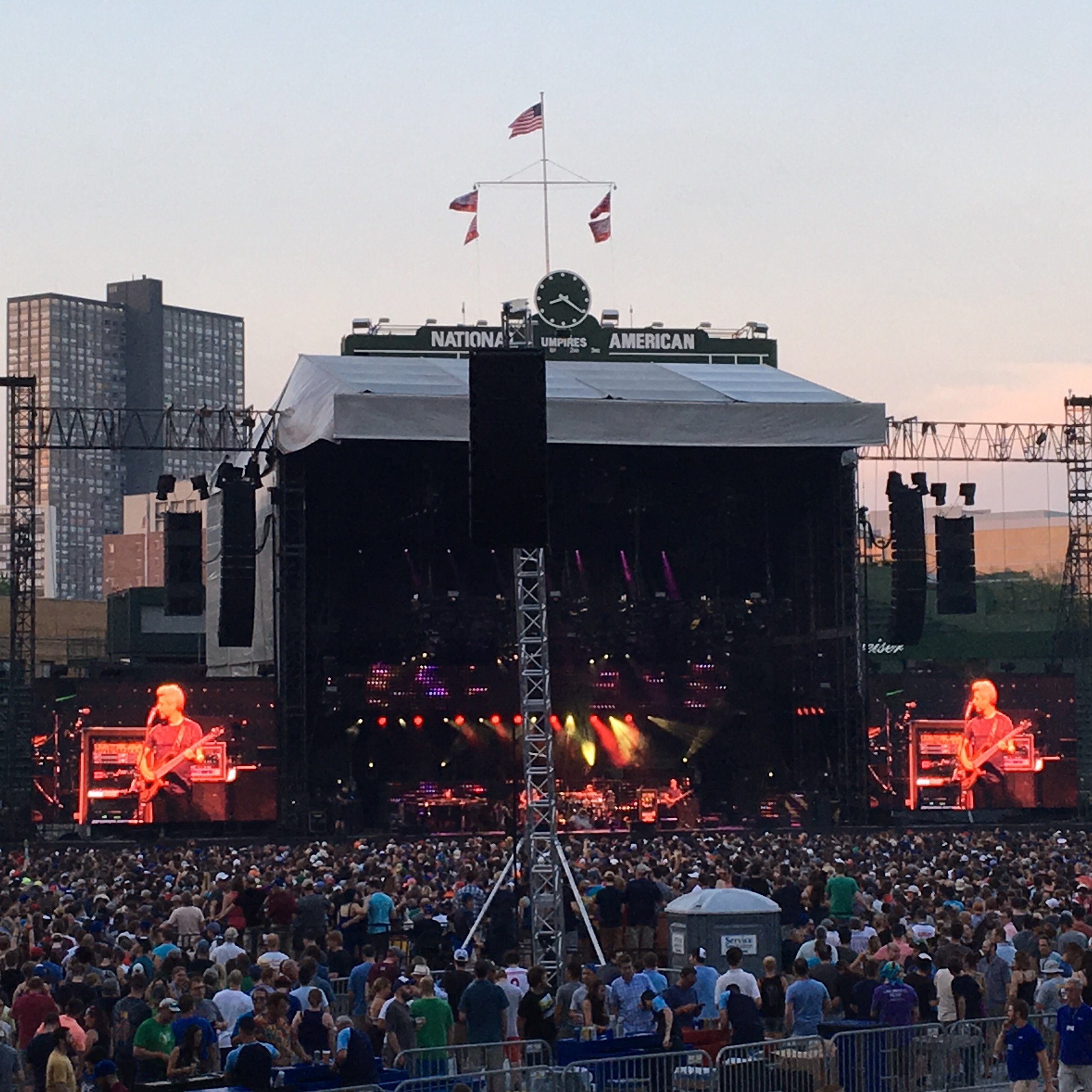
Phish performing at Wrigley in 2016

=== 2016 ===
- June 25/26 Phish played a pair of concerts at Wrigley Field, debuting an inventive a cappella version of the David Bowie song, "Space Oddity."
- June 30, James Taylor played the acoustic guitar for a sold-out crowd, with opener Jackson Browne, and they closed the show with "You Can Close Your Eyes."
- October 15,16, and 22, the Cubs hosted the Los Angeles Dodgers for Games 1, 2, and 6 of the 2016 National League Championship Series. Chicago won Games 1 and 6, earning the National League Championship on the latter win.
- October 28–30, the Cubs hosted the Cleveland Indians for Games 3, 4, and 5 of the 2016 World Series. These teams had not won the World Series since 1908 and 1948, respectively - the two longest active championship droughts in baseball history at the time. Cleveland won Games 3 and 4, but Chicago won Game 5 and went on to win the title in Cleveland with victories in Games 6 and 7.
- November 4, Cubs 2016 World Series victory parade began at Wrigley Field.

=== 2017 ===
- June 30 and July 1, 2017, Dead and Company broke the attendance record of over 80,000.
- August 27, Lady Gaga performed as part of the Joanne World Tour.

=== 2018 ===
- August 18 and 20, Pearl Jam performed as part of the Pearl Jam 2018 Tour
- September 8, Fall Out Boy performed as part of the Mania Tour

== 2020s ==
=== 2020 ===
- July 24, the Cubs opened the pandemic-shortened 2020 season at home against the Milwaukee Brewers.

=== 2024 ===
- November 16: Northwestern hosted #2 Ohio State while construction of the new Ryan Field was ongoing. The Buckeyes defeated the Wildcats 31-7.
- November 30: Northwestern hosted rival Illinois while construction of the new Ryan Field was ongoing. The Illini defeated Northwestern 38-28.
- December 31: 2025 NHL Winter Classic

=== 2025 ===
- January 3 & 4, Frozen Confines college ice hockey series
- July 1, Cleveland Guardians pitcher Gavin Williams recorded an unusual inning against the Chicago Cubs, retiring three baserunners via “non-plate appearance outs” in one inning; One at home plate and two on pickoffs at first base—marking the first such occurrence for Cleveland since at least 1920, and the first in MLB since 1985.

=== 2027 ===
- On July 13, 2027, Wrigley Field will host the 2027 Major League Baseball All-Star Game.

== See also ==
List of events at Soldier Field
