= 1984 National League Championship Series =

16th edition of Major League Baseball's National League Championship Series

Team (Wins)	Managers	Season
San Diego Padres (3)	Dick Williams	92–70, .568, GA: 12
Chicago Cubs (2)	Jim Frey	96–65, .596, GA: 6½
- Dates: October 2–7
- MVP: Steve Garvey (San Diego)
- Umpires: Dick Cavenaugh, Dave Slickenmeyer, Joe Pomponi, Joe Maher (Games 1–2); Terry Bovey, Frank Campagna, Frank Fisher, John Stewart (Games 3–4); John Kibler, Paul Runge, John McSherry, Doug Harvey (Game 5)

Broadcast
- Television: ABC
- TV announcers: Don Drysdale, Earl Weaver, and Reggie Jackson
- Radio: CBS
- Radio announcers: Harry Kalas and Ross Porter

The 1984 National League Championship Series was a best-of-five playoff series in Major League Baseball’s 1984 postseason played between the San Diego Padres and the Chicago Cubs from October 2 to 7. San Diego won the series three games to two to advance to the World Series. It was the first postseason series ever for the Padres since the franchise's beginning in 1969, and the first appearance by the Cubs in postseason play since the 1945 World Series. Chicago took a 2–0 lead in the series, but San Diego prevailed after rebounding to win three straight, which contributed to the popular mythology of the "Curse of the Billy Goat" on the Cubs. The series was the 16th NLCS in all—in 1985 the League Championship Series changed to a best-of-seven format—and one of only four League Championship Series (and the first of two NLCSs) in which the home team won every game.

Due to a strike by major league umpires, the first four games of the NLCS were played with replacement umpires. The umpires originally scheduled to work the series were John Kibler, Frank Pulli, Harry Wendelstedt, Ed Montague, Billy Williams and Bob Engel. Kibler worked Game 5 behind the plate with fellow veterans Paul Runge, John McSherry and Doug Harvey.

== Summary ==
=== San Diego Padres vs. Chicago Cubs ===
San Diego won the series, 3–2.

Game	Date	Score	Location	Time	Attendance
1	October 2	San Diego Padres – 0, Chicago Cubs – 13	Wrigley Field	2:49	36,282
2	October 3	San Diego Padres – 2, Chicago Cubs – 4	Wrigley Field	2:18	36,282
3	October 4	Chicago Cubs – 1, San Diego Padres – 7	Jack Murphy Stadium	2:19	58,346
4	October 6	Chicago Cubs – 5, San Diego Padres – 7	Jack Murphy Stadium	3:13	58,354
5	October 7	Chicago Cubs – 3, San Diego Padres – 6	Jack Murphy Stadium	2:41	58,359

== Game summaries ==
=== Game 1 ===
Tuesday, October 2, 1984, at Wrigley Field in Chicago

Team	1	2	3	4	5	6	7	8	9	R	H	E
San Diego	0	0	0	0	0	0	0	0	0	0	6	1
Chicago	2	0	3	0	6	2	0	0	X	13	16	0
WP: Rick Sutcliffe (1–0) LP: Eric Show (0–1); Home runs: SD: None; CHC: Bob Dernier (1), Gary Matthews 2 (2), Rick Sutcliffe (1), Ron Cey (1)

Bob Dernier and Gary Matthews hit home runs in the first off Eric Show, then Rick Sutcliffe also homered in the third. Later that inning, after a walk, single and fly out, Leon Durham's single and Keith Moreland's sacrifice fly scored a run each. The Cubs then blew the game open in the fifth off Greg Harris. A leadoff double and walk was followed by Matthews's three-run home run, then after a one-out walk and single, Jody Davis's single and Larry Bowa's groundout scored a run each. A walk and single loaded the bases before Ryne Sandberg's RBI single made it 11–0 Cubs. Next inning, Ron Cey's two-out home run off Harris made it 12–0 Cubs, then Davis doubled and scored the last run of the game on Bowa's single. Starting pitcher Rick Sutcliffe held the Padres to two hits over seven strong innings. The Cubs took a 1–0 series lead in a shutout Game 1. This was the Cubs' first postseason win and appearance since Game 7 of the 1945 World Series.

=== Game 2 ===
Wednesday, October 3, 1984, at Wrigley Field in Chicago

Team	1	2	3	4	5	6	7	8	9	R	H	E
San Diego	0	0	0	1	0	1	0	0	0	2	5	0
Chicago	1	0	2	1	0	0	0	0	X	4	8	1
WP: Steve Trout (1–0) LP: Mark Thurmond (0–1) Sv: Lee Smith (1)

Chicago's offense was considerably more subdued in Game 2, though their pitching remained almost as strong. Dernier again opened the scoring for the Cubs in the first off Mark Thurmond, singling to left and coming around to score on two groundouts. In the third, Keith Moreland singled with one out and scored on a double by Ron Cey, who moved to third on the throw to home and scored on Jody Davis's sacrifice fly. San Diego got one back in the fourth when Tony Gwynn doubled, moved to third on a groundout, and scored on a sacrifice fly by Kevin McReynolds off Steve Trout. But Chicago answered in the bottom of the fourth when Ryne Sandberg doubled in Dernier. San Diego cut the lead to 4–2 in the sixth when Alan Wiggins walked with one out, moved to second on a groundout, and scored on a single by Steve Garvey, but the Padres could get no closer against the strong pitching of Steve Trout. Lee Smith came on with one out in the ninth to get the save, and the Cubs were just one victory away from the World Series. The Cubs victory in Game 2 had Chicago's long-suffering fans dreaming of the franchise's first World Series championship since 1908, as they led the series 2–0.

=== Game 3 ===
Thursday, October 4, 1984, at Jack Murphy Stadium in San Diego

Team	1	2	3	4	5	6	7	8	9	R	H	E
Chicago	0	1	0	0	0	0	0	0	0	1	5	0
San Diego	0	0	0	0	3	4	0	0	X	7	11	0
WP: Ed Whitson (1–0) LP: Dennis Eckersley (0–1); Home runs: CHC: None; SD: Kevin McReynolds (1)

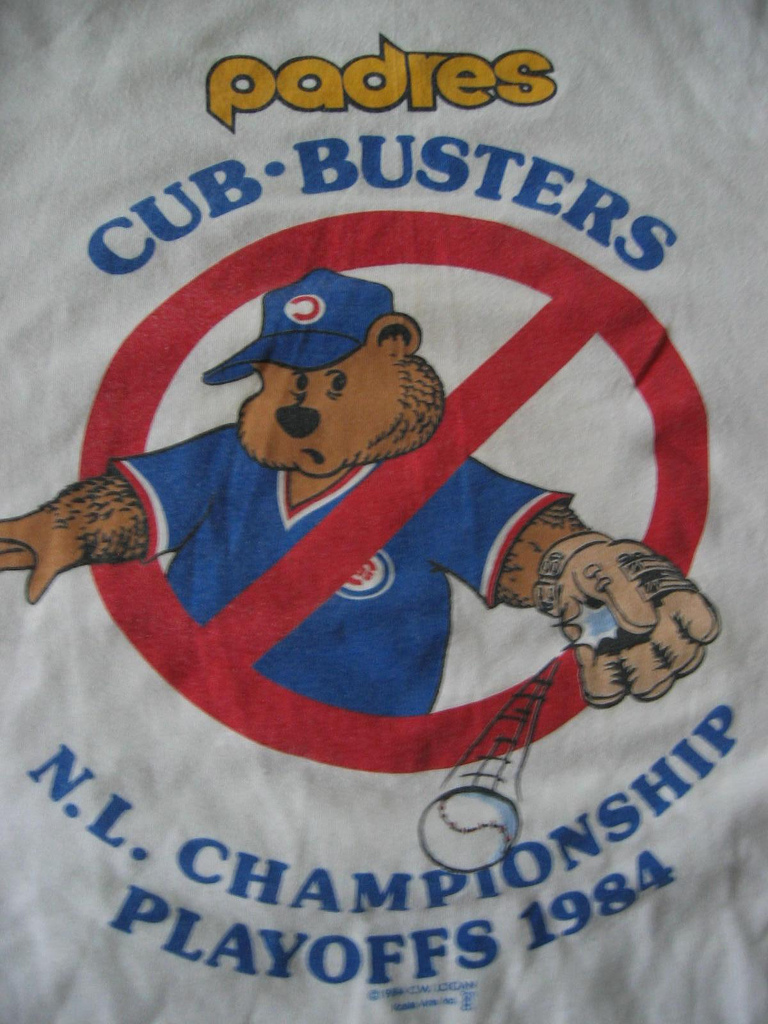
Cub-Busters T-shirts were popular with Padres fans.

The series moved to San Diego, and the Padres staved off elimination with a convincing 7–1 win. During pregame ceremonies, the normally reserved Padres shortstop Garry Templeton encouraged the crowd by waving his cap. He ended a Cubs' rally in the first inning with an acrobatic catch of a line drive from Leon Durham. However, San Diego actually fell behind 1–0 in the second when Chicago's Keith Moreland doubled and came home on Cey's single to center. The Cubs threatened to score more that inning, but Templeton made another excellent play, diving to his right on a line drive from Dernier that appeared destined for left field. But the Cubs would get no more off Padres starter Ed Whitson, while San Diego's bats finally came to life with seven runs in the fifth and sixth off of Dennis Eckersley. Terry Kennedy and Kevin McReynolds led off the fifth with back-to-back singles, then scored on Garry Templeton's double, giving San Diego their first lead of the series at 2–1. One out later, Templeton scored on Alan Wiggins's single to make it 3–1 Padres. Next inning, Tony Gwynn hit a leadoff single, moved to second on a groundout and scored on Graig Nettles's single. George Frazier relieved Eckersley and allowed a single to Kennedy before McReynolds's three-run home run gave the Padres a commanding 7–1 lead. Rich Gossage pitched a dominating ninth inning to wrap up the win for San Diego, their first postseason win in franchise history.

"It was the loudest crowd I've ever heard anywhere", said Gossage, a former New York Yankee. Gwynn agreed as well. Jack Murphy Stadium played "Cub-Busters", a parody of the theme song from the 1984 movie Ghostbusters. Cub-Busters T-shirts inspired from the movie were popular attire for Padres fans. Prior to the game, fans in the parking lot were lynching teddy bears, and singing the "We ain't 'fraid o' no Cubs" lyrics from "Cub-Busters".

=== Game 4 ===
Steve Garvey hit a dramatic two-run shot to keep San Diego's hopes for a pennant alive

Saturday, October 6, 1984, at Jack Murphy Stadium in San Diego

Team	1	2	3	4	5	6	7	8	9	R	H	E
Chicago	0	0	0	3	0	0	0	2	0	5	8	1
San Diego	0	0	2	0	1	0	2	0	2	7	11	0
WP: Craig Lefferts (1–0) LP: Lee Smith (0–1); Home runs: CHC: Jody Davis (1), Leon Durham (1); SD: Steve Garvey (1)

Game 4 proved to be the most dramatic of the series, and it left many Cubs fans dreading another harsh disappointment for the franchise nicknamed the "lovable losers." The Padres jumped out to a 2–0 lead in the third off of Scott Sanderson on a sacrifice fly from Tony Gwynn with two on followed by a run-scoring double from Steve Garvey, but the Cubs took the lead in the fourth off of Tim Lollar on a two-run homer by Jody Davis after a leadoff walk followed by a shot by Leon Durham, who would later suffer ignominy in Game 5. The Padres tied the game in the fifth on an RBI single from Garvey, and took the lead in the seventh when Garvey singled in yet another run after two walks by Tim Stoddard. A passed ball allowed a second tally in the inning to make the score 5–3 San Diego. The Cubs bounced back in the eighth to tie the game off of Rich Gossage when Ryne Sandberg hit a leadoff single, stole second, and scored on an RBI single by Keith Moreland. Right fielder Henry Cotto pinch-ran for Moreland and scored on an RBI double from Davis.

With dominating closer Lee Smith on the mound for the Cubs in the bottom of the ninth, Gwynn singled to center with one out. Garvey then capped an extraordinary five-RBI game by launching a two-run walk-off home run to right center field at the 370 sign, just out of reach of leaping Cubs right fielder Henry Cotto. Previously, he had been hitless against Smith in eight career at bats. During the game, the Padres lost McReynolds for the season after he broke his wrist trying to break up a double play.

It is the first (and so far only) walk-off postseason hit in Padres history.

=== Game 5 ===
Tony Gwynn's ground ball double in the seventh gave the Padres a 5–3 lead on their way to taking home their first league pennant in team history.

Sunday, October 7, 1984, at Jack Murphy Stadium in San Diego

Team	1	2	3	4	5	6	7	8	9	R	H	E
Chicago	2	1	0	0	0	0	0	0	0	3	5	1
San Diego	0	0	0	0	0	2	4	0	X	6	8	0
WP: Craig Lefferts (2–0) LP: Rick Sutcliffe (1–1) Sv: Goose Gossage (1); Home runs: CHC: Leon Durham (2), Jody Davis (2); SD: None

Leon Durham hit a two-run homer in the first after a two-out walk and Jody Davis added a homer in the second to give the Cubs a 3–0 lead off of Padres' starter Eric Show. Rick Sutcliffe, who was 17–1 since joining Chicago in a mid-June trade, and had also beaten the Padres twice in the regular season, allowed just two infield hits through five innings. However, two singles and a walk loaded the bases with no outs for San Diego in the sixth before back-to-back sacrifice flies by Graig Nettles and Terry Kennedy cut the Cubs lead to 3–2. In the bottom of the seventh, Carmelo Martínez led off the inning with a walk on four pitches from Sutcliffe and was sacrificed to second by Garry Templeton. Martínez scored when pinch hitter Tim Flannery's sharp grounder went under Durham's glove and through his legs for an error. Alan Wiggins singled Flannery to second. Gwynn followed with a hard grounder at Sandberg's feet, which the second baseman expect to stay low, but instead bounced over his head into right center for a double; Flannery and Wiggins scored to give the Padres a 5–3 lead as Gwynn reached third. Garvey followed with an RBI single to stretch the lead to 6–3. Steve Trout then replaced Sutcliffe and got out of the inning without further damage.

The Cubs got three baserunners over the final two innings against Gossage but could not score. Jody Davis proved to be the final out, grounding out on a force play that saw Graig Nettles field it to Alan Wiggins at second base as the Padres took their first league pennant. They became the first National League team to win a Championship Series after being down 2–0. Garvey finished the series batting .400 with seven RBIs, and was named the NLCS Most Valuable Player for the second time in his career. The Padres would go on to lose the World Series to the dominant Detroit Tigers in five games. The Cubs' inability to win the series after a 2–0 lead, coupled with Durham's error, added to the Curse of the Billy Goat lore regarding the Cubs' championship drought.

== Composite box ==
1984 NLCS (3–2): San Diego Padres over Chicago Cubs

Team	1	2	3	4	5	6	7	8	9	R	H	E
San Diego Padres	0	0	2	1	4	7	6	0	2	22	41	1
Chicago Cubs	5	2	5	4	6	2	0	2	0	26	42	3
Total attendance: 247,623 Average attendance: 49,525
