= Bob Dernier =

American baseball player (born 1957)

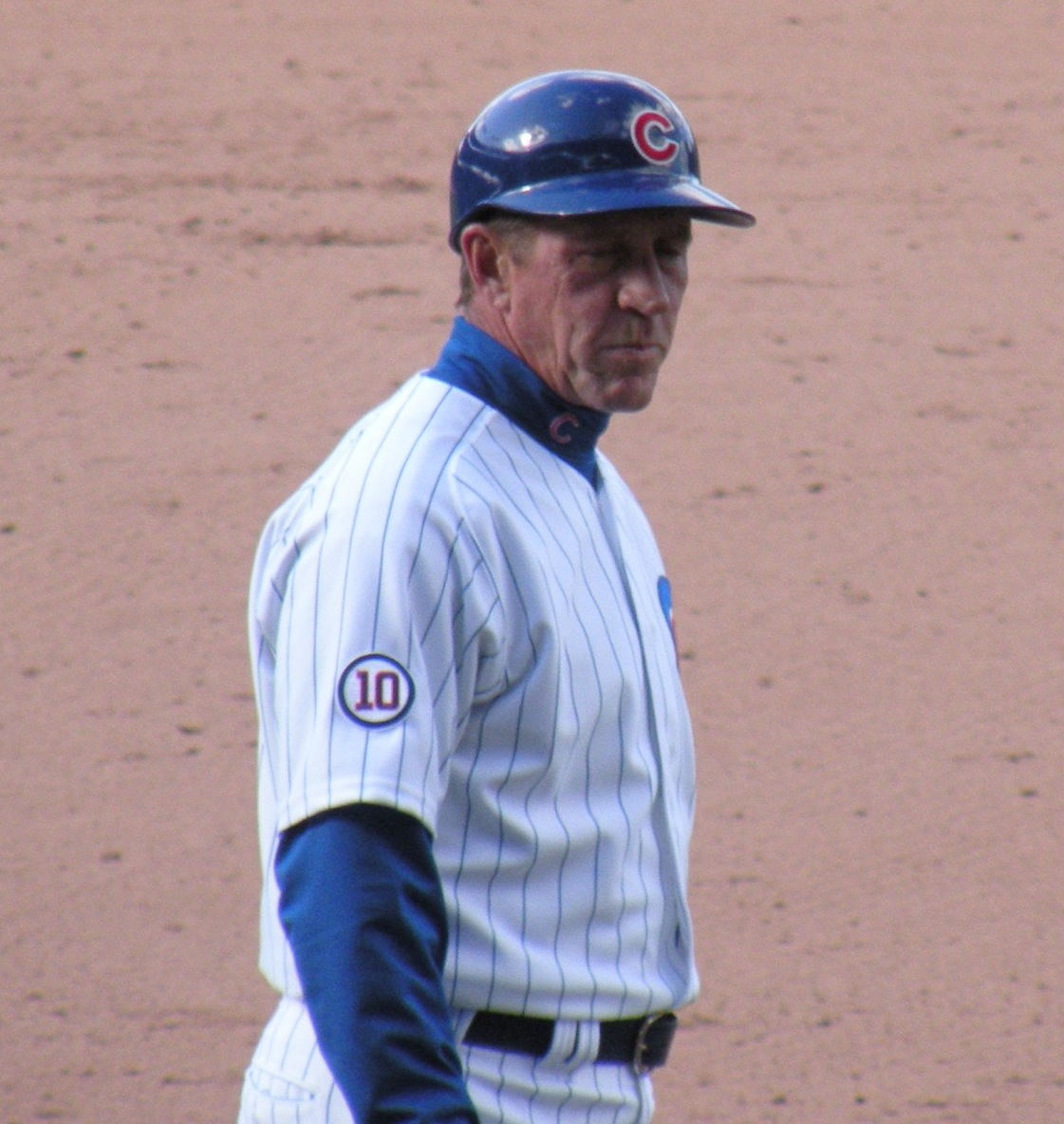
- Dernier as the Cubs' 1st base coach in 2011
- Center fielder
- Born: January 5, 1957 (age 69); Kansas City, Missouri, U.S.
- Batted: Right Threw: Right

MLB debut
- September 7, 1980, for the Philadelphia Phillies

Last MLB appearance
- October 1, 1989, for the Philadelphia Phillies

MLB statistics
- Batting average: .255
- Home runs: 23
- Runs batted in: 152
- Stolen bases: 218
- Stats at Baseball Reference

Teams
- As player: Philadelphia Phillies (1980–1983); Chicago Cubs (1984–1987); Philadelphia Phillies (1988–1989); As coach: Chicago Cubs (2010–2011)

Career highlights and awards
- Gold Glove Award (1984)

Robert Eugene Dernier (born January 5, 1957) is an American former professional baseball center fielder who played in Major League Baseball (MLB) for the Philadelphia Phillies and Chicago Cubs in the 1980s. The fleet-afoot 1984 Gold Glove Award winner was also known as "the Deer", to fans at Chicago's Wrigley Field. Dernier experimented as a switch hitter during part of the 1983 season with Philadelphia.

== Biography ==
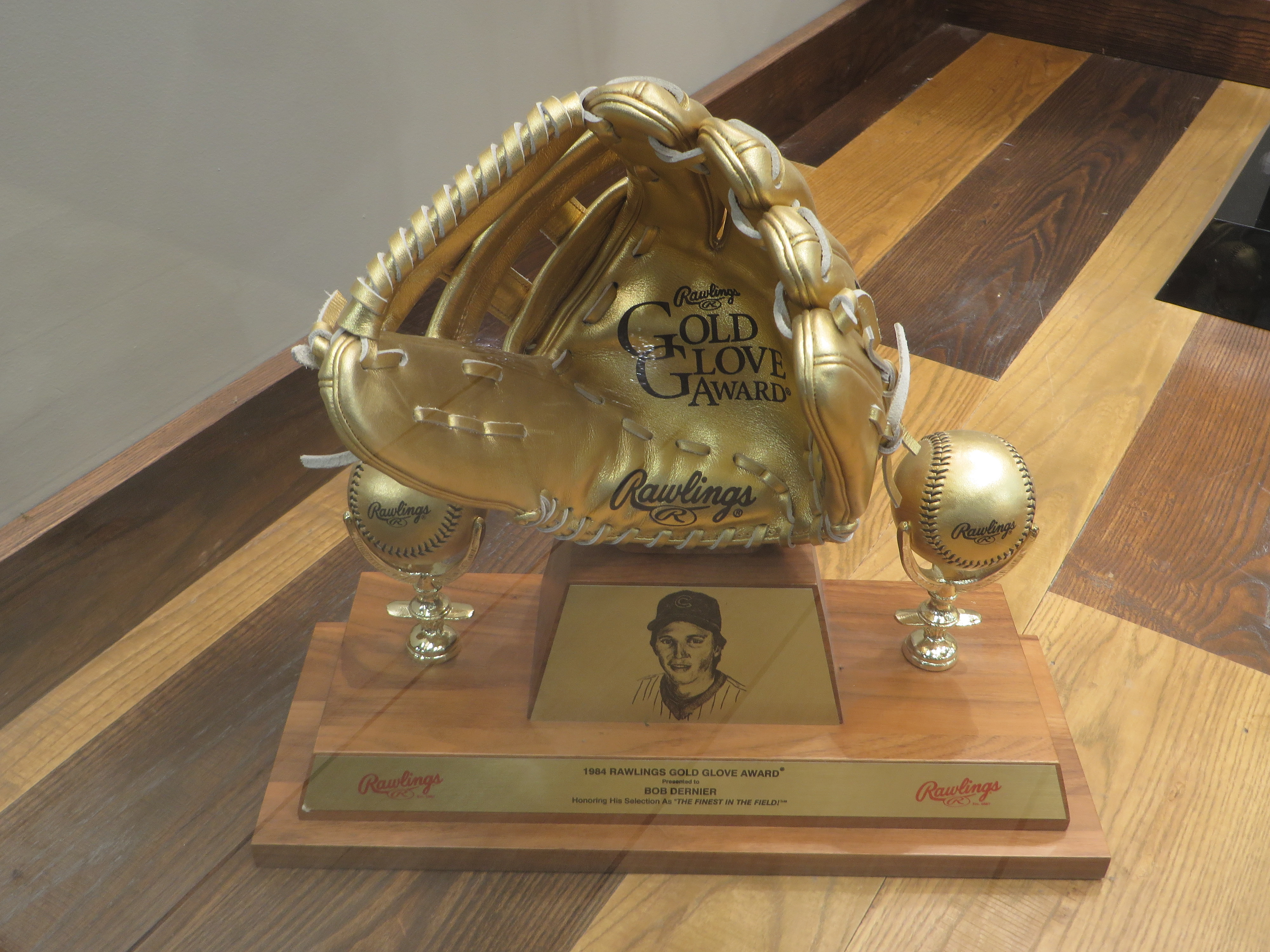
Trophy for the 1984 Gold Glove Award, received by Dernier

After graduating from high school in Raytown, Missouri, Dernier attended Longview Community College, where he played baseball and majored in journalism. He led the minor leagues three times in stolen bases—77 with Peninsula in 1979, 71 with Reading in 1980, and 71 for Oklahoma City in 1981.

Dernier was traded along with Gary Matthews and Porfi Altamirano from the Phillies to the Cubs for Bill Campbell and Mike Diaz on March 27, 1984. He was the leadoff hitter for the Cubs' 1984 National League East division championship team. Hall of Fame second baseman Ryne Sandberg batted second and the lead-off pair was dubbed "The Daily Double" by Cubs announcer Harry Caray. Dernier was a member of the 1983 Phillies team, which won the National League pennant but lost the World Series to the Baltimore Orioles, and the 1984 Cubs team which won the NL East but lost in the playoffs to the San Diego Padres. He homered to lead off the first inning of Game 1 in the 1984 National League Championship Series, the first postseason home run hit by a Cub since Phil Cavarretta of the 1945 World Series. The home run kicked off a 13–0 victory for the Cubs. Dernier batted .235 in the series with just four hits and five runs scored as the Cubs lost the series in five games.

From the mid-1990s through at least 2004, Dernier was an instructor at a baseball training academy in Kansas City. Dernier was named the Cubs major league first base coach on August 23, 2010, after serving as the team's minor league outfield and base-running coordinator since 2007. He remained a Cub coach until the end of the 2011 season.

== See also ==
- List of Major League Baseball career stolen bases leaders
