= Mike Diaz =

American baseball player (born 1960)

Michael Diaz
- Catcher / First baseman / Outfielder
- Born: April 15, 1960 (age 66); San Francisco, California, U.S.
- Batted: Right Threw: Right

Professional debut
- MLB: September 15, 1983, for the Chicago Cubs
- NPB: April 19, 1989, for the Lotte Orions

Last appearance
- MLB: October 2, 1988, for the Chicago White Sox
- NPB: June 16, 1992, for the Chiba Lotte Marines

MLB statistics
- Batting average: .247
- Home runs: 31
- Runs batted in: 102

NPB statistics
- Batting average: .281
- Home runs: 93
- Runs batted in: 264
- Stats at Baseball Reference

Teams
- Chicago Cubs (1983); Pittsburgh Pirates (1986–1988); Chicago White Sox (1988); Lotte Orions/Chiba Lotte Marines (1989–1992)

Career highlights and awards
- NPB All-Star (1989)

Michael Anthony Diaz (born April 15, 1960) is an American former professional baseball player. He played all or part of four seasons in Major League Baseball between 1983 and 1988, for the Chicago Cubs, Pittsburgh Pirates and Chicago White Sox. He also played four seasons in Nippon Professional Baseball (NPB) from 1989 to 1992. After starting his career as a catcher, he split his time about equally between first base and the outfield.

He was traded along with Bill Campbell from the Cubs to the Philadelphia Phillies for Gary Matthews, Bob Dernier and Porfi Altamirano on March 27, 1984.

A fan favorite in Pittsburgh, he earned the nickname "Rambo" due to his prodigious power & Stallone-esque physique. He even appeared on his own "Rambo" poster with the proceeds going to Pittsburgh's Children's Hospital. Following his major league career, he played four seasons in Japan, from 1989 until 1992, for the Lotte Orions (who in 1992 became the Chiba Lotte Marines). He was nicknamed "Rambo-san" there due to a perceived resemblance to Sylvester Stallone. In 1990, he became the first foreign player to catch a game in NPB in 12 years.
