= Chuck Rainey (baseball) =

American baseball player (born 1954)

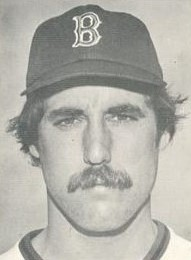
- Pitcher
- Born: July 14, 1954 (age 72); San Diego, California, U.S.
- Batted: Right Threw: Right

MLB debut
- April 8, 1979, for the Boston Red Sox

Last MLB appearance
- September 9, 1984, for the Oakland Athletics

MLB statistics
- Win–loss record: 43–35
- Earned run average: 4.50
- Strikeouts: 300
- Stats at Baseball Reference

Teams
- Boston Red Sox (1979–1982); Chicago Cubs (1983–1984); Oakland Athletics (1984)

Charles David Rainey (born July 14, 1954) is an American former professional baseball player who pitched in the Major Leagues from 1979 to 1984.

== Professional career ==
Rainey was drafted in the first round (19th overall) of the 1974 amateur draft by the Boston Red Sox and made his MLB debut on April 8, 1979, at Cleveland Stadium against the Indians. He spent four seasons on the Boston pitching staff before being traded to the Chicago Cubs for Doug Bird in December 1982. Rainey had his most successful season as a starter in 1983 with the Cubs, leading the rotation with 14 wins. On August 24 of that year, against the Cincinnati Reds at Wrigley Field, he had a no-hitter broken up with two out in the ninth by an Eddie Milner single, the only hit Rainey would allow in a 3–0 Cub victory. The no-hitter would have been the first by a Cub (and the first one the Cubs had been involved in) since Milt Pappas in 1972.

Midway through the 1984 season Rainey was traded (along with a player to be named later) to the Oakland Athletics for Davey Lopes. The Cubs later sent minor leaguer Damon Farmar to the Athletics, completing the trade.

Rainey's final MLB appearance was on September 9, 1984, as the Indians downed the Athletics 7 - 5.
