= Reggie Patterson =

American baseball player (born 1958)

- Pitcher
- Born: November 7, 1958 (age 67); Birmingham, Alabama, U.S.
- Batted: Right Threw: Right

MLB debut
- August 13, 1981, for the Chicago White Sox

Last MLB appearance
- October 6, 1985, for the Chicago Cubs

MLB statistics
- Win–loss record: 4–4
- Earned run average: 5.20
- Strikeouts: 34
- Stats at Baseball Reference

Teams
- Chicago White Sox (1981); Chicago Cubs (1983–1985)

Reginald Allen Patterson (born November 7, 1958) is an American former professional baseball player who was a pitcher in the Major Leagues.

== Career ==
Patterson was signed by the Chicago White Sox as an amateur free agent in June 1979. He made his MLB debut in 1981 for the Chicago White Sox shortly after the settlement of the baseball strike. In his debut on August 13, he was the starting pitcher facing the Boston Red Sox at Fenway Park, but lasted only 1 2/3 innings surrendering 6 runs on 6 hits (including a 2-run home run to Carl Yastrzemski) en route to a 9–6 loss. He failed make the Major League roster in 1982, spending the season with the Edmonton Trappers in the Triple-A Pacific Coast League. After the season, he was traded to the Chicago Cubs for Tye Waller.

Patterson played for the Chicago Cubs organization for the next three seasons (1983–1985) splitting his time between the Major Leagues (as a September call-up) and the Iowa Cubs in the Triple-A American Association. On September 8, 1985, Pete Rose hit his 4,191st hit against Patterson with a single in the first inning of a Reds' 5–5 called game against Chicago, which according to independent research, was actually the hit that broke the all-time hits record. On March 31, 1986, he was released by the Cubs.

Patterson finished his professional career pitching for the Tecolotes de los Dos Laredos in the Mexican League in 1986. In between, he played winter ball in the Dominican Republic, Puerto Rico and Venezuela.
