= Ron Cey =

American baseball player (born 1948)

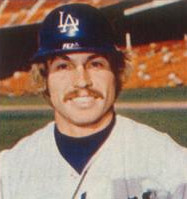
- Cey c. 1977
- Third baseman
- Born: February 15, 1948 (age 78); Tacoma, Washington, U.S.
- Batted: Right Threw: Right

MLB debut
- September 3, 1971, for the Los Angeles Dodgers

Last MLB appearance
- July 12, 1987, for the Oakland Athletics

MLB statistics
- Batting average: .261
- Home runs: 316
- Runs batted in: 1,139
- Stats at Baseball Reference

Teams
- Los Angeles Dodgers (1971–1982); Chicago Cubs (1983–1986); Oakland Athletics (1987)

Career highlights and awards
- 6× All-Star (1974–1979); World Series champion (1981); World Series MVP (1981); Legend of Dodger Baseball

Ronald Charles Cey (/ˈseɪ/; born February 15, 1948), nicknamed "the Penguin," is an American former professional baseball player. He played in Major League Baseball as a third baseman from 1971 through 1987, most notably as an integral member of the Los Angeles Dodgers teams that won four National League pennants and one World Series championship. A six-time All-Star, Cey was named the World Series MVP after leading the Dodgers to victory during the 1981 World Series. He ended his career playing for the Chicago Cubs and the Oakland Athletics. Cey was nicknamed "The Penguin" for his slow waddling running gait by his college coach, Chuck "Bobo" Brayton.

== Early years ==
Born and raised in Tacoma, Washington, Cey was a multi-sport athlete at Mount Tahoma High School, its first to earn nine varsity letters. Following graduation in 1966, he attended Washington State University in Pullman and was a member of the Phi Delta Theta fraternity. Cey played two years of college baseball for the Cougars, on the freshman team in 1967, and a year on the varsity under head coach Brayton in 1968. He was selected in the second phase of the 1968 MLB draft in June.

== Professional career ==
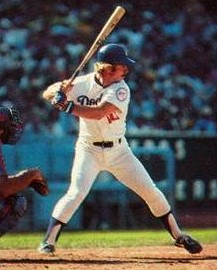
Cey at bat for the Dodgers in 1981

With the Dodgers, third baseman Cey was part of an All-Star infield that included Steve Garvey (first baseman), Davey Lopes (second baseman) and Bill Russell (shortstop). The four infielders stayed together as the Dodgers' starters for eight and a half years. In 1977, he was named NL Player of the Month in April after helping the Dodgers to a fast start by batting .425 with 9 home runs and a major league record 29 RBIs for the month of April. The Dodgers won the Western Division title that season on their way to the National League pennant.

Cey continued to have productive seasons with the Dodgers, helping them to pennants in 1978 and 1981. After the 1982 season, the Dodgers traded Cey to the Chicago Cubs for two minor leaguers so that Pedro Guerrero could move to third base and rookie Mike Marshall could get in the Dodgers' outfield. Cey provided veteran leadership for the Cubs over four seasons and, in 1984, helped lead the Cubs to the National League East Division title, hitting 25 homers and driving in 97 runs, both team highs. Cey spent the final year of his career in 1987 as a part-time player with the Oakland A's.

In a 16-season career, Cey was a .261 hitter with 316 home runs and 1139 RBI in 2073 games.

Cey finished in the top 25 in National League MVP voting four times with the Los Angeles Dodgers (1974–1977) and once with the Chicago Cubs (1984). His highest position in MVP voting came in 1977, when he finished eighth with a career-high 30 home runs and 110 RBIs. In 1973, he finished sixth in National League Rookie of the Year voting.

Cey played in the 1981 World Series, helping the Dodgers to four straight victories after losing their first two games, including his return for the clinching Game 6 after being hit in the head by a wild Goose Gossage fastball, and helped off the field in Game 5. Cey was named co-MVP along with Steve Yeager and Pedro Guerrero, and won the annual Babe Ruth Award. He is still a part of the Dodgers organization and continues to make appearances on the team's behalf.

"Cey, called Penguin for his peculiar way of running, was a grumpy little guy," recalled Dodger teammate Tommy John. "If you came into the locker room and said 'Hi, how you doing, Penguin?' and he gave you a grunt, you knew he liked you. We called him Mr. Personality. As a defensive player, his range was limited and so was his arm, but he was accurate. If he caught the ball, it was an out. Offensively, he was capable of outbursts of slugging that could carry the team."

In 1990, Cey appeared as himself in the "Uneasy Lies the Crown" episode of the television series "Columbo", which aired on the ABC network. In the episode, Cey played poker with actors Dick Sargent and Nancy Walker.

=== Career statistics ===
Category	G	BA	AB	R	H	2B	3B	HR	RBI	SB	CS	BB	SO	OBP	SLG	OPS	PO	A	DP	E	FLD%	Ref.
Total	2,073	.261	7,162	977	1,868	328	21	316	1,139	24	29	1,012	1,235	.354	.445	.799	1,500	4,018	315	223	.961	

== See also ==
- List of Major League Baseball career assists as a third baseman leaders
- List of Major League Baseball career double plays as a third baseman leaders
- List of Major League Baseball career fielding errors as a third baseman leaders
- List of Major League Baseball career home run leaders
- List of Major League Baseball career putouts as a third baseman leaders
- List of Major League Baseball career runs batted in leaders
- List of Major League Baseball career WAR leaders
- Los Angeles Dodgers award winners and league leaders

Awards and achievements
Preceded by Steve Garvey	National League Player of the Month; April 1977	Succeeded by Ken Reitz
