= Keith Moreland =

American baseball player (born 1954)

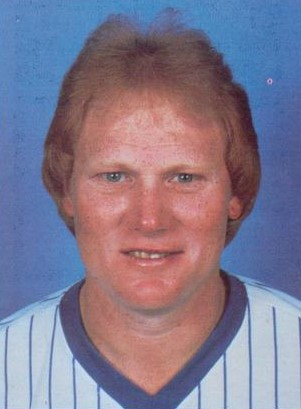
- Moreland with the Chicago Cubs in 1985
- Right fielder
- Born: May 2, 1954 (age 72); Dallas, Texas, U.S.
- Batted: Right Threw: Right

MLB debut
- October 1, 1978, for the Philadelphia Phillies

Last MLB appearance
- September 24, 1989, for the Baltimore Orioles

MLB statistics
- Batting average: .279
- Home runs: 121
- Runs batted in: 674
- Stats at Baseball Reference

Teams
- Philadelphia Phillies (1978–1981); Chicago Cubs (1982–1987); San Diego Padres (1988); Detroit Tigers (1989); Baltimore Orioles (1989)

Career highlights and awards
- World Series champion (1980)

Member of the College

Baseball Hall of Fame
- Induction: 2009

Bobby Keith Moreland (born May 2, 1954), nicknamed "Zonk", is an American former outfielder, catcher, and infielder in Major League Baseball who played for the Philadelphia Phillies, Chicago Cubs, and San Diego Padres. In 1989, the final year of his career, he played for the Detroit Tigers, then the Baltimore Orioles. On February 16, 2011, he was named the Cubs' color analyst on WGN-AM and the Cubs Radio Network, replacing Ron Santo. On November 6, 2013, he announced that he was stepping down from his position at WGN Radio to spend more time with his family.

== College career ==
Moreland played college baseball and football at The University of Texas at Austin.

Moreland came to Texas as two-sport athlete and played football on the 1972 freshman team and then on the 1973 Texas Longhorn football team that won the Southwest Conference Championship and lost the Cotton Bowl to Nebraska. After that he chose to focus on Baseball.

Moreland played 3rd base for the Longhorns from 1973-75. He was a three-time All-American and led the team to three NCAA College World Series berths and, as co-captain, the national championship in 1975. He was a .388 hitter with Texas and hit .410 over a 62-game schedule in 1975.

Moreland was named to College World Series All-Decade Team for the 1970s. He has the second most career hits in College World Series history with 23 in 3 years (1973–75), behind only Sam Fuld of Stanford.

In 1985, he was inducted into the Longhorn Hall of Honor and on May 1, 2010, Moreland's Longhorn number 3 was retired by The University of Texas.

== Pro baseball career ==
After college he was drafted by the Phillies in the seventh round of the 1975 draft. He started out as a catcher, but the Phillies also played him at third base and first base. He was traded along with Dickie Noles and Dan Larson from the Phillies to the Cubs for Mike Krukow on December 8, 1981. During his time with the Cubs, he was primarily used as a corner outfielder, except in his final year. He was dealt along with Mike Brumley from the Cubs to the Padres for Goose Gossage and Ray Hayward on February 12, 1988. In 1989, playing for American League teams, he also made 80 appearances as a designated hitter.

Moreland was acquired by the Orioles from the Tigers for Brian Dubois on July 28, 1989. The Orioles needed a power hitter for its pennant drive and settled for Moreland after its failed pursuit of Harold Baines. Prior to an 11–1 loss to the Chicago White Sox at Memorial Stadium on September 12, a frustrated Moreland, who at the time was mired in a .212 slump with one home run and 10 RBI in 104 at-bats in 30 games since joining the ball club, complained, "I'm not going to hit anymore. My career is over." Orioles manager Frank Robinson responded, "If he wants to retire, retire now. If he's not going to retire, he should be here keeping himself ready to go out and do whatever I ask." The misunderstanding was resolved by the team before it became a bigger distraction. Moreland eventually retired as an active player after the conclusion of the season.

Moreland played twelve seasons in Major League Baseball. He helped the Cubs win the 1984 National League Eastern Division championship. His best year was in 1985 with the Cubs, when he batted .307 (14 HR, 106 RBI, 12 SB). He also had a good year in 1987, with 27 HR and 88 RBI. In 1988 as a member of the San Diego Padres, he was the last player to wear #6 before it was retired in honor of Steve Garvey.

Career Hitting
G	AB	H	2B	3B	HR	R	RBI	SB	BB	SO	AVG	OBP	SLG	OPS
1,306	4,581	1,279	214	14	121	511	674	28	405	515	.279	.335	.411	.746

== Broadcasting career ==
Moreland has worked as a color analyst for the radio broadcasts of Texas Longhorn football and baseball, as he is a former player for both teams. He has also worked as an occasional fill-in analyst for the Cubs telecasts on WGN-TV, WCIU-TV, and Comcast SportsNet Chicago when regular analyst Bob Brenly wasn't available.

On February 16, 2011, it was announced that Moreland would be the Cubs' full-time radio color analyst on WGN-AM and the Cubs Radio Network, replacing the late Ron Santo. On November 6, 2013, he announced that he was stepping down from his position at WGN Radio to spend more time with his family.

Moreland announces college football games for ASN.

Preceded by José Cruz	National League Player of the Month; August, 1984	Succeeded by Dale Murphy
Preceded by Ron Santo	Chicago Cubs Radio Color Commentator; 2011–2013	Succeeded by Ron Coomer
