= 1984 Pittsburgh Pirates season =

1984 Pittsburgh Pirates
- League: National League
- Division: East
- Ballpark: Three Rivers Stadium
- City: Pittsburgh, Pennsylvania
- Record: 75–87 (.463)
- Divisional place: 6th
- Owners: John W. Galbreath; Warner Communications
- General managers: Harding "Pete" Peterson
- Managers: Chuck Tanner
- Television: KDKA-TV (Lanny Frattare, Jim Rooker, John Sanders); HSE (Steve Blass, Bob Prince, Willie Stargell)
- Radio: KDKA-AM (Lanny Frattare, Jim Rooker)

The 1984 Pittsburgh Pirates season was the 103rd season of the franchise; the 98th in the National League. This was their 15th season at Three Rivers Stadium. The Pirates finished sixth and last in the National League East with a record of 75–87.

== Regular season ==
=== Season standings ===
NL East
| Team | W | L | Pct. | GB | Home | Road |
|---|---|---|---|---|---|---|
| Chicago Cubs | 96 | 65 | .596 | — | 51‍–‍29 | 45‍–‍36 |
| New York Mets | 90 | 72 | .556 | 6½ | 48‍–‍33 | 42‍–‍39 |
| St. Louis Cardinals | 84 | 78 | .519 | 12½ | 44‍–‍37 | 40‍–‍41 |
| Philadelphia Phillies | 81 | 81 | .500 | 15½ | 39‍–‍42 | 42‍–‍39 |
| Montreal Expos | 78 | 83 | .484 | 18 | 39‍–‍42 | 39‍–‍41 |
| Pittsburgh Pirates | 75 | 87 | .463 | 21½ | 41‍–‍40 | 34‍–‍47 |

=== Record vs. opponents ===
1984 National League record Sources:
| Team | ATL | CHC | CIN | HOU | LAD | MON | NYM | PHI | PIT | SD | SF | STL |
|---|---|---|---|---|---|---|---|---|---|---|---|---|
| Atlanta | — | 3–9 | 13–5 | 12–6 | 6–12 | 5–7 | 4–8 | 7–5 | 8–4 | 7–11 | 10–8 | 5–7 |
| Chicago | 9–3 | — | 7–5 | 6–6 | 7–5 | 10–7 | 12–6 | 9–9 | 8–10 | 6–6 | 9–3 | 13–5 |
| Cincinnati | 5–13 | 5–7 | — | 8–10 | 7–11 | 7–5 | 3–9 | 5–7 | 7–5 | 7–11 | 12–6 | 4–8 |
| Houston | 6–12 | 6–6 | 10–8 | — | 9–9 | 7–5 | 4–8 | 6–6 | 6–6 | 6–12 | 12–6 | 8–4 |
| Los Angeles | 12–6 | 5–7 | 7–11 | 9–9 | — | 6–6 | 3–9 | 3–9 | 4–8 | 10–8 | 10–8 | 6–6 |
| Montreal | 7–5 | 7–10 | 5–7 | 5–7 | 6–6 | — | 7–11 | 11–7 | 7–11 | 7–5 | 7–5 | 9–9 |
| New York | 8–4 | 6–12 | 9–3 | 8–4 | 9–3 | 11–7 | — | 10–8 | 12–6 | 6–6 | 4–8 | 7–11 |
| Philadelphia | 5-7 | 9–9 | 7–5 | 6–6 | 9–3 | 7–11 | 8–10 | — | 7–11 | 7–5 | 8–4 | 8–10 |
| Pittsburgh | 4–8 | 10–8 | 5–7 | 6–6 | 8–4 | 11–7 | 6–12 | 11–7 | — | 4–8 | 6–6 | 4–14 |
| San Diego | 11–7 | 6–6 | 11–7 | 12–6 | 8–10 | 5–7 | 6–6 | 5–7 | 8–4 | — | 13–5 | 7–5 |
| San Francisco | 8–10 | 3–9 | 6–12 | 6–12 | 8–10 | 5–7 | 8–4 | 4–8 | 6–6 | 5–13 | — | 7–5 |
| St. Louis | 7–5 | 5–13 | 8–4 | 4–8 | 6–6 | 9–9 | 11–7 | 10–8 | 14–4 | 5–7 | 5–7 | — |

=== Game log ===
1984 Game Log: 75–87 (Home: 41–40; Away: 34–47)
April: 7–13 (Home: 2–4; Away: 5–9)

| # | Date | Opponent | Score | Win | Loss | Save | Attendance | Record |
|---|---|---|---|---|---|---|---|---|
| 1 | April 3 | @ Padres | 1–5 | Show | **Rhoden** (0–1) | — | 44,553 | 0–1 |
| 2 | April 5 | @ Padres | 6–8 | DeLeon | **Scurry** (0–1) | Gossage | 19,361 | 0–2 |
| 3 | April 6 | @ Dodgers | 3–1 | **Tudor** (1–0) | Welch | **Guante** (1) | 39,820 | 1–2 |
| 4 | April 7 | @ Dodgers | 3–0 | **Candelaria** (1–0) | Pena | **Robinson** (1) | 32,403 | 2–2 |
| 5 | April 8 | @ Dodgers | 5–2 | **Rhoden** (1–1) | Valenzuela | **Guante** (2) | 41,550 | 3–2 |
| 6 | April 10 | @ Giants | 3–4 | Krukow | **McWilliams** (0–1) | Minton | 6,837 | 3–3 |
| 7 | April 11 | @ Giants | 1–2 (10) | Lavelle | **Guante** (0–1) | — | 8,773 | 3–4 |
| 8 | April 13 | @ Cardinals | 1–4 | LaPoint | **Candelaria** (1–1) | Sutter | 45,453 | 3–5 |
| 9 | April 14 | @ Cardinals | 5–7 | Cox | **Rhoden** (1–2) | Sutter | 23,602 | 3–6 |
| 10 | April 15 | @ Cardinals | 0–1 | Rucker | **McWilliams** (0–2) | Sutter | 24,099 | 3–7 |
| 11 | April 17 | Phillies | 1–4 | Hudson | **Tudor** (1–1) | Holland | 34,114 | 3–8 |
| 12 | April 18 | Phillies | 6–3 | **Candelaria** (2–1) | Koosman | **Robinson** (2) | 2,752 | 4–8 |
| 13 | April 20 | @ Cubs | 4–5 (10) | Stoddard | **Tekulve** (0–1) | — | 22,049 | 4–9 |
| 14 | April 21 | @ Cubs | 8–5 | **DeLeon** (1–0) | Noles | **Robinson** (3) | 21,936 | 5–9 |
| 15 | April 24 | @ Phillies | 3–2 | **Candelaria** (3–1) | Koosman | **Tekulve** (1) | 14,096 | 6–9 |
| 16 | April 25 | @ Phillies | 7–8 | McGraw | **Tunnell** (0–1) | Holland | 20,622 | 6–10 |
| 17 | April 27 | Cubs | 3–2 | **Rhoden** (2–2) | Rainey | **Tekulve** (2) | 9,057 | 7–10 |
| 18 | April 28 | Cubs | 1–7 | Sanderson | **McWilliams** (0–3) | — | 17,317 | 7–11 |
| 19 | April 29 | Cubs | 1–2 | Trout | **Candelaria** (3–2) | Smith | 13,397 | 7–12 |
| 20 | April 30 | Cardinals | 3–5 | Sutter | **Tunnell** (0–2) | — | 4,097 | 7–13 |

May: 12–13 (Home: 9–7; Away: 3–6)

| # | Date | Opponent | Score | Win | Loss | Save | Attendance | Record |
|---|---|---|---|---|---|---|---|---|
| 21 | May 1 | Cardinals | 5–10 | Andujar | **DeLeon** (1–1) | — | 3,762 | 7–14 |
| 22 | May 2 | Cardinals | 1–3 | LaPoint | **Rhoden** (2–3) | Sutter | 3,649 | 7–15 |
| 23 | May 5 | Dodgers | 8–7 (10) | **Tekulve** (1–1) | Hershiser | — | 18,176 | 8–15 |
| 24 | May 6 | Dodgers | 4–6 (10) | Niedenfuer | **Tekulve** (1–2) | — | | 8–16 |
| 25 | May 6 | Dodgers | 2–1 | **Tudor** (2–1) | Valenzuela | — | 19,246 | 9–16 |
| 26 | May 10 | Giants | 4–2 | **Rhoden** (3–3) | Robinson | **Tekulve** (3) | 4,002 | 10–16 |
| 27 | May 11 | @ Braves | 2–4 (10) | Forster | **Tekulve** (1–3) | — | 24,586 | 10–17 |
| 28 | May 12 | @ Braves | 3–4 | Perez | **Guante** (0–2) | Dedmon | 41,319 | 10–18 |
| 29 | May 13 | @ Braves | 8–9 (10) | Dedmon | **Candelaria** (3–3) | — | 23,035 | 10–19 |
| 30 | May 14 | Astros | 3–2 | **DeLeon** (2–1) | Knepper | **Tekulve** (4) | 3,790 | 11–19 |
| 31 | May 15 | Astros | 3–2 (10) | **Guante** (1–2) | DiPino | — | 2,978 | 12–19 |
| 32 | May 16 | Astros | 0–1 | Ryan | **Candelaria** (3–4) | — | 4,523 | 12–20 |
| 33 | May 18 | Braves | 6–0 | **McWilliams** (1–3) | Falcone | — | 10,947 | 13–20 |
| 34 | May 19 | Braves | 2–4 (7) | Mahler | **Tudor** (2–2) | — | 11,989 | 13–21 |
| 35 | May 20 | Braves | 1–5 | Bedrosian | **Tekulve** (1–4) | — | 16,412 | 13–22 |
| 36 | May 22 | Reds | 3–5 | Soto | **Scurry** (0–2) | — | 7,959 | 13–23 |
| 37 | May 23 | Reds | 7–2 | **Candelaria** (4–4) | Russell | — | 7,072 | 14–23 |
| 38 | May 24 | Reds | 5–1 | **McWilliams** (2–3) | Price | — | 8,580 | 15–23 |
| 39 | May 25 | @ Astros | 6–2 | **Tudor** (3–2) | Scott | — | 18,430 | 16–23 |
| 40 | May 26 | @ Astros | 0–2 | Ryan | **DeLeon** (2–2) | — | 39,518 | 16–24 |
| 41 | May 27 | @ Astros | 2–1 | **Rhoden** (4–3) | Niekro | **Scurry** (1) | 18,416 | 17–24 |
| 42 | May 28 | @ Astros | 7–0 | **Candelaria** (5–4) | Ruhle | **Robinson** (4) | 10,952 | 18–24 |
| 43 | May 29 | @ Reds | 4–5 (10) | Power | **Tekulve** (1–5) | — | 10,411 | 18–25 |
| 44 | May 30 | @ Reds | 4–6 (14) | Owchinko | **Robinson** (0–1) | — | 11,608 | 18–26 |
| 45 | May 31 | Expos | 2–1 | **DeLeon** (3–2) | Gullickson | — | 6,049 | 19–26 |

June: 11–20 (Home: 6–7; Away: 5–13)

| # | Date | Opponent | Score | Win | Loss | Save | Attendance | Record |
|---|---|---|---|---|---|---|---|---|
| 46 | June 1 | Expos | 0–2 | Lea | **Rhoden** (4–4) | Reardon | 12,691 | 19–27 |
| 47 | June 2 | Expos | 2–1 | **Tunnell** (1–2) | Rogers | **Tekulve** (5) | 19,080 | 20–27 |
| 48 | June 3 | Expos | 4–0 | **Tudor** (4–2) | Palmer | — | 19,713 | 21–27 |
| 49 | June 4 | Mets | 2–4 | Darling | **Robinson** (0–2) | Orosco | 13,306 | 21–28 |
| 50 | June 5 | Mets | 0–3 | Terrell | **DeLeon** (3–3) | — | 6,539 | 21–29 |
| 51 | June 6 | Mets | 1–2 (13) | Gorman | **Scurry** (0–3) | — | 7,493 | 21–30 |
| 52 | June 8 | @ Phillies | 4–5 | Koosman | **Candelaria** (5–5) | Holland | | 21–31 |
| 53 | June 8 | @ Phillies | 1–2 | Gross | **McWilliams** (2–4) | Holland | 31,133 | 21–32 |
| 54 | June 9 | @ Phillies | 5–6 | Carlton | **Tudor** (4–3) | Holland | 31,981 | 21–33 |
| 55 | June 10 | @ Phillies | 12–6 (12) | **Guante** (2–2) | Kern | — | 32,996 | 22–33 |
| 56 | June 11 | @ Mets | 1–3 | Gooden | **Rhoden** (4–5) | Orosco | 19,596 | 22–34 |
| 57 | June 12 | @ Mets | 6–3 | **McWilliams** (3–4) | Leary | **Scurry** (2) | 14,255 | 23–34 |
| 58 | June 13 | @ Mets | 0–2 | Lynch | **Tunnell** (1–3) | Sisk | 12,124 | 23–35 |
| 59 | June 14 | @ Expos | 3–2 | **Tekulve** (2–5) | Lucas | — | 30,657 | 24–35 |
| 60 | June 15 | @ Expos | 0–1 | Schatzeder | **DeLeon** (3–4) | James | 23,247 | 24–36 |
| 61 | June 16 | @ Expos | 2–3 (11) | Reardon | **Tekulve** (2–6) | — | 24,626 | 24–37 |
| 62 | June 17 | @ Expos | 3–5 | Lea | **McWilliams** (3–5) | Reardon | 31,216 | 24–38 |
| 63 | June 19 | Cubs | 3–4 | Sutcliffe | **Tudor** (4–4) | Smith | 9,377 | 24–39 |
| 64 | June 20 | Cubs | 5–1 | **DeLeon** (4–4) | Rainey | — | 7,767 | 25–39 |
| 65 | June 21 | Cubs | 8–6 | **Rhoden** (5–5) | Eckersley | **Tekulve** (6) | 8,267 | 26–39 |
| 66 | June 22 | Phillies | 10–3 | **McWilliams** (4–5) | Bystrom | — | | 27–39 |
| 67 | June 22 | Phillies | 7–6 (13) | **Scurry** (1–3) | Campbell | — | 20,516 | 28–39 |
| 68 | June 23 | Phillies | 5–7 | Koosman | **Candelaria** (5–6) | — | 19,014 | 28–40 |
| 69 | June 24 | Phillies | 2–4 | Carlton | **Tudor** (4–5) | Holland | 17,749 | 28–41 |
| 70 | June 25 | @ Cubs | 3–0 | **DeLeon** (5–4) | Rainey | — | 19,036 | 29–41 |
| 71 | June 26 | @ Cubs | 9–0 | **Rhoden** (6–5) | Eckersley | — | | 30–41 |
| 72 | June 26 | @ Cubs | 8–9 | Bordi | **McWilliams** (4–6) | Smith | 28,369 | 30–42 |
| 73 | June 27 | @ Cubs | 7–8 (11) | Stoddard | **Scurry** (1–4) | — | 37,055 | 30–43 |
| 74 | June 28 | @ Giants | 3–4 (11) | Lavelle | **Robinson** (0–3) | — | 6,191 | 30–44 |
| 75 | June 29 | @ Giants | 0–3 | Robinson | **Tudor** (4–6) | — | 15,448 | 30–45 |
| 76 | June 30 | @ Giants | 5–7 | Williams | **Guante** (2–3) | Lavelle | 26,990 | 30–46 |

July: 15–15 (Home: 11–8; Away: 4–7)

| # | Date | Opponent | Score | Win | Loss | Save | Attendance | Record |
|---|---|---|---|---|---|---|---|---|
| 77 | July 1 | @ Giants | 4–7 | Hammaker | **Rhoden** (6–6) | Minton | 15,731 | 30–47 |
| 78 | July 2 | @ Dodgers | 4–5 | Pena | **McWilliams** (4–7) | Niedenfuer | 28,986 | 30–48 |
| 79 | July 3 | @ Dodgers | 6–0 | **Candelaria** (6–6) | Howell | — | 37,951 | 31–48 |
| 80 | July 4 | @ Dodgers | 0–9 | Hershiser | **Tudor** (4–7) | — | 46,747 | 31–49 |
| 81 | July 5 | @ Padres | 1–2 | Gossage | **Scurry** (1–5) | — | 14,907 | 31–50 |
| 82 | July 6 | @ Padres | 3–7 | Whitson | **Rhoden** (6–7) | — | 18,368 | 31–51 |
| 83 | July 7 | @ Padres | 0–1 | Dravecky | **McWilliams** (4–8) | Gossage | 28,995 | 31–52 |
| 84 | July 8 | @ Padres | 4–3 | **Candelaria** (7–6) | Thurmond | **Tekulve** (7) | 17,950 | 32–52 |
| 85 | July 12 | Giants | 6–3 | **DeLeon** (6–4) | Laskey | **Tekulve** (8) | 6,295 | 33–52 |
| 86 | July 13 | Giants | 8–2 | **Candelaria** (8–6) | Krukow | — | | 34–52 |
| 87 | July 13 | Giants | 4–3 (18) | **Scurry** (2–5) | Cornell | — | 22,167 | 35–52 |
| 88 | July 14 | Giants | 6–2 | **Rhoden** (7–7) | Davis | — | 9,001 | 36–52 |
| 89 | July 15 | Giants | 9–3 | **Tudor** (5–7) | Robinson | — | 13,078 | 37–52 |
| 90 | July 16 | Dodgers | 4–1 | **Walk** (1–0) | Honeycutt | — | 9,044 | 38–52 |
| 91 | July 17 | Dodgers | 0–5 | Pena | **DeLeon** (6–5) | — | 10,134 | 38–53 |
| 92 | July 18 | Dodgers | 5–2 | **McWilliams** (5–8) | Reuss | — | 13,473 | 39–53 |
| 93 | July 19 | Padres | 5–1 | **Candelaria** (9–6) | Lollar | — | 10,048 | 40–53 |
| 94 | July 20 | Padres | 4–3 | **Rhoden** (8–7) | Dravecky | **Robinson** (5) | | 41–53 |
| 95 | July 20 | Padres | 2–3 | Hawkins | **Tudor** (5–8) | Gossage | 18,007 | 41–54 |
| 96 | July 21 | Padres | 4–6 | Thurmond | **Walk** (1–1) | Gossage | 11,593 | 41–55 |
| 97 | July 22 | Padres | 1–5 | Whitson | **DeLeon** (6–6) | — | | 41–56 |
| 98 | July 22 | Padres | 3–2 (11) | **Winn** (1–0) | Gossage | — | 22,971 | 42–56 |
| 99 | July 24 | @ Expos | 12–5 (11) | **Scurry** (3–5) | Reardon | — | 28,087 | 43–56 |
| 100 | July 25 | @ Expos | 3–1 | **Rhoden** (9–7) | Lea | **Robinson** (6) | 28,266 | 44–56 |
| 101 | July 26 | @ Expos | 4–5 | James | **Robinson** (0–4) | Reardon | 17,685 | 44–57 |
| 102 | July 27 | Cardinals | 2–3 (10) | Andujar | **Tekulve** (2–7) | Sutter | 9,740 | 44–58 |
| 103 | July 28 | Cardinals | 1–5 | Cox | **DeLeon** (6–7) | Sutter | 12,945 | 44–59 |
| 104 | July 29 | Cardinals | 3–4 | Allen | **Candelaria** (9–7) | Sutter | 12,501 | 44–60 |
| 105 | July 30 | Expos | 1–3 | James | **Rhoden** (9–8) | — | 6,212 | 44–61 |
| 106 | July 31 | Expos | 5–3 | **Tudor** (6–8) | Rogers | **Robinson** (7) | 7,813 | 45–61 |

August: 13–15 (Home: 6–8; Away: 7–7)

| # | Date | Opponent | Score | Win | Loss | Save | Attendance | Record |
|---|---|---|---|---|---|---|---|---|
| 107 | August 1 | Expos | 4–0 | **McWilliams** (6–8) | Lea | — | 8,729 | 46–61 |
| 108 | August 2 | Mets | 6–4 | **Robinson** (1–4) | Darling | — | 8,543 | 47–61 |
| 109 | August 3 | Mets | 1–4 | Terrell | **Candelaria** (9–8) | — | 7,783 | 47–62 |
| 110 | August 4 | Mets | 3–4 | Gorman | **Scurry** (3–6) | Orosco | 7,876 | 47–63 |
| 111 | August 5 | Mets | 1–3 (10) | Gardner | **Robinson** (1–5) | — | 10,575 | 47–64 |
| 112 | August 6 | @ Cardinals | 3–2 | **McWilliams** (7–8) | Andujar | **Tekulve** (9) | 22,142 | 48–64 |
| 113 | August 7 | @ Cardinals | 1–2 | Cox | **DeLeon** (6–8) | Sutter | 18,146 | 48–65 |
| 114 | August 8 | @ Cardinals | 6–4 | **Candelaria** (10–8) | Horton | **Tunnell** (1) | 18,325 | 49–65 |
| 115 | August 9 | @ Mets | 11–0 | **Rhoden** (10–8) | Berenyi | — | 27,604 | 50–65 |
| 116 | August 10 | @ Mets | 4–1 | **Tudor** (7–8) | Fernandez | **Tekulve** (10) | 28,355 | 51–65 |
| 117 | August 11 | @ Mets | 1–3 | Gooden | **McWilliams** (7–9) | Orosco | 28,326 | 51–66 |
| 118 | August 12 | @ Mets | 3–6 | Darling | **DeLeon** (6–9) | Gardner | 36,135 | 51–67 |
| 119 | August 14 | @ Braves | 1–3 | Camp | **Candelaria** (10–9) | Moore | 14,243 | 51–68 |
| 120 | August 15 | @ Braves | 3–7 | Bedrosian | **Rhoden** (10–9) | Garber | 12,957 | 51–69 |
| 121 | August 16 | @ Braves | 5–2 | **Tudor** (8–8) | Mahler | — | 16,829 | 52–69 |
| 122 | August 17 | Astros | 4–7 (10) | Dawley | **Tekulve** (2–8) | — | 10,370 | 52–70 |
| 123 | August 18 | Astros | 0–5 | LaCoss | **DeLeon** (6–10) | — | 11,691 | 52–71 |
| 124 | August 19 | Astros | 3–4 | Niekro | **Candelaria** (10–10) | Dawley | 13,215 | 52–72 |
| 125 | August 20 | Braves | 1–4 (10) | Garber | **Tekulve** (2–9) | — | 7,613 | 52–73 |
| 126 | August 21 | Braves | 5–4 | **Robinson** (2–5) | Dedmon | — | 6,400 | 53–73 |
| 127 | August 22 | Braves | 7–2 | **McWilliams** (8–9) | Payne | — | 4,156 | 54–73 |
| 128 | August 24 | Reds | 0–2 | Russell | **DeLeon** (6–11) | — | 8,074 | 54–74 |
| 129 | August 25 | Reds | 5–3 | **Candelaria** (11–10) | Tibbs | **McWilliams** (1) | 21,385 | 55–74 |
| 130 | August 26 | Reds | 7–1 | **Rhoden** (11–9) | Price | — | 10,831 | 56–74 |
| 131 | August 28 | @ Astros | 2–3 | Smith | **Tudor** (8–9) | — | 11,016 | 56–75 |
| 132 | August 29 | @ Astros | 4–2 | **Robinson** (3–5) | DiPino | — | 9,587 | 57–75 |
| 133 | August 30 | @ Reds | 1–4 | Tibbs | **DeLeon** (6–12) | — | 10,220 | 57–76 |
| 134 | August 31 | @ Reds | 6–2 | **Candelaria** (12–10) | Price | **Robinson** (8) | 12,954 | 58–76 |

September: 17–11 (Home: 7–6; Away: 10–5)

| # | Date | Opponent | Score | Win | Loss | Save | Attendance | Record |
|---|---|---|---|---|---|---|---|---|
| 135 | September 1 | @ Reds | 5–7 (11) | Power | **Robinson** (3–6) | — | 16,733 | 58–77 |
| 136 | September 2 | @ Reds | 1–7 | Robinson | **Tudor** (8–10) | — | 13,597 | 58–78 |
| 137 | September 3 | @ Expos | 3–0 | **McWilliams** (9–9) | Rogers | **Tekulve** (11) | 12,333 | 59–78 |
| 138 | September 4 | @ Expos | 5–3 | **Scurry** (4–6) | James | **Tekulve** (12) | 10,184 | 60–78 |
| 139 | September 5 | Mets | 2–4 | Berenyi | **Tunnell** (1–4) | Sisk | 3,569 | 60–79 |
| 140 | September 6 | Mets | 2–0 | **Rhoden** (12–9) | Schiraldi | **Scurry** (3) | 3,529 | 61–79 |
| 141 | September 7 | Cardinals | 4–1 | **Tudor** (9–10) | Horton | **Scurry** (4) | 4,077 | 62–79 |
| 142 | September 8 | Cardinals | 2–9 | Andujar | **McWilliams** (9–10) | — | 8,807 | 62–80 |
| 143 | September 9 | Cardinals | 1–2 | Cox | **DeLeon** (6–13) | Sutter | 7,460 | 62–81 |
| 144 | September 10 | Expos | 5–8 | Grapenthin | **Tunnell** (1–5) | Hesketh | 3,126 | 62–82 |
| 145 | September 11 | Expos | 5–1 | **Rhoden** (13–9) | Bargar | — | 2,963 | 63–82 |
| 146 | September 12 | @ Mets | 0–2 | Gooden | **Tudor** (9–11) | — | 12,876 | 63–83 |
| 147 | September 13 | @ Mets | 14–4 | **McWilliams** (10–10) | Terrell | — | 6,076 | 64–83 |
| 148 | September 14 | @ Cardinals | 8–7 (12) | **Robinson** (4–6) | Sutter | **Tekulve** (13) | 16,292 | 65–83 |
| 149 | September 15 | @ Cardinals | 3–8 | LaPoint | **Candelaria** (12–11) | — | 17,356 | 65–84 |
| 150 | September 16 | @ Cardinals | 7–8 (10) | Hassler | **Tunnell** (1–6) | — | 21,918 | 65–85 |
| 151 | September 18 | @ Cubs | 6–2 | **Tudor** (10–11) | Eckersley | **Robinson** (9) | 30,721 | 66–85 |
| 152 | September 19 | @ Cubs | 11–6 | **McWilliams** (11–10) | Stoddard | **Winn** (1) | 31,585 | 67–85 |
| 153 | September 20 | @ Cubs | 7–6 | **Tekulve** (3–9) | Smith | **Candelaria** (1) | 33,651 | 68–85 |
| 154 | September 21 | Phillies | 5–1 | **Scurry** (5–6) | Koosman | — | 4,940 | 69–85 |
| 155 | September 22 | Phillies | 2–1 (12) | **Robinson** (5–6) | Andersen | — | 6,927 | 70–85 |
| 156 | September 23 | Phillies | 4–2 | **Tudor** (11–11) | Rawley | **Candelaria** (2) | 11,249 | 71–85 |
| 157 | September 24 | Cubs | 1–4 | Sutcliffe | **McWilliams** (11–11) | — | 5,472 | 71–86 |
| 158 | September 25 | Cubs | 7–1 | **DeLeon** (7–13) | Patterson | — | 4,068 | 72–86 |
| 159 | September 26 | Cubs | 2–5 | Ruthven | **Tunnell** (1–7) | — | 3,365 | 72–87 |
| 160 | September 29 | @ Phillies | 4–0 | **Rhoden** (14–9) | Hudson | — | 27,493 | 73–87 |
| 161 | September 30 | @ Phillies | 2–0 | **Tudor** (12–11) | Denny | **Robinson** (10) | | 74–87 |
| 162 | September 30 | @ Phillies | 7–2 | **McWilliams** (12–11) | Rawley | — | 17,292 | 75–87 |

Legend: = Win = Loss
Bold = Pirates team member

== Roster ==
1984 Pittsburgh Pirates
Roster
| Pitchers: 34 Mike Bielecki; 45 John Candelaria; 25 José DeLeón; 35 Chris Green; 47 Cecilio Guante; 61 Ray Krawczyk; 49 Larry McWilliams; 26 Alfonso Pulido; 29 Rick Rhoden; 43 Don Robinson; 19 Rod Scurry; 27 Kent Tekulve; 24 John Tudor; 22 Lee Tunnell; 18 Bob Walk; 41 Jim Winn; 44 Jeff Zaske | Catchers: 14 Milt May; 6 Tony Peña; Infielders: 37 Rafael Belliard; 4 Dale Berra; 28 Denny González; 5 Bill Madlock; 2 Jim Morrison; 3 Johnny Ray; 30 Jason Thompson; 50 Eddie Vargas; 15 Ron Wotus | Outfielders: 10 Benny Distefano; 51 Doug Frobel; 12 Brian Harper; 17 Lee Lacy; 16 Lee Mazzilli; 11 Joe Orsulak; 26 Amos Otis; 39 Mitchell Page; 36 Marvell Wynne | Manager: 7 Chuck Tanner; Coaches: 31 Harvey Haddix (pitching); 23 Grant Jackson (bullpen); 32 Joe Lonnett (third base); 42 Alex Monchak (first base); 55 Rick Peterson (bullpen); 48 Bob Skinner (hitting) |

=== Opening Day lineup ===
Opening Day Starters
| # | Name | Position |
|---|---|---|
| 36 | Marvell Wynne | CF |
| 3 | Johnny Ray | 2B |
| 5 | Bill Madlock | 3B |
| 30 | Jason Thompson | 1B |
| 26 | Amos Otis | LF |
| 6 | Tony Peña | C |
| 51 | Doug Frobel | RF |
| 4 | Dale Berra | SS |
| 29 | Rick Rhoden | SP |

== Player stats ==
Batting

Note: G = Games played; AB = At bats; H = Hits; Avg. = Batting average; HR = Home runs; RBI = Runs batted in

Regular season
| Player | G | AB | H | Avg. | HR | RBI |
|---|---|---|---|---|---|---|
| M. Page | 16 | 12 | 4 | 0.333 | 0 | 0 |
| R. Rhoden | 35 | 84 | 28 | 0.333 | 0 | 4 |
| L. Lacy | 138 | 474 | 152 | 0.321 | 12 | 70 |
| J. Ray | 155 | 555 | 173 | 0.312 | 6 | 67 |
| D. Robinson | 53 | 31 | 9 | 0.290 | 1 | 5 |
| J. Morrison | 100 | 304 | 87 | 0.286 | 11 | 45 |
| T. Peña | 147 | 546 | 156 | 0.286 | 15 | 78 |
| M. Wynne | 154 | 653 | 174 | 0.266 | 0 | 39 |
| B. Harper | 46 | 112 | 29 | 0.259 | 2 | 11 |
| J. Thompson | 154 | 543 | 138 | 0.254 | 17 | 74 |
| J. Orsulak | 32 | 67 | 17 | 0.254 | 0 | 3 |
| B. Madlock | 103 | 403 | 102 | 0.253 | 4 | 44 |
| L. Mazzilli | 111 | 266 | 63 | 0.237 | 4 | 21 |
| R. Belliard | 20 | 22 | 5 | 0.227 | 0 | 0 |
| E. Vargas | 18 | 31 | 7 | 0.226 | 0 | 2 |
| D. Berra | 136 | 450 | 100 | 0.222 | 9 | 52 |
| R. Wotus | 27 | 55 | 12 | 0.218 | 0 | 2 |
| J. Tudor | 36 | 76 | 16 | 0.211 | 0 | 2 |
| D. Frobel | 126 | 276 | 56 | 0.203 | 12 | 28 |
| D. González | 26 | 82 | 15 | 0.183 | 0 | 4 |
| M. May | 50 | 96 | 17 | 0.177 | 1 | 8 |
| B. Distefano | 45 | 78 | 13 | 0.167 | 3 | 9 |
| A. Otis | 40 | 97 | 16 | 0.165 | 0 | 10 |
| J. Candelaria | 33 | 62 | 8 | 0.129 | 1 | 2 |
| L. McWilliams | 36 | 74 | 9 | 0.122 | 0 | 4 |
| J. DeLeón | 30 | 59 | 5 | 0.085 | 0 | 2 |
| L. Tunnell | 26 | 12 | 1 | 0.083 | 0 | 0 |
| C. Guante | 27 | 4 | 0 | 0.000 | 0 | 0 |
| R. Scurry | 43 | 2 | 0 | 0.000 | 0 | 0 |
| K. Tekulve | 72 | 7 | 0 | 0.000 | 0 | 0 |
| B. Walk | 2 | 3 | 0 | 0.000 | 0 | 0 |
| J. Winn | 9 | 1 | 0 | 0.000 | 0 | 0 |
| M. Bielecki | 4 | 0 | 0 | — | 0 | 0 |
| C. Green | 4 | 0 | 0 | — | 0 | 0 |
| R. Krawczyk | 4 | 0 | 0 | — | 0 | 0 |
| A. Pulido | 1 | 0 | 0 | — | 0 | 0 |
| J. Zaske | 3 | 0 | 0 | — | 0 | 0 |
| Team totals | 162 | 5,537 | 1,412 | 0.255 | 98 | 586 |

Pitching

Note: G = Games pitched; IP = Innings pitched; W = Wins; L = Losses; ERA = Earned run average; SO = Strikeouts

Regular season
| Player | G | IP | W | L | ERA | SO |
|---|---|---|---|---|---|---|
| M. Bielecki | 4 | 4 1/3 | 0 | 0 | 0.00 | 1 |
| J. Zaske | 3 | 5 | 0 | 0 | 0.00 | 2 |
| R. Scurry | 43 | 46 1/3 | 5 | 6 | 2.53 | 48 |
| C. Guante | 27 | 41 1/3 | 2 | 3 | 2.61 | 30 |
| B. Walk | 2 | 10 1/3 | 1 | 1 | 2.61 | 10 |
| K. Tekulve | 72 | 88 | 3 | 9 | 2.66 | 36 |
| R. Rhoden | 33 | 238 1/3 | 14 | 9 | 2.72 | 136 |
| J. Candelaria | 33 | 185 1/3 | 12 | 11 | 2.72 | 133 |
| L. McWilliams | 34 | 227 1/3 | 12 | 11 | 2.93 | 149 |
| D. Robinson | 51 | 122 | 5 | 6 | 3.02 | 110 |
| J. Tudor | 32 | 212 | 12 | 11 | 3.27 | 117 |
| R. Krawczyk | 4 | 5 1/3 | 0 | 0 | 3.38 | 3 |
| J. DeLeón | 30 | 192 1/3 | 7 | 13 | 3.74 | 153 |
| J. Winn | 9 | 18 2/3 | 1 | 0 | 3.86 | 11 |
| L. Tunnell | 26 | 68 1/3 | 1 | 7 | 5.27 | 51 |
| C. Green | 4 | 3 | 0 | 0 | 6.00 | 3 |
| A. Pulido | 1 | 2 | 0 | 0 | 9.00 | 2 |
| Team totals | 162 | 1470 | 75 | 87 | 3.11 | 995 |

== Awards and honors ==
- Don Robinson, Hutch Award

1984 Major League Baseball All-Star Game

- Tony Peña, C, reserve

== Transactions ==
- November 7, 1983 – Jim Bibby granted free agency.
- November 7, 1983 – Miguel Diloné granted free agency.
- November 7, 1983 – Richie Hebner granted free agency.
- November 7, 1983 – Dave Parker granted free agency.
- November 7, 1983 – Kent Tekulve granted free agency.
- November 7, 1983 – Dave Tomlin granted free agency.
- November 12, 1983 – Sold Bob Owchinko to the Cincinnati Reds.
- November 22, 1983 – Signed Jeff Little as a free agent.
- November 22, 1983 – Signed Andy Rincon as a free agent.
- December 6, 1983 – Traded Mike Easler to the Boston Red Sox. Received John Tudor.
- December 19, 1983 – Signed Amos Otis as a free agent.
- December 22, 1983 – Signed Kent Tekulve as a free agent.
- January 12, 1984 – Signed Dave Tomlin as a free agent.
- January 17, 1984 – Drafted Gil Heredia in the 1st round (16th pick) of the 1984 amateur draft (January), but did not sign the player.
- January 17, 1984 – Drafted Jay Buhner in the 2nd round of the 1984 amateur draft (January Secondary). Player signed May 26, 1984.
- January 17, 1984 – Drafted Tom Prince in the 4th round of the 1984 amateur draft (January Secondary). Player signed May 24, 1984.
- January 17, 1984 – Drafted Alex Cole in the 11th round of the 1984 amateur draft (January), but did not sign the player.
- February 1, 1984 – Signed Joe Charboneau as a free agent.
- March 4, 1984 – Signed Jim Neidlinger as an amateur free agent.
- March 28, 1984 – Signed Kelly Paris as a free agent.
- March 31, 1984 – Released Gene Tenace.
- April 3, 1984 – Signed Bob Walk as a free agent.
- May 19, 1984 – Signed Mitchell Page as a free agent.
- June 4, 1984 – Drafted Eric Hetzel in the 1st round (13th pick) of the 1984 amateur draft (June Secondary), but did not sign the player.
- June 4, 1984 – Drafted Barry Jones in the 3rd round of the 1984 amateur draft.
- June 4, 1984 – Drafted Wes Chamberlain in the 5th round of the 1984 amateur draft, but did not sign the player.
- June 4, 1984 – Drafted Gordon Dillard in the 7th round of the 1984 amateur draft (June Secondary), but did not sign the player.
- June 4, 1984 – Drafted Stu Cole in the 19th round of the 1984 amateur draft, but did not sign the player.
- June 21, 1984 – Signed Hipolito Pena as a free agent.
- August 5, 1984 – Released Amos Otis.

== Farm system ==
| Level | Team | League | Manager |
|---|---|---|---|
| AAA | Hawaii Islanders | Pacific Coast League | Tommy Sandt |
| AA | Nashua Pirates | Eastern League | Bill Scripture |
| A | Prince William Pirates | Carolina League | Johnny Lipon |
| A | Macon Pirates | South Atlantic League | Joe Frisina |
| A-Short Season | Watertown Pirates | New York–Penn League | Bill Bryk |
| Rookie | GCL Pirates | Gulf Coast League | Woody Huyke |
