= Major League Baseball scandals =

There have been many dramatic on-and-off-field moments in over 130 years of Major League Baseball:

== Gambling scandals ==
Baseball had frequent problems with gamblers influencing the game, until the 1920s when the Black Sox Scandal and the resultant merciless crackdown largely put an end to it. The scandal involved eight players and all were suspended for life.

=== 1877 Louisville Grays scandal ===
After a losing streak towards the end of the season cost the Louisville Grays the pennant, members of the team were discovered to have thrown games for money. Four players, including star pitcher Jim Devlin, were banned from professional baseball for life.

=== 1908 bribery attempt ===
On the eve of the "playoff" or "makeup" game between the Chicago Cubs and the New York Giants that would decide the National League championship, an umpire refused an attempted bribe intended to help the Giants win. The Giants lost to the Cubs, and the matter was kept fairly quiet. It came out the following spring, but the results of the official inquiry were kept secret. However, the Giants' team physician for 1908 was reportedly the culprit and was banned for life.

Recent research has suggested that the team physician was allowed to be the "scapegoat"; some baseball historians now suspect that the Giants' manager, John McGraw, was behind the physician's bribe attempt, or that it may in fact have been McGraw himself who approached the umpire. If true, and had it become known, it could have been disastrous, as McGraw was such a prominent figure in the game.

=== 1914 World Series upset ===
The four-game sweep of the Philadelphia Athletics by the Boston Braves in the 1914 World Series was stunning. Students of that Series suspect that the Athletics were angry at their notoriously miserly owner, Connie Mack, and that the A's players did not give the Series their best effort. Although such an allegation was never proven, Mack apparently thought that it was at least a strong possibility, and he soon traded or sold all of the stars away from that 1914 team. The A's team was decimated, and within two years they limped to the worst single-season win-loss percentage in modern baseball history (36-117, .235); it would be over a decade before they recovered.

=== 1917–1918 suspicions ===
The manner in which the New York Giants lost to the Chicago White Sox in the 1917 World Series raised some suspicions. A key play in the final game involved Heinie Zimmerman chasing Eddie Collins across an unguarded home plate. Immediately afterward, Zimmerman (who had also hit only .120 during the Series) denied throwing the game or the Series. Within two years, Zimmerman and his corrupt teammate Hal Chase would be suspended for life, not so much due to any one incident but to a series of questionable actions and associations. The fact that the question of throwing the Series was even raised suggests the level of public consciousness of gamblers' potential influence on the game.

Then, just a year ahead of the infamous Black Sox scandal, there were rumors of World Series fixing by members of the Chicago Cubs. The Cubs lost the 1918 Series in a sparsely-attended affair that also nearly resulted in a players' strike demanding more than the normal gate receipts. With World War I dominating the news (as well as having shortened the regular baseball season and having caused attendance to shrink) the unsubstantiated rumors were allowed to dissipate.

=== 1919 conspiracy ===
The 1919 World Series resulted in the most famous scandal in baseball history, often referred to as the Black Sox Scandal. Eight players from the Chicago White Sox (nicknamed the Black Sox) were accused of throwing the series against the Cincinnati Reds.

Details of the scandal remain controversial, and the extent to which each player was said to be involved varied. It was, however, front-page news across the country when the story was uncovered late in the 1920 season, and despite being acquitted of criminal charges (throwing baseball games was technically not a crime), the eight players were banned from organized baseball (i.e. the leagues subject to the National Agreement) for life.

Although betting had been an ongoing problem in baseball since the 1870s, it reached a head in this scandal, resulting in radical changes in the game's organization. It resulted in the dissolution of the National Baseball Commission and the appointment of a Commissioner of Baseball (Kenesaw Mountain Landis) who took firm steps to try to rid the game of gambling influence permanently.

One important step was the lifetime ban against the Black Sox Scandal participants. The "eight men out" were the great "natural hitter" "Shoeless" Joe Jackson; pitchers Eddie Cicotte and "Lefty" Williams; infielders "Buck" Weaver, "Chick" Gandil, Fred McMullin, and "Swede" Risberg; and outfielder "Happy" Felsch. Jackson, who was suspended during the peak of his career with a .356 lifetime batting average (all-time third), is still regarded as one of the greatest players not in the Hall of Fame.

==== 1919 aftermath ====
After the 1919 scandal and some further game-fixing incidents in 1920 had been resolved, and with Landis having taken over, the gambling problem apparently went away, for the most part, for decades. Commissioners have taken an almost fanatical interest in the subject, suspending well-known individuals for lengthy times just for having been seen with gamblers; Leo Durocher, manager of the Brooklyn Dodgers, was suspended by Commissioner Happy Chandler for the 1947 season for just that reason.

After their retirement, Mickey Mantle and Willie Mays served for a while as greeters at legal Atlantic City gambling casinos. Commissioner Bowie Kuhn issued a ban against them. New Jersey state gaming regulators harshly criticized Kuhn's decision, while newspaper articles of the time pointed out that Mantle and Mays played before there were large player salaries. Their bans were lifted during Commissioner Peter Ueberroth's term.

=== 1980s Pete Rose betting scandal ===
In March 1989, Pete Rose, baseball's all-time hits leader and manager of the Cincinnati Reds since 1984, was reported by Sports Illustrated as betting on Major League games, including Reds games, while he was the manager.

Rose had been questioned about his gambling activities in February 1989 by outgoing commissioner Peter Ueberroth and his successor, National League president A. Bartlett Giamatti. Three days later, lawyer John M. Dowd was retained to investigate the charges against Rose. During the investigation, Giamatti took office as the commissioner of baseball.

The Dowd Report asserted that Pete Rose bet on 52 Reds games in 1987, at a minimum of $10,000 a day.

Rose, facing a very harsh punishment, along with his attorney and agent, Reuven Katz, decided to seek a compromise with Major League Baseball. On August 24, 1989, Rose agreed to a voluntary lifetime ban from baseball. The agreement had three key provisions:

1. Major League Baseball would make no finding of fact regarding gambling allegations and cease their investigation;
2. Rose was neither admitting nor denying the charges; and
3. Rose could apply for reinstatement after one year.

Despite the "no finding of fact" provision, Giamatti immediately stated publicly that he felt that Rose bet on baseball games. Eight days later, September 1, Giamatti suffered a fatal heart attack and was replaced by his deputy, Fay Vincent. After his retirement, Vincent stated that he and Giamatti believed that Rose could only be reinstated if he publicly showed remorse.

Bud Selig, the former owner of the Milwaukee Brewers, succeeded Vincent in 1992. Rose applied for reinstatement twice: in September 1997 and March 2003. In both instances, commissioner Selig chose not to act, thereby keeping the ban intact. Upon Selig's retirement from the Commissioner's Office, Rose applied for reinstatement in March 2015, but Selig's successor Rob Manfred denied the request in December of that year. Rose died on September 30, 2024, at the age of 83, at his home in Las Vegas, Nevada. Following his death, Rose's family filed a petition with MLB for his reinstatement. On May 13, 2025, Commissioner Rob Manfred removed Rose from MLB's permanently ineligible list, along with sixteen other deceased individuals who had previously been banned. Manfred ruled that permanent ineligibility concludes upon the death of the disciplined individual, making Rose eligible for Hall of Fame consideration for the first time. The Hall of Fame's chair, Jane Forbes Clark, confirmed that anyone removed from baseball's permanently ineligible list would become eligible for Hall of Fame consideration, with Rose's candidacy subject to a vote by the Classic Baseball Era Committee, which next convenes in December 2027.

On February 4, 1991, Rose's ban from baseball was extended to the Baseball Hall of Fame, when the twelve members of the board of directors of the Hall voted unanimously to bar Rose from the ballot. However, Major League Baseball allowed Rose to be a part of the All-Century Team celebration in 1999 since he was named one of the team's outfielders.

In 2004, after years of speculation and denial, Rose admitted in his book My Prison Without Bars that the accusations that he had bet on Reds games were true and that he had admitted it to Selig personally some time before. He stated that he always bet on the Reds, never against them. This claim, while never disproven, is irrelevant: the ban is absolute, regardless of whether the bettor is wagering for or against their own team. William D. Cox was banned for betting for his team, and being able to bet for one's own team raises player safety issues anyway, since players do not wish to risk injury mounting a comeback to save a poor bet.

== 1980s collusion ==
Repeatedly in the 1980s, MLB owners colluded to keep player salaries down. Over multiple instances the owners were found to have stolen nearly $400 million from the players. When the Major League Baseball players struck in 1994, the owners were found to have committed unfair labor practices in attempting to keep player salaries down again.

== Substance abuse ==
Baseball has had its share of problems with substance abuse from the inception. Prior to the 1970s, there were countless individual problems with alcohol abuse, but as alcohol was a legal substance during most of that time (except for the Prohibition era), alcohol was typically seen as a character weakness on the part of individuals. Public awareness of illegal drugs accelerated during the 1970s, and by the 1980s a number of players had become caught up.

=== 1985 cocaine scandal ===
Pittsburgh Pirates players Dave Parker, Dale Berra, Rod Scurry, Lee Mazzilli, Lee Lacy, and John Milner, as well as non-Pirates Willie Mays Aikens, Vida Blue, Enos Cabell, Keith Hernandez, Jeffrey Leonard, Tim Raines, and Lonnie Smith, were summoned to appear before a Pittsburgh grand jury. Their testimony led to the Pittsburgh Drug Trials, which made national headlines in September 1985.

The spotlight on the "Pittsburgh problem" by the national media led to the more widespread awareness of use of other drugs such as amphetamines ("greenies" in baseball vernacular) and marijuana in the game. Both have a long history in baseball; Milner (who had retired two years earlier due to recurring hamstring injuries), in fact, spoke of Willie Mays and Willie Stargell, both iconic figures and Baseball Hall of Famers, giving him "greenies".

Testimony revealed that drug dealers frequented the Pirates' clubhouse. Stories such as Rod Scurry leaving a game in the late innings to look for cocaine and John Milner buying two grams of cocaine for $200 in the bathroom stalls at Three Rivers Stadium during a 1980 game against the Houston Astros shocked the grand jurors. Even Kevin Koch, who played the Pirates' mascot, was implicated for buying cocaine and introducing players to a drug dealer. Ultimately, seven drug dealers pleaded guilty on various charges.

On February 28, 1986, Baseball Commissioner Peter Ueberroth suspended a number of players for varying lengths of time. A primary condition of reinstatement was public service. It would have also included urine tests, but the players union was able to successfully halt its implementation. To this day, drug testing, particularly of this sort, is a polarizing issue.

Rod Scurry died at age 36 on November 5, 1992 in a Reno, Nevada intensive care unit of a heart attack after a cocaine-fueled incident with police officers led to his hospitalization.

=== 2005–2006 steroids investigations ===
The steroids rumors and facts resulted in several de facto bans from the game by players who were either certifiable or suspected users of steroids, and significant doubt has been cast about the quality of various baseball records set since at least the early 1990s. Some people base their opinion on Jose Canseco's tell-all book Juiced: Wild Times, Rampant 'Roids, Smash Hits & How Baseball Got Big.

=== 2013 Biogenesis scandal ===
In 2013, twenty Major League Baseball (MLB) players were accused of using HGH after obtaining it from the clinic Biogenesis of America. Milwaukee Brewers star Ryan Braun, who had a drug-related suspension overturned in 2011, made a deal with MLB and accepted a 65-game ban. Two weeks later, New York Yankees star Alex Rodriguez was suspended through the 2014 season (211 games), and 12 other players were suspended for 50 games. It was the most players ever suspended at one time by MLB.

=== 2021 Spider Tack Scandal ===
The 2021 sticky stuff controversy arose in Major League Baseball (MLB) around pitchers' use of foreign substances, such as the resin-based Spider Tack, to improve their grip and spin rate on their pitches. On June 15, 2021, MLB announced a 10-game suspension for any player caught using foreign substances on baseballs, with umpire inspections of all pitchers starting on June 21, a decision that was met with mixed reactions from players and coaches.

== Sign stealing scandals ==
=== Houston Astros ===
In 2019, Mike Fiers of the Oakland Athletics spoke to Ken Rosenthal and Evan Drelich of The Athletic where he revealed the Astros had been electronically stealing signs since at least the 2017 season. After an investigation by MLB, Astros manager A. J. Hinch and general manager Jeff Luhnow were each suspended for one year from MLB. In addition, the Astros were fined $5 million and lost their first- and second-round draft picks for the 2020 and 2021 MLB drafts. After the news broke, Astros owner Jim Crane fired both Hinch and Lunhow. Hinch admitted to knowing about the scheme and discouraging it, but not reporting or stopping it. Both Carlos Beltrán and Alex Cora were also implicated in the report by MLB Commissioner Rob Manfred.

=== Boston Red Sox ===
The Boston Red Sox, managed by Cora beginning in the 2018 season, were also accused in a story on The Athletic of having their own sign stealing scheme. On January 14, 2020, Cora and the Red Sox agreed to "mutually part ways". In a statement after the news Cora said, "I do not want to be a distraction". The report on the Red Sox scheme was not released before the decision. Two days later, Beltrán and the New York Mets came to a similar parting of the ways; the Mets had hired him as the team's new manager less than three months earlier.

On April 22, 2020, MLB suspended Red Sox video replay system operator J.T. Watkins without pay through the 2020 postseason and stripped the team of its second-round draft pick this year after completing an investigation into allegations that Boston stole signs during the 2018 season. Alex Cora was also suspended through the 2020 postseason, but only for his conduct as Houston's bench coach.

== See also ==
- List of people banned from Major League Baseball
- Doping in baseball
- Game of Shadows
