= 1984 Philadelphia Phillies season =

1984 Philadelphia Phillies
- League: National League
- Division: East
- Ballpark: Veterans Stadium
- City: Philadelphia
- Record: 81–81 (.500)
- Divisional place: 4th
- Owners: Bill Giles
- General managers: Paul Owens
- Managers: Paul Owens
- Television: WTAF; PRISM
- Radio: WCAU (Harry Kalas, Richie Ashburn, Andy Musser, Chris Wheeler)

The 1984 Philadelphia Phillies season was the 102nd season in the history of the franchise, and the 14th season for the Philadelphia Phillies at Veterans Stadium.

== Offseason ==
- October 19, 1983: Pete Rose was released by the Phillies.
- December 3, 1983: Ron Reed was traded by the Phillies to the Chicago White Sox for a player to be named later. The White Sox completed the deal by sending Jerry Koosman to the Phillies on February 15, 1984.
- December 6, 1983: Tony Pérez was purchased from the Phillies by the Cincinnati Reds.
- January 30, 1984: Butch Benton was signed as a free agent by the Phillies.
- March 24, 1984: Willie Hernández and Dave Bergman were traded by the Phillies to the Detroit Tigers for John Wockenfuss and Glenn Wilson.

=== Spring training ===
The Phils went 13-16 in spring training exhibition play. The Phillies closed spring training with two games against the St. Louis Cardinals at the Louisiana Superdome on March 31, 1984, and April 1, 1984.

== Regular season ==
=== Season standings ===
NL East
Team	W	L	Pct.	GB	Home	Road
Chicago Cubs	96	65	.596	—	51‍–‍29	45‍–‍36
New York Mets	90	72	.556	6½	48‍–‍33	42‍–‍39
St. Louis Cardinals	84	78	.519	12½	44‍–‍37	40‍–‍41
Philadelphia Phillies	81	81	.500	15½	39‍–‍42	42‍–‍39
Montreal Expos	78	83	.484	18	39‍–‍42	39‍–‍41
Pittsburgh Pirates	75	87	.463	21½	41‍–‍40	34‍–‍47

=== Record vs. opponents ===
1984 National League record Sources:
Team	ATL	CHC	CIN	HOU	LAD	MON	NYM	PHI	PIT	SD	SF	STL
Atlanta	—	3–9	13–5	12–6	6–12	5–7	4–8	7–5	8–4	7–11	10–8	5–7
Chicago	9–3	—	7–5	6–6	7–5	10–7	12–6	9–9	8–10	6–6	9–3	13–5
Cincinnati	5–13	5–7	—	8–10	7–11	7–5	3–9	5–7	7–5	7–11	12–6	4–8
Houston	6–12	6–6	10–8	—	9–9	7–5	4–8	6–6	6–6	6–12	12–6	8–4
Los Angeles	12–6	5–7	7–11	9–9	—	6–6	3–9	3–9	4–8	10–8	10–8	6–6
Montreal	7–5	7–10	5–7	5–7	6–6	—	7–11	11–7	7–11	7–5	7–5	9–9
New York	8–4	6–12	9–3	8–4	9–3	11–7	—	10–8	12–6	6–6	4–8	7–11
Philadelphia	5-7	9–9	7–5	6–6	9–3	7–11	8–10	—	7–11	7–5	8–4	8–10
Pittsburgh	4–8	10–8	5–7	6–6	8–4	11–7	6–12	11–7	—	4–8	6–6	4–14
San Diego	11–7	6–6	11–7	12–6	8–10	5–7	6–6	5–7	8–4	—	13–5	7–5
San Francisco	8–10	3–9	6–12	6–12	8–10	5–7	8–4	4–8	6–6	5–13	—	7–5
St. Louis	7–5	5–13	8–4	4–8	6–6	9–9	11–7	10–8	14–4	5–7	5–7	—

=== Notable transactions ===
- April 20, 1984: Butch Benton was released by the Phillies.
- June 2, 1984: Dave Wehrmeister was signed as a free agent by the Phillies.
- June 3, 1984: Jim Kern was signed as a free agent by the Phillies.
- July 27, 1984: Jim Kern was released by the Phillies.
- August 20, 1984: Kelly Downs and George Riley were traded by the Phillies to the San Francisco Giants for Al Oliver and a player to be named later. The Giants completed the deal by sending Renie Martin to the Phillies on August 30.

==== Draft picks ====
- June 4, 1984: 1984 Major League Baseball draft
  - Marvin Freeman was drafted by the Phillies in the 2nd round. Player signed June 14, 1984.
  - Todd Frohwirth was drafted by the Phillies in the 13th round. Player signed June 9, 1984.
  - Keith Miller was drafted by the Phillies in the 16th round.

=== Game log ===
Legend
	Phillies win
	Phillies loss
	Postponement
**Bold**	Phillies team member

1984 Game Log
Overall Record: 81–81
April (11–9)

#	Date	Opponent	Score	Win	Loss	Save	Attendance	Record
1	April 3	@ Braves	5–0	**Steve Carlton** (1–0)	Len Barker (0–1)	None	34,331	1–0
2	April 4	@ Braves	0–4	Craig McMurtry (1–0)	**John Denny** (0–1)	Steve Bedrosian (1)	11,152	1–1
3	April 6	@ Reds	8–4	**Charles Hudson** (1–0)	Joe Price (0–1)	None	12,236	2–1
4	April 7	@ Reds	9–1	**Jerry Koosman** (1–0)	Frank Pastore (0–1)	None	12,516	3–1
5	April 8	@ Reds	7–8 (11)	Mike Smith (1–0)	**Larry Andersen** (0–1)	None	16,443	3–2
6	April 10	Astros	3–1	**John Denny** (1–1)	Nolan Ryan (1–1)	**Al Holland** (1)	37,236	4–2
7	April 11	Astros	7–6	**Bill Campbell** (1–0)	Bill Dawley (0–1)	None	20,108	5–2
8	April 13	@ Expos	1–5	Charlie Lea (2–1)	**Jerry Koosman** (1–1)	Gary Lucas (2)	48,060	5–3
9	April 14	@ Expos	4–3	**Larry Andersen** (1–1)	Dan Schatzeder (0–1)	**Al Holland** (2)	17,030	6–3
–	April 15	@ Expos	Postponed (rain); Makeup: August 7 as a traditional double-header					
–	April 16	@ Pirates	Postponed (rain); Makeup: June 22 as a traditional double-header					
10	April 17	@ Pirates	4–1	**Charles Hudson** (2–0)	John Tudor (1–1)	**Al Holland** (3)	34,114	7–3
11	April 18	@ Pirates	3–6	John Candelaria (2–1)	**Jerry Koosman** (1–2)	Don Robinson (2)	2,752	7–4
12	April 20	Mets	1–3 (10)	Doug Sisk (1–0)	**Al Holland** (0–1)	Jesse Orosco (3)	24,096	7–5
13	April 21	Mets	12–2	**John Denny** (2–1)	Mike Torrez (0–2)	None	27,114	8–5
14	April 22	Mets	12–5	**Charles Hudson** (3–0)	Ron Darling (1–2)	None	20,348	9–5
–	April 23	Pirates	Postponed (rain); Makeup: June 8 as a traditional double-header					
15	April 24	Pirates	2–3	John Candelaria (3–1)	**Jerry Koosman** (1–3)	Kent Tekulve (1)	14,096	9–6
16	April 25	Pirates	8–7	**Tug McGraw** (1–0)	Lee Tunnell (0–1)	**Al Holland** (4)	20,622	10–6
17	April 27	@ Mets	8–3	**Bill Campbell** (2–0)	Doug Sisk (1–1)	None	18,171	11–6
18	April 28	@ Mets	3–4	Ed Lynch (2–0)	**Al Holland** (0–2)	None	14,292	11–7
19	April 29	@ Mets	2–6	Walt Terrell (3–1)	**Jerry Koosman** (1–4)	Jesse Orosco (4)	28,562	11–8
20	April 30	Expos	2–5	Andy McGaffigan (1–0)	**Steve Carlton** (1–1)	None	20,277	11–9

May (16–10)

#	Date	Opponent	Score	Win	Loss	Save	Attendance	Record
21	May 1	Expos	7–4	**Kevin Gross** (1–0)	Bob James (0–2)	**Al Holland** (5)	20,118	12–9
22	May 2	Expos	2–3	Bob James (1–2)	**John Denny** (2–2)	Gary Lucas (4)	24,922	12–10
23	May 4	Reds	5–9	Frank Pastore (1–2)	**Charles Hudson** (3–1)	None	25,180	12–11
24	May 5	Reds	11–2	**Jerry Koosman** (2–4)	Bruce Berenyi (1–4)	None	30,073	13–11
25	May 6	Reds	3–5	John Franco (2–0)	**Steve Carlton** (1–2)	Tom Hume (3)	34,842	13–12
26	May 7	Braves	6–8	Pascual Pérez (1–0)	**Marty Bystrom** (0–1)	Gene Garber (2)	17,739	13–13
27	May 8	Braves	2–8	Pete Falcone (2–3)	**John Denny** (2–3)	None	13,443	13–14
28	May 9	@ Astros	1–7	Bob Knepper (3–4)	**Charles Hudson** (3–2)	None	9,824	13–15
29	May 10	@ Astros	2–4	Mike Scott (2–1)	**Jerry Koosman** (2–5)	Frank DiPino (4)	11,492	13–16
30	May 11	@ Padres	6–4	**Al Holland** (1–2)	Dave Dravecky (1–2)	None	18,009	14–16
31	May 12	@ Padres	3–2	**Bill Campbell** (3–0)	Andy Hawkins (3–1)	**Al Holland** (6)	36,916	15–16
32	May 13	@ Padres	8–3	**John Denny** (3–3)	Ed Whitson (2–3)	None	38,645	16–16
33	May 14	@ Dodgers	3–2	**Charles Hudson** (4–2)	Jerry Reuss (2–2)	**Al Holland** (7)	39,577	17–16
34	May 15	@ Dodgers	12–1	**Jerry Koosman** (3–5)	Bob Welch (3–4)	None	41,620	18–16
35	May 16	@ Dodgers	7–2	**Steve Carlton** (2–2)	Fernando Valenzuela (3–5)	None	48,938	19–16
36	May 18	@ Giants	1–0	**Marty Bystrom** (1–1)	Mike Krukow (2–5)	**Al Holland** (8)	12,641	20–16
37	May 19	@ Giants	6–2	**John Denny** (4–3)	Renie Martin (1–1)	**Al Holland** (9)	15,124	21–16
38	May 20	@ Giants	7–4	**Charles Hudson** (5–2)	Jeff Robinson (3–5)	**Larry Andersen** (1)	23,797	22–16
39	May 22	Dodgers	3–1	**Jerry Koosman** (4–5)	Bob Welch (3–5)	**Al Holland** (10)	30,190	23–16
40	May 23	Dodgers	0–1	Fernando Valenzuela (4–5)	**Steve Carlton** (2–3)	None	22,864	23–17
41	May 24	Dodgers	4–3	**Al Holland** (2–2)	Pat Zachry (2–1)	None	26,163	24–17
42	May 25	Padres	3–7	Ed Whitson (4–3)	**Charles Hudson** (5–3)	None	25,964	24–18
43	May 26	Padres	7–2	**Marty Bystrom** (2–1)	Mark Thurmond (3–3)	None	32,898	25–18
44	May 27	Padres	0–4	Tim Lollar (3–4)	**Jerry Koosman** (4–6)	Craig Lefferts (2)	34,352	25–19
–	May 29	Giants	Postponed (rain); Makeup: August 30 as a traditional double-header					
45	May 30	Giants	3–2	**Al Holland** (3–2)	Greg Minton (1–4)	None	13,524	26–19
46	May 31	Cubs	10–2	**Charles Hudson** (6–3)	Chuck Rainey (3–4)	None	25,044	27–19

June (15–15)

#	Date	Opponent	Score	Win	Loss	Save	Attendance	Record
47	June 1	Cubs	3–12	Rick Reuschel (3–1)	**Marty Bystrom** (2–2)	None	30,076	27–20
48	June 2	Cubs	3–2	**Al Holland** (4–2)	Lee Smith (3–3)	None	40,102	28–20
49	June 3	Cubs	2–11	Steve Trout (7–3)	**Kevin Gross** (1–1)	Warren Brusstar (2)	30,278	28–21
50	June 4	@ Cardinals	3–4 (11)	Bruce Sutter (2–3)	**Al Holland** (4–3)	None	27,131	28–22
51	June 5	@ Cardinals	3–5	Joaquín Andújar (10–4)	**Charles Hudson** (6–4)	Bruce Sutter (13)	23,921	28–23
52	June 6	@ Cardinals	3–4	Neil Allen (3–1)	**Bill Campbell** (3–1)	None	24,025	28–24
53	June 8 (1)	Pirates	5–4	**Jerry Koosman** (5–6)	John Candelaria (5–5)	**Al Holland** (11)	see 2nd game	29–24
54	June 8 (2)	Pirates	2–1	**Kevin Gross** (2–1)	Larry McWilliams (2–4)	**Al Holland** (12)	31,133	30–24
55	June 9	Pirates	6–5	**Steve Carlton** (3–3)	John Tudor (4–3)	**Al Holland** (13)	31,981	31–24
56	June 10	Pirates	6–12 (12)	Cecilio Guante (2–2)	**Jim Kern** (0–1)	None	32,996	31–25
57	June 11	Cardinals	4–6	Danny Cox (3–7)	**Marty Bystrom** (2–3)	Bruce Sutter (15)	20,844	31–26
58	June 12	Cardinals	2–7	Ricky Horton (2–0)	**Kevin Gross** (2–2)	Neil Allen (3)	22,265	31–27
59	June 13	Cardinals	4–1	**Jerry Koosman** (6–6)	Dave LaPoint (6–7)	None	22,212	32–27
60	June 14	@ Cubs	11–2	**Steve Carlton** (4–3)	Rich Bordi (2–1)	None	23,373	33–27
61	June 15	@ Cubs	5–2	**Charles Hudson** (7–4)	Chuck Rainey (5–5)	**Al Holland** (14)	27,489	34–27
62	June 16	@ Cubs	8–2	**Marty Bystrom** (3–3)	Rick Reuschel (3–3)	None	40,723	35–27
63	June 17	@ Cubs	9–7	**Kevin Gross** (3–2)	Dennis Eckersley (5–7)	**Al Holland** (15)	36,882	36–27
64	June 19	@ Mets	6–4	**Jerry Koosman** (7–6)	Ed Lynch (7–2)	None	28,061	37–27
65	June 20	@ Mets	4–7	Ron Darling (7–3)	**Steve Carlton** (4–4)	Doug Sisk (8)	28,082	37–28
66	June 21	@ Mets	7–10	Jesse Orosco (5–2)	**Bill Campbell** (3–2)	Doug Sisk (9)	20,094	37–29
67	June 22 (1)	@ Pirates	3–10	Larry McWilliams (4–5)	**Marty Bystrom** (3–4)	None	see 2nd game	37–30
68	June 22 (2)	@ Pirates	6–7 (13)	Rod Scurry (1–3)	**Bill Campbell** (3–3)	None	20,516	37–31
69	June 23	@ Pirates	7–5	**Jerry Koosman** (8–6)	John Candelaria (5–6)	None	19,014	38–31
70	June 24	@ Pirates	4–2	**Steve Carlton** (5–4)	John Tudor (4–5)	**Al Holland** (16)	17,749	39–31
71	June 25	Mets	5–10	Ron Darling (8–3)	**Charles Hudson** (7–5)	None	26,090	39–32
72	June 26	Mets	3–0	**Kevin Gross** (4–2)	Walt Terrell (5–7)	**Al Holland** (17)	28,347	40–32
73	June 27	Mets	5–1	**Marty Bystrom** (4–4)	Dwight Gooden (6–5)	**Larry Andersen** (2)	35,151	41–32
74	June 28	Astros	6–7	Bill Dawley (5–4)	**Al Holland** (4–4)	None	25,742	41–33
75	June 29	Astros	7–2	**Steve Carlton** (6–4)	Bob Knepper (7–8)	None	25,056	42–33
76	June 30	Astros	0–7	Mike LaCoss (3–0)	**Charles Hudson** (7–6)	Dave Smith (3)	23,483	42–34

July (14–13)

#	Date	Opponent	Score	Win	Loss	Save	Attendance	Record
77	July 1	Astros	1–13	Joe Niekro (8–7)	**Kevin Gross** (4–3)	None	24,737	42–35
78	July 2	Reds	4–0	**Shane Rawley** (3–3)	Tom Hume (3–8)	None	21,381	43–35
79	July 3	Reds	5–6	Charlie Puleo (1–1)	**Jerry Koosman** (8–7)	None	63,816	43–36
80	July 4	Reds	4–5 (10)	Ted Power (5–4)	**Al Holland** (4–5)	None	20,785	43–37
81	July 5	Braves	1–0 (7)	**Charles Hudson** (8–6)	Rick Mahler (6–4)	None	21,393	44–37
82	July 6	Braves	0–5	Pascual Pérez (9–3)	**Kevin Gross** (4–4)	None	22,393	44–38
83	July 7	Braves	2–5	Rick Camp (4–1)	**Shane Rawley** (3–4)	Donnie Moore (9)	27,141	44–39
84	July 8	Braves	7–0	**Jerry Koosman** (9–7)	Craig McMurtry (7–9)	None	38,070	45–39
–	July 10	**1984 Major League Baseball All-Star Game at Candlestick Park in San Francisco**						
85	July 12	@ Astros	5–3	**Steve Carlton** (7–4)	Joe Niekro (9–8)	**Al Holland** (18)	17,036	46–39
86	July 13	@ Astros	7–3	**Shane Rawley** (4–4)	Nolan Ryan (7–5)	**Larry Andersen** (3)	23,758	47–39
87	July 14	@ Astros	4–3	**Jerry Koosman** (10–7)	Vern Ruhle (1–7)	**Al Holland** (19)	29,211	48–39
88	July 15	@ Astros	2–3 (16)	Frank DiPino (3–5)	**Don Carman** (0–1)	None	15,276	48–40
89	July 16	@ Reds	7–2	**Kevin Gross** (5–4)	Tom Hume (3–9)	None	15,460	49–40
90	July 17	@ Reds	4–3	**Steve Carlton** (8–4)	Joe Price (3–7)	**Al Holland** (20)	14,083	50–40
91	July 18	@ Reds	7–5	**Shane Rawley** (5–4)	Jeff Russell (4–11)	**Al Holland** (21)	13,539	51–40
92	July 19	@ Braves	9–1	**Jerry Koosman** (11–7)	Craig McMurtry (7–11)	None	20,227	52–40
93	July 20	@ Braves	1–13	Len Barker (7–7)	**Charles Hudson** (8–7)	None	29,162	52–41
94	July 21	@ Braves	3–5	Rick Camp (5–2)	**Kevin Gross** (5–5)	Donnie Moore (10)	34,890	52–42
95	July 22	@ Braves	6–2	**Steve Carlton** (9–4)	Rick Mahler (6–6)	None	26,334	53–42
96	July 23	Cubs	2–3	Rick Sutcliffe (11–6)	**Shane Rawley** (5–5)	Lee Smith (21)	32,243	53–43
97	July 24	Cubs	3–2	**Jerry Koosman** (12–7)	Tim Stoddard (7–2)	**Al Holland** (22)	37,063	54–43
98	July 25	Cubs	4–9	Dennis Eckersley (8–10)	**Charles Hudson** (8–8)	None	45,183	54–44
99	July 27	Expos	1–6	David Palmer (5–3)	**Steve Carlton** (9–5)	Bob James (7)	30,222	54–45
100	July 28	Expos	1–4	Bryn Smith (9–8)	**Shane Rawley** (5–6)	None	34,303	54–46
101	July 29	Expos	6–4	**Kevin Gross** (6–5)	Jeff Reardon (3–4)	None	40,965	55–46
102	July 30	@ Cubs	2–3	Dennis Eckersley (9–10)	**Charles Hudson** (8–9)	Lee Smith (22)	29,425	55–47
103	July 31	@ Cubs	2–1 (10)	**Al Holland** (5–5)	Tim Stoddard (7–3)	**Bill Campbell** (1)	30,175	56–47

August (16–14)

#	Date	Opponent	Score	Win	Loss	Save	Attendance	Record
104	August 1	@ Cubs	4–5	Lee Smith (6–4)	**Al Holland** (5–6)	None	32,900	56–48
105	August 2	@ Cardinals	3–2	**Shane Rawley** (6–6)	Danny Cox (5–9)	**Al Holland** (23)	23,961	57–48
106	August 3	@ Cardinals	3–4	Ricky Horton (6–1)	**Jerry Koosman** (12–8)	Bruce Sutter (28)	26,771	57–49
107	August 4	@ Cardinals	2–3	Dave LaPoint (8–9)	**Larry Andersen** (1–2)	Bruce Sutter (29)	38,256	57–50
108	August 5	@ Cardinals	6–3	**Bill Campbell** (4–3)	Jeff Lahti (3–2)	**Al Holland** (24)	42,114	58–50
109	August 6	@ Expos	4–1	**Steve Carlton** (10–5)	Charlie Lea (14–7)	None	32,349	59–50
110	August 7 (1)	@ Expos	6–2	**Shane Rawley** (7–6)	Bryn Smith (9–10)	**Al Holland** (25)	see 2nd game	60–50
111	August 7 (2)	@ Expos	2–3	Jeff Reardon (5–4)	**Bill Campbell** (4–4)	None	39,271	60–51
112	August 8	@ Expos	1–3	Bill Gullickson (7–7)	**Jerry Koosman** (12–9)	Jeff Reardon (15)	25,244	60–52
113	August 9	Cardinals	2–1 (13)	**Bill Campbell** (5–4)	Dave Rucker (1–2)	None	27,676	61–52
114	August 10	Cardinals	0–3 (10)	Bruce Sutter (4–3)	**Larry Andersen** (1–3)	None	25,824	61–53
115	August 11	Cardinals	6–1	**Steve Carlton** (11–5)	Joaquín Andújar (15–11)	None	30,413	62–53
–	August 12	Cardinals	Postponed (rain); Makeup: September 12 as a traditional double-header					
116	August 14	@ Padres	2–3	Eric Show (12–7)	**Jerry Koosman** (12–10)	Craig Lefferts (8)	23,799	62–54
117	August 15	@ Padres	3–4	Rich Gossage (7–4)	**Al Holland** (5–7)	None	21,078	62–55
118	August 16	@ Padres	8–3	**John Denny** (5–3)	Andy Hawkins (7–5)	None	23,125	63–55
119	August 17	@ Dodgers	1–2	Rick Honeycutt (10–7)	**Steve Carlton** (11–6)	Ken Howell (3)	43,175	63–56
120	August 18	@ Dodgers	6–5	**Jerry Koosman** (13–10)	Ken Howell (2–3)	**Al Holland** (26)	45,619	64–56
121	August 19	@ Dodgers	6–3	**Shane Rawley** (8–6)	Bob Welch (10–12)	None	33,015	65–56
122	August 20	@ Giants	6–4	**John Denny** (6–3)	Mark Calvert (2–4)	**Al Holland** (27)	7,970	66–56
123	August 21	@ Giants	12–5	**Kevin Gross** (7–5)	Frank Williams (6–2)	None	5,560	67–56
124	August 22	@ Giants	5–7	Mark Davis (4–15)	**Al Holland** (5–8)	Gary Lavelle (9)	8,053	67–57
125	August 24	Dodgers	6–5 (10)	**Kevin Gross** (8–5)	Jerry Reuss (2–6)	None	35,541	68–57
126	August 25	Dodgers	4–7	Bob Welch (11–12)	**John Denny** (6–4)	Ken Howell (4)	30,253	68–58
127	August 26	Dodgers	10–8	**Bill Campbell** (6–4)	Burt Hooton (1–4)	**Larry Andersen** (4)	33,255	69–58
128	August 27	Padres	9–1	**Jerry Koosman** (14–10)	Tim Lollar (10–11)	None	26,302	70–58
129	August 28	Padres	11–8	**Shane Rawley** (9–6)	Andy Hawkins (7–7)	**Al Holland** (28)	25,679	71–58
130	August 29	Padres	0–2	Mark Thurmond (11–7)	**John Denny** (6–5)	None	25,131	71–59
131	August 30 (1)	Giants	5–6	Bob Lacey (1–2)	**Al Holland** (5–9)	Greg Minton (16)	see 2nd game	71–60
132	August 30 (2)	Giants	6–5	**Larry Andersen** (2–3)	Mark Davis (4–16)	None	36,354	72–60
133	August 31	Giants	5–6	Bill Laskey (7–11)	**Jerry Koosman** (14–11)	Mike Krukow (1)	21,530	72–61

September (9–20)

#	Date	Opponent	Score	Win	Loss	Save	Attendance	Record
134	September 1	Giants	2–7	Atlee Hammaker (2–0)	**Charles Hudson** (8–10)	Mark Grant (1)	20,528	72–62
135	September 2	Giants	8–3	**Shane Rawley** (10–6)	Jeff Robinson (7–14)	None	20,529	73–62
136	September 3	Cubs	3–4 (12)	George Frazier (7–4)	**Renie Martin** (1–2)	Lee Smith (29)	28,162	73–63
137	September 4	Cubs	2–7	Scott Sanderson (7–4)	**Steve Carlton** (11–7)	None	25,054	73–64
138	September 5	@ Cardinals	5–6	Dave Rucker (2–3)	**Al Holland** (5–10)	None	13,171	73–65
139	September 6	@ Cardinals	5–6	Bob Forsch (2–4)	**Bill Campbell** (6–5)	Bruce Sutter (39)	14,524	73–66
140	September 7	@ Expos	1–7	Bryn Smith (11–11)	**Shane Rawley** (10–7)	None	15,182	73–67
141	September 8	@ Expos	0–4	Steve Rogers (6–13)	**John Denny** (6–6)	None	18,140	73–68
142	September 9	@ Expos	6–5 (11)	**Larry Andersen** (3–3)	Joe Hesketh (1–1)	**Kevin Gross** (1)	31,348	74–68
143	September 10	@ Cubs	2–3	Tim Stoddard (9–5)	**Jerry Koosman** (14–12)	Lee Smith (31)	26,083	74–69
144	September 11	@ Cubs	6–3	**Charles Hudson** (9–10)	Lee Smith (9–6)	**Al Holland** (29)	28,964	75–69
145	September 12 (1)	Cardinals	3–1	**Shane Rawley** (11–7)	Kurt Kepshire (4–5)	None	see 2nd game	76–69
146	September 12 (2)	Cardinals	6–5	**Tug McGraw** (2–0)	Bruce Sutter (5–5)	None	18,811	77–69
147	September 13	Cardinals	10–2	**John Denny** (7–6)	Joaquín Andújar (19–12)	None	16,787	78–69
148	September 14	Expos	9–5	**Steve Carlton** (12–7)	Steve Rogers (6–14)	None	18,194	79–69
149	September 15	Expos	3–4	Bill Gullickson (11–7)	**Jerry Koosman** (14–13)	Bob James (9)	20,831	79–70
150	September 16	Expos	4–8	Jeff Reardon (6–7)	**Renie Martin** (1–3)	Bob James (10)	26,273	79–71
151	September 17	Mets	2–1	**Shane Rawley** (12–7)	Dwight Gooden (16–9)	None	20,483	80–71
152	September 18	Mets	5–8	Tom Gorman (5–0)	**Larry Andersen** (3–4)	Jesse Orosco (30)	18,765	80–72
153	September 19	Mets	13–5	**Steve Carlton** (13–7)	Ron Darling (12–8)	None	19,142	81–72
154	September 21	@ Pirates	1–5	Rod Scurry (5–6)	**Jerry Koosman** (14–14)	None	4,940	81–73
155	September 22	@ Pirates	1–2 (12)	Don Robinson (5–6)	**Larry Andersen** (3–5)	None	6,927	81–74
156	September 23	@ Pirates	2–4	John Tudor (11–11)	**Shane Rawley** (12–8)	John Candelaria (2)	11,249	81–75
157	September 24	@ Mets	5–7	Jesse Orosco (10–6)	**Larry Andersen** (3–6)	Brent Gaff (1)	11,071	81–76
158	September 25	@ Mets	4–6	Ed Lynch (9–8)	**Larry Andersen** (3–7)	None	13,812	81–77
159	September 26	@ Mets	1–7	Sid Fernandez (6–6)	**Jerry Koosman** (14–15)	None	5,251	81–78
–	September 28	Pirates	Postponed (rain); Makeup: September 30 as a traditional double-header					
160	September 29	Pirates	0–4	Rick Rhoden (14–9)	**Charles Hudson** (9–11)	None	27,493	81–79
161	September 30 (1)	Pirates	0–2	John Tudor (12–11)	**John Denny** (7–7)	Don Robinson (10)	see 2nd game	81–80
162	September 30 (2)	Pirates	2–7	Larry McWilliams (12–11)	**Shane Rawley** (12–9)	None	17,292	81–81

=== Roster ===
1984 Philadelphia Phillies
**Roster**
**Pitchers**: 47 Larry Andersen; 50 Marty Bystrom; 39 Bill Campbell; 32 Steve Carlton; 42 Don Carman; 40 John Denny; 44 Steve Fireovid; 46 Kevin Gross; 19 Al Holland; 49 Charles Hudson; 37 Jim Kern; 37,24 Jerry Koosman; 37 Renie Martin; 45 Tug McGraw; 48 Shane Rawley; 33 Dave Wehrmeister	**Catchers**: 6 Bo Díaz; 10 Mike LaValliere; 17 Ozzie Virgil; **Infielders**: 16 Luis Aguayo; 22 Tim Corcoran; 11 Iván DeJesús; 18 Kiko Garcia; 30 Steve Jeltz; 12 Len Matuszek; 52 Francisco Meléndez; 0 Al Oliver; 8 Juan Samuel; 20 Mike Schmidt; 53 Rick Schu; 15 John Wockenfuss	**Outfielders**: 21 Greg Gross; 9 Von Hayes; 23 Joe Lefebvre; 28 Sixto Lezcano; 31 Garry Maddox; 29 John Russell; 26 Jeff Stone; 27 Glenn Wilson	**Manager**: 5 Paul Owens; **Coaches**: 4 Dave Bristol (Third Base); 7 John Felske (Bench); 2 Deron Johnson (Hitting & First Base); 3 Claude Osteen (Pitching); 25 Mike Ryan (Bullpen)

== Player stats ==
=== Batting ===
==== Starters by position ====
Note: Pos = Position; G = Games played; AB = At bats; H = Hits; Avg. = Batting average; HR = Home runs; RBI = Runs batted in

Pos	Player	G	AB	H	Avg.	HR	RBI
C	Ozzie Virgil Jr.	141	456	119	.261	18	68
1B	Len Matuszek	101	262	65	.248	12	43
2B	Juan Samuel	160	701	191	.272	15	69
SS	Iván DeJesús	144	435	112	.257	0	35
3B	Mike Schmidt	151	528	146	.277	36	106
LF	Glenn Wilson	132	341	82	.240	6	31
CF	Von Hayes	152	561	164	.292	16	67
RF	Sixto Lezcano	109	256	71	.277	14	40

==== Other batters ====
Note: G = Games played; AB = At bats; H = Hits; Avg. = Batting average; HR = Home runs; RBI = Runs batted in

Player	G	AB	H	Avg.	HR	RBI
Garry Maddox	77	241	68	.282	5	19
Tim Corcoran	102	208	71	.341	5	36
Greg Gross	112	202	65	.322	0	16
Jeff Stone	51	185	67	.362	1	15
John Wockenfuss	86	180	52	.289	6	24
Joe Lefebvre	52	160	40	.250	3	18
John Russell	39	99	28	.283	2	11
Al Oliver	28	93	29	.312	0	14
Bo Díaz	27	75	16	.213	1	9
Luis Aguayo	58	72	20	.278	3	11
Steve Jeltz	28	68	14	.206	1	7
Kiko Garcia	57	60	14	.233	0	5
Rick Schu	17	29	8	.276	2	5
Francisco Meléndez	21	23	3	.130	0	2
Mike LaValliere	6	7	0	.000	0	0

=== Pitching ===
==== Starting pitchers ====
Note: G = Games pitched; IP = Innings pitched; W = Wins; L = Losses; ERA = Earned run average; SO = Strikeouts

Player	G	IP	W	L	ERA	SO
Steve Carlton	33	229.0	13	7	3.58	163
Jerry Koosman	36	224.0	14	15	3.25	137
Charles Hudson	30	173.2	9	11	4.04	94
John Denny	22	154.1	7	7	2.45	94
Shane Rawley	18	120.1	10	6	3.81	58
Marty Bystrom	11	56.2	4	4	5.08	36

==== Other pitchers ====
Note: G = Games pitched; IP = Innings pitched; W = Wins; L = Losses; ERA = Earned run average; SO = Strikeouts

Player	G	IP	W	L	ERA	SO
Kevin Gross	44	129.0	8	5	4.12	84

==== Relief pitchers ====
Note: G = Games pitched; W = Wins; L = Losses; SV = Saves; ERA = Earned run average; SO = Strikeouts

Player	G	W	L	SV	ERA	SO
Al Holland	68	5	10	29	3.39	61
Larry Andersen	64	3	7	4	2.38	54
Bill Campbell	57	6	5	1	3.43	52
Tug McGraw	25	2	0	0	3.79	26
Don Carman	11	0	1	0	5.40	16
Renie Martin	9	0	2	0	4.60	5
Jim Kern	8	0	1	0	10.13	8
Dave Wehrmeister	7	0	0	0	7.20	13
Steve Fireovid	6	0	0	0	1.59	3

== Awards and honors ==
- Juan Samuel, National League record (since broken), Most Stolen Bases by a rookie

== Farm system ==
Level	Team	League	Manager
AAA	Portland Beavers	Pacific Coast League	Lee Elia
AA	Reading Phillies	Eastern League	Bill Dancy
A	Peninsula Pilots	Carolina League	Ron Clark
A	Spartanburg Suns	South Atlantic League	Jay Ward
A-Short Season	Bend Phillies	Northwest League	Ramón Avilés
Rookie	GCL Phillies	Gulf Coast League	Roly de Armas
