= Doping in baseball =

Use of performance enhancing drugs, commonly steroids, amongst baseball players

Doping in baseball has been an ongoing issue for Major League Baseball (MLB). After repeated use by some of the most successful professional baseball players in MLB history, these banned substances found their way to the collegiate level. At the junior college level, due to lack of funding and NCAA drug testing, the abuse of PEDs is most common, but they are also an issue in Division I, II and III.

Several players have suggested that drug use is rampant in baseball. In 2003, David Wells stated that "25 to 40 percent of all Major Leaguers are juiced". Jose Canseco stated on 60 Minutes and in his 2005 tell-all book Juiced that as many as 80% of players used steroids, and that he credited steroid use for his entire career. Ken Caminiti revealed that he won the 1996 National League MVP award while on steroids. In February 2009, after reports emerged alleging that Alex Rodriguez tested positive for steroids in 2003, a year in which he was American League MVP, he admitted to having used performance-enhancing drugs (PEDs) between 2001 and 2003. Mark McGwire, dogged by allegations of PED use for years, admitted in January 2010 that he had used steroids and human growth hormone off and on for over a decade, including in 1998 when he set the single-season home run record.

== Historical usage ==
=== Origins ===
Players have attempted to gain chemical advantages in baseball since the earliest days of the sport. In 1889, for example, pitcher Pud Galvin became the first baseball player to be widely known for his use of performance-enhancing substances. Galvin was a user and vocal proponent of the Brown-Séquard Elixir, a testosterone supplement derived from the testicles of live animals such as dogs and guinea pigs.

The book The Baseball Hall of Shame's Warped Record Book, written by Bruce Nash, Bob Smith, Allan Zullo, and Lola Tipton, includes an account of Babe Ruth administering to himself an injection of an extract from sheep testicles. The experimental concoction allegedly proved ineffective, making Ruth ill and leading the Yankees to attribute his absence from the lineup to "a bellyache".

During World War II, both the Allied and Axis powers systematically provided amphetamines to their troops, in order to improve soldiers' endurance and mental focus. After the end of the war, many of those returning troops attended college, and when they did, they applied their knowledge of the benefits of amphetamine use first to college sports, and then to professional sports, including professional baseball.

=== Early history ===
According to writer Zev Chafets, Mickey Mantle's fade during his 1961 home run chase with Roger Maris was the indirect result of an attempt by Mantle to gain a substance-based edge. Chafets alleges that Mantle was hampered by an abscess created by a botched injection of a chemical cocktail administered by a "quack" doctor, Max Jacobsen. According to Chafets, the injection included steroids and amphetamines, among other substances.

In his autobiography I Had a Hammer, which was co-written with Lonnie Wheeler and published in 1992, outfielder Hank Aaron wrote that he accepted an amphetamine pill from an unnamed teammate and took it before a game during the 1968 season, after becoming frustrated about his lack of offensive performance. Aaron described it as "a stupid thing to do", observing that the pill made him feel like he "was having a heart attack".

Former pitcher Tom House, drafted in 1967 and active in MLB from 1971–1978, has admitted to using "steroids they wouldn't give to horses" during his playing career. According to House, the use of performance-enhancing drugs was widespread at that time. He estimates that "six or seven" pitchers on every team were at least experimental users of steroids or human growth hormone, and says that after losses, players would frequently joke that they'd been "out-milligrammed" rather than beaten.

=== The "Steroid Era" ===
The period of time, usually placed sometime between the late 1980s and late 2000s has been dubbed the "Steroid Era" by some authors, due to allegations of increased steroid use among MLB players at this time. In Steroids and Major League Baseball, the "Pre Steroids Era" is defined as running from 1985 to 1993, while the "Steroids Era" runs from 1994 to 2004.

Third baseman Mike Schmidt, an active player from 1972–1989, admitted to Murray Chass in 2006 that he had used amphetamines "a couple [of] times". In his book Clearing the Bases, he said that amphetamines "were widely available in major-league clubhouses" during his playing career, and that "amphetamine use in baseball is both far more common and has been going on a lot longer than steroid abuse".

Relief pitcher Goose Gossage, active from 1972–1994, also admitted to using amphetamines during his playing career, in a 2013 interview with Ken Davidoff. In the same interview, Gossage voiced the opinion that amphetamines are not "a performance-enhancing drug", though he admitted that using them was illegal at the time.

During the Pittsburgh drug trials in 1985, several players testified about the use of amphetamines in baseball. Shortstop Dale Berra admitted that he had used "greenies" while playing for both the Pittsburgh Pirates and the AAA Portland Beavers, and stated that while in Pittsburgh between 1979 and 1984 he had been supplied with the drugs by teammates Bill Madlock and Willie Stargell. Outfielder John Milner testified that while he was playing for the New York Mets, he had seen in the locker of teammate Willie Mays a powerful liquid amphetamine he called the "red juice".

In 1988, sportswriter Thomas Boswell claimed that Jose Canseco was the most conspicuous user of steroids in MLB. Later that year, the Anti-Drug Abuse Act of 1988 criminalized the use and distribution of anabolic steroids.

Steroids finally made it to baseball's banned substance list in 1991; however, testing for major league players did not begin until the 2003 season. While testing for steroids began, the usage did not stop.

== Jose Canseco ==
In 2005, Jose Canseco released a tell-all book, Juiced, about his experience with steroids in his career. In the book, Canseco named several other players, including Mark McGwire, Rafael Palmeiro, Ivan Rodriguez, Juan Gonzalez and Jason Giambi, as steroid users. The book caused great controversy, and most of these players claimed Canseco's implications to be false, though McGwire and Giambi later admitted to using PEDs, and Palmeiro has tested positive.

In 2008, Canseco released another book, Vindicated, about his frustrations in the aftermath of the publishing of Juiced. In it, he discusses his belief that Alex Rodriguez also used steroids. The claim was proven true with Rodriguez's admission in 2009, just after his name was leaked as being on the list of 103 players who tested positive for banned substances in Major League Baseball. In July 2013, Alex Rodriguez was again under investigation for using banned substances provided by Biogenesis of America. He was suspended for the entirety of the 2014 season.

In January 2010, Mark McGwire admitted to using steroids throughout his professional baseball career. He claimed to only have used steroids for health reasons and for quick recovery, never for strength or size gains. These claims were publicly disputed by McGwire's steroid supplier, who stated that he did, in fact, use steroids to gain a competitive edge. The admission of steroid use caused some to question whether or not his long list of accomplishments should be invalidated. His most famous accomplishment took place in the 1998 season when he broke the single season home run record previously held by Roger Maris.

It was after this accomplishment that McGwire and other MLB players came under scrutiny for use of steroids. A news reporter, Steve Wilstein, stumbled upon an open container of androstenedione in McGwire's locker in August of the '98 season. At the time androstenedione was not on the banned substance list for Major League Baseball, but was viewed as a precursor to anabolic steroids and was banned by the International Olympic Committee, the National Football League, and the National Collegiate Athletic Association.

== Congressional investigation ==
The nutrition center BALCO was accused of distributing steroids to many star players, most notably Barry Bonds and Jason Giambi. Baseball has attempted to toughen its drug policy, beginning a plan of random tests to players. Players such as Ryan Franklin and others were handed suspensions as short as ten days. However, a Congressional panel continued to argue that the penalties were not tough enough, and took action.

Many top players, including Canseco, Rafael Palmeiro, Mark McGwire, Sammy Sosa, and Curt Schilling were summoned on March 17, 2005 to testify in front of Congress (Schilling was summoned because of his outspoken opposition to the use of PEDs). During the session, Canseco admitted his steroid use, which he claimed was perfectly acceptable in the 1980s and early 1990s. Palmeiro denied all steroid use during his career, while McGwire refused to discuss the issue, contending that he would be considered guilty no matter what he said. His repeated statement, "I'm not here to talk about the past," became the most highlighted moment of the proceedings.

Palmeiro, who was listed in Canseco's book as a user along with McGwire, denied Canseco's claims and told Congress that those claims were absolutely erroneous. The committee had stated that baseball had failed to confront the problems of performance-enhancing drugs. The committee was disturbed by the accepted use of steroids by athletes because it created a bad persona of players who in many cases are role models to many of the aspiring youth. During the testimonies the players called to Congress offered their condolences for youthful athletes who had committed suicide after using performance-enhancing drugs.

Five months after the Congressional hearing, information came out indicating Palmeiro had already tested positive for steroids and knew it when he spoke before Congress. He appealed but the test results and ensuing suspension were upheld. Mark McGwire, whose credentials could arguably satisfy expectations for first ballot Hall of Fame election, was denied election in his first year, with many voters citing McGwire's perceived refusal to speak at the Congressional Investigation.

=== BALCO scandal ===
During this period, Bonds' trainer Greg Anderson and BALCO head Victor Conte (also connected to Jason Giambi and Canseco) were not subpoenaed in California by the House Committee for investigation.

As a result of pressure from Congress, baseball and the Major League Baseball Players Association started applying stricter regulations and applied a zero tolerance policy in correspondence to performance-enhancing drugs. On August 1, 2005, Palmeiro tested positive for performing-enhancing substances and was suspended for ten days. Once thought to be a lock for the Baseball Hall of Fame as one of only four players to have both 3,000 hits and 500 home runs, Palmeiro's legacy has since been called into question. Palmeiro's career quickly plummeted, and he did not play again following the 2005 season after his contract expired.

== 2006 Baseball steroids investigation ==
On March 29, 2006, ESPN learned that former Senator, Boston Red Sox board member, and Disney chairman George J. Mitchell would head an investigation into past steroid use by Major League Baseball players, including San Francisco Giants outfielder Barry Bonds. Mitchell was appointed by baseball commissioner Bud Selig in the wake of controversy over the book Game of Shadows, which chronicles alleged extensive use of performance-enhancing drugs, including several different types of steroids and human growth hormones Bonds allegedly had taken. Selig did not refer to Bonds by name in announcing the investigation, and many past and present players would be investigated. Mitchell took on a role similar to that of John Dowd, who investigated Pete Rose's alleged gambling in the late 1980s. However, Selig acknowledged that the book, by way of calling attention to the issue, was in part responsible for the league's decision to commission an independent investigation. A report of the investigation, released on December 13, 2007, named more than 80 former and current baseball players.

On June 6, 2006, Arizona Diamondbacks relief pitcher Jason Grimsley's home was searched by federal agents. He later admitted to using human growth hormone, steroids, and amphetamines. According to court documents, Grimsley failed a baseball drug test in 2003 and allegedly named other current and former players who also used drugs. On June 7, 2006, he was released by the Diamondbacks, reportedly at his own request.

== MLB steroid policy ==
Over most of the course of Major League Baseball history, steroid testing was not a major issue. In 1990, Congress passed a new federal law criminalizing the use of steroids without a prescription. In 1991, in response to that law, then-Commissioner Fay Vincent sent a memo to all teams stating that steroids had been added to the banned substance list, that their use was against the rules, though there was no testing regime implemented at that time (which would have required collective bargaining). Vincent has said that the memo was intended as a "moral statement" to the players, rather than a "legal one", that "the only way a change [to enforcement] could be made was through collective bargaining," He later clarified that Congress had banned those substances, but that aside from those criminal penalties existing, he couldn't test or punish the major-league players without player agreement, and that his memo emphasized that "[W]e are gonna be bound by those restrictions, and steroids are gonna be a problem." According to Vincent, “When [he] left baseball [in 1992], there was no written policy on drug activity in baseball."

Following increased public awareness of the role steroids were playing in baseball, the league and union agreed in 2002 on a new testing regime.. It provided for a pilot set of tests of players in 2003, without names being publicly disclosed, and if over 5% of players tested positive, leaguewide testing with penalties would follow in 2004. That pilot did result in leaguewide testing in 2004, although no player was suspended for use that season. HGH was added to the banned substances list in 2005, although lack of a sufficiently convenient and precise test for HGH prevented its inclusion in testing at the time.

After the BALCO scandal, which involved allegations that top baseball players had used illegal performance-enhancing drugs, Major League Baseball and the MLBPA agreed on a new, stricter enforcement policy. The policy was issued at the start of the 2005 season and went as follows:

A first positive test resulted in a suspension of ten games, a second positive test resulted in a suspension of 30 games, the third positive test resulted in a suspension of 60 games, the fourth positive test resulted in a suspension of one full year, and a fifth positive test resulted in a penalty at the commissioner's discretion. Players were tested at least once per year, with the chance that several players could be tested many times.

In November 2005, MLB owners and players approved even tougher penalties for positive tests. Under the new rules, a first positive test would result in a 50-game suspension, a second positive test would result in a 100-game suspension, and a third positive test would result in a lifetime suspension from MLB.

On July 22, 2010, following advances in testing technology, MLB announced that it would begin testing minor-league players for HGH, and after agreement with the union, implemented blood testing for HGH beginning with spring training in 2012. They expanded the testing to include in-season tests, beginning with the 2013 season.

On March 28, 2014, the players and owners announced that the penalties for a positive test would be increased to an 80-game suspension for the first offense, then escalate to a 162-game suspension for the second offense, and a lifetime ban from the sport for the third. Players suspended for the season will not be allowed to participate in post-season games. Suspensions do not allow the player to be paid while suspended. This steroid policy brings MLB closer to international rules.

On February 7, 2022, the Associated Press reported that Major League Baseball has stopped testing players for steroids for the first time in nearly 20 years due to the expiration of the sport's drug agreement, two people familiar with the sport's Joint Drug Program stated. These informants people spoke on condition of anonymity because no public announcement was made. At the time, MLB and the union declined comment on the halt. The halt in testing was due to a 99 day lockout, which ended on March 10, 2022. Testing resumed at that time, but doping and antidoping experts both expressed concern that there was ample time for foul play.

== Barry Bonds's trial ==
Steven Hoskins, on Wednesday, March 23, 2010, testified against Barry Bonds as a government witness in the perjury and obstruction of justice case against the former baseball star. Hoskins described Barry Bonds's use of anabolic steroids, and how his personal trainer, Greg Anderson, would discuss taking the steroids in an open manner. Even though Hoskins never witnessed Barry Bonds actually taking the drugs, he witnessed Anderson handling the needle, and Barry Bonds going in and out of the bedroom, and Barry Bonds complaining about the shots leaving his butt sore. Barry Bonds would use his girlfriends to get the steroids, and would pay them a few thousand dollars at a time.

== Biogenesis anti-aging clinic ==
On January 10, 2013, MLB and the players union reached an agreement to add random, in season human growth hormone testing and a new test to reveal the use of testosterone. This testing began in the 2013 season and at least twenty MLB players (and athletes in other sports) were accused of taking HGH. Ultimately 14 were suspended, most famously Ryan Braun of the Milwaukee Brewers (suspended for final 65 games of 2013 season), Alex Rodriguez of the New York Yankees (suspended for 211 games (later reduced to 162 games which was the entirety of the 2014 season)), and Nelson Cruz of the Texas Rangers (50 games). The clinic was run by Anthony “Tony” Bosch in Florida. The notebooks he kept made it clear that he supplied human growth hormones, anabolic steroids, and performance-enhancing drug lozenges to his clients, which not only included professional athletes but teenagers as well. It was later revealed that Bosch was not a doctor and has a fake medical degree.

== Doping in college baseball ==
Although the NCAA randomly drug-tests student athletes from Division I to Division III, the abuse of performance-enhancing drugs is not uncommon in the college level. It is up to the schools and universities whether they want to implement their own drug testing policy, which most do. The shortcut to the MLB is found in the junior college level or the National Junior College Athletic Association (NJCAA). The NJCAA does not drug-test their student athletes so it is up to that college whether or not the players are drug tested at all. Players in JuCo are also eligible for the MLB draft after one year in college. This allows players a way to get around drug tests while also taking a quicker route to the pros which is very appealing to many of the top prospects. Two former LSU baseball players admitted that it was much easier to cheat the drug test at their junior colleges and that they had suspicions about certain teams that they played. Even though this is where the use of PEDs is most common, they are still a problem in NCAA as well. Today 10 percent of Division I, 35 percent of Division II, and 79 percent of Division III schools have their own drug test policy. The head baseball coach for LSU, Paul Maineri, said in 2009 that after recruiting certain players from junior colleges that were not the same after showing up on campus, "In retrospect looking back, I’m a little smarter and would recognize that the players I recruited were doing something artificially help them in junior college". Many MLB scouts along with coaches worry about drafting or recruiting players that are using performance-enhancing drugs with the concern that they would not be the same player after they arrive.

== MLB Drug Program ==
Major league baseball had established an anti-drug policy program to prevent any sort substances banned by the league. The Office of the Commissioner of Baseball states that using these banned substances puts players health at risk and also puts players at an unfair advantage. The MLB has created many jointed sub programs listed below.

- MLB’s Joint Drug Prevention and Treatment Program (40-Man Roster Players)
- Major League Alcohol and Marijuana Policy
- Minor League Joint Drug Prevention and Treatment Program (Domestic MiLB Players)
- Minor League Alcohol and Marijuana Policy
- Cannabis Use Policy

== Effects on Hall of Fame ==
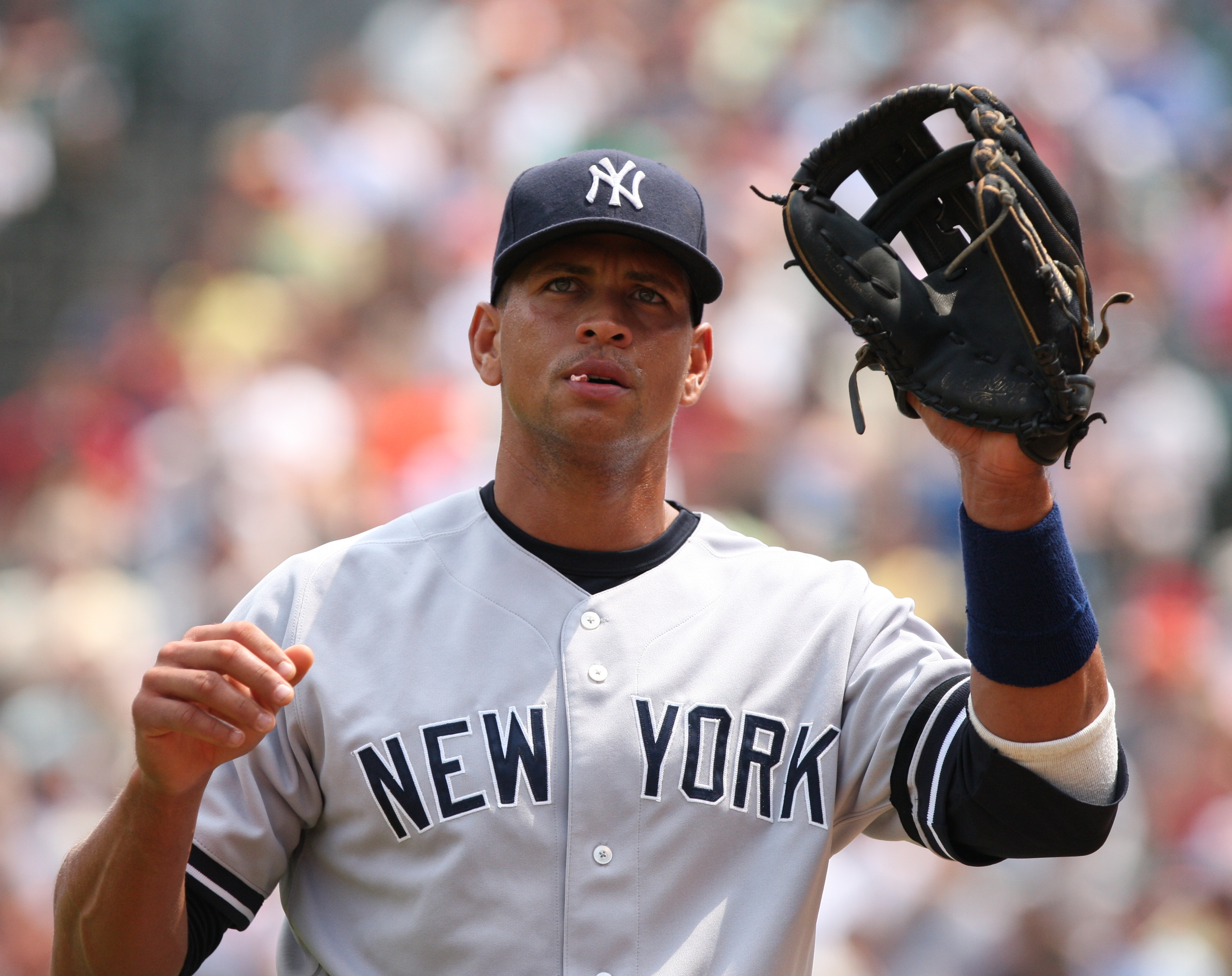
Alex Rodriguez has admitted to using performance-enhancing drugs from 2001–2003. MLB suspended him for 211 games after he was found to be using HGH.

Mark McGwire remained on the Hall of Fame ballot for the full ten years of eligibility, but never polled more than 24% of the vote. 75% of the vote is required for election.

In the 2013 election, not a single player was voted into the Hall of Fame by the BBWAA. With players such as Barry Bonds, Roger Clemens, and Sammy Sosa making their first appearance on the ballot, there was great debate on the use of steroids surrounding the legitimacy of their performance toward election. With the topic of steroid use coming into the picture during these player's careers and the Mitchell report released in 2007 investigating past steroid and human growth hormone use, the perception of these accomplishments has been debated as "controversial to the game of baseball and America's view on the sport".

Fans of the sport continue to debate whether or not these players should be elected, with some thinking that if they were to be, it might send a message to the world of baseball that it is acceptable to use steroids. Despite this, others believe their accomplishments in the sport outweigh their negative associations with doping. In the 2019 election, Bonds and Clemens ballots had over 59% of the vote, compared with a little over 36% in 2013. In the 2022 election, Bonds and Clemens final year on the ballot, Bonds had 66%, and Clemens had 65%, and missed the Hall of Fame.

== See also ==
- Doping in sport
- Doping in the United States
- Major League Baseball drug policy
- List of Major League Baseball players suspended for performance-enhancing drugs
- List of banned substances in baseball
