= Accelerated Rehabilitative Disposition =

Pre-trial intervention program in the Commonwealth of Pennsylvania

Accelerated Rehabilitative Disposition (ARD) is a pretrial intervention program in the Commonwealth of Pennsylvania, United States for non-violent offenders with no prior or limited record.

The primary purpose of the program is the rehabilitation of the offender and secondarily the prompt disposition of charges, eliminating the need for costly and time-consuming trials or other court proceedings. Accordingly, Defendants are generally required to waive certain constitutional rights in exchange for consideration of their case for ARD. The aim of the program is to intervene at an early state, so that steps can be taken to prevent future incidents of a similar nature.

Candidates admitted into the program are closely screened by the district attorney’s office. To be accepted into an ARD program, the defendant has to agree to certain conditions such as making restitution or completing substance abuse treatment. While in an ARD program, defendants are placed under supervision, similar to probation. They may also be ordered to do community service.

The defendant doesn't have to admit to any wrongdoing when applying for ARD, but must plead guilty to any summary offenses, usually violations of the motor vehicle code. The court may impose costs and assessments, but not a fine. Roughly 90% of the people in the ARD program have been arrested for driving under the influence of alcohol or a controlled substance.

The maximum period of supervision for someone on ARD is two years. After successfully completing the program, the ARD offender may petition the court to have the charges dismissed and the case expunged. Offenders who do not comply with the conditions of the program may be removed from the program and the case will be placed back on the trial list.

== See also ==
- Pretrial Intervention Program (New Jersey)

== Notes ==
- The Pennsylvania Code Accelerated Rehabilitative Disposition (ARD)
- County of Chester, Pennsylvania. Adult Probation and Parole Department A.R.D. Accelerated Rehabilitative Disposition Program
- J. Timothy George: Accelerated Rehabilitative Disposition
