= Vindicated (book) =

2008 book by José Canseco

Vindicated: Big Names, Big Liars, and the Battle to Save Baseball
- Author: José Canseco
- Language: English
- Publisher: Simon Spotlight Entertainment
- Publication date: 2008
- Publication place: United States
- Media type: Print ()
- Pages: 272
- ISBN: 1-4165-9187-7
- OCLC: 191763280
- Dewey Decimal: 796.357092 B 22
- LC Class: GV865.C313 A3 2008

Vindicated: Big Names, Big Liars, and the Battle to Save Baseball is a 2008 book written by former Major League Baseball player José Canseco. This book, similar to his first, Juiced: Wild Times, Rampant 'Roids, Smash Hits & How Baseball Got Big (2005), focuses mainly on steroids in baseball. Vindicated has made several headlines. Canseco also writes of the now infamous 1998 party at his home.
