= Tim Berra (American football) =

American football player (born 1951)

- Berra in 1975

No. 84
- Positions: Return specialist, wide receiver

Personal information
- Born: September 23, 1951 (age 75); Montclair, New Jersey, U.S.
- Listed height: 5 ft 11 in (1.80 m)
- Listed weight: 185 lb (84 kg)

Career information
- High school: Monclair (NJ); Seton Hall Prep (NJ)
- College: UMass
- NFL draft: 1974: 17th round, 421 (By the Baltimore Colts)th overall pick

Career history
- Baltimore Colts (1974)

Career NFL statistics
- Games played: 14
- Starts: 0
- Kickoff returns: 13 (19.9 average)
- Punt returns: 16 (7.1 average)
- Stats at Pro Football Reference

Timothy Thomas Berra (born September 23, 1951) is an American former professional football player who played for the Baltimore Colts in 1974. He is the son of Baseball Hall of Fame catcher Yogi Berra and the brother of former Major League Baseball (MLB) infielder Dale Berra.

== Early life ==
Berra played football for Bordentown Military Institute, Bordentown, N.J. before attending UMass.

== College career ==
Berra played college football for the UMass Minutemen from 1970 to 1973. During his senior season, he set the school's single-season record for receiving yards with 922 and the single-season touchdown receiving record with 12. He also held the school record for most career receiving yards with 1,486.

== Professional career ==
Berra was selected by the Baltimore Colts in the 17th round (421st overall) of the 1974 NFL draft. He was signed by the Colts on February 10, 1974.

He played in fourteen games for the Colts in 1974, primarily on special teams. He returned 16 punts for 114 yards and 13 kickoffs for 259 yards.

The Colts released Berra on September 3, 1975.

== Personal life ==
As of May 2001, Berra resides in West Caldwell, New Jersey and is the president of LTD Enterprises, a company that handles business for his father.
