= Pittsburgh drug trials =

Major League Baseball-related cocaine scandal

The Pittsburgh drug trials of 1985 were the catalyst for a Major League Baseball-related cocaine scandal. Several current and former members of the Pittsburgh Pirates – Dale Berra, Lee Lacy, Lee Mazzilli, John Milner, Dave Parker, Rod Scurry – and other notable major league players – Willie Aikens, Vida Blue, Enos Cabell, Keith Hernandez, Jeffrey Leonard, Tim Raines, Lonnie Smith and Alan Wiggins – were called before a Pittsburgh grand jury. Their testimony led to the drug trials, which made national headlines in September 1985.

Eleven players were officially suspended, but all the suspensions were commuted in exchange for fines, drug testing, and community service. The Pittsburgh drug trials are considered one of baseball's biggest all-time scandals, albeit one that was "behind the scenes" and did not directly affect play on the field.

== Testimony ==
The players were granted immunity in exchange for their testimony.

Ex-Pirate John Milner talked about getting amphetamines from Hall of Famers Willie Mays and Willie Stargell. Milner added that he bought two grams of cocaine for $200 in the bathroom stalls at Three Rivers Stadium during a Pirates–Houston Astros game in 1980. Keith Hernandez revealed he had used cocaine for three years. Hernandez later added that about 40% of all Major League Baseball players were using cocaine in the early 1980s – he quickly backtracked, however, saying that he might have been "grossly wrong." Tim Raines admitted keeping a gram of cocaine in his uniform pocket (as well as revealing that he snorted during games), and that he only slid into bases headfirst so as not to break the vial.

Testimony also revealed that Rod Scurry once left the stadium to go looking for cocaine during the late innings of a Pirates game. Drug dealers frequented the Pirates' clubhouse. Even the Pirate Parrot, Kevin Koch, was implicated for buying cocaine and introducing a few of the ballplayers to a local drug dealer.

== Verdict ==
Dealer Curtis Strong (ostensibly the Philadelphia Phillies' clubhouse caterer) and six Pittsburgh men were convicted and found guilty of 11 counts of distributing cocaine by the United States District Court for the Western District of Pennsylvania:

- Curtis Strong: Convicted on 11 counts of selling cocaine — received a 12-year prison sentence, but was ultimately released after serving four years
- Dale Shiffman, 54, of Baldwin: indicted on 111 counts, pleaded guilty to 20 – sentenced to 12 years, and ultimately served two years in the federal penitentiary
- Shelby Greer, 49, of Mt. Washington: Pleaded guilty to seven criminal counts
- Thomas P. Balzer: Pleaded guilty to selling cocaine — sentenced to 18 months in prison
- Kevin M. Connolly: Pleaded guilty to selling cocaine — sentenced to 2.5 years in prison
- Jeffrey L. Mosco, 49, of Shaler: Pleaded guilty to three drug-related counts – spent 18 months in prison
- Robert W. "Rav" McCue: Convicted on seven counts of cocaine distribution

In September 2006, Shiffman and the former mascot Koch were interviewed on HBO's Real Sports with Bryant Gumbel in a segment entitled "Under the Influence."

=== Suspensions ===
On February 28, 1986, Baseball Commissioner Peter Ueberroth handed down suspensions to 11 players. All the suspensions were commuted in exchange for fines and community service. Ueberroth also asked each suspended player to submit to voluntary urine tests – ultimately, the Players Association thwarted that plea.

Seven players were determined to have been prolonged drug users who had also facilitated distribution to other players, and were suspended for a full season. The players were allowed to continue playing under the condition that they donated 10% of their base salaries to drug-abuse programs, submitted to random drug testing, and contributed 100 hours of drug-related community service.

- Joaquín Andújar
- Dale Berra
- Enos Cabell
- Keith Hernandez
- Jeffrey Leonard
- Dave Parker
- Lonnie Smith

Four players were suspended for 60 days; they were allowed to continue playing if they donated 5% of base salaries and contributed 50 hours of drug-related community service:

- Al Holland
- Lee Lacy
- Lary Sorensen
- Claudell Washington

Ten other players were named, but not suspended or otherwise punished. They were, however, subject to random drug testing for the duration of their careers:

- Dusty Baker
- Vida Blue
- Gary Matthews
- Dickie Noles
- Tim Raines
- Manny Sarmiento
- Daryl Sconiers
- Rod Scurry
- Derrel Thomas
- Alan Wiggins

== Aftermath ==
After the 1985 season ended, Chuck Tanner, manager of the Pittsburgh Pirates since 1977, was fired after a 104 loss season, the worst since 1954.

In July 1987, a year and a half after the verdicts, and after Commissioner Peter Ueberroth declared that baseball was free of drugs, Lonnie Smith told the Kansas City Times that under his agreement he was supposed to be tested six-to-eight times per year, but had not been tested to-date in 1987. More so, he strongly disagreed with Peter Ueberroth that baseball was then drug-free.

Several players went on to rejuvenated careers in the wake of the scandal:

- Dave Parker — signed with the Cincinnati Reds and was selected to the All-Star team in 1985, 1986 and 1990
- Keith Hernandez – recovered and continued his consecutive Gold Glove streak through 1988
- Lonnie Smith – signed with the Atlanta Braves and selected as the MLB Comeback Player of the Year Award in 1989

Others continued to struggle with substance abuse:

- Rod Scurry — died from a cocaine-related heart attack in 1992, at the age of 36
- Willie Aikens – convicted in 1994 of selling crack cocaine and sentenced to 20 years in prison; he was released on June 4, 2008
- Lary Sorensen – after a sixth drunk driving conviction, was sentenced to more than two years in prison in 2005
- Alan Wiggins – died in 1991 after having contracted HIV via intravenous drug use.

Serving as a precursor to those listed on the Mitchell Report not being voted into the National Baseball Hall of Fame and Museum due to steroid abuse, Hall of Fame caliber players associated with the drug trials have long been thought to be effectively blackballed from the Hall without being formally banned from baseball, possibly preventing Hernandez and Parker from being inducted, though Raines would eventually be inducted in 2017. Parker would also eventually be inducted by the Classic Baseball Era Committee in 2024 (Class of 2025).

In 2015, the Pittsburgh drug trials were the subject of an ESPN 30 for 30 documentary.

== See also ==
- Black Sox Scandal
- BALCO scandal
- Biogenesis baseball scandal
