= Al Monchak =

American baseball player and coach (1917-2015)

- Shortstop
- Born: March 5, 1917; Bayonne, New Jersey, U.S.
- Died: September 12, 2015 (aged 98); Bradenton, Florida, U.S.
- Batted: Right Threw: Right

MLB debut
- June 22, 1940, for the Philadelphia Phillies

Last MLB appearance
- September 1, 1940, for the Philadelphia Phillies

MLB statistics
- Batting average: .143
- Home runs: 0
- Runs batted in: 0
- Stats at Baseball Reference

Teams
- Philadelphia Phillies (1940)

Alex Monchak (March 5, 1917 – September 12, 2015) was an American baseball shortstop who played briefly for the Philadelphia Phillies during the 1940 season. Listed at 6 feet 0 inches (1.83 m), 180 pounds (82 kg), he batted and threw right-handed. He was primarily known as the first-base coach for all the Major League Baseball (MLB) teams managed by Chuck Tanner from 1971 to 1988, including the 1979 World Series Champion Pittsburgh Pirates.

== Biography ==
Monchak was a native of Bayonne, New Jersey. He served in World War II, achieving the noncommissioned officer (NCO) rank of Staff Sergeant (S-SGT), the campaigns in which he served include Normandy, Northern France, Ardennes, Rhineland, and Central Europe receiving the following citations: American Theater Ribbon, European-African-Middle Eastern Ribbon, Good Conduct Medal, and Victory Medal, according to War Department Adjutant General's Office Form (WD AGO Form) 53-55 dated 1 November 1944 Box 32 Battles and Campaigns, Box 33 Decorations and Citations, and Box 38 Highest Grade Held. Before the war, his MLB career began as the shortstop with the Philadelphia Phillies in 1940. During the 1940 season, he was a .143 hitter (2-for-14) with one run and one stolen base in 19 games.

Following his military service, Monchak continued to pursue his childhood dream of a career in baseball by being on the field of play. He became a Minor League manager from 1949 to 1961, acting as a player/manager through 1956, and winning four championship titles. He later served as a scout and instructor in the California Angels system (1962–70). Both he and Joe Lonnett were named first- and third-base coaches respectively by manager Chuck Tanner with the Chicago White Sox on October 2, 1970. All three would serve in similar capacities together with the White Sox (1971–75), Oakland Athletics (1976) and Pittsburgh Pirates (1977–84). His childhood dream came true when he was the first base coach with the "We Are Family" Pirates in 1979, who became MLB World Champions. He continued as Tanner's first-base coach when he joined the Atlanta Braves on October 14, 1985, and would serve with the team from 1986 to 1988.

Monchak was named the 2009 winner of the Roland Hemond Award by Baseball America in December 2009. The award recognizes baseball figures who have made long-term contributions to scouting and player development operations.

Monchak died on September 12, 2015, at the age of 98. At the time of his death, he was recognized as the third oldest living Major League player.
