= Joe Lonnett =

American baseball player (1927–2011)

- Catcher
- Born: February 7, 1927; Beaver Falls, Pennsylvania, U.S.
- Died: December 5, 2011 (aged 84); Beaver Falls, Pennsylvania, U.S.
- Batted: Right Threw: Right

MLB debut
- April 22, 1956, for the Philadelphia Phillies

Last MLB appearance
- September 26, 1959, for the Philadelphia Phillies

MLB statistics
- Batting average: .166
- Home runs: 6
- Runs batted in: 27
- Stats at Baseball Reference

Teams
- As player: Philadelphia Phillies (1956–1959); As coach: Chicago White Sox (1971–1975); Oakland Athletics (1976); Pittsburgh Pirates (1977–1984)

Joseph Paul Lonnett (February 7, 1927 – December 5, 2011) was an American professional baseball catcher, and coach, who played in Major League Baseball (MLB) for the Philadelphia Phillies. During his playing days, Lonnett stood 5 feet 10 1/2 inches (1.791 m) tall, weighing 185 pounds (84 kg). He threw and batted right-handed.

== Playing career ==
Lonnett graduated from Beaver Falls High School and signed with the Phillies in 1948, and spent much of his career with the Phillies as a Minor League Baseball (MiLB) catcher and manager, and MLB catcher and scout. He missed two seasons while serving in the United States Navy in World War II and the Korean War. Lonnett spent four MLB seasons a second-string receiver, appearing in 143 games, while batting .166, with six home runs (HR) and 27 runs batted in (RBI) — never once cracking the .200 level for a season.

== Coaching career ==
Fellow Western Pennsylvania native Chuck Tanner had promised Lonnett that he would be one of his coaches if he ever became an MLB manager. Tanner honored his word when he named Lonnett and Al Monchak third- and first-base coaches respectively with the Chicago White Sox on October 2, 1970. All three would serve in similar capacities together with the White Sox (1971–75), Oakland Athletics (1976) and Pittsburgh Pirates (1977–84).

When Tanner was traded to the Pirates for Manny Sanguillén — only the second trade in MLB history to involve a manager — Lonnett followed him to Pittsburgh. He wore Sanguillén's No. 35 jersey until the Pirates re-acquired Sanguillén a year later; after which, he wore No. 32. Eventually, Lonnett served as third-base coach on the Pirates' 1979 world championship team.

In 1987, he was named the manager of the St. Catharines Blue Jays of the Short-Season 'A' affiliate of the Toronto Blue Jays in the New York–Penn League, which finished at 41–36, 4th in the NY–P Western Division.

== Later life and death ==
In the final years of his life, Lonnett battled Alzheimer's disease and was cared for by his wife of 56 years, Alvida. In 2004, he attended the 25th anniversary celebration of the 1979 World's Champs, at PNC Park.

Lonnett succumbed to his long-standing illness, in his home town of Beaver Falls, Pennsylvania, on December 5, 2011. He was 84.

Preceded by Bill Adair	Chicago White Sox third base coach 1971–1975	Succeeded by Jim Busby
Preceded by Bobby Winkles	Oakland Athletics third base coach 1976	Succeeded by Cal Ermer
Preceded by Jose Pagan	Pittsburgh Pirates third base coach 1977–1984	Succeeded by Bob Skinner
