= Alfonso Pulido =

Mexican baseball player (born 1957)

- Pitcher
- Born: January 23, 1957 (age 69); Tierra Blanca, Veracruz, Mexico
- Batted: Left Threw: Left

MLB debut
- September 5, 1983, for the Pittsburgh Pirates

Last MLB appearance
- September 1, 1986, for the New York Yankees

MLB statistics
- Win–loss record: 1–1
- Earned run average: 5.19
- Strikeouts: 16
- Stats at Baseball Reference

Teams
- Pittsburgh Pirates (1983–1984); New York Yankees (1986)

Alfonso Pulido Manzo (born January 23, 1957) is a Mexican former Major League Baseball pitcher. Pulido played parts of three seasons in Major League Baseball, with the Pittsburgh Pirates in 1983–1984 and with the New York Yankees in 1986, appearing in 12 career games with a 1–1 record.

Before signing with Major League Baseball, Pulido originally pitched for the Mexico City Reds of the Mexican League. In 1983, he won 17 games for the Reds while only losing three. After winning three games in the Mexican League playoffs, the Pittsburgh Pirates signed him to a contract, and brought him into the major leagues at the end of August 1983, saying that he had "Valenzuela-type stuff". He made his major league debut on September 5 against the St. Louis Cardinals, pitching the first two innings of the game and allowing two earned runs in his only appearance that season. He spent most of the 1984 season in the minor leagues with the Hawaii Islanders, winning 18 games, losing six, and posting an earned run average (ERA) of 2.54. In his lone major league appearance of 1984, he pitched for two innings against the Cardinals, allowing two runs on three hits. On December 20, 1984, Pulido was traded by the Pirates, along with Dale Berra and Jay Buhner, to the New York Yankees for Tim Foli, Steve Kemp and cash.

Pulido spent the 1985 season with the Columbus Clippers in the Yankees' minor league system. He played in 31 games for the Clippers, finishing the season with 11 wins, eight losses, and a 3.39 ERA. In 1986, Pulido spent some time on the major league squad. After starting the season in the minors, the Yankees placed Tommy John on the injured list with a strained achilles tendon and recalled Pulido in June. He made his season debut later that month and pitched ten games in his final major league season. He played his final major league game on September 1, finishing the season with a win and a loss in ten appearances, with a 4.70 ERA. He spent the full 1987 season with the Clippers, playing in 34 games, winning nine and losing five.

After 1987, Pulido returned to the Mexican League, and by 1990 he was out of baseball.
