= Juiced (book) =

2005 book by Jose Canseco

Juiced: Wild Times, Rampant 'Roids, Smash Hits & How Baseball Got Big
- Author: Jose Canseco
- Language: English
- Publisher: Regan Books
- Publication date: 2005
- ISBN: 0-06-074640-8

Juiced: Wild Times, Rampant 'Roids, Smash Hits & How Baseball Got Big is a 2005 book by Jose Canseco and his personal account of steroid usage in Major League Baseball. The book is autobiographical, and it focuses on Canseco's days as a major leaguer, his marriages, his daughter, and off-field incidents including his barroom brawl in 2001. The book deals primarily with anabolic steroids, drawing upon the personal experiences of Canseco. He takes personal credit for introducing steroids to baseball and names former teammates Mark McGwire, Juan González, Rafael Palmeiro, Iván Rodríguez, and Jason Giambi as fellow steroid users. He also believes he was blackballed by baseball when Bud Selig decided that the league needed to be cleaned up.

One of Juiced's central precepts is that steroid use is not in and of itself a bad thing, as long as the person is being monitored by a physician and the dosages are small. Canseco believes that steroids can not only improve the game of baseball but also improve and lengthen lives and that more research needs to be done on the topic. Canseco claims to discredit many of the myths regarding steroids, asserting that they do not break down a person's body if used correctly and can actually help a person recover quickly from injuries. During the A&E Network's one-hour documentary, Jose Canseco: The Last Shot, Canseco said he "regrets mentioning players [as steroid users]. I never realized this was going to blow up and hurt so many people."

== Other topics in Juiced ==
- Canseco discusses his relationship with Madonna, claiming that she was infatuated with him and that he was never really interested in her.
- Canseco details his opinions on different managers, including Tony La Russa, Joe Torre, and Dusty Baker.
- Canseco claims that, when he failed his drug test in 2003, it was a setup by Major League Baseball. MLB wanted him discredited because he was "the godfather of steroids" and could be damaging to the game.
- Canseco claims that, when he was arrested for domestic violence for fighting with his first wife, the two were arguing while driving on the highway, and that he accidentally hit her car.
- Canseco discusses his life on the road relating to women.
- Although Canseco accused Roger Clemens of steroid use, he extolls Clemens' apparent marital fidelity, saying that Clemens was "one of the very few baseball players I know who never cheated on his wife." However, reports of an alleged Clemens affair with country singer Mindy McCready surfaced in 2008, followed by allegations of four other extramarital affairs.
- Canseco says that he met his second wife at a Hooters in Cleveland, Ohio.
- Canseco claims to have once run a 3.9 second 40-yard dash, which would be the fastest time ever recorded.

== See also ==
- Banned substances in baseball
- Vindicated
