= Pretrial Intervention Program =

The Pretrial Intervention Program (PTI) is a program targeted at providing first-time offenders charged with non-violent crimes with an opportunity to avoid the crippling consequences often associated with a felony criminal conviction, and attempts to relieve some of the burden on the criminal justice system caused by such offenders. The program renders early rehabilitative services and aims to deter future criminal behavior. Many states have similar programs employed under a variety of names.

== Program ==
In New Jersey, the program allows eligible first-time offenders who have (typically) been charged with certain third- or fourth-degree crimes to seek admission into the program. If granted, defendants are placed under court supervision for a period lasting between one and three years. During this probationary period, the participant may be subject to random urine monitoring, fines, and other penalties depending on the nature of the alleged criminal action. Successful completion of the PTI program is often contingent upon performance of community service, timely payment of restitution, and/or strict compliance with the requirements of a prescribed treatment regimen. These treatments may include psychological counseling, drug and alcohol rehabilitation programs, and other recovery services.

Successful completion of the PTI program requirements results in the complete expungement of the criminal charges that would have otherwise become a part of the defendant's criminal record, had they entered a guilty plea or been convicted at trial. This benefit can be valuable in terms of the increased range of accessible opportunities for new jobs, housing, etc. when compared to the restricted opportunities presented to persons living with a felony conviction on their records.

The New Jersey Pretrial Application form consists of two pages.

=== Standard Conditions of PTI ===
There are "standard" conditions that apply to all NJ PTI participants.

Standard PTI conditions include the following:

1. Remain arrest-free - you cannot pick up new charges;
2. You must report to your probation officer;
3. You must be honest with your probation officer;
4. Your probation must be allowed to visit you;
5. You must report any address change;
6. You must seek permission to move out of state;
7. You must maintain employment;
8. You must cooperate with any treatment your probation officer deems necessary

=== Special Conditions of PTI ===
In addition to the standard conditions discussed above, you may have "special conditions" placed on you.

Special conditions include the following:

1. Loss of driving privileges;
2. Drug testing;
3. Alcohol testing;
4. Drug Counseling;
5. Alcohol Counseling;
6. Psychological testing;
7. Psychological Counseling

In 2014, American football running back, Ray Rice, was granted PTI despite being indicted on third degree assault. This result occurs in less than 1% of domestic assault charges.

== See also ==
- Accelerated Rehabilitative Disposition
- Pretrial services programs
- New Jersey PTI: Everything You Need To Know In 5 Minutes
