= Chris Green (baseball) =

American baseball player (born 1960)

- Pitcher
- Born: September 5, 1960 (age 65); Los Angeles, California, U.S.
- Batted: Right Threw: Right

MLB debut
- April 17, 1984, for the Pittsburgh Pirates

Last MLB appearance
- August 18, 1984, for the Pittsburgh Pirates

MLB statistics
- Win–loss record: 0–0
- Earned run average: 6.00
- Strikeouts: 3
- Stats at Baseball Reference

Teams
- Pittsburgh Pirates (1984)

Christopher DeWayne Green (born September 5, 1960) is an American former professional baseball pitcher. Green played for the Pittsburgh Pirates of the Major League Baseball (MLB) in 1984.

Green attended Dorsey High School in Los Angeles, California.
