= Ray Krawczyk =

American baseball player (born 1959)

- Relief pitcher
- Born: October 9, 1959 (age 66); Sewickley, Pennsylvania, U.S.
- Batted: Right Threw: Right

MLB debut
- June 29, 1984, for the Pittsburgh Pirates

Last MLB appearance
- April 28, 1989, for the Milwaukee Brewers

MLB statistics
- Win–loss record: 0–4
- Earned run average: 7.05
- Strikeouts: 42
- Stats at Baseball Reference

Teams
- Pittsburgh Pirates (1984–1986); California Angels (1988); Milwaukee Brewers (1989)

Raymond Allen Krawczyk (born October 9, 1959) is an American former professional baseball player who played five seasons for the Pittsburgh Pirates, California Angels, and Milwaukee Brewers of Major League Baseball (MLB).

Krawczyk was born in Pennsylvania in 1959 but moved with his family to California five years later. He attended Bolsa Grande High School in California and played college baseball at Golden West College and then Oral Roberts.

Krawczyk has worked as a scout for the San Francisco Giants and a youth baseball coach in California.
