= Doug Frobel =

Canadian baseball player (born 1959)

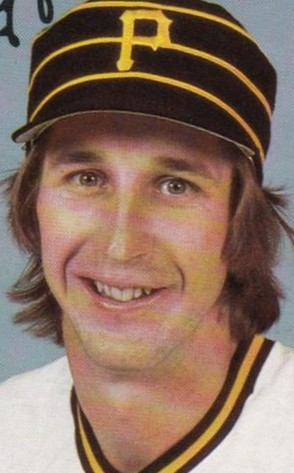
- Right fielder
- Born: June 6, 1959 (age 66); Nepean, Ontario, Canada
- Batted: Left Threw: Right

MLB debut
- September 5, 1982, for the Pittsburgh Pirates

Last MLB appearance
- August 23, 1987, for the Cleveland Indians

MLB statistics
- Batting average: .201
- Home runs: 20
- Runs batted in: 58
- Stats at Baseball Reference

Teams
- Pittsburgh Pirates (1982–1985); Montreal Expos (1985); Cleveland Indians (1987)

Douglas Steven Frobel (born June 6, 1959) is a Canadian former professional baseball player. An outfielder, he appeared in 268 Major League games over five seasons (1982–1985; 1987). He batted left-handed, threw right-handed, stood 6 feet 4 inches (1.93 m) tall and weighed 196 pounds (89 kg).

Signed as an amateur free agent in 1977, Frobel was developed in the Pittsburgh Pirates' farm system to take over the starting right fielder position from Dave Parker in 1984, after he batted .304 with 24 home runs and 80 runs batted in for the Triple-A Hawaii Islanders in 1983.

Prone to strikeouts, Frobel never played regularly but had a career high of 12 home runs in 126 games played in 1984.

In 607 MLB plate appearances and 542 at bats, Frobel registered 109 hits and 155 strikeouts.

A park in Nepean, Ontario was named after him.
