= Jeff Zaske =

American baseball player (born 1960)

- Pitcher
- Born: October 6, 1960 (age 65); Seattle, Washington
- Batted: Right Threw: Right

MLB debut
- July 21, 1984, for the Pittsburgh Pirates

Last MLB appearance
- July 28, 1984, for the Pittsburgh Pirates

MLB statistics
- Win–loss record: 0–0
- Earned run average: 0.00
- Strikeouts: 2
- Stats at Baseball Reference

Teams
- Pittsburgh Pirates (1984)

Lloyd Jeffery Zaske (born October 6, 1960) is an American former professional baseball pitcher. Zaske appeared in three games in Major League Baseball for the Pittsburgh Pirates in 1984 at the age of 23. He batted right-handed and threw right-handed. He was born in Seattle, Washington.
