= Rod Scurry =

American baseball player (1956–1992)

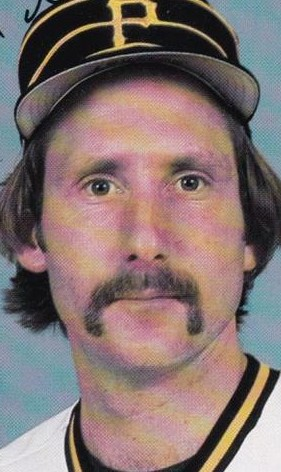
- Pitcher
- Born: March 17, 1956; Sacramento, California, U.S.
- Died: November 5, 1992 (aged 36); Reno, Nevada, U.S.
- Batted: Left Threw: Left

MLB debut
- April 17, 1980, for the Pittsburgh Pirates

Last MLB appearance
- September 30, 1988, for the Seattle Mariners

MLB statistics
- Win–loss record: 19–32
- Earned run average: 3.24
- Strikeouts: 431
- Stats at Baseball Reference

Teams
- Pittsburgh Pirates (1980–1985); New York Yankees (1985–1986); Seattle Mariners (1988)

Rodney Grant Scurry (March 17, 1956 – November 5, 1992) was an American professional baseball pitcher. Scurry was born to Preston Brooks and Betty Jane (Handy)-Scurry in Sacramento, CA. Scurry played for eight seasons and was the first Major League Baseball (MLB) player directly linked to the Pittsburgh drug trials that dogged baseball during the mid-1980s. In 1992, Scurry died of a cocaine-induced heart attack.

== Career ==
=== Pittsburgh Pirates ===
Scurry was born in Sacramento, California and was drafted by the Pittsburgh Pirates with the eleventh overall pick in the 1974 Major League Baseball draft. He spent six seasons in the Pirates' farm system, compiling a 37–51 record and 3.89 earned run average, before making the major league club out of Spring training 1980.

Though he had been used primarily as a starter in the minors, Scurry spent most of his major-league career as a relief pitcher. The only exception was 1981 when he was added to the Pirates' starting rotation. He won his first start on April 19, giving up four hits and no earned runs in seven innings pitched.

From there, Scurry went 0–2 with a 5.79 ERA over his next four starts (the Pirates were 0–2 in his no-decisions), and he was returned to the bullpen. He made two more starts in August, winning one and losing one. For the season, he went 4–5 with a 3.77 ERA and seven saves. In 1982, he appeared in 76 games for the Pirates and went 4–5 with a 1.74 ERA and fourteen saves.

On September 14, 1985, his contract was sold to the New York Yankees.

=== New York Yankees ===
During his time with the Yankees, Scurry went 2–2 with a 3.46 ERA in 36 appearances over a season plus with the team. He was released shortly before the 1987 season. He signed with the San Francisco Giants in June and spent the entire season with their triple-A affiliate.

=== Seattle Mariners ===
During Spring training 1988, the Giants dealt Scurry to the Seattle Mariners for a player to be named later. After starting the season in the minors, he joined the team in May and went 0–2 with a 4.02 ERA and two saves. The Mariners released Scurry on December 21, 1988. A day later, he was arrested for buying crack cocaine at a Reno, Nevada crack house.

== Personal life and death ==
On October 29, 1992, responding to a call from a neighbor, the Washoe County, Nevada Sheriff's Department found Scurry outside his home complaining that snakes were in his home, crawling on him and biting him. He became violent and stopped breathing when deputies attempted to put handcuffs and leg restraints on him. He was taken to Washoe Medical Center and remained on life-support systems until his death a week later. His official cause of death was a cocaine-related heart attack.

His son, Rod Jr., was a pitcher in the Colorado Rockies organization.

=== Pittsburgh drug trials ===
Scurry had admitted, prior to his death, to purchasing cocaine on at least 19 occasions during the 1982 and 1983 seasons. On August 19, 1985, he became the first player directly named in the cocaine distribution trial of Curtis Strong. He and Pirates teammates Dale Berra, Lee Lacy, Lee Mazzilli, John Milner and Dave Parker, along with several other notable major league players, were called before a Pittsburgh grand jury for their involvement in the Pittsburgh drug scandal. Their testimony led to the drug trials, which made national headlines in September 1985. He and the other players brought before the Pittsburgh Grand Jury were granted immunity from prosecution in exchange for testimony.
