= Dale Berra =

American baseball player (born 1956)

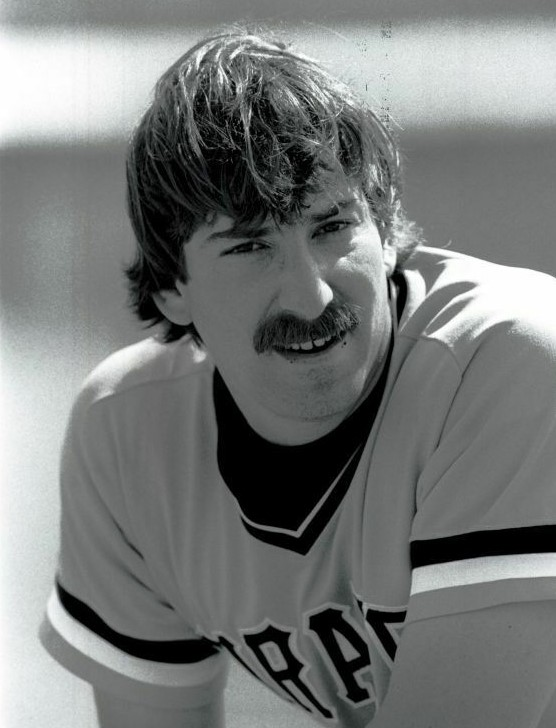
- Berra with the Pirates in 1984
- Shortstop / Third baseman
- Born: December 13, 1956 (age 69); Ridgewood, New Jersey, U.S.
- Batted: Right Threw: Right

MLB debut
- August 22, 1977, for the Pittsburgh Pirates

Last MLB appearance
- October 4, 1987, for the Houston Astros

MLB statistics
- Batting average: .236
- Home runs: 49
- Runs batted in: 278
- Stats at Baseball Reference

Teams
- Pittsburgh Pirates (1977–1984); New York Yankees (1985–1986); Houston Astros (1987)

Dale Anthony Berra (born December 13, 1956) is an American former Major League Baseball player who primarily played as an infielder from 1977 to 1987. He is the son of Hall of Fame catcher Yogi Berra and brother of former Baltimore Colts return specialist Tim Berra.

== Early years ==
Dale was named after Dale Mitchell, who had made the final out in Don Larsen's perfect game two months earlier, when he took a called third strike that was caught by Yogi.

Berra was a highly sought prospect upon his graduation from Montclair High School in Montclair, New Jersey. He was drafted by the Pittsburgh Pirates with the twentieth overall pick in the 1975 Major League Baseball draft, and made his major-league debut on August 22, 1977, at the age of twenty.

== Pittsburgh Pirates ==
Berra was a member of the 1979 World Series champion Pirates, although he did not play in the postseason. A third baseman in the minor leagues, Berra earned playing time at third, second and shortstop his first five seasons in the majors before being handed the starting shortstop job in 1982. That season, he enjoyed career highs in batting average (.263), hits (139), runs scored (64) and runs batted in (61). In 1983, he set the record for reaching base on catcher's interference with seven.

== New York Yankees ==
Yogi Berra was named manager of the Yankees prior to the start of the 1984 season. Following the season, the Yankees acquired the younger Berra, along with Jay Buhner and Alfonso Pulido for Steve Kemp and Tim Foli, whom Berra had replaced as the Pirates starting shortstop. Dale became the first son to play for his father in the major leagues since Earle Mack who appeared in five games for the Philadelphia Athletics from 1910 through 1914 under Connie Mack. Dale was batting .343 until his father was fired sixteen games into the 1985 season and replaced by Billy Martin. Under Martin, Dale was returned to a back-up infielder role, and his batting average fell to .229 for the season.

The most notable play of Berra's career was a bizarre baserunning gaffe involving himself and Bobby Meacham. It came in an 11-inning 6–5 loss to the Chicago White Sox at Yankee Stadium on August 2, 1985. With Meacham and Berra the runners at second and first base respectively in the seventh inning of a game tied at three, Rickey Henderson hit a ball that rolled to the farthest reaches of left-center field. When Meacham slipped between second and third base, both runners ended up approaching home plate in synchronized fashion, one on the heels of the other. After catching the relay throw from shortstop Ozzie Guillén, catcher Carlton Fisk tagged out Meacham to his right, then turned to his left just a split second later to do the same to Berra to complete the double play. Martin commented, "I've never seen that in grammar school, much less a major-league game."

== Pittsburgh drug trials ==
On September 9, 1985, Berra testified during the cocaine distribution trial of Curtis Strong that he shared cocaine with other members of the Pirates.

On February 28, 1986, Baseball Commissioner Peter Ueberroth suspended several players including Berra. The suspensions were waived with a commitment for community service and donations of 10% of their salaries for one year.

== Houston Astros ==
Lou Piniella was named the Yankees' manager in 1986 and Berra was released on July 27. Shortly afterwards, he was signed by the Houston Astros where Yogi Berra was a coach. Dale spent the rest of the 1986 season with Houston's triple-A affiliate.

After spending most of 1987 with triple-A Tucson, Berra debuted with the Astros on August 15. He batted .178 in 19 games for the Astros, and was released at the end of the season. He spent the 1988 season in the Baltimore Orioles' system before retiring.

== Personal life ==
Berra began using cocaine recreationally, introduced to it by friends during one offseason, early in his major league career. It was only in retrospect that he came to realize that it affected his play even at that early stage. Eventually he spiraled into an addiction, which Berra blames for his baseball career never blossoming into starhood.

A resident of Glen Ridge, New Jersey, Berra was charged in April 1989 with cocaine possession as part of an investigation into a drug ring that was distributing as much as $20,000 in cocaine weekly in northern New Jersey. He was convicted of cocaine-related charges later that year, whereupon his first marriage ended in divorce.

After three years in the Pretrial Intervention Program, the drug charges were dismissed. His cocaine use, however, continued until 1992, when a family intervention organized by his father, Yogi, made it clear that Dale's relationship with his family was in jeopardy if he continued to use drugs. Dale says that he not only stopped using right then, but actually lost his appetite for both drugs and alcohol on the spot, never to dabble again.

Dale Berra went on to remarry, to wife Jane, with whom he raised two daughters, born c. 2005 and c. 2007.

In 1990, Berra was running a construction company in Cranford, New Jersey.

He is one of the principals of LTD Enterprises, which controls the brand image of his father.

At the time of his retirement, Berra had played more games than any son of a Hall-of-Famer, topping Dick Sisler (853 to 799). This record was later broken by Vladimir Guerrero Jr.

Dale is the youngest of three boys. His oldest brother, Larry, played briefly in the New York Mets organization. Middle brother Tim played with the Baltimore Colts in 1974.

== See also ==
- List of second-generation Major League Baseball players
- List of sportspeople sanctioned for doping offenses
