= 1984 in baseball =

The following are the baseball events of the year 1984 throughout the world.

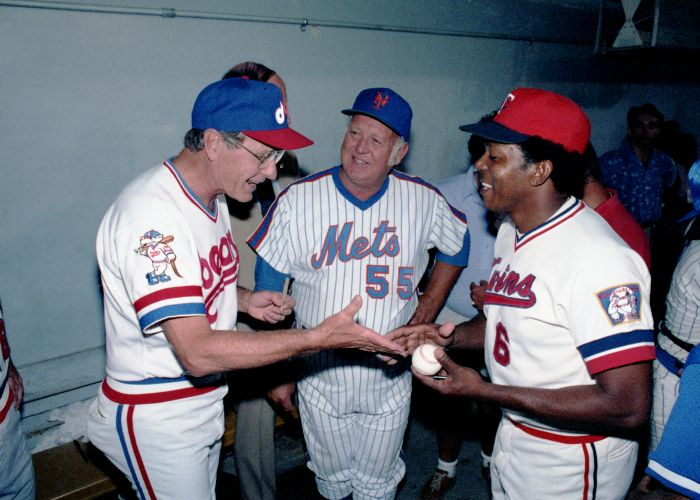
Vice President George H. W. Bush prepares to sign a baseball for Tony Oliva at an Old-Timers game in Denver in 1984. Bill Monbouquette looks on.

== Champions ==
=== Major League Baseball ===
- World Series: Detroit Tigers over San Diego Padres (4–1); Alan Trammell, MVP

League Championship Series (ALCS, NLCS)
East	Detroit	3
West	Kansas City	0
East	Chicago Cubs	2
West	San Diego	3

World Series
AL	Detroit	4
NL	San Diego	1

- American League Championship Series MVP: Kirk Gibson
- National League Championship Series MVP: Steve Garvey
- All-Star Game, July 10 at Candlestick Park: National League, 3–1; Gary Carter, MVP

=== Other champions ===
- Amateur World Series: Cuba
- Caribbean World Series: Águilas del Zulia (Venezuela)
- College World Series: Cal State-Fullerton
- Japan Series: Hiroshima Toyo Carp over Hankyu Braves (4–3)
- Korean Series: Lotte Giants over Samsung Lions
- Big League World Series: Taipei, Taiwan
- Junior League World Series: Pearl City, Hawaii
- Little League World Series: Seoul National, Seoul, South Korea
- Senior League World Series: Altamonte Springs, Florida
- Summer Olympic Games at Los Angeles (demonstration sport): Japan (1st), United States (2nd), Chinese Taipei (3rd)

== Awards and honors ==
- Baseball Hall of Fame
  - Luis Aparicio
  - Don Drysdale
  - Rick Ferrell
  - Harmon Killebrew
  - Pee Wee Reese

Baseball Writers' Association of America Awards
BBWAA Award	National League	American League
Rookie of the Year	Dwight Gooden (NYM)	Alvin Davis (SEA)
Cy Young Award	Rick Sutcliffe (CHC)	Willie Hernández (DET)
Manager of the Year	Jim Frey (CHC)	Sparky Anderson (DET)
Most Valuable Player	Ryne Sandberg (CHC)	Willie Hernández (DET)
Babe Ruth Award (World Series MVP)	—	Jack Morris (DET)
Gold Glove Awards
Position	National League	American League
Pitcher	Joaquín Andújar (STL)	Ron Guidry (NYY)
Catcher	Tony Peña (PIT)	Lance Parrish (DET)
First Baseman	Keith Hernandez (NYM)	Eddie Murray (BAL)
Second Baseman	Ryne Sandberg (CHC)	Lou Whitaker (DET)
Third Baseman	Mike Schmidt (PHI)	Buddy Bell (TEX)
Shortstop	Ozzie Smith (STL)	Alan Trammell (DET)
Outfielders	Andre Dawson (MON)	Dwight Evans (BOS)
Outfielders	Bob Dernier (CHC)	Dwayne Murphy (OAK)
Outfielders	Dale Murphy (ATL)	Dave Winfield (NYY)

- Woman Executive of the Year (major or minor league)
  - Mildred Boyenga, Waterloo Indians, Midwest League

== Statistical leaders ==
	American League		National League	
Stat	Player	Total	Player	Total
AVG	Don Mattingly (NYY)	.343	Tony Gwynn (SD)	.351
HR	Tony Armas (BOS)	43	Dale Murphy (ATL); Mike Schmidt (PHI)	36
RBI	Tony Armas (BOS)	123	Gary Carter (MON); Mike Schmidt (PHI)	106
W	Mike Boddicker (BAL)	20	Joaquín Andújar (STL)	20
ERA	Mike Boddicker (BAL)	2.79	Alejandro Peña (LAD)	2.48
K	Mark Langston (SEA)	204	Dwight Gooden (NYM)	276

== Major league baseball final standings ==
=== American League final standings ===
AL East
Team	W	L	Pct.	GB	Home	Road
^{(1)} Detroit Tigers	104	58	.642	—	53‍–‍29	51‍–‍29
Toronto Blue Jays	89	73	.549	15	49‍–‍32	40‍–‍41
New York Yankees	87	75	.537	17	51‍–‍30	36‍–‍45
Boston Red Sox	86	76	.531	18	41‍–‍40	45‍–‍36
Baltimore Orioles	85	77	.525	19	44‍–‍37	41‍–‍40
Cleveland Indians	75	87	.463	29	41‍–‍39	34‍–‍48
Milwaukee Brewers	67	94	.416	36½	38‍–‍43	29‍–‍51

AL West
Team	W	L	Pct.	GB	Home	Road
^{(2)} Kansas City Royals	84	78	.519	—	44‍–‍37	40‍–‍41
California Angels	81	81	.500	3	37‍–‍44	44‍–‍37
Minnesota Twins	81	81	.500	3	47‍–‍34	34‍–‍47
Oakland Athletics	77	85	.475	7	44‍–‍37	33‍–‍48
Chicago White Sox	74	88	.457	10	43‍–‍38	31‍–‍50
Seattle Mariners	74	88	.457	10	42‍–‍39	32‍–‍49
Texas Rangers	69	92	.429	14½	34‍–‍46	35‍–‍46

Locations of teams for the 1982–1988 American League seasons
West East

=== National League final standings ===
NL East
Team	W	L	Pct.	GB	Home	Road
^{(1)} Chicago Cubs	96	65	.596	—	51‍–‍29	45‍–‍36
New York Mets	90	72	.556	6½	48‍–‍33	42‍–‍39
St. Louis Cardinals	84	78	.519	12½	44‍–‍37	40‍–‍41
Philadelphia Phillies	81	81	.500	15½	39‍–‍42	42‍–‍39
Montreal Expos	78	83	.484	18	39‍–‍42	39‍–‍41
Pittsburgh Pirates	75	87	.463	21½	41‍–‍40	34‍–‍47

NL West
Team	W	L	Pct.	GB	Home	Road
^{(2)} San Diego Padres	92	70	.568	—	48‍–‍33	44‍–‍37
Atlanta Braves	80	82	.494	12	38‍–‍43	42‍–‍39
Houston Astros	80	82	.494	12	43‍–‍38	37‍–‍44
Los Angeles Dodgers	79	83	.488	13	40‍–‍41	39‍–‍42
Cincinnati Reds	70	92	.432	22	39‍–‍42	31‍–‍50
San Francisco Giants	66	96	.407	26	35‍–‍46	31‍–‍50

Locations of teams for the 1977–1992 National League seasons
West East

== Nippon Professional Baseball final standings ==
=== Central League final standings ===
Central League
Team	G	W	L	T	Pct.	GB
Hiroshima Toyo Carp	130	75	45	10	.625	–
Chunichi Dragons	130	73	49	8	.598	3.0
Yomiuri Giants	130	67	54	9	.554	8.5
Hanshin Tigers	130	53	69	8	.434	23.0
Yakult Swallows	130	51	71	8	.418	25.0
Yokohama Taiyo Whales	130	46	77	7	.374	30.5

=== Pacific League final standings ===
Pacific League
Team	G	W	L	T	Pct.	GB
Hankyu Braves	130	75	45	10	.625	–
Lotte Orions	130	64	51	15	.557	8.5
Seibu Lions	130	62	61	7	.504	14.5
Kintetsu Buffaloes	130	58	61	11	.487	16.5
Nankai Hawks	130	53	65	12	.449	21.0
Nippon-Ham Fighters	130	44	73	13	.376	29.5

== Events ==
=== January ===
- January 5 – The New York Yankees sign pitcher Phil Niekro, a future Baseball Hall of Famer who won 268 games during his two decades (1964–1983) with the Milwaukee/Atlanta Braves. Niekro, 44, was unconditionally released by the Braves last October 7.
- January 6 – The San Diego Padres sign future Cooperstown inductee Goose Gossage, 32. The fireballing relief pitcher and seven-time MLB All-Star had been granted free agency from the Yankees last November 7.
- January 8 – Another member of November's free agent class, second baseman Julio Cruz, decides to return to the Chicago White Sox. Cruz' mid-June acquisition helped spark the ChiSox to the 1983 AL West title.
- January 10:
  - Luis Aparicio, Don Drysdale and Harmon Killebrew are elected to the Baseball Hall of Fame by the Baseball Writers' Association of America.
  - The Toronto Blue Jays sign relief pitcher Dennis Lamp, granted free agency from the Chicago White Sox last November.

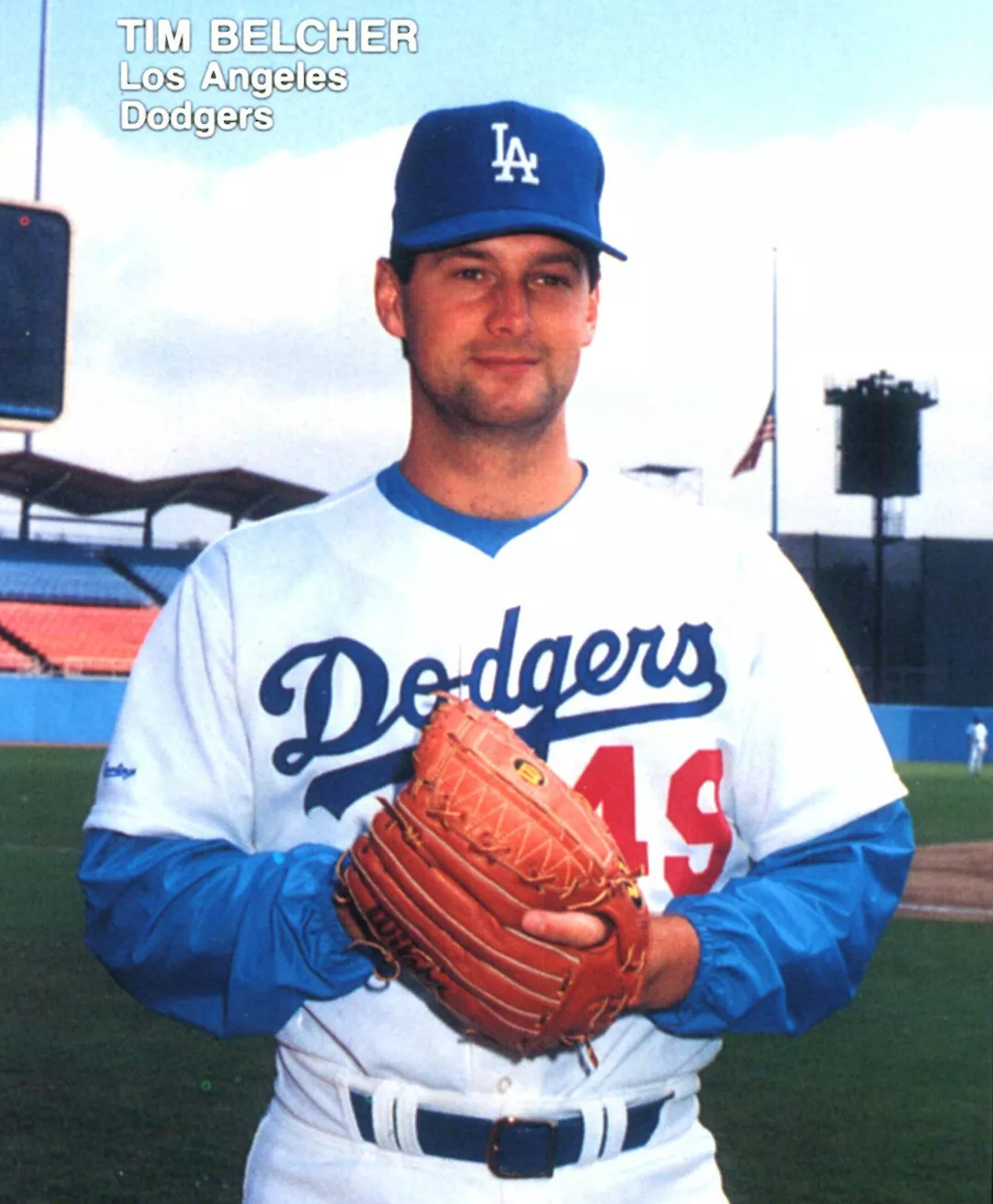
Tim Belcher as a Dodger (1988)

- January 17 – Tim Belcher, the #1 overall selection in the June 1983 amateur draft who spurned the low-paying Minnesota Twins' contract offer, is selected first overall by the New York Yankees in the secondary phase of the 1984 January amateur draft. The right-handed pitcher signs on January 31, but his tenure as a Yankee will be a very brief one.
- January 20:
  - The Chicago White Sox select New York Mets' pitching legend Tom Seaver from the available player pool as compensation for the loss of Type-A free-agent Dennis Lamp on January 10. The Mets' ownership and front office, who believed it was unnecessary to protect a 39-year-old pitcher, are described as "distraught" and "devastated" by the White Sox' maneuver. Says general manager Frank Cashen: "We made a calculated and regrettable gamble." Says a shocked Seaver: "My alternatives are to retire, or not to report and wait for the White Sox to trade me, or to negotiate a contract and play in Chicago. I honestly don't know what I'm going to do."
  - Continuing his chase of Ty Cobb's all-time hits record, free-agent Pete Rose, 42, signs with the Montreal Expos. Rose is 202 hits short of Cobb's mark.
- January 26 – Outfielder Steve Henderson, who was granted free agency from the Seattle Mariners last November 7, signs a one-year, $400,000 contract to return to the Mariners.

=== February ===
- February 5 – The Cleveland Indians trade veteran third baseman Toby Harrah and a player to be named later (PTBNL) (pitcher Rick Browne) to the New York Yankees for pitcher George Frazier, outfielder Otis Nixon, and a PTBNL (pitcher Guy Elston). The Yankees plan to platoon Harrah, 35 and a four-time former AL All-Star, with left-handed-hitting team captain and 5x All-Star Graig Nettles, 39.
- February 7 – The Oakland Athletics lose Type-A free agent Tom Underwood when the veteran left-handed pitcher signs with the Baltimore Orioles. Under the terms of the collective bargaining agreement that followed the 1981 MLB strike, Oakland is entitled to compensation from a pool of players designated by all MLB clubs who have opted into pursuing Type-A free agents.
- February 8 – The controversial Type-A free agent compensation provision in the CBA, which frustrated the New York Mets last month, now thwarts Gotham's American League team. One day after Tom Underwood's departure, the Athletics select pitcher Tim Belcher from the New York Yankees as repayment. Belcher, the #1 overall pick in the 1983 June draft who went unsigned by the tight-fisted Minnesota Twins, had been chosen by the Yankees three weeks earlier, on January 17, in the 1984 January draft's secondary phase; he had then inked a Bombers' contract on January 31. But because the Yankees' compensation draft protected list did not contain Belcher's name—it had been submitted on January 13, when Belcher was still an amateur free agent—the coveted young right-hander is considered eligible for the lottery. Outraged, the Yankees protest to the Commissioner's Office; the Major League Baseball Players Association is also angered by the situation. But Belcher's agent, Scott Boras, declines to file a grievance, and Lee MacPhail, now chair of the MLB Player Relations Committee, rules in Oakland's favor. Ironically, Belcher never pitches for the Athletics; they trade him to the Los Angeles Dodgers in 1987 and he'll win 146 games over 14 seasons for seven MLB clubs.
- February 17 – The Houston Astros sign free-agent former NL All-Star J.R. Richard, who is continuing his comeback attempt after suffering a stroke in July 1980. Richard, now 33, went 107–71 (3.15) in 238 games over ten seasons for the Astros and fanned over 300 batters in a season twice before his illness. He had sat out 1981, then made 21 appearances during 1982 and 1983 in Houston's farm system trying to regain his effectiveness before being granted free agency last November 7. However, Richard's 1984 comeback attempt will end when the Astros release him April 27.
- February 21 – After placing him on waivers 11 days earlier, the Los Angeles Dodgers release outfielder Dusty Baker, 34, after his eighth season with the team. He will accept a spring training invitation from the San Francisco Giants.
- February 27 – The Montreal Expos trade seven-time All-Star Al Oliver to the Giants for pitchers Fred Breining and Andy McGaffigan (PTBNL) and outfielder Max Venable. Oliver, 37, led the National League in hits (204), doubles (43), runs batted in (109), and batting average (.331) in 1982, and was the NL's starting first baseman in the 1983 Midsummer Classic.

=== March ===
- March 3 – MLB owners unanimously elect Peter Ueberroth to a five-year term as the sixth Commissioner of Baseball, after agreeing to strengthen the powers of the office. Ueberroth, 46, is the president of the Los Angeles Olympic Organizing Committee. After the Summer Olympics (July 28 through August 12, 1984) conclude, Ueberroth will begin his term as Commissioner on October 1, with incumbent Bowie Kuhn remaining on the job until then.

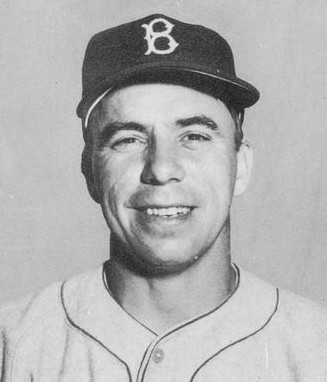
Pee Wee Reese (1956)

- March 8 – Shortstop Pee Wee Reese and catcher Rick Ferrell are elected to the Hall of Fame by the Special Veterans Committee. Reese hit .269 in 16 seasons with the Brooklyn/Los Angeles Dodgers; Ferrell batted .281 and set an American League record for games caught (1,806; since broken by Carlton Fisk) over 18 seasons for the St. Louis Browns, Boston Red Sox and Washington Senators.
- March 17 – Future Hall-of-Fame pitcher Ferguson Jenkins, a six-time 20-game-winner who went 284–226 (3.34) over 19 MLB seasons, is released by the Chicago Cubs, for whom he won 167 contests. The 41-year-old captured the 1971 National League Cy Young Award and was named to three NL All-Star teams.
- March 24 – In perhaps the most eventful transaction of the 1984 season, the Detroit Tigers acquire relief pitcher Willie Hernández, along with platoon first baseman Dave Bergman, from the defending NL champion Philadelphia Phillies for young outfielder Glenn Wilson and catcher John Wockenfuss. Southpaw Hernández, 29, will become Detroit's shutdown closer, posting a 9–3 (1.92) record and 32 saves in a league-leading 80 games pitched; he'll be selected an All-Star, win the American League MVP and Cy Young awards, and a World Series championship ring.
- March 26:
  - In the larger of two deals they make today, the Chicago Cubs obtain pitcher Porfi Altamirano and outfielders Bob Dernier and Gary Matthews from the Philadelphia Phillies for pitcher Bill Campbell and outfielder/first baseman Mike Diaz. Matthews, 33, becomes the Cubs' left-fielder and a clubhouse presence, and leads the NL in on-base percentage. Dernier, 27, takes over the center-field job, steals 45 bases, and scores 94 runs, third on the team.
  - The Cubs also pick up veteran relief pitcher Tim Stoddard, 31, from the Oakland Athletics for two minor-league players, pitcher Stan Kyles and outfielder Stan Broderick. Stoddard will win ten games and save seven others (second only to Lee Smith's 33) coming out of the Chicago bullpen in 1984.
- March 29 – On the same day that they drop outfielder Mitchell Page, the Athletics sign Dave Kingman, released on January 30 by the New York Mets.
- March 30 – The New York Yankees trade unhappy third baseman and team captain Graig Nettles to his hometown San Diego Padres for southpaw pitcher Dennis Rasmussen and a PTBNL (pitcher Darin Cloninger). Nettles, 39, has manned the Yankees' hot corner for 11 seasons, been selected to five AL All-Star teams and won two Gold Gloves, smashing 250 home runs in the process. He's played on four pennant winners and two World Series champions. Faced with diminished playing time, Nettles had sought a trade earlier in the spring and has fallen out of favor with owner George Steinbrenner and manager Yogi Berra.

=== April ===
- April 1:
  - The San Francisco Giants sign free-agent outfielder Dusty Baker.
  - The Seattle Mariners sign Venezuelan shortstop Omar Vizquel as an amateur free agent. He is 16 years old and 23 days from his 17th birthday. Once Vizquel begins his MLB career at 21 in April 1989, he'll play for 24 seasons and win 11 Gold Glove Awards.
- April 2 – The Texas Rangers release veteran shortstop Bucky Dent.
- April 3:
  - At the Metrodome, Jack Morris scatters five hits and strikes out eight, and Darrell Evans hits his first American League homer and knocks in three runs, as the Detroit Tigers breeze over the Minnesota Twins, 8–1, on Opening Day, 1984. The victory begins a 35–5 hot streak for the pennant-bound Tigers, who will be 8½ games in front in the AL East by May 24, when they finally cool off.
    - Pinch hitting for Dave Bergman in the seventh inning, the Tigers' Barbaro Garbey, 27, becomes the first refugee from Fidel Castro's powerful Cuban National Team to play in the major leagues. Garbey had fled Castro's regime to Florida aboard a fishing boat in May 1980 as part of the "freedom flotilla".
  - At Candlestick Park, the revamped Chicago Cubs begin their 114th season with a 5–3 victory over the San Francisco Giants, paced by Ron Cey and Keith Moreland home runs.
  - At Jack Murphy Stadium, Eric Show allows only three hits over seven innings and Kevin McReynolds and Carmelo Martínez hit homers, as the San Diego Padres, in only their 16th National League campaign, kick off 1984 with a 5–1 triumph over the visiting Pittsburgh Pirates.
  - The Pirates sign 27-year-old, four-year MLB veteran right-hander Bob Walk to a minor-league contract. Walk, released by the Atlanta Braves on March 26, will spend most of this season and 1985 back at Triple-A, but when he returns to Pittsburgh for good in August 1985, he'll become a valuable part of the Bucs' starting rotation and be selected to the 1988 NL All-Star team.
- April 7:
  - Jack Morris of the Detroit Tigers no-hits the Chicago White Sox 4–0 at Comiskey Park, in a game televised on NBC. The no-hitter is the first no-hitter by a Tiger since Jim Bunning in 1958 and also ties Ken Forsch's in 1979 as the earliest, calendar-wise, that a no-hitter is pitched.
  - In his MLB debut, the New York Mets' Dwight Gooden, 19, strikes out five in five innings to earn his first big-league win, 3–2 over the Houston Astros.

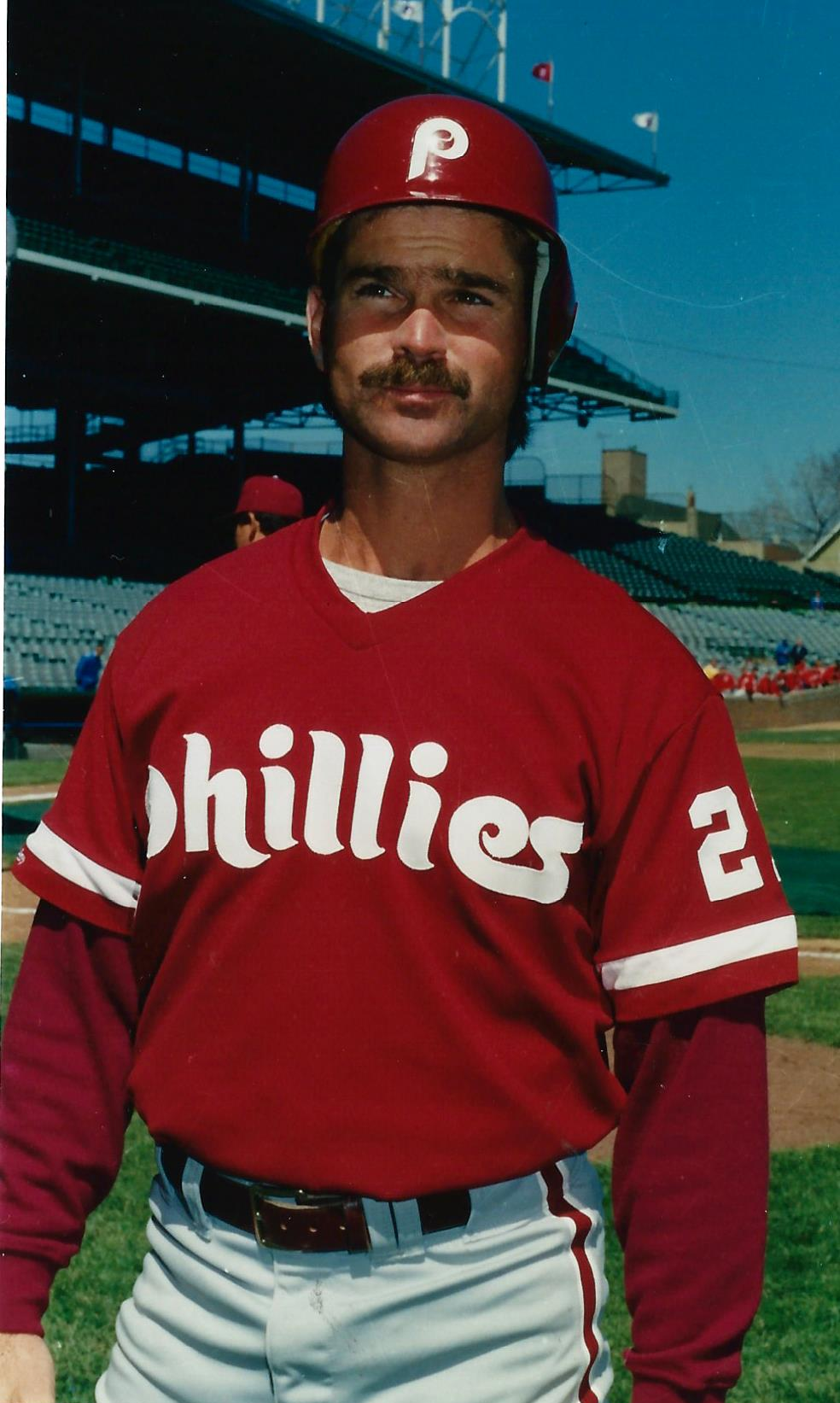
Dickie Thon during his 1989–1991 tenure with the Phillies

- April 8 – The day after Gooden's debut, the career of Houston's All-Star shortstop, Dickie Thon, suffers a massive setback when Thon is hit in the face by a Mike Torrez fastball, breaking the orbital bone around his left eye and permanently damaging his vision. Thon, 25, led the National League in bWAR (7.4) in 1983 and was viewed as a potential superstar. He misses the rest of 1984, but goes on to play nine more MLB seasons and 928 games with compromised eyesight.
- April 10:
  - The New York Yankees demote Murray Cook to director of scouting, and appoint Clyde King as Cook's successor as general manager. As a special advisor to owner George Steinbrenner since joining the Yankees in 1976, King, 59, has worn many hats, including field manager and pitching coach. Steinbrenner strongly hints that Cook is reassigned in response to the Yanks' embarrassing loss of pitching prospect Tim Belcher via the Type-A free agent compensation draft in February.
  - Ruppert Jones signs with the Detroit Tigers as a free agent. Jones played the previous season with the San Diego Padres, whom the Tigers will eventually face in the 1984 World Series.
- April 13 – Twenty-one years to the day that he connected for his first major league hit, Pete Rose of the Montreal Expos collects the 4,000th safety of his career; he is only the second player (after Ty Cobb) to ever accomplish this feat. Rose's first career hit in 1963 was a triple off Bob Friend of the Pittsburgh Pirates at long-demolished Crosley Field; today's is a double against his old team, the Philadelphia Phillies, struck off Jerry Koosman at Olympic Stadium.
- April 19 – Garth Iorg's ninth-inning triple drives home the winner in a 2–1 Toronto Blue Jays triumph over the visiting Baltimore Orioles. The defeat sends the defending World Series champion Orioles to the tenth defeat in their first 12 games of 1984, and they won't reach the .500 mark until May 6.
- April 21 – In a game shortened by rain, the Montreal Expos' David Palmer no-hits the St. Louis Cardinals, 4–0 at Busch Memorial Stadium. Palmer is perfect in his abbreviated, five-inning pitching gem.
- April 22 – For the second day in a row, the Philadelphia Phillies put up 12 runs against the visiting New York Mets, assuming first place in the National League East by a half-game over the fast-starting Mets.
- April 27 – In the visitors' 19th inning, two errors committed by Detroit Tigers' relief pitcher Glenn Abbott, followed by a Kirk Gibson error in right field, lead to four unearned runs and enable the Cleveland Indians to defeat Detroit, 8–4, at Tiger Stadium. The loss keeps the Tigers, now 16–2, from equaling the Oakland Athletics' record-setting 17–1 start to their 1981 season.
- April 29 – Jerry Koosman, 41, steps onto the mound at Shea Stadium for the first time in his career against the New York Mets, for whom he won 140 games between 1967 and 1978. The Mets beat Koosman and the Philadelphia Phillies, 6–2.

=== May ===
- May 2:
  - In a 16-inning, 9–7 victory over the Baltimore Orioles at Memorial Stadium, the Cleveland Indians' Andre Thornton ties an American League record for walks received in a game with six.
    - The game also features future Hall of Famer Jim Palmer making a rare relief appearance; hurling innings 14–16, Palmer walks five men and absorbs the loss. It's the next-to-last game he will pitch in pro ball.
  - LaMarr Hoyt falls just short of a perfect game, allowing only a seventh-inning single to Don Mattingly, and the Chicago White Sox down the New York Yankees 3–0 at Comiskey Park.
- May 4 – In the fourth inning tonight, Dave Kingman of the Oakland Athletics pops up a ball that never comes down. Playing the Minnesota Twins at the Metrodome, his pop fly goes through a drainage hole in the stadium roof. The umpires award Kingman a ground-rule double. Kingman doesn't score and the Twins win behind Frank Viola, 3–1.
- May 8 – Kirby Puckett, 24, makes his major league debut, going four for five as his Minnesota Twins shut out the California Angels, 5–0. Puckett will collect exactly 2,300 more hits before retiring prematurely in 1996 due to vision problems in his left eye. He will elected to the Baseball Hall of Fame in 2001.
- May 8–9 – Over two nights at Comiskey Park, the Chicago White Sox and Milwaukee Brewers engage in a 25-inning marathon that, at eight hours and six minutes, enters the record books as the longest MLB game, by time, in history. The game starts on May 8, and is suspended at 1:03 a.m. CDT after a 3–3 tie and 17 innings. When the contest is resumed on May 9, both teams manage to score three runs in the 21st to preserve the deadlock, now 6–6. Finally, with one out in the home 25th, Harold Baines slams a 420-foot (128m) home run over the center-field fence for a 7–6 Chicago triumph. Tom Seaver, pitching in relief for the first time since 1976, earns the victory and goes on to start, and win, the regularly scheduled, May 9 game that follows, for his second "W" of the day.
- May 10 – In "only" 16 innings, the New York Yankees tally twice in the home half of the 16th to come from behind and defeat the Cleveland Indians, 7–6. The Tribe had taken a one-run advantage in the visitors' half. Butch Wynegar drives in the winning run in support of 18-year-old José Rijo.
- May 11:
  - Dwight Gooden out-duels Fernando Valenzuela as the New York Mets defeat the Los Angeles Dodgers 2–0 at Dodger Stadium. Valenzuela strikes out eight in eight innings, while Gooden fans 11 in his first-ever MLB complete game.
  - In their second straight marathon contest, the New York Yankees fall to the visiting Seattle Mariners in 17 innings. Jack Perconte's sacrifice fly plates Darnell Coles with the winning run.
- May 12 – In defeating the St. Louis Cardinals 2–1 at Riverfront Stadium, Mario Soto of the Cincinnati Reds has a no-hitter broken up with two out in the ninth as George Hendrick's solo home run ties the game at 1–1. It is the only hit Soto allows. The Reds win the game for Soto in the bottom of the ninth, as Brad Gulden singles in Dave Concepción, the winning run.
- May 15:
  - Rookie Roger Clemens, recalled from Triple-A Pawtucket, makes his Boston Red Sox and MLB debut at Cleveland Stadium, going 52/3 innings, fanning four, and allowing five runs (four earned) on 11 hits and three bases on balls. The 21-year-old phenom leaves the contest trailing 5–4, but does not earn a decision in the BoSox' 7–5 defeat at the hands of the Indians.
  - Warning them against any "renewed involvement with drugs", Commissioner of Baseball Bowie Kuhn lifts the one-year suspensions of Willie Aikens (Toronto Blue Jays), Jerry Martin (New York Mets) and Willie Wilson (Kansas City Royals). The three had pled guilty last October to charges of attempting to purchase cocaine and served three-month prison sentences.
- May 16:
  - Mike Schmidt belts his 400th home run and Len Matuszek drives in four runs to lead the Philadelphia Phillies to a 12–1 win over the Los Angeles Dodgers. Schmidt becomes the 20th player to hit 400 home runs. Winning pitcher Jerry Koosman beats the Dodgers for the first time since 1975, when he was a New York Met.
  - Carlton Fisk of the Chicago White Sox hits for the cycle in a 7–6 loss to the Kansas City Royals.
- May 17 – Jim Palmer's 19-year, Hall-of-Fame career comes to an end when he is released by the Baltimore Orioles. Palmer, 38, retires with a career mark of 268–152 (2.86), three AL Cy Young Awards (1973, 1975, 1976), six All-Star selections, and three World Series titles. He's elected to Cooperstown on his first year of eligibility in 1990.

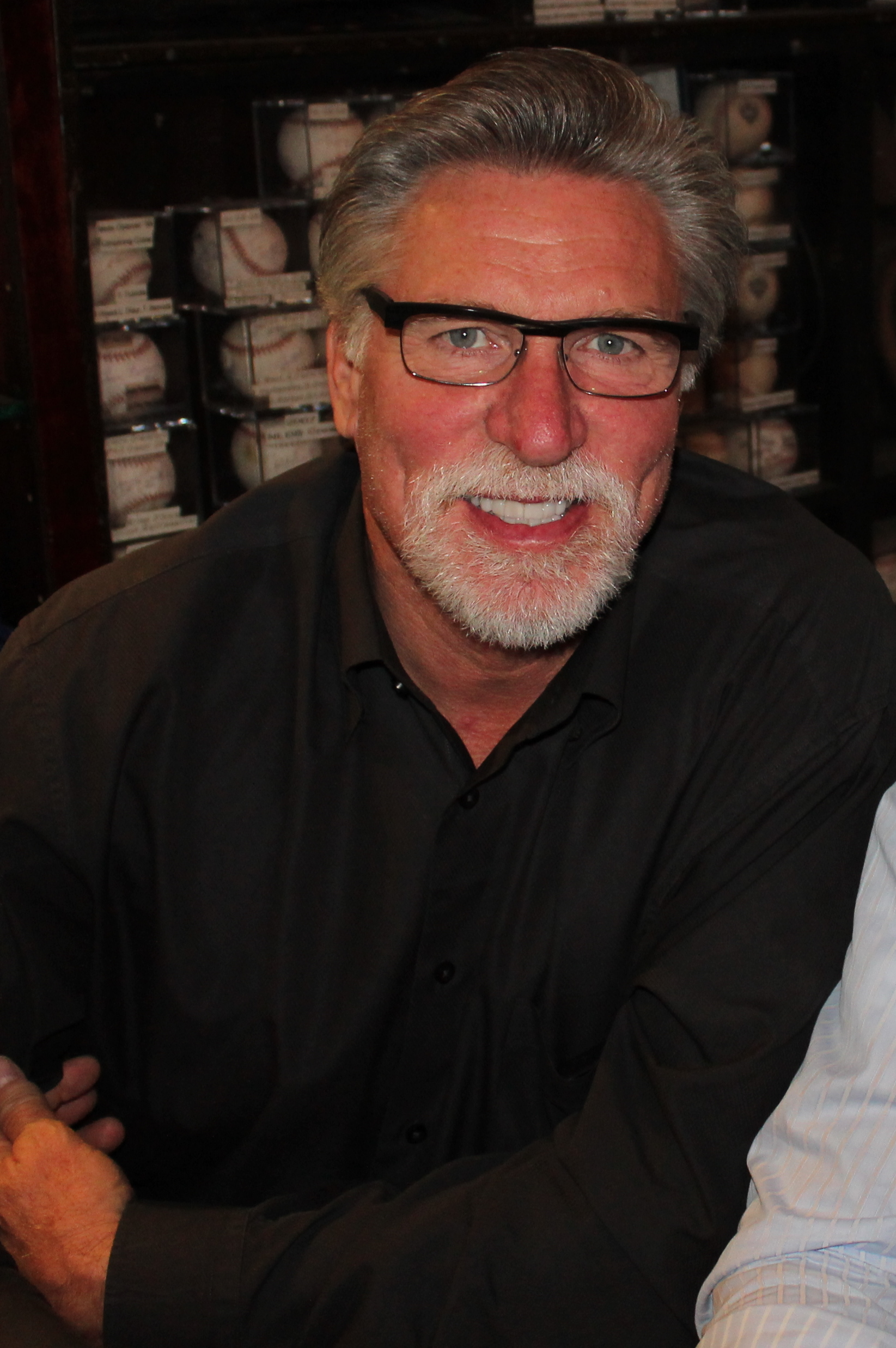
Jack Morris (2013)

- May 24:
  - The Detroit Tigers' Jack Morris pitches a four hit complete game victory against the California Angels to improve his record to 9–1, and the team's record to 35–5, the best 40-game start in major league history.
  - The Oakland Athletics sack second-year manager Steve Boros and replace him with first-base coach Jackie Moore. Oakland is 20–24, yet only 2½ games out of first in the AL West.
- May 25 – The Boston Red Sox obtain first baseman/outfielder Bill Buckner from the Chicago Cubs for pitcher Dennis Eckersley and minor-league infielder Mike Brumley. Buckner, 34, is hitting only .201 and has lost his regular job to Leon Durham; Eckersley, 29, is 4–4 but sports an ugly 5.01 earned run average in nine starting assignments for the Bosox.
- May 27 – A half-hour-long argument-turned-brawl punctuates Eckersley's first NL start. In the second inning at Wrigley Field, with two men on base, the Cubs' Ron Cey hits a long foul ball down the left field line off Mario Soto of the Cincinnati Reds that third-base umpire Steve Rippley incorrectly rules a home run. The Reds protest vociferously, and Soto makes contact with Rippley during the dispute. After conferring, the four-man umpiring crew overrules the home-run call and takes the Cubs' three runs off the board. Chicago manager Jim Frey and coach Don Zimmer then swarm the umpires, furious at the reversal. Their long argument fails to restore the homer, and Frey is thrown out of the game. But when Soto learns belatedly that he's also been ejected for bumping Rippley, he charges onto the field to confront the umpires. His catcher, Brad Gulden, and Zimmer try to intercept Soto to prevent a violent incident—and Zimmer gets knocked to the ground, triggering a full-scale melee involving both benches and bullpens. The brawl threatens to spread to the stands, after a vendor douses Soto with a bag of ice as he's exiting the field; the angry pitcher wields a bat in response. Both teams play the game under protest. As a footnote, the protests are denied, the Reds win the game 4–3, and four days later, National League president Chub Feeney suspends Soto for five games.

=== June ===
- June 4:
  - In the 1984 Major League Baseball draft, the Chicago Cubs select 18-year-old right-hander Greg Maddux of Valley High School of Las Vegas in the second round, 31st overall. He'll go on to a Hall-of-Fame career, winning 355 games, four Cy Young Awards, four ERA titles, and 18 Gold Glove Awards.
  - Sixteen picks after Maddux, the Atlanta Braves draft southpaw Tom Glavine, 18, of Billerica Memorial High School in Massachusetts with the 47th overall selection. Glavine is also bound for Cooperstown, teaming with Maddux and John Smoltz to form a trio of Hall-of-Fame starting pitchers that powers the Braves to three National League pennants between 1993 and 1999. Over his 22-year career, Glavine will win 305 games, two Cy Young Awards, and both a 1995 World Series ring and World Series MVP Award. Coincidentally, Maddux (#31) and Glavine (#47) will wear uniform numbers that reflect their draft position, and those numbers will be retired by the Braves in their honor.
- June 5 – The "Coup LeRoux," a year-long ownership battle for control of the Boston Red Sox, nears its end with a Massachusetts Superior Court ruling against general partner Buddy LeRoux' takeover attempt. LeRoux is immediately ousted from his senior post in the Red Sox' front office, and his foe Haywood Sullivan is promoted to both CEO and chief operating officer. Lou Gorman, former Seattle Mariners and New York Mets senior baseball operations executive, takes Sullivan's place as general manager. The "coup de grâce" that forever ends LeRoux' gambit will occur later this month when his appeal is rejected.
- June 7 – Bucky Dent returns to the New York Yankees' organization as a free agent but doesn't appear in a varsity uniform. He spends a little over a month at Triple-A Columbus before moving on to the Kansas City Royals, where he'll finish his MLB career.
- June 9 – A 12–2 victory over the Cincinnati Reds coupled with an Atlanta Braves loss boost the San Diego Padres, now 33–23, into first place in the National League West since May 28. The Padres will not relinquish their division lead for the remainder of the season.

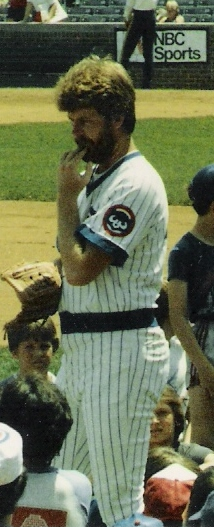
Rick Sutcliffe in 1985

- June 13 – In one of the most significant and successful trades in their history, the Chicago Cubs obtain starting pitcher Rick Sutcliffe, along with relief pitcher George Frazier and catcher Ron Hassey, from the Cleveland Indians in exchange for outfielders Joe Carter and Mel Hall and young pitchers Don Schulze and Darryl Banks. Sutcliffe, 28, becomes the ace of the Cubs' staff; making 20 starts, he wins 16 of 17 regular-season decisions, including the division-clinching game September 24, posts a 2.69 ERA, and is the unanimous choice as winner of 1984's NL Cy Young Award.
- June 14 – Len Barker of the Atlanta Braves one-hits the visiting Cincinnati Reds over seven innings, and Donnie Moore's hitless relief earns him the save in a 3–0 Atlanta victory. Eddie Milner's fourth-inning single is Cincinnati's only "knock." Barker had authored a perfect game on May 15, 1981, while he was a member of the Cleveland Indians.
- June 15:
  - The Braves acquire third baseman Ken Oberkfell from the St. Louis Cardinals for left-hander Ken Dayley and first baseman Mike Jorgensen.
  - The Cincinnati Reds deal pitcher Bruce Berenyi to the New York Mets for pitchers Jay Tibbs and Matt Bollinger and third baseman Eddie Williams.
- June 16 – Mario Soto, the Reds' #1 starting pitcher and a soon-to-be 1984 NL All-Star, again faces disciplinary action after another bench-clearing brawl. At Fulton County Stadium, the Braves' Claudell Washington homers off Soto in the first inning, giving Atlanta a 1–0 lead. When Washington bats again in the third, Soto knocks him down with a brushback pitch. In the fifth, his third plate appearance, Washington swings at Soto's first offering and flings his bat towards the pitchers' mound; then, while ostensibly retrieving it, he confronts Soto and the benches clear. Cincinnati catcher Dann Bilardello and home-plate umpire Lanny Harris try to separate the combatants, and Washington knocks Harris to the ground. After punching at Washington with the baseball in his hand, Soto fires the ball into the scrum of fighting players, striking Braves coach Joe Pignatano in the leg. Soto is suspended for five games and fined $5,000 by NL president Chub Feeney, while Washington receives a three-game ban; the Reds appeal on Soto's behalf. Cincinnati comes back to win the contest, 2–1.
- June 19 – In his first start as a Chicago Cub, Rick Sutcliffe pitches into the ninth inning against the Pittsburgh Pirates at Three Rivers Stadium without allowing a run. Sutcliffe is lifted after giving up one earned run and is charged with two more unearned runs after Lee Smith replaces him on the mound. Even so, the Cubs, and Sutcliffe, hold on for the 4–3 victory.
- June 22 – Ending his family's 65 years of owning and operating the franchise this is now the Minnesota Twins, Calvin Griffith sells its 52% share to Minneapolis executive Carl Pohlad for an estimated $32 million. Pohlad also acquires former minority owner H. Gabriel Murphy's 42% share from the Tampa Bay Baseball Group for $11.5 million. Griffith and his sister Thelma inherited the Washington Senators from uncle and Hall of Fame pitcher Clark Griffith in October 1955, and moved them to Minneapolis–Saint Paul five years later. Griffith formally steps down as team president when the Pohlad sale closes September 7; veteran team executive Howard Fox succeeds him.
- June 23 – On a broadcast of NBC's Game of the Week at Wrigley Field, the third-place Chicago Cubs and fifth-place St. Louis Cardinals lock up in a tight game. In the bottom of the ninth inning, trailing 9–8, Cubs second baseman Ryne Sandberg hits a game-tying solo home run off reliever Bruce Sutter. The Cardinals regain the lead in the tenth, 11–9, but Sandberg belts another homer off Sutter in the bottom of the frame, this time with a runner on base to tie the game at 11, then Chicago proceeds to win by a run in the home half of the 12th. When Sandberg eventually captures the 1984 NL MVP Award and the NL East-champion Cubs reach the postseason for the first time since 1945, today's game is cited as key to both milestones. St. Louis' Willie McGee hits for the cycle in a losing cause. Both Sandberg (2005) and Sutter (2006) will eventually be elected to the Hall of Fame.
- June 26 – Jason Thompson of the Pittsburgh Pirates ties Ralph Kiner's 37-year franchise record by hitting four home runs in a doubleheader against the Chicago Cubs at Wrigley Field. He hits two home runs in both games, the Pirates winning the first game 9–0, and the Cubs the nightcap 9–8.
- June 30 – The Philadelphia Phillies trade pitcher Marty Bystrom and outfielder Keith Hughes to the New York Yankees for left-hander Shane Rawley.

=== July ===
- July 4:
  - Hurling eight shutout innings today in a 5–0 blanking of the Texas Rangers, Phil Niekro of the New York Yankees records his 3,000th career strikeout, the second to do so on the Fourth of July, after Nolan Ryan in 1980. The 45-year-old knuckleballer is off to a strong beginning in the American League—an 11–4 (1.84) record in 18 starts—and is en route to his selection to the Junior Circuit's All-Star team.
  - At the traditional half-way mark of the regular season, there are three tightly contested divisional races. In the NL East, the re-tooled Chicago Cubs (45–35) lead the surprising New York Mets (42–34) by one game and the Philadelphia Phillies (43–37) by two. In the NL West, the San Diego Padres (46–33) hold a four-game edge on the Atlanta Braves (44–39). In the AL West, the California Angels (43–39) are up by two games on the Chicago White Sox and the rebuilding Minnesota Twins, both 40–40. The AL East, led since Opening Day by the Detroit Tigers, sees the Tigers (55–25) ahead of a rising divisional power, the Toronto Blue Jays (48–32), by seven lengths.
- July 10 – At Candlestick Park, on the 50th anniversary of Carl Hubbell's legendary five consecutive strikeouts in the 1934 All-Star Game, National League pitchers Fernando Valenzuela and Dwight Gooden combine to fan six batters in a row, setting a new record in the NL's 3–1 triumph over the American League. After Valenzuela whiffs Dave Winfield, Reggie Jackson and George Brett in the fourth inning, Gooden, the youngest All-Star ever at age 19, fans Lance Parrish, Chet Lemon and Alvin Davis in the fifth. Gary Carter, whose second-inning solo homer provides the game-winning RBI, is named the Midsummer Classic's MVP for a second time.
- July 13:
  - Future Hall of Famer Bert Blyleven one-hits the Texas Rangers at Arlington Stadium, allowing only Larry Parrish's fourth-inning single, although walking five. Blyleven's Cleveland Indians win, 5–0.
  - The San Francisco Giants and Pittsburgh Pirates go 18 innings and five hours, 11 minutes, at Three Rivers Stadium to settle the nightcap of a Friday evening doubleheader. Jason Thompson's single plates Lee Mazzilli with the winning run in a 4–3 Pittsburgh triumph.
- July 15 – Alan Ashby's 16th-inning single delivers José Cruz with the winning run, as the Houston Astros defeat the Philadelphia Phillies, 3–2, in an Astrodome marathon.
- July 21 – The New York Yankees retire Roger Maris' #9 and Elston Howard's #32 and install plaques in their honor at Yankee Stadium. Howard, the first Black member of the Bombers, the 1963 AL MVP, and a 12-time All-Star, is commemorated posthumously; he died in 1980 at age 51. Maris, who broke Babe Ruth's single-season home-run mark in 1961, was a two-time MVP and 6x All-Star during his seven-year Yankee career; now 49, he is battling non-Hodgkin lymphoma.
- July 26:
  - Pete Rose of the Montreal Expos ties Ty Cobb on the career singles list at 3,052, with a base hit in the eighth inning in a 5–4 victory over the Pittsburgh Pirates at Olympic Stadium.
  - The Expos obtain veteran first baseman Dan Driessen from the Cincinnati Reds for pitchers Andy McGaffigan and Jim Jefferson.

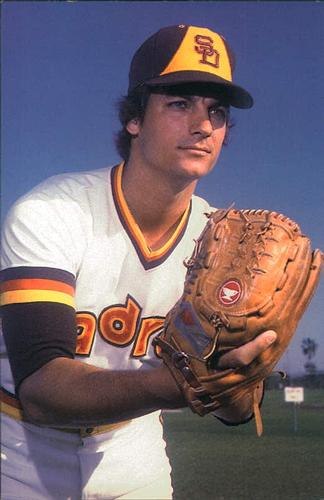
Dave Dravecky

- July 30 – San Diego Padres' southpaw Dave Dravecky one-hits the Los Angeles Dodgers in a complete-game, 12–0 shutout win at Jack Murphy Stadium. Bill Russell's seventh-inning double is Los Angeles' only safety. Kevin McReynolds' first-inning, three-run homer puts the game out of reach early. The Padres increase their NL West lead to 8½ games.

=== August ===
- August 1 – A 5–4 victory over the Philadelphia Phillies and a Mets loss to the St. Louis Cardinals pull the Chicago Cubs into first place in the National League East for the first time since July 6. They will remain atop their division for the remainder of the season.
- August 2 – Rick Cerone's bloop single drives in the tie-breaking run in the eighth inning as the New York Yankees beat the Milwaukee Brewers 6–4 and reach the .500 mark for the first time since April 20.
- August 3 – Nolan Ryan scatters seven hits and Jerry Mumphrey homers and singles and drives in four runs as the Houston Astros beat the San Diego Padres, 6–2. Ryan is now 9-7 for the season.
- August 4 – Burdened with the worst record in MLB (42–64, .396), the San Francisco Giants fire manager Frank Robinson. He has compiled a 264–277 (.488) record since 1981, with only one over-.500 season. Former Philadelphia Phillies pilot Danny Ozark, the Giants' third-base coach, is named interim manager for the remainder of 1984.
- August 5 – Starter Ray Fontenot and two relievers, including Phil Niekro, hold the Cleveland Indians to one hit, as the New York Yankees blank the Cleveland Indians, 4–0. Brook Jacoby's sixth-inning single off Fontenot spoils the no-no.
- August 9 – Tom Seaver only lasts 32/3 innings and gives up six earned runs in his first career start against the New York Yankees. Seaver is charged with the White Sox' 7–6 loss.
- August 12 – Atlanta-Fulton County Stadium witnesses a series of beanings, attempted beanings, and two bench clearing fist fights, the second of which sees fans spill out onto the field. Five Atlanta Braves and 12 San Diego Padres are ejected; five fans are arrested. The 17 ejections in one game set an MLB record. Dick Williams, manager of the Padres, is fined $10,000 and suspended ten days, while Braves manager Joe Torre is suspended for three games.
- August 13:
  - Mike Boddicker of the Baltimore Orioles tosses a one-hitter (a lead-off double to Rance Mulliniks in the third inning) to defeat the Toronto Blue Jays 2–1 at Exhibition Stadium.
  - The New York Yankees acquire pitching prospect Doug Drabek, 21, from the Chicago White Sox as one of two players to be named later (left-hander Kevin Hickey is the other) to complete a July 18 trade in which the ChiSox obtained shortstop Roy Smalley III. Drabek will win a Cy Young Award in 1990 as a member of the Pittsburgh Pirates.
- August 16–17:
  - The Cincinnati Reds, 51–70 (.422) and 20½ games out of first place in the NL West, awaken a discouraged fanbase, announcing that they've reacquired Pete Rose, the Reds' greatest all-time player (78.1 bWAR), and named the 43-year-old the club's player–manager. Rose returns to his native city after a 5½-year absence, during which he helped the Philadelphia Phillies win two pennants and the first World Series in their history. Rose is acquired on an off-day, August 16, from the Montreal Expos, where he's hit .259 in 95 games played, for infielder Tom Lawless. He replaces first-year skipper Vern Rapp at the Cincinnati helm.
  - On Friday, August 17, Rose debuts as the Reds' playing manager with 35,038 in the stands at Riverfront Stadium. Playing first base and batting second, he singles and doubles in four at bats, drives in two runs, brings the crowd to its feet with a trademarked head-first slide into third base in the first inning, and helps Cincinnati defeat the Chicago Cubs, 6–4. The two safeties leave Rose only 127 hits behind Ty Cobb's all-time record.
- August 20 – The Philadelphia Phillies, six games out of the NL East lead, obtain first baseman and former NL batting champ Al Oliver, 37, and pitcher Renie Martin (a PTBNL added to the trade August 30) from the San Francisco Giants for pitchers Kelly Downs and George Riley. Oliver hits .312 in 29 games but fails to turn around the Phils' fortunes.
- August 24 – Rick Sutcliffe, now 12–1 (2.97), allows five hits in winning his tenth consecutive game and Ryne Sandberg drives in two runs as the division-leading Chicago Cubs beat the Atlanta Braves, 3–0.
- August 26 – One batter after Frank White, the potential winning run, is picked off second base in the home half of the 16th inning, Greg Pryor saves the day for the Kansas City Royals with a walk-off home run off Bert Roberge, enabling Kansas City to defeat the Chicago White Sox, 6–5.
- August 28 – The New York Mets acquire veteran third baseman Ray Knight from the Houston Astros for three young prospects, all players to be named later: pitcher Mitch Cook (21), infielder Manuel Lee (19) and outfielder Gerald Young (19). Knight, 31, is a two-time NL All-Star whose impact in New York will be most keenly felt in two years, when he's the voted Most Valuable Player of the 1986 World Series and earns a championship ring.
- August 29 – At Shea Stadium, Keith Hernandez hits a walk-off double to complete the Mets' three-game sweep of the Los Angeles Dodgers. But Hernandez' team fails to gain any ground on the Cubs, who are in the midst of a five-game win streak.
- August 30 – Days after he's told his Montreal Expos bosses that he plans to step down at the close of the season, manager Bill Virdon is dismissed. His predecessor, Jim Fanning, moves back from the front office into the Montreal dugout as interim manager. The Expos, NL East contenders since 1979, are a disappointing 65–67 and 14½ games behind.
- August 31 – Completing a transaction begun July 15, when they sent right-hander Chuck Rainey to the Oakland Athletics for a PTBNL, the Chicago Cubs receive veteran Davey Lopes, former 4x NL All-Star second baseman, for the stretch drive. Lopes, 39, will appear 16 times for the Cubs in pinch-hitting and utility roles during September.

=== September ===
- September 1:
  - Buzzie Bavasi, general manager of the California Angels, announces his retirement, effective at the end of the season; he'll be succeeded by a senior aide, Mike Port. Bavasi, 69, has spent 34 consecutive years as a high-level MLB team executive, previously serving as GM of the Brooklyn/Los Angeles Dodgers (1950–1968) and president/minority owner of the San Diego Padres (1968–1977), before he joined the Angels in 1977.
  - The Seattle Mariners, 59–76 and 10½ games out of first in the AL West's pennant scramble, fire manager Del Crandall and name coach Chuck Cottier interim skipper. Crandall has led Seattle to a 93–131 (.415) record over parts of two seasons. Cottier's "interim" tag will be removed in November when he's named the Mariners' 1985 manager.
  - The Texas Rangers become the third AL West franchise to make a management change today, firing general manager Joe Klein and replacing him with former outfielder Tom Grieve, 36, who appeared in 607 games for the franchise between 1970 and 1977. Klein has held the GM post for less than two full years.
- September 3 – The conclusion of Labor Day action sees only one tight race among the four divisions: the surprising Minnesota Twins (70–67) lead the Kansas City Royals by two and the California Angels by 2½ games in the AL West. The Twins, who had finished 70–92 in 1983, are the only above-.500 team in their division. The Chicago Cubs (six games), Detroit Tigers (8½) and San Diego Padres (ten) have built more comfortable margins over their pursuers.
- September 5 – Murray Cook, 43, demoted in April as general manager of the New York Yankees, joins the Montreal Expos as vice president/GM. He succeeds John McHale as the 16-year-old NL East franchise's top baseball operations executive; McHale, 62, who owns ten percent of the Expos, remains as president and CEO. Born in Sackville, New Brunswick, Cook is the first Canadian to serve as the Expos' general manager.
- September 6 – Third baseman Randy Johnson's lead-off home run in the visitors' half of the 18th inning breaks a 2–2 deadlock, and Pete Falcone shuts down the Los Angeles Dodgers in the bottom of the frame, to give the Atlanta Braves a 3–2 victory in one of the longest games of 1984.
- September 7 – In the opener of a crucial three-game series at Shea Stadium, Dwight Gooden strikes out 11 Chicago Cubs batters and allows only one hit (a lead-off single by Keith Moreland in the fifth inning) in the New York Mets' 10–0 victory. The Mets will take two of the three contests—but still trail Chicago by six games.
- September 14:
  - Seattle Mariners rookie Mark Langston pitches a 2–1, five-hit victory against the Kansas City Royals, to becomes the first pitcher in Mariners' history to win 15 games in a regular season.
  - In the first matchup of their three-game return engagement, this time at Wrigley Field, Rick Sutcliffe improves to 15–1 and bests Ron Darling (12–7), as the Cubs handle the visiting Mets 7–1. Jody Davis' sixth-inning grand slam off reliever Brent Gaff puts the contest, and essentially the NL East flag, out of reach; when the series concludes Sunday, the New Yorkers trail by 8½ with only 12 games to play.
- September 15 – San Diego Padres outfielder Tony Gwynn collects his 200th hit of the season in a 3–2 loss to the Houston Astros.
- September 17:
  - Reggie Jackson becomes the 13th player in Major League Baseball history to record 500 home runs. Jackson achieves his feat against Kansas City Royals pitcher Bud Black, and his 500th blast comes exactly 17 years after his first career home run, which came as a member of the old Kansas City Athletics.
  - Rookie pitcher Dwight Gooden of the New York Mets strikes out 16 Philadelphia Phillies in a 2–1 loss at Philadelphia. After fanning 16 Pittsburgh Pirates five days earlier, Gooden ties a major league record with 32 strikeouts in two consecutive games.

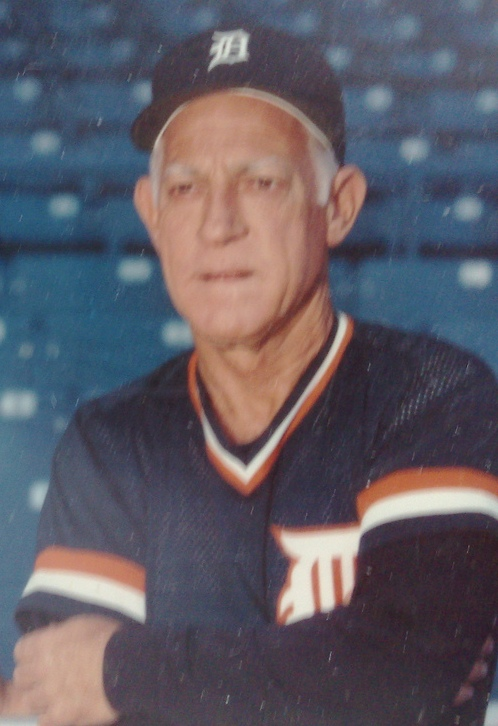
Sparky Anderson

- September 18 – The Detroit Tigers clinch the American League Eastern Division, becoming the fourth team in history to hold first place from day one of the season (joining the 1923 New York Giants, the 1927 New York Yankees, and 1955 Brooklyn Dodgers).
- September 19 – Pete Rose collects his 100th hit of the campaign, becoming the first player in Major League history to collect that many hits in 22 consecutive seasons. It happens to be his 725th career double, which establishes a new National League record.
- September 20 – The San Diego Padres capture the first National League Western Division title in their 16-year history as pitcher Tim Lollar's three-run homer keys a 5–4 win over the San Francisco Giants at Jack Murphy Stadium. Only 15,766 witness the landmark game.
- September 23 – A 4–1 win over the New York Yankees is the Detroit Tigers' 100th win of 1984, and gives Tigers' manager Sparky Anderson the honor of being the first manager in history to guide teams to 100-win seasons in both leagues.
- September 24 – The Chicago Cubs end a 39-year postseason drought when Rick Sutcliffe fires a 4–1, two-hit complete game victory over the Pittsburgh Pirates in Three Rivers Stadium to clinch the National League Eastern Division title. The victory comes on the 15th anniversary of the Cubs' elimination from the 1969 pennant chase.
- September 25 – At Shea Stadium, 40-year-old Rusty Staub of the New York Mets hits a walk-off home run off Larry Andersen to defeat the Philadelphia Phillies 6–4. Staub, who had hit six home runs as a 19-year-old with the Houston Colt .45s in 1963, becomes the second player, after Ty Cobb, to hit home runs before his 20th birthday and after his 40th birthday.
- September 26:
  - Ralph Houk closes the book on his two-decade-long MLB managerial career, announcing his retirement from the Boston Red Sox effective October 1. Houk, 65, will retire with a 1,619–1,531–7 (.514) record at the helm of the New York Yankees (1961–1963, 1966–1973), Detroit Tigers (1974–1978) and Red Sox (1981–1984). He won three AL pennants and the 1961 and 1962 World Series during his first three seasons as Casey Stengel's successor in the Bronx.
  - In an unusual sequence of events, the Milwaukee Brewers fire first-year manager Rene Lachemann and bring back 1978–1980 skipper George Bamberger to replace him starting in 1985—but allow Lachemann to manage the 65–93 Brewers for their final three games of 1984. In between his Brewers' assignments, Bamberger, 61, had managed the New York Mets from 1982 through June 2, 1983.
- September 28:
  - The ding-dong American League Western Division race is decided when the Kansas City Royals (84–76) defeat the Oakland Athletics 6–5, and the second-place Minnesota Twins (81–79) fall to the Cleveland Indians 11–10. The Royals are crowned division champs for the fifth time in nine years.
  - In addition to saving 29 games this season, Twins closer Ron Davis blows his 14th save today to tie a season record, set in 1976 by future Hall of Famer Rollie Fingers and subsequently tied by Bruce Sutter, also a Hall of Famer, (1978) and Bob Stanley (1983).
- September 30:
  - Mike Witt of the California Angels holds on for a 1–0 win over the Texas Rangers, the 11th perfect game since 1901.
  - In the New York Yankees' final game of the season, the American League batting race is decided when Don Mattingly goes 4 for 5 to raise his average to .343, while teammate Dave Winfield finishes with a .340 average. The two teammates battle for the league lead in batting average for most of the year.
  - The 1983 National League champion Philadelphia Phillies, whose 9–20 September record capped a disappointing second half of 1984, announce that Paul Owens is yielding both his on-field and front-office leadership positions. Owens, 60, steps aside as the Phils' field manager in favor of coach John Felske, 42, a former backup catcher. Owens has managed the Phils to a 128–111 (.536) regular-season mark and an NL pennant since July 18, 1983. Moreover, Owens will no longer serve as general manager, instead becoming a special assistant to president Bill Giles, who will take on Owens' former GM duties. Owens has been the Phillies' top baseball officer since June 1972, and under him the team has reached the postseason six times in 13 seasons, winning two NL pennants and, in 1980, the first World Series title in franchise history.

=== October ===
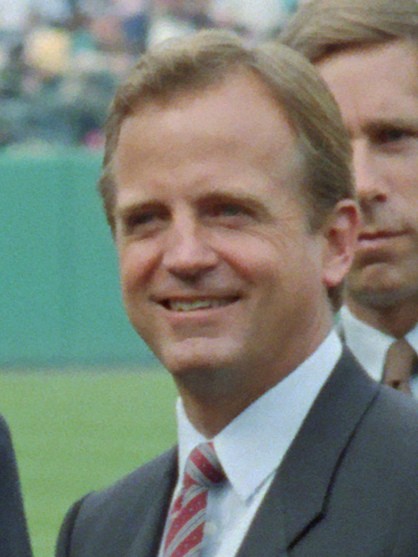
Peter Ueberroth

- October 1 – Seven weeks after the successful conclusion of the 1984 Los Angeles Olympics, Peter Ueberroth takes office as Commissioner of Baseball; he succeeds Bowie Kuhn.
- October 2 – After three seasons, one NL West championship, and a 257–229 (.529) record, Joe Torre is fired as manager of the Atlanta Braves. Eddie Haas, promoted to the Braves' coaching staff in August after a successful 3½-year tenure piloting Triple-A Richmond, is named his successor. Torre—previously fired by the New York Mets in October 1981—will take a break from managing and become an analyst on the California Angels' television crew beginning in 1985.
- October 3 – Johnny Grubb delivers a two-run double in the eleventh inning to lift the Detroit Tigers to a 5–3 victory over the Kansas City Royals in Game 2 of the 1984 American League Championship Series.
- October 5 – The Tigers' Milt Wilcox and the Royals' Charlie Leibrandt engage in a pitchers' duel in the third game of the 1984 ALCS. A Marty Castillo ground out in the second inning that scores Chet Lemon is the deciding factor, as the Tigers win 1–0 to sweep the Royals in three straight games.
- October 6 – The San Diego Padres' Steve Garvey hits a walk off, two-run home run off the Chicago Cubs' Lee Smith in Game 4 of the 1984 National League Championship Series to even it at two games apiece. For the evening, Garvey has five RBIs in San Diego's 7–5 victory.
- October 7 – A crucial error by Chicago Cubs first baseman Leon Durham leads to a four-run seventh inning for the San Diego Padres, who beat the Cubs, 6–3, in the deciding Game 5 of the 1984 NLCS. Steve Garvey, who bats .400 with a home run and seven RBIs, is named series MVP.
- October 14 – Kirk Gibson blasts two upper-deck home runs at Tiger Stadium in Game 5 of the 1984 World Series, to lead the Detroit Tigers to an 8–4 victory over the San Diego Padres and their first world championship since 1968. Alan Trammell (nine hits, 1.300 OPS) is selected the Series MVP.
- October 17:
  - Jim Frey of the Chicago Cubs, who led his team to its first NL East title and its first postseason berth in 39 years, is named National League Manager of the Year by the BBWAA.
  - The California Angels announce that, after a two-year hiatus, Gene Mauch will return to his former job as field manager. Mauch, 58, had retired from the post in the aftermath of the decisive Game 5 of the 1982 American League Championship Series; he's served the Angels as director of player personnel since 1983. Mauch's re-appointment frees John McNamara, who has managed the Halos for the past two seasons, to join the Boston Red Sox as successor to their retired skipper, Ralph Houk. Mauch and McNamara will manage against each other in the 1986 ALCS.
- October 20 – The Cincinnati Reds hire longtime executive Bill Bergesch as general manager. Bergesch, 63, had been a member of George Steinbrenner's New York Yankees front office since 1977, and served a brief term (1982–1983) as the Bombers' GM.
- October 23 – Although he spent the first two months of 1984 in the Junior Circuit, Rick Sutcliffe, who pitched the Chicago Cubs to the NL East championship by winning 16 of 17 decisions in 20 starts after his acquisition June 13, cruises to the NL Cy Young Award, taking all 24 first-place votes.
- October 30 – Former stalwart third baseman Jim Davenport, who on April 15, 1958 became the first man to officially bat for the relocated San Francisco Giants, is named the club's manager for 1985. Davenport, 51, is in the midst of a 60+ year pro baseball career that will include 51 years in the Giants' organization as a player, coach, MLB and minor-league manager, scout, and front office official. He succeeds interim pilot Danny Ozark.

=== November ===
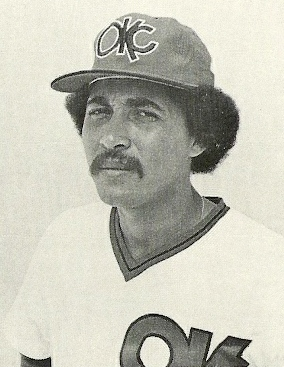
Willie Hernández at age 21 (1976)

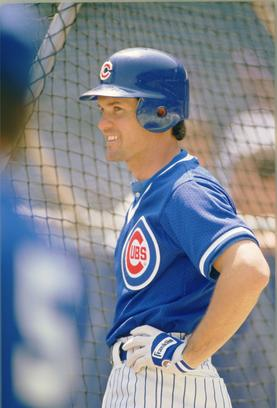
Ryne Sandberg

- November 6:
  - Willie Hernández of the World Series champion Detroit Tigers wins the American League MVP Award, joining Rollie Fingers as the only relief pitchers in Major League Baseball history to be named MVP and Cy Young Award winners in the same season. Hernández wins the MVP with 16 of 28 first-place votes and 306 points, outdistancing Kent Hrbek (247 points). He had captured the AL's "CYA" October 30, taking 63% of the vote (88 points) to fellow reliever Dan Quisenberry's 51% (71), after leading his league in games pitched (80) and notching 32 saves to accompany his nine regular-season victories. Hernández later added two saves in the 1984 World Series.
  - Boston Red Sox slugger Tony Armas finishes seventh, despite winning the home run (43) and RBI (123) titles. The last player to lead in those categories and not win is Ted Williams, twice, in the 1942 and 1947 seasons.
- November 8 – The ranks of players granted free agency swells by 54 names today—and some of them are the biggest in baseball: future Hall of Famers Dennis Eckersley, Rollie Fingers, Tony Pérez and Bruce Sutter; the NL's Cy Young Award-winner, Rick Sutcliffe; and still-elite players like Dave Kingman, Fred Lynn, Rick Reuschel and André Thornton. In all 99 players will be granted free agency under the terms of the CBA between owners and the MLBPA from October 10 to December 23, 1984.
- November 13 – Ryne Sandberg, whose efforts afield and at bat helped the Chicago Cubs make post-season play for the first time in 39 years as NL East champs, is named the National League's MVP, capturing 22 of 24 first-place votes. Tony Gwynn of the actual 1984 NL pennant-winners, the San Diego Padres, gets one first-place vote and finishes third.
- November 14:
  - The Montreal Expos sign outfielder Larry Walker, 17, from Maple Ridge, British Columbia, a non-draft-eligible free agent who has been playing amateur baseball in his native province. A future five-tool talent who will win three batting titles, the 1997 NL MVP Award, and seven Gold Gloves, Walker will become perhaps the greatest Canadian position player in MLB annals by the end of his career in 2005 as a member of the Expos, Colorado Rockies and St. Louis Cardinals. The five-time All-Star will be elected to the Baseball Hall of Fame in 2020.
  - The Expos fill their 1985 managerial vacancy, promoting Buck Rodgers from Triple-A Indianapolis. Rodgers, 46, previously piloted the Milwaukee Brewers to a 124–102 (.549) mark between 1980 and 1982.
- November 20 – Four days after his 20th birthday, New York Mets pitcher Dwight Gooden becomes the youngest player ever to win the National League Rookie of the Year Award. Gooden posted a 17–9 (2.60) record, with a major league-leading 276 strikeouts. He captures 23 of 24 first-place votes.
- November 22 – With 25 first-place votes, Seattle Mariners first baseman Alvin Davis (.284, 27 homers, 116 RBI) easily wins the AL Rookie of the Year Award over his teammate, pitcher Mark Langston (three votes). Minnesota Twins outfielder Kirby Puckett finishes a distant third.
- November 27 – The American League Gold Glove team is announced, and is made up of the same nine players as the 1983 team: Ron Guidry (P), Lance Parrish (C), Eddie Murray (1B), Lou Whitaker (2B), Buddy Bell (3B), Alan Trammell (SS), Dwight Evans (OF), Dave Winfield (OF) and Dwayne Murphy (OF).
- November 28 – Free-agent right-hander Dennis Eckersley, on the open market for 20 days, signs a three-year, $7.5 million contract to return to the Chicago Cubs for 1985. Acquired May 25, Eckersley posted a 10–8 (3.03) record in 24 starts, helping the Cubs to the division title.
- November 29 – Former San Diego Padres general manager and Toronto Blue Jays president Peter Bavasi is named to succeed Gabe Paul as president and chief operating officer of the Cleveland Indians. Paul, 74, retires after a six-decade baseball career and 40 years as a high-level MLB executive. Bavasi, 42, will continue his family's connection with senior baseball management; his father recently retired from a 34-year MLB career that almost paralleled Gabe Paul's.

=== December ===
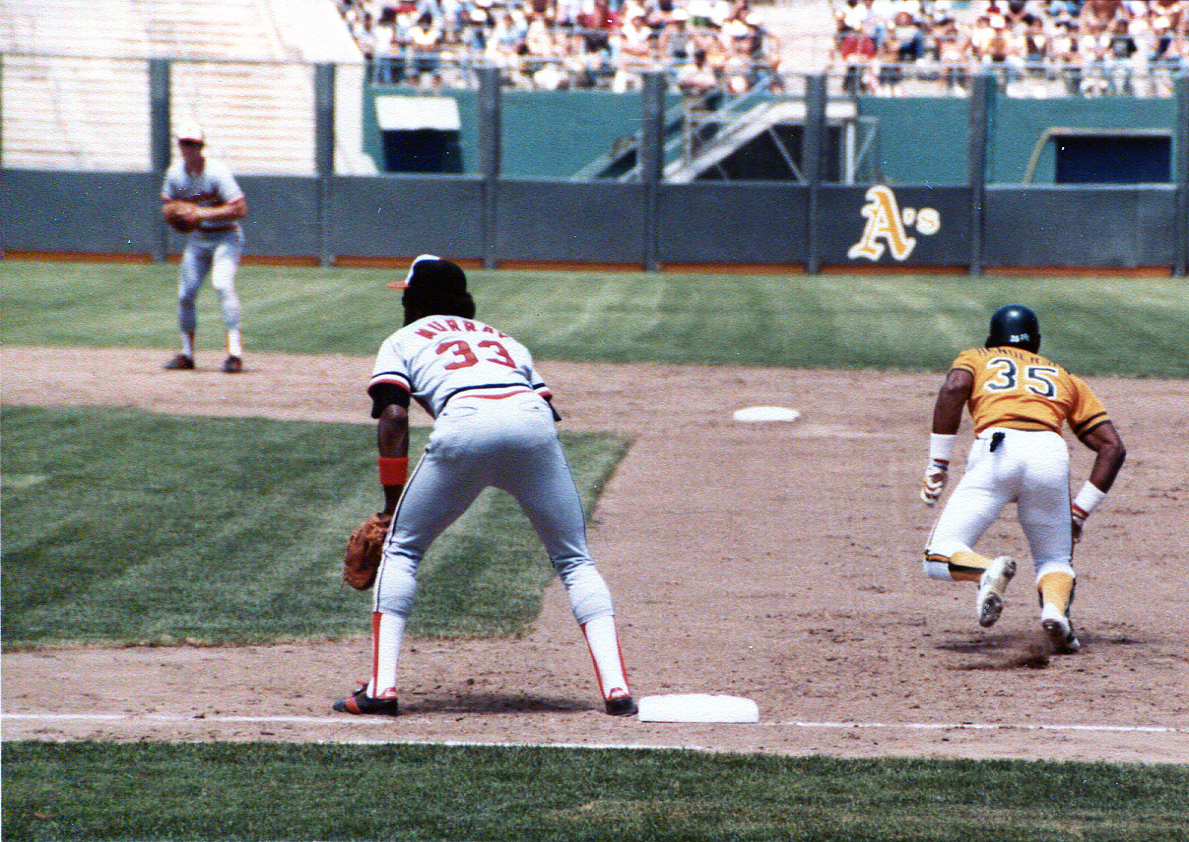
Rickey Henderson breaks for second base in 1983; fellow Hall of Famers Eddie Murray (33) and Cal Ripken Jr. share the field

- December 4 – The New York Yankees trade left-hander Ray Fontenot and outfielder Brian Dayett to the Chicago Cubs for pitcher Porfi Altamirano and Rich Bordi, catcher Ron Hassey and outfielder Henry Cotto.
- December 5:
  - In a seven-player blockbuster, the Oakland Athletics trade minor-league pitcher Bert Bradley and outfielder Rickey Henderson to the Yankees in exchange for pitchers Tim Birtsas, Eric Plunk, Jay Howell and Jose Rijo, and outfielder Stan Javier. Only 25, future Hall of Famer Henderson has led the American League in stolen bases for the past five seasons and holds the MLB record for thefts (130) in a season; he's already a four-time All-Star and has a Gold Glove Award on his resume.
  - The Texas Rangers sign designated hitter Cliff Johnson, granted free agency from the Toronto Blue Jays on November 8. Johnson, 37, batted .304 with 16 home runs in 127 games for Toronto in 1984.
  - The Yankees trade veteran catcher Rick Cerone to the Atlanta Braves for 22-year-old right-hander Brian Fisher.
- December 6 – In another headlining deal, the Chicago White Sox trade 1983 AL Cy Young Award winner LaMarr Hoyt and minor-league hurlers Kevin Kristan and Todd Simmons to the San Diego Padres for left-hander Tim Lollar, righty Bill Long, shortstop Ozzie Guillén and third baseman Luis Salazar. Hoyt, 29, went 24–10 (3.66) for the 1983 ChiSox, but dropped 18 games in 1984. Guillén is a 20-year-old prospect who will win 1985's AL Rookie of the Year Award and make three All-Star teams during his 13-year career with Chicago.
- December 7:
  - The Atlanta Braves sign free-agent future Hall-of-Fame closer Bruce Sutter (5–7, 1.54 ERA, and a league-leading 45 saves as a member of the 1984 St. Louis Cardinals). The terms of Sutter's contract are $9.1 million over six years—but also include annual deferred payments of at least $1.12 million for 30 years after his retirement. All told, his Braves contract will yield $45 million into 2022, which will be, coincidentally, the year of Sutter's passing.
  - The Milwaukee Brewers deal another future Hall-of-Fame pitcher, Don Sutton, to the Oakland Athletics for fellow right-hander Ray Burris and two young hurlers, Eric Barry and Ed Myers (PTBNL). Sutton, 39, went 14–12 (3.77) in 33 starts for Milwaukee in 1984; Burris, 34, was 13–10 (3.15) in 34 games (28 starts) for Oakland.
  - The Detroit Tigers trade third baseman Howard Johnson to the New York Mets for pitcher Walt Terrell. The swap helps both clubs: Johnson, 24, slugs 192 home runs in nine years as a Met and makes two NL All-Star teams, while Terrell, 26, wins 47 games between 1985 and 1987 as a member of the Tigers' starting rotation.
  - The Baltimore Orioles sign veteran outfielder Lee Lacy, granted free agency from the Pittsburgh Pirates on November 8.
  - The Chicago Cubs bring left-hander Steve Trout back into the fold for 1985. Trout had posted a 13–7 (3.41) record for the NL East champions in 1984 before being granted free agency in November.
  - The Montreal Expos and Chicago White Sox make two trades with each other on the same day. In one, Montreal sends pitcher Bob James to the ChiSox for second baseman Vance Law; in the other, the Expos deal infielder Bryan Little to the Pale Hose for pitcher Bert Roberge.
- December 8 – The Oakland Athletics send closer Bill Caudill to the Toronto Blue Jays for shortstop Alfredo Griffin, outfielder Dave Collins and cash. Caudill was an AL All-Star in 1984 and fanned the side in his one-inning appearance.
- December 10 – The Montreal Expos trade future Hall-of-Fame catcher Gary Carter to the New York Mets for shortstop Hubie Brooks, catcher Mike Fitzgerald, outfielder Herm Winningham and pitching prospect Floyd Youmans. Already a two-time All-Star Game MVP and "one of the most formidable and well-rounded catchers to ever crouch behind home plate," Carter, 30, will be central to the Mets' 1986 World Series victory.
- December 11 – The Baltimore Orioles sign 32-year-old, nine-time AL All-Star outfielder Fred Lynn (.271, 23 homers, 79 RBI), granted free agency from the California Angels on November 8.
- December 12 – The St. Louis Cardinals acquire left-hander John Tudor and outfielder Brian Harper from the Pittsburgh Pirates for outfielder George Hendrick and minor-league third baseman Steve Barnard. The 30-year-old Tudor, who was 12–11 (3.27) in 32 starts for Pittsburgh, will become a dominant hurler in 1985—winning 20 of his last 21 decisions (to go 21–8 overall) and leading the National League in shutouts (ten) to help the Redbirds capture the NL East and league championship; then he'll win two games in the World Series.
- December 13:
  - Two days after signing Fred Lynn, the Baltimore Orioles come to terms with another former California Angel, relief pitcher Don Aase. After Tommy John surgery cost Aase, 30, the entire 1983 season, he returned to the Angels in June 1984 to post a 4–1 (1.62) record with eight saves in 23 games and 39 innings pitched. He was granted free agency November 4.
  - The Chicago Cubs add depth to their pitching staff, signing right-hander Lary Sorensen, unconditionally released by the Oakland Athletics on October 16.
- December 14 – Outbidding three teams, including the NL champion San Diego Padres, the Cubs retain free agent Cy Young Award-winner Rick Sutcliffe, signing him to a five-year contract estimated to be worth $1.8 million annually. The deal makes Sutcliffe the highest-paid pitcher in MLB history. In inking their 1984 staff ace, the Cubs thus keep intact their "big three" of starting pitchers who became free agents in November: Sutcliffe, Dennis Eckersley and Steve Trout.
- December 19 – Designated hitter Dave Kingman, who slugged 35 home runs in 1984, returns to the Oakland Athletics after being granted free agency November 8.
- December 20 – The New York Yankees acquire infielder Dale Berra, pitcher Alfonso Pulido and outfielder Jay Buhner from the Pittsburgh Pirates in exchange for outfielder Steve Kemp and infielder Tim Foli. Berra, 28, an eight-year MLB veteran, is the second son of Hall of Famer Yogi Berra, now the Yankees' manager; when he reports to spring training in two months, he'll be the first major-leaguer to play for his manager-father since Earle Mack toiled for his legendary father, Connie, in 1914.
- December 21 – Minority partner Marge Schott, a prominent local Buick dealer, buys controlling interest in the Cincinnati Reds for a reported $24 million. She will prove to be a hands-on, albeit often controversial, owner/operator of the franchise until she sells it for $67 million in 1999.
- December 23 – Valuable spare outfielder and pinch hitter Johnny Grubb opts to remain with the world-champion Detroit Tigers. He had been granted free agency November 8.
- December 24 – Four days after he was granted free agency from the Oakland Athletics, first baseman Bruce Bochte signs a contract to return to the team. The 34-year-old, 11-year veteran will hit .295 with 125 hits in 128 games for Oakland in 1985.
- December 27:
  - The New York Yankees sign free-agent starting pitcher Ed Whitson, who had posted a 14–8 (3.24) record in 31 appearances for the NL champ San Diego Padres and saved the Padres' season with his clutch victory in Game 3 of the 1984 NLCS. Whitson, 29, will become best known in New York for his brawl with Bombers' manager Billy Martin in a Baltimore hotel bar in September 1985.
  - Right-hander Dave Rozema, who spent much of the 1984 season as the fifth starter for the Detroit Tigers, signs with the Texas Rangers. Like Whitson, he had been among the 54 players granted free agency on November 8.

== Movies ==
- The Natural

== Births ==
=== January ===
- January 3 – Neil Wagner
- January 4 – John Raynor
- January 6 – Jimmy Barthmaier
- January 7:
  - Carlos Corporán
  - Jon Lester
- January 8:
  - Jeff Francoeur
  - Kevin Whelan
- January 9 – Dustin Richardson
- January 10 – Hunter Jones
- January 12 – Scott Olsen
- January 14:
  - Erick Aybar
  - Mike Pelfrey
- January 16 – Matt Maloney
- January 18 – Justin Thomas
- January 21 – Robert Ray
- January 22 – Ubaldo Jiménez
- January 24 – Scott Kazmir
- January 25 – Tyler Graham
- January 30 – Jeremy Hermida
- January 31 – Josh Johnson

=== February ===
- February 2 – Chin-Lung Hu
- February 4 – Doug Fister
- February 9 – Dioner Navarro
- February 10:
  - Luis Cruz
  - Alex Gordon
- February 11 – J. R. Towles
- February 13:
  - Matt Buschmann
  - Brett Hayes
- February 15:
  - Mitchell Boggs
  - Nate Schierholtz
- February 18 – Brian Bogusevic
- February 20 – Brian McCann
- February 27:
  - Jumbo Díaz
  - Scott Mathieson
  - Aníbal Sánchez
  - Denard Span

=== March ===
- March 2 – Will Little
- March 8 – Yoshihisa Hirano
- March 9:
  - Elliot Johnson
  - Craig Stammen
- March 10 – Aaron Bates
- March 11 – Frank Mata
- March 12:
  - José Arredondo
  - Frankie de la Cruz
- March 14 – Randor Bierd
- March 16 – Harvey García
- March 19 – Matt Downs
- March 21 – Warner Madrigal
- March 22 – Joe Smith
- March 23 – Jon Link
- March 29 – Kila Ka'aihue

=== April ===
- April 3 – Kyle Phillips
- April 8 – Diory Hernández
- April 9 – Adam Loewen
- April 11:
  - Andrés Blanco
  - Alejandro De Aza
- April 14 – Christopher Leroux
- April 17 – Jed Lowrie
- April 18 – Marcos Mateo
- April 19:
  - Ambiorix Burgos
  - Jesús Delgado
- April 21 – Zach Kroenke
- April 23 – Dave Davidson
- April 25 – Robert Andino
- April 26:
  - Shawn Kelley
  - Brian Omogrosso
- April 27 – Luis Perdomo
- April 28:
  - Pedro López
  - Rómulo Sánchez
- April 29:
  - Cesar Carrillo
  - Billy Petrick

=== May ===
- May 4:
  - Sam LeCure
  - Kevin Slowey
- May 5 – Luis Valdez
- May 7 – James Loney
- May 8 – Adam Moore
- May 9:
  - Prince Fielder
  - Chase Headley
- May 10:
  - Kam Mickolio
  - Edward Mujica
- May 12 – Chris Robinson
- May 14 – Luke Gregerson
- May 15 – Everett Teaford
- May 16:
  - Jensen Lewis
  - Brandon Mann
  - Rafael Martin
- May 18:
  - David Patton
  - Joakim Soria
- May 24 – Héctor Ambriz
- May 25 – Graham Taylor
- May 27 – Miguel González
- May 30 – Frank Herrmann
- May 31 – Andrew Bailey

=== June ===
- June 1 – Wilkin Castillo
- June 5 – Robinson Chirinos
- June 6 – Emiliano Fruto
- June 7 – Justin Berg
- June 9 – Yuli Gurriel
- June 10 – Travis Chick
- June 12:
  - Roger Bernadina
  - Kyle McClellan
- June 14 – Jesús Guzmán
- June 15:
  - Tim Lincecum
  - Cliff Pennington
- June 16 – Jonathan Broxton
- June 18 – Fernando Rodriguez
- June 20 – Cole Gillespie
- June 21 – Gabe Morales
- June 22 – Cesar Ramos
- June 26:
  - Elijah Dukes
  - Luis Hernández
- June 28 – Clay Zavada
- June 29 – Hernán Iribarren

=== July ===
- July 1 – Rich Thompson
- July 2 – Wladimir Balentien
- July 7 – Alfredo Fígaro
- July 8 – Kevin Russo
- July 11:
  - Yorman Bazardo
  - Jon Meloan
- July 15:
  - Anthony Claggett
  - Brandon Gomes
- July 18:
  - Allen Craig
  - Michael Collins
- July 20:
  - Alexi Casilla
  - Danny Dorn
- July 26:
  - Kevin Jepsen
  - Brandon Morrow
- July 27:
  - Max Scherzer
  - Tsuyoshi Nishioka
- July 29:
  - Chad Billingsley
  - Mark Hamilton
- July 31 – Fernando Hernández

=== August ===
- August 1 – Brandon Kintzler
- August 2:
  - Luke Hughes
  - Konrad Schmidt
- August 3:
  - Germán Durán
  - Sergio Escalona
  - Matt Joyce
- August 5 – Sean Kazmar
- August 6 – Osiris Matos
- August 7 – Wade LeBlanc
- August 9 – Graham Godfrey
- August 10 – Jeff Marquez
- August 11 – Melky Cabrera
- August 13 – Boone Logan
- August 14:
  - Nevin Ashley
  - Clay Buchholz
- August 15:
  - Tyson Brummett
  - Jarrod Dyson
  - Chris Pettit
- August 19 – Marcos Carvajal
- August 20 – Jamie Hoffmann
- August 21:
  - Dustin Molleken
  - Melvin Upton Jr.
- August 22 – David Huff
- August 26 – Kyle Kendrick
- August 28 – Will Harris
- August 30 – Steven Wright

=== September ===
- September 2 – Dusty Ryan
- September 4 – Jason Donald
- September 7 – Mauro Gómez
- September 8:
  - Rob Delaney
  - Bobby Parnell
- September 9 – Brett Pill
- September 10 – Andrew Brown
- September 13 – Jesse English
- September 14:
  - Robert Mosebach
  - Josh Outman
- September 18 – Donald Veal
- September 19 – Danny Valencia
- September 21:
  - Joaquin Arias
  - Carlos Rosa
- September 23 – Matt Kemp
- September 24:
  - Scott Carroll
  - Rafael Rodríguez
- September 25:
  - Michael Crotta
  - Víctor Gárate
- September 27 – John Lannan
- September 28:
  - Thad Weber
  - Ryan Zimmerman

=== October ===
- October 1:
  - Matt Cain
  - Chris Johnson
- October 2:
  - Oswaldo Navarro
  - Matt Reynolds
- October 3 – Lance Barrett
- October 4 – Drew Stubbs
- October 10 – Troy Tulowitzki
- October 11 – Max Ramírez
- October 13:
  - Steven Lerud
  - Hayden Penn
- October 14 – Kris Johnson
- October 19:
  - James McDonald
  - Travis Schlichting
  - Josh Tomlin
- October 21:
  - Danny Herrera
  - José Lobatón
- October 22 – Takuya Asao
- October 24 – Lucas May
- October 26 – Jesús Flores
- October 29 – José Mijares
- October 30 – Shane Robinson
- October 31 – Anthony Varvaro

=== November ===
- November 1 – Stephen Vogt
- November 2 – Tommy Layne
- November 3:
  - Brandon Dickson
  - Jonathan Herrera
- November 6:
  - Ricky Romero
  - Atahualpa Severino
- November 9 – Joel Zumaya
- November 10 – Kazuhisa Makita
- November 12 – César Jiménez
- November 13 – Tony Abreu
- November 20 – Jo-Jo Reyes
- November 21 – Quintin Berry
- November 22 – Yusmeiro Petit
- November 23:
  - Robert Coello
  - Justin Turner
  - Casper Wells
- November 24 – Joel Guzmán

=== December ===
- December 3 – Tobi Stoner
- December 4 - Takayuki Kishi
- December 5 – Josh Lueke
- December 7 – Mike Baxter
- December 10 – Gregorio Petit
- December 11 – Josh Butler
- December 14 – Chris Heisey
- December 15:
  - Cole Garner
  - James Houser
- December 17 – Stuart Pomeranz
- December 18 – Josh Rodriguez
- December 19 – Ian Kennedy
- December 20 – Brian Abraham
- December 21 – Eddie Gamboa
- December 23 – Josh Satin
- December 26:
  - Darin Downs
  - Brett Sinkbeil
- December 28 – Barret Browning

== Deaths ==
=== January ===
- January 1 – Hazel Measner, 58, Canadian pitcher who played in the All-American Girls Professional Baseball League in its 1946 season.
- January 6 – Billy Lee, 89, who appeared in 25 games, chiefly as an outfielder, for the 1914–1915 St. Louis Browns.
- January 18 – Leo Kiely, 54, pitcher for the Boston Red Sox in the 1950s, who in 1957 set two PCL records with 20 wins in relief, 14 of them in consecutive games, and also became the first major leaguer to play in Japanese Baseball, for the Mainichi Orions, in 1953.
- January 22 – Johnny Spencer, 86, outfielder who played in 1921 and 1922 for the Pittsburgh Keystones of the Negro National League and the barnstorming Homestead Grays.
- January 24 – Bill Moore, 81, Detroit Tigers pitcher who faced three batters in his only MLB appearance, April 15, 1925; he walked all three (failing to record an out) and was charged with two earned runs, for a career ERA of "infinity."
- January 28 – Ray Harrell, 71, pitcher who worked in 119 total games over six seasons spanning 1935 to 1945 for five National League clubs, principally the St. Louis Cardinals and Philadelphia Phillies.
- January – Frank Russell, 62, second baseman, third baseman and outfielder for the Baltimore Elite Giants of the Negro National League (1943–1944, 1946, 1948).

=== February ===
- February 10 – Johanna Hageman, 65, one of the sixty original members of the All-American Girls Professional Baseball League in 1943.
- February 11:
  - John Douglas, 66, first baseman who appeared in five games and went hitless in nine at-bats for the Brooklyn Dodgers in 1945, the last season of the World War II manpower shortage.
  - Charley Suche, 68, southpaw who hurled in one game for the Cleveland Indians on September 18, 1938.
- February 14 – Loren Babe, 56, third baseman who played in 120 games for the New York Yankees (1952–1953) and Philadelphia Athletics (1953); later a minor league manager and MLB coach for the Yankees (1967) and Chicago White Sox (1979–1980 and 1983).
- February 19 – Bill Shores, 79, pitcher who worked in 96 career games for the 1928–1931 Philadelphia Athletics, 1933 New York Giants and 1937 Chicago White Sox; member of three World Series champion clubs (1929, 1930, 1933).
- February 20 – Dale Matthewson, 60, pitcher who made 28 total appearances for wartime 1943–1944 Philadelphia Phillies.
- February 26 – Joe Kuhel, 77, first baseman who played in 2,104 games for the Washington Senators and Chicago White Sox between 1930 and 1947; known for strong defense, batted .300 three times; manager of Senators in 1948 and 1949.

=== March ===
- March 6 – Eleanor Twitchell Gehrig, 80, philanthropist and widow of Lou Gehrig, who died June 2, 1941; donor to the Baseball Hall of Fame and causes supporting research into ALS.
- March 8 – Bruce Cunningham, 78, pitcher who appeared in 104 games for 1929–1932 Boston Braves.
- March 9:
  - Charlie Blackburn, 89, pitcher and University of Chicago grad who worked in seven games for the 1915 Kansas City Packers of the "outlaw" Federal League.
  - Ping Gardner, 69, pitcher in Negro leagues between 1923 and 1932; led Eastern Colored League in games lost (ten) in 1928.
- March 10 – Bill McGhee, 75, first baseman and left fielder who played 170 games for wartime 1944–1945 Philadelphia Athletics.
- March 14 – "Gentleman John" Enzmann, 94, pitcher for 1914 Brooklyn Robins and 1918–1920 Cleveland Indians, who made 67 MLB appearances; member of 1920 World Series champions.
- March 15 – Buckshot May, 84, pitcher whose 13 years in the minor leagues were punctuated by one game and one inning pitched for the Pittsburgh Pirates on May 9, 1924.
- March 18 – Charley Lau, 50, backup catcher and pinch-hitter for four MLB clubs between 1956 and 1967 who became a renowned hitting instructor, with the Chicago White Sox since 1982; earned fame as the Kansas City Royals' batting coach (1971–1978) where his star pupil was George Brett.
- March 20 – Stan Coveleski, 94, Hall of Fame pitcher who had five 20-win seasons with the Indians and Senators, and led Cleveland to the 1920 World Series championship with three victories over the Brooklyn Dodgers; spitballer led AL in ERA twice and strikeouts once.
- March 21 – Bob Rothel, 60, first baseman who played in four games for the Cleveland Indians in April 1945.
- March 26 – Norman "Bobby" Robinson, 70, centerfielder for the Baltimore Elite Giants and Birmingham Black Barons of the Negro leagues; due to an injury, lost his centerfield job to 17-year-old Willie Mays in 1948.
- March 27 – Oliverio "Baby" Ortíz, 64, Cuban pitcher who made two appearances as a starting hurler for the wartime 1944 Washington Senators.
- March 28 – Jess Pike, 68, outfielder who played 14 years in the minor leagues, but in only 16 games for 1946 New York Giants as a 30-year-old rookie.
- March 29 – Hugh Poland, 74, catcher in 83 games for four NL teams between 1943 and 1948; longtime scout for Giants in New York and San Francisco.

=== April ===
- April 2 – Ike Davis, 88, shortstop for the 1919 Washington Senators and 1924–1925 Chicago White Sox, appearing in 164 career games.
- April 5 – Chet Kehn, 62, pitcher for the 1942 Brooklyn Dodgers, and one of many players who only appeared in the majors during World War II.
- April 6 – Glenn Wright, 83, shortstop for the Pittsburgh Pirates, Brooklyn Robins/Dodgers, and Chicago White Sox between 1924 and 1935; batted .294 lifetime with 94 home runs in 1,119 games; member of 1925 World Series champion Pirates; later, a minor-league manager and longtime scout.
- April 8 – William Dyke, 77, second baseman who made two appearances for the 1942 Jacksonville Red Caps of the Negro American League.
- April 10 – Karl Spooner, 52, Brooklyn Dodgers southpaw who threw complete-game shutouts in his first two MLB appearances in September 1954 — striking out 27 and allowing only seven hits in 18 innings pitched; however, his pitching career was ultimately ruined by a shoulder injury sustained the following spring; appeared in 31 total National League games (1954–1955) and two World Series contests (1955, for the champion Dodgers).
- April 11 – Leo Dixon, 89, catcher for 1925 to 1927 St. Louis Browns and 1929 Cincinnati Reds, appearing in 159 career games.
- April 17 – Sanford Jackson, 84, centerfielder/shortstop/third baseman in the Negro leagues between 1924 and 1932, chiefly for the Chicago American Giants and Memphis Red Sox; two-time Negro World Series champion.
- April 26 – Alonza Bailey, 80, pitcher for the Newark Dodgers of the Negro National League in 1933 and 1934.
- April 29 – Howie Gorman, 70, outfielder who played in 14 games for the Philadelphia Phillies during 1937 and 1938.

=== May ===
- May 4 – Arthur "Lefty" Nelson, 67, who pitched in the Negro leagues for the 1937 Atlanta Black Crackers and 1938 Newark Eagles.
- May 11 – Earl Reid, 70, pitcher who appeared in two games (winning his only decision) for the Boston Braves in May 1946.
- May 13:
  - Walter French, 84, reserve outfielder who hit .303 lifetime in 397 career games for the Philadelphia Athletics (1923 and 1925–1929); member of 1929 World Series champions.
  - Russ Young, 81, switch-hitting catcher who got into 16 games for the 1931 St. Louis Browns.
- May 14 – Elmer Riddle, 69, standout pitcher for early 1940s Cincinnati Reds, posting a 19–4 mark in 1941 and leading NL in earned run average (2.24), then, two years later, leading his circuit in wins (21); member of 1940 World Series champions; brother of Johnny Riddle.
- May 15 – Nick Goulish, 67, outfielder and pinch hitter who got into 14 games for wartime 1944–1945 Philadelphia Phillies.
- May 16 – Andrew "Pat" Patterson, 72, six-time All-Star second baseman in the Negro leagues who played between 1934 and 1947; member, 1946 Negro World Series champion Newark Eagles.
- May – Leroy Sutton, 63, pitcher for six years (1940 to 1945) in the Negro American League for the St. Louis–New Orleans Stars, Chicago American Giants and Cincinnati–Indianapolis Clowns.

=== June ===
- June 7 – Rabbit Benton, 82, second baseman who played five games for the 1922 Philadelphia Phillies.
- June 9 – Bobby Rhawn, 65, infielder who played in 90 games for the New York Giants, Pittsburgh Pirates and Chicago White Sox from 1947 to 1949.
- June 14 – Duke Markell, 60, Paris-born pitcher of Jewish descent who worked in five games for the St. Louis Browns in September 1951; one of seven natives of France to play in MLB (as of 2025).
- June 17 – Jim Hegan, 63, five-time All-Star catcher for the Cleveland Indians (and member of 1948 World Series champions) and four other teams between 1941 and 1960, known for outstanding defense; later a longtime New York Yankees coach; son Mike had a long career as first baseman and broadcaster.
- June 24 – Jim Roberts, 88, pitcher who appeared in a dozen games for 1924–1925 Brooklyn Robins.

=== July ===
- July 4:
  - Reginald Hopwood, 78, left-fielder for the 1928 Kansas City Monarchs of the Negro National League.
  - Doyt Morris, 67, outfielder who appeared in six games with the Philadelphia Athletics in 1937.
- July 8 – Ralph Coles, 71, outfielder for the Cleveland Bears and Jacksonville Red Caps of the Negro American League from 1939 to 1941.
- July 9 – Charlie Uhlir, 71, outfielder for Chicago White Sox in 1934.
- July 11:
  - Moose Clabaugh, 82, outfielder who had an 11-game trial with 1926 Brooklyn Robins, the same season he slugged 62 home runs to lead the Class D East Texas League in round-trippers.
  - Lyle Luttrell, 54, shortstop who appeared in 57 games for the 1956–1957 Washington Senators.
- July 14 – Al Schacht, 91, pitcher (1919–1921) and coach (1924–1934) for Washington Senators famous for his on-field comedy routines with fellow coach Nick Altrock; also coached for Boston Red Sox (1935–1936); known as "The Clown Prince of Baseball", he continued to entertain fans at major and minor league parks thereafter.
- July 16:
  - Bernell Longest, 66, second baseman for the Chicago American Giants and Cleveland Buckeyes of the Negro American League between 1946 and 1948.
  - Ed Short, 64, Chicago White Sox front office executive from 1950 through 1970, and general manager from August 26, 1961 to September 2, 1970.
- July 22 – Johnny Washington, 68, three-time All-Star first baseman and 1940 Negro National League batting champion who played for the Pittsburgh Crawfords, New York Black Yankees and Baltimore Elite Giants between 1936 and 1948.
- July 24 – Jake Dunn, 74, played every position but catcher (though primarily a shortstop and right fielder) during his Negro leagues career from 1930 to 1943.
- July 31 – Beans Reardon, 86, National League umpire from 1926 to 1949 who worked in five World Series; known for his colorful arguments and continued use of the outside ("balloon") chest protector within the NL.

=== August ===
- August 3 – Elmer Smith, 91, outfielder in 1,012 games for five clubs, principally the Cleveland Naps/Indians, for ten seasons spanning 1914 to 1925; member of 1920 World Series champions.
- August 6 – Johnnie Dawson, 69, catcher who played for four Negro American League teams, notably the Kansas City Monarchs, between 1938 and 1942.
- August 8 – Bert Hamric, 56, outfielder by trade who appeared in ten MLB games as a pinch hitter for the 1955 Brooklyn Dodgers and 1958 Baltimore Orioles.
- August 14:
  - Spud Davis, 79, good-hitting catcher (.308 career average and 1,312 hits) who played in 1,458 games over 16 seasons (1928–1941 and 1944–1945) for four National League clubs; member of world-champion 1934 St. Louis Cardinals; later, a coach who managed 1946 Pittsburgh Pirates for three end-of-season games.
  - Lynn McGlothen, 34, pitcher for six MLB clubs between 1972 and 1982 who had his best years with the St. Louis Cardinals and Chicago Cubs; 1974 National League All-Star.
- August 15 – Tom Gee, 84, catcher for the 1925–1926 New York Lincoln Giants and 1926 Newark Eagles of the Eastern Colored League.
- August 16:
  - Tommie Aaron, 45, first baseman and left fielder who played for the Braves in Milwaukee and Atlanta, and Braves coach since 1978; younger brother of Hank Aaron.
  - Fred Hahn, 55, left-hander who pitched in one MLB game on April 19, 1952, for the St. Louis Cardinals.
- August 21 – Rufus Smith, 79, pitcher who appeared in one MLB game, starting and lasting eight innings, for the Detroit Tigers on October 2, 1927; he failed to gain the decision in a 5–4 Detroit win over Cleveland at Navin Field.
- August 22 – Roy Tyler, 84, outfielder who played for three Negro National League clubs between 1925 and 1933.
- August 23 – Charlie Robertson, 88, pitcher who spent most of his career with the Chicago White Sox; pitched a perfect game in 1923 against the Tigers in his fourth major league start; last survivor of the 1919 White Sox team.
- August 24 – Roy Easterwood, 69, catcher and pinch hitter who played in 17 games for the wartime 1944 Chicago Cubs.
- August 25:
  - Waite Hoyt, 84, Hall of Fame pitcher whose 237 victories included 20-win seasons for the Yankees in 1927–1928; won six World Series games, giving up only two unearned runs in three complete games in the 1921 Series; Cincinnati Reds' play-by-play broadcaster from 1942 to 1965.
  - Skeeter Scalzi, 71, infielder and pinch runner who appeared in 11 games for 1939 New York Giants; longtime minor-league manager.
- August 26 – Bill Trotter, 74, pitcher who worked in 163 games for the St. Louis Browns (1937–1942), Washington Senators (1942) and St. Louis Cardinals (1944).
- August 31 – Audrey Wagner, 56, All-Star outfielder in the AAGPBL who won three home run titles, a batting crown, and the 1948 Player of the Year Award.

=== September ===
- September 7 – Joe Cronin, 77, Hall of Fame shortstop and manager, and AL president from 1959 to 1973, who batted .301 lifetime and had eight 100-RBI seasons; managed Washington Senators to 1933 pennant at age 26, won 1946 flag with Boston Red Sox, and was general manager of the Red Sox from 1948 to January 1959.
- September 10
  - Jackie Gallagher, 82, right fielder who played in one game for the Cleveland Indians on August 24, 1923.
  - Johnny Marcum, 75, good-hitting pitcher (141 hits, .265 lifetime) who appeared in 299 American League games (including 195 mound appearances and 113 pinch-hitting assignments) for Philadelphia (1933–1935), Boston (1936–1938), St. Louis (1939) and Chicago (1939).
  - Specs Roberts, 77, pitcher who appeared for six Negro leagues clubs, most notably the Homestead Grays, between 1937 and 1945; went 5–0 and led Negro National League in winning percentage for 1939 Grays.
- September 11 – Paul Carter, 90, right-hander who pitched in 127 games for the 1914–1915 Cleveland Naps/Indians and 1916–1920 Chicago Cubs.
- September 14:
  - Edgar Barnhart, 79, St. Louis Browns pitcher who hurled one scoreless inning in his only MLB game, on September 23, 1924.
  - Jimmy Pofahl, 67, shortstop-second baseman for Washington who got into 225 career games between 1940 and 1942.
- September 26 – Walt Bashore, 74, outfielder and pinch hitter in ten games for the 1936 Philadelphia Phillies.

=== October ===
- October 1
  - Walter Alston, 72, Hall of Fame manager who guided Dodgers teams in Brooklyn and Los Angeles to seven National League pennants and four World Series championships between 1954 and 1976; his 2,040 wins ranked behind only John McGraw in NL history upon retirement.
  - Billy Goodman, 58, All-Star infielder, principally for the Boston Red Sox and Chicago White Sox, who won the 1950 AL batting title; later a coach for the Atlanta Braves.
- October 4 – Joe Marty, 71, center fielder who played 538 games for the 1937–1939 Chicago Cubs and 1939–1941 Philadelphia Phillies.
- October 7 – Art Butler, 96, shortstop/second baseman who appeared in 454 games for Boston, Pittsburgh and St. Louis of the National League from 1911 to 1916.
- October 13:
  - Dixie Carroll, 93, speedy outfielder who played in 15 games for the 1919 Boston Braves.
  - Ed Carroll, 77, pitcher for the 1929 Boston Red Sox.
  - George Kelly, 89, 6 ft 4 in (1.93 m), Hall of Fame first baseman, nicknamed "High Pockets", who batted over .300 six straight years with the New York Giants from 1921 to 1926; led NL in RBI (1920, 1924) and home runs (1921); later a coach and scout.
- October 15 – Red Cox, 89, pitched three games for the 1920 Detroit Tigers.
- October 19 – Del Lundgren, 85, pitched from 1924 through 1927 for the Pittsburgh Pirates and Boston Red Sox.
- October 21 – Johnny Rigney, 69, one of the Chicago White Sox' top pitchers in the years prior to World War II, who later became the club's farm system director and, from 1956 to 1958, co-general manager; husband of Dorothy Comiskey.
- October 22 – Babe Pinelli, 89, National League umpire from 1935 to 1956, previously a Reds third baseman; he worked in six World Series, last calling balls and strikes on Don Larsen's perfect game in 1956.
- October 25 – Joe Wiggins, 78, infielder who played in the Negro leagues between 1930 and 1934.
- October 26 – Gus Mancuso, 78, catcher who appeared in 1,460 games for five National League clubs between 1928 and 1945; played on five pennant winners and two World Series champions with the St. Louis Cardinals and New York Giants; two-time NL All-Star.
- October 27 – Hank Helf, 71, backup catcher who played for Cleveland Indians (seven total games in 1938 and 1940) and St. Louis Browns (71 games in 1946) who, in a 1938 publicity stunt, caught baseballs dropped from the top of the 708 ft (216 m) Cleveland Terminal Tower.

=== November ===
- November 7:
  - George Bennette, 83, outfielder for multiple clubs in the Negro National League (NNL) between 1921 and 1932.
  - John Griffin, 71, pitcher for the 1937 St. Louis Stars of the NNL.
- November 13 – Aubrey Epps, 72, catcher who appeared in only one MLB game on September 29, 1935, for the Pittsburgh Pirates, but went three for four (.750) and drove in three runs in a 9–6 loss to Cincinnati at Crosley Field; toiled for nine seasons (1933–1941) in the minor leagues.
- November 17 – Dewey Creacy, 84, third- and second baseman who played 15 seasons (1924–1938) in the Negro leagues, mainly for the St. Louis Stars and Philadelphia Stars.
- November 18 – Guido Rugo, 86, construction executive and one of the "Three Little Steam Shovels" as co-owner of the Boston Braves between 1944 and 1951.
- November 20 – Leon Williams, 78, pitcher, outfielder and pinch hitter who got into a dozen contests for the 1926 Brooklyn Robins.
- November 25 – Ival Goodman, 76, All-Star right fielder for the 1935–1944 Cincinnati Reds who led NL in triples twice.
- November 28 – Maurice Young, 79, pitcher for the 1927 Kansas City Monarchs of the Negro National League in 1927.
- November 30 – Chris Pelekoudas, 66, NL umpire from 1960 to 1975 who worked in two World Series and two NLCS.

=== December ===
- December 1:
  - Ted Page, 81, outfielder for the Newark Eagles of the Eastern Colored League and Pittsburgh Crawfords of the Negro National League between 1926 and 1937; named an All-Star in 1933.
  - Joe Rue, 86, American League umpire who worked 1,519 regular-season games, and 1943's MLB All-Star Game and World Series.
- December 7 – Howie Reed, 47, pitcher for five teams from 1958 to 1971, including the 1965 World Series champion Los Angeles Dodgers.
- December 12 – Gene Layden, 90, outfielder who appeared in three contests for 1915 New York Yankees.
- December 15 – George Tomer, 89, first baseman by trade who pinch-hit in one game for the St. Louis Browns on September 17, 1913; played 13 seasons in minor leagues.
- December 16 – Debs Garms, 77, outfielder and third baseman who won the 1940 NL batting title with the Pittsburgh Pirates.
- December 19 – Bill Warwick, 87, catcher who appeared sparingly (23 career appearances) for 1921 Pirates and 1925–1926 St. Louis Cardinals; member of 1926 World Series champions.
- December 20:
  - Walt "Cuckoo" Christensen, 85, longtime minor-league outfielder who hit .315 lifetime in 171 MLB games as a member of the 1926–1927 Cincinnati Reds.
  - Gonzalo Márquez, 38, Venezuelan first baseman who batted .625 in the 1972 postseason as an Oakland Athletics rookie.
  - Art McLarney, 76, shortstop who appeared in nine games for the 1932 New York Giants.
  - Steve Slayton, 82, pitcher who played for the 1928 Boston Red Sox.
- December 26 – Johnny Gill, 79, outfielder who played 118 career MLB games over six seasons between 1927 and 1936, most notably for the Chicago Cubs.
- December 27 – Shirley Petway, 76, 1932 catcher/outfielder who played in the Negro leagues between 1932 and 1944.
