= 1984 Junior League World Series =

Tournament information
- Location: Taylor, Michigan
- Dates: August 14–18

Final positions
- Champions: Pearl City, Hawaii
- Runner-up: Yabucoa, Puerto Rico

The 1984 Junior League World Series took place from August 14–18 in Taylor, Michigan, United States. Pearl City, Hawaii defeated Yabucoa, Puerto Rico in the championship game.

== Teams ==
United States	International
(Indiana) Fort Wayne, Indiana; St. Joe's Central; Central	Yabucoa, Puerto Rico Puerto Rico
(Delaware) Wilmington, Delaware; Brandywine; East	
(Texas) Brenham, Texas South
(Hawaii) Pearl City, Hawaii West

== Results ==
Opening Game
—	Texas	4
—	Delaware	3
Lower round 1
0–1	Delaware	8
0–1	Indiana	6

First round
1–0	Texas	13
—	Hawaii (F/8)	23
—	Indiana	4
—	Puerto Rico	5
Lower round 2
1–1	Texas	6
1–1	Delaware	4

Semifinals
1–0	Hawaii	15
1–0	Puerto Rico	4
Lower final
1–1	Puerto Rico	7
2–1	Texas	4

World championship
2–0	Hawaii	7
2–1	Puerto Rico	5

Consolation Round

—			Third-place game
			2–2	Texas	2
1–2	Delaware	5	2–2	Delaware	6
0–2	Indiana	4

1984 Junior League World Series Champions
Pearl City, Hawaii
