= Johnnie Dawson =

American baseball player (1914–1984)

- Catcher
- Born: November 8, 1914; Shreveport, Louisiana, U.S.
- Died: August 6, 1984 (aged 69); Los Angeles, California, U.S.

Negro league baseball debut
- 1938, for the Kansas City Monarchs

Last appearance
- 1942, for the Kansas City Monarchs
- Stats at Baseball Reference

Teams
- Kansas City Monarchs (1938); Chicago American Giants (1940); Memphis Red Sox (1940); Birmingham Black Barons (1942); Kansas City Monarchs (1942)

Johnnie Dawson (November 8, 1914 – August 6, 1984) was an American Negro league catcher between 1938 and 1942.

A native of Shreveport, Louisiana, Dawson made his Negro leagues debut in 1938 with the Kansas City Monarchs, and played with the Chicago American Giants and Memphis Red Sox in 1940. He returned to the Monarchs during their 1942 Negro World Series championship season, Dawson's final season in baseball. He died in Los Angeles, California in 1984 at age 69.
