= Norman Robinson (baseball) =

American baseball player

- Outfielder
- Born: April 1, 1913; Oklahoma City, Oklahoma, U.S.
- Died: March 26, 1984 (aged 70); Pacoima, California, U.S.
- Batted: Switch Threw: Right

Negro league baseball debut
- 1940, for the Baltimore Elite Giants

Last appearance
- 1952, for the Birmingham Black Barons

Teams
- Baltimore Elite Giants (1940, 1943–1947); Birmingham Black Barons (1947–1952)

Norman Wayne Robinson (April 1, 1913 – March 26, 1984) was an American Negro league outfielder for the Baltimore Elite Giants and Birmingham Black Barons between 1940 and 1952.

A native of Oklahoma City, Oklahoma, Robinson was the brother of fellow Negro leaguer Frazier Robinson, and played for Birmingham in the 1948 Negro World Series. He died in Pacoima, California in 1984 at age 70.
