= Brandon Mann =

American baseball playe and coach (born 1984)

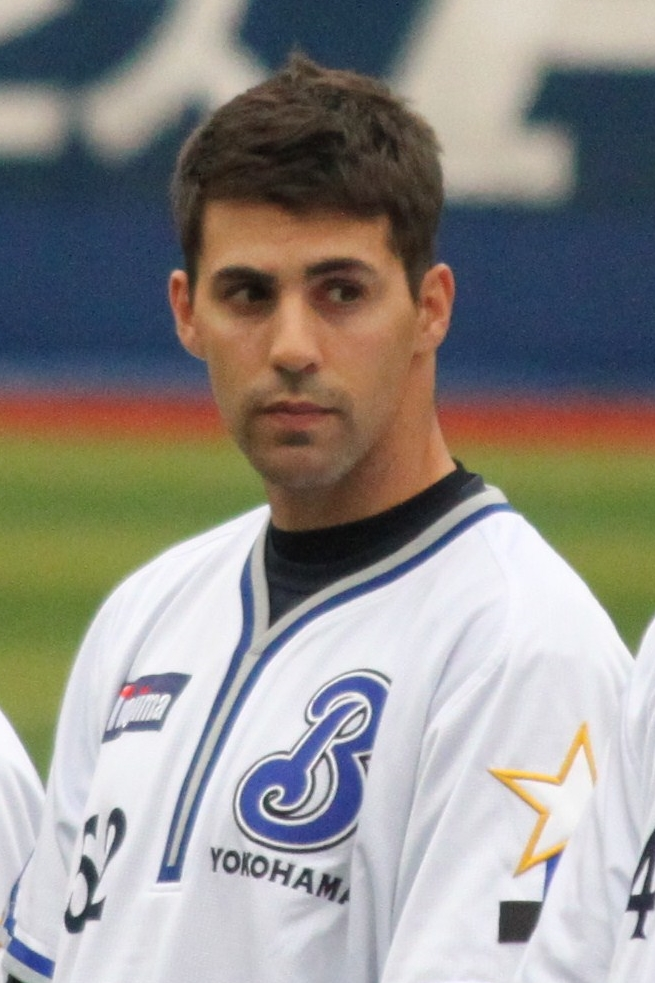
- Mann with the Yokohama BayStars

Miami Marlins – No. 52
- Pitcher / Coach
- Born: May 16, 1984 (age 42); Tacoma, Washington, U.S.
- Batted: Left Threw: Left

Professional debut
- NPB: August 27, 2011, for the Yokohama BayStars
- MLB: May 13, 2018, for the Texas Rangers
- CPBL: 2020, for the Rakuten Monkeys

Last appearance
- NPB: August 16, 2019, for the Chiba Lotte Marines
- MLB: September 29, 2018, for the Texas Rangers
- CPBL: 2020, for the Rakuten Monkeys

NPB statistics
- Win–loss record: 3–11
- Earned run average: 4.22
- Strikeouts: 79

MLB statistics
- Win–loss record: 0–0
- Earned run average: 5.40
- Strikeouts: 3

CPBL statistics
- Win–loss record: 0–2
- Earned run average: 7.08
- Strikeouts: 25
- Stats at Baseball Reference

Teams
- As player: Yokohama BayStars / DeNA BayStars (2011–2012); Texas Rangers (2018); Chiba Lotte Marines (2019); Rakuten Monkeys (2020); As coach: Miami Marlins (2024–present)

Brandon Michael Mann (born May 16, 1984) is an American former professional baseball pitcher and current bullpen coach for the Miami Marlins of Major League Baseball (MLB). He played in Nippon Professional Baseball (NPB) for the Yokohama BayStars/Yokohama DeNA BayStars and Chiba Lotte Marines, in Major League Baseball (MLB) for the Texas Rangers, and in the Chinese Professional Baseball League (CPBL) for the Rakuten Monkeys.

== Playing career ==
=== Tampa Bay Rays ===
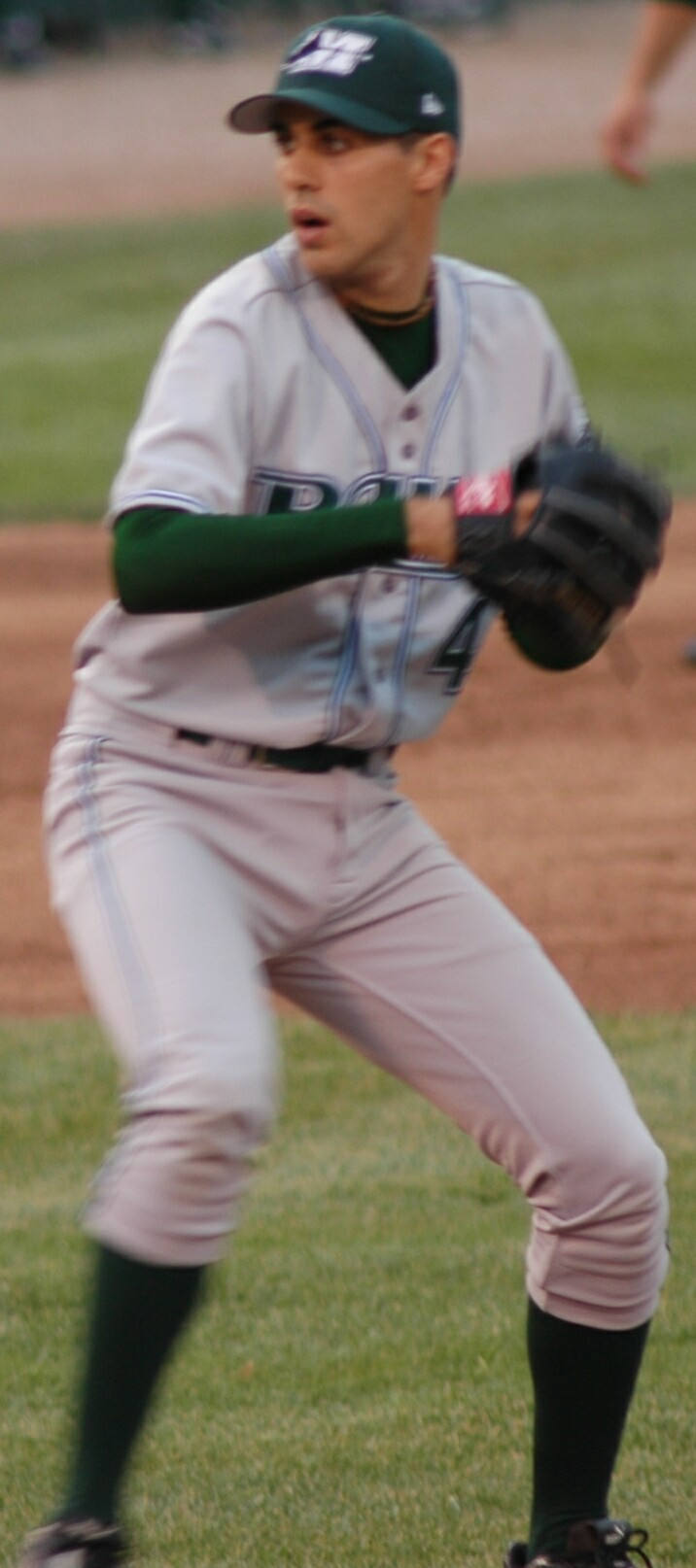
Mann with the Southwest Michigan Devil Rays

Mann attended Mount Rainier High School in Des Moines, Washington. The Tampa Bay Devil Rays selected Mann in the 27th round of the 2002 Major League Baseball draft and signed him to a $47,500 signing bonus, with an additional $40,000 for college expenses on July 7, 2002. He reached Double–A in Minor League Baseball for the Montgomery Biscuits in 2009. On November 9, 2009, Mann elected free agency.

=== Los Angeles Dodgers ===
On April 8, 2010, Mann signed a minor league contract with the Los Angeles Dodgers and was assigned to the Single–A Inland Empire 66ers. In 37 total appearances, he compiled a 3–0 record and 4.13 ERA with 48 strikeouts over 48 innings pitched. On August 19, Mann was released by the organization.

=== Southern Maryland Blue Crabs ===
Shortly after his release, Mann signed with the Southern Maryland Blue Crabs of the Atlantic League of Professional Baseball. On September 15, 2010, Mann earned his first win as a Blue Crab. He became a free agent after the season.

=== Yokohama DeNA BayStars ===
In 2011, Mann signed with the Yokohama BayStars of Nippon Professional Baseball (NPB). He played for the BayStars in 2012 as well, pitching to a 1.16 ERA in 2011, and a 5.32 ERA in 2012, with a 3-9 record and 59 strikeouts over two seasons.

=== Washington Nationals ===
On January 9, 2013, Mann signed a minor league contract with an invitation to spring training with the Washington Nationals.

=== Pittsburgh Pirates ===
Mann signed a minor league deal with the Pittsburgh Pirates on December 18, 2013. After starting the 2014 season with the Altoona Curve of the Double–A Eastern League, he was released on May 30, 2014.

=== Lancaster Barnstormers ===
After his release, Mann signed with the Lancaster Barnstormers of the independent Atlantic League of Professional Baseball for the remainder of the 2014 season. He had a 2–2 record and a 4.09 ERA in 20 games for Lancaster.

=== Fargo-Moorhead RedHawks ===
In 2015, Mann signed with the Fargo-Moorhead RedHawks of the independent American Association of Independent Professional Baseball. Mann set the American Association single-season strikeout record with 157 strikeouts in 143 2/3 innings pitched.

=== Oakland Athletics ===
After the season on October 6, 2015, his contract was purchased by the Oakland Athletics. On February 16, 2016, Mann received an 80-game suspension after testing positive for Ostarine, a performance-enhancing substance. After serving his suspension, he was activated on June 30 and assigned to the Arizona League Athletics. In his first start for the rookie league team, Mann pitched five innings and allowed no runs on two hits while walking two batters and striking out five. He was then promoted to the Midland RockHounds of the Double–A Texas League for his next start.

Mann spent the 2017 season with Double–A Midland, posting a 3–8 record and 4.40 ERA with 81 strikeouts in 75 2/3 innings pitched across 46 appearances. On November 6, 2017, Mann elected free agency.

=== Texas Rangers ===
On January 10, 2018, Mann signed a minor league contract with the Texas Rangers. He began the season with the Round Rock Express of the Triple–A Pacific Coast League, and pitched to a 1–0 win–loss record and a 1.04 earned run average before he was promoted to MLB on May 13. He made his MLB debut that same day against the Houston Astros, pitching 1 2/3 innings without allowing a run. At 33 years and 362 days old, Mann became the oldest player to make his MLB debut since Chang-Yong Lim in 2013 and the oldest North American player to make his MLB debut since Alan Zinter in 2002. On August 7, 2018, Mann was designated for assignment. He elected free agency following the season on November 2.

=== Chiba Lotte Marines ===
On January 14, 2019, Mann signed with the Chiba Lotte Marines of NPB for the 2019 season. On November 30, Marines announced that team will not signed with Mann for next season. On December 2, 2019, he become free agent. In 2019 with the Marines, Mann pitched to an 0-2 record with a 3.94 ERA and 20 strikeouts.

=== Texas Rangers (second stint) ===
On February 7, 2020, Mann signed a minor league contract with the Texas Rangers. He did not appear for the organization due to the cancellation of the minor league season because of the COVID-19 pandemic. Mann was released by the Rangers organization on June 1.

=== Rakuten Monkeys ===
On August 1, 2020, Mann signed with the Rakuten Monkeys of the Chinese Professional Baseball League. In 2020 for the Monkeys, Mann pitched to an 0–2 record with a 7.08 ERA and 25 strikeouts. He became a free agent after the season.

== Coaching career ==
=== Lotte Giants ===
On January 12, 2021, Mann was announced as the minor league pitching coordinator for the Lotte Giants of the Korea Baseball Organization.

=== Miami Marlins ===
Mann subsequently worked with Driveline Baseball, then joined the Miami Marlins as a pitching strategist prior to the 2024 season. On December 21, 2024, Mann was promoted to the role of bullpen coach.

== Personal life ==
Mann and his wife, Sarah, were married in November 2017. He is a devout Christian, and has noted on his profile page for Chiba Lotte Marines that Philippians 4:13 is his favorite Word in the Scriptures.
