= Reginald Hopwood (baseball) =

American baseball player

- Outfielder
- Born: February 5, 1906; Marlin, Texas, U.S.
- Died: July 4, 1984 (aged 78); Minneapolis, Minnesota, U.S.

Negro league baseball debut
- 1928, for the Kansas City Monarchs

Last appearance
- 1928, for the Kansas City Monarchs

NNL statistics
- Batting average: .118
- Home runs: 0
- Runs batted in: 1
- Stats at Baseball Reference

Teams
- Kansas City Monarchs (1928)

Reginald Lanier Hopwood (February 5, 1906 – July 4, 1984) was an American Negro league outfielder.

A native of Marlin, Texas, Hopwood played for the Kansas City Monarchs in 1928.

He was shot in the chest during an altercation outside a bar in St. Paul, Minnesota in June 1946.

He died in Minneapolis, Minnesota in 1984 at age 78.
