= John Griffin (baseball) =

American baseball player (1913–1984)

- Pitcher
- Born: October 30, 1894; Ferguson, Missouri
- Died: November 1984; St. Louis, Missouri
- Threw: Left

Negro league baseball debut
- 1937, for the St. Louis Stars

Last appearance
- 1937, for the St. Louis Stars

Teams
- St. Louis Stars (1937)

John Henry Griffin (August 17, 1913 – November 1984) was an American Negro league baseball pitcher in the 1930s.

A native of Ferguson, Missouri, Griffin played for the St. Louis Stars in 1937. In nine recorded appearances on the mound, he posted a 9.07 ERA over 42.2 innings. Griffin died in St. Louis, Missouri in 1984 at age 71.
