= Deaths in April 1990 =

The following is a list of notable deaths in April 1990.

Entries for each day are listed alphabetically by surname. A typical entry lists information in the following sequence:

- Name, age, country of citizenship at birth, subsequent country of citizenship (if applicable), reason for notability, cause of death (if known), and reference.

== April 1990 ==
=== 1 ===
- Benito Díaz, 91, Spanish footballer.
- Girard Edward Kalbfleisch, 90, American district judge (United States District Court for the Northern District of Ohio).
- Lillian Miller, 92, American television personality.
- Vince Pacewic, 69, American football player.
- Carlos Peucelle, 81, Argentine footballer.
- Bracha Tzfira, 79, Israeli musician and actress.
- Charles Spain Verral, 85, Canadian author.
- Russell Vis, 89, American Olympic wrestler (1924).

=== 2 ===
- Rafael Lorente de No, 87, Spanish neuroscientist.
- Aldo Fabrizi, 84, Italian actor and film director.
- Vanda Godsell, 67, English actress.
- Peter Jones, 60, British broadcaster.
- John Milton Roberts, 73, American anthropologist.

=== 3 ===
- Katharine Balfour, 69, American actress (America America, Love Story).
- Edward Carlson, 78, American businessman, cancer.
- Arthur Houghton, 83, American industrialist.
- Clair Huffaker, 63, American screenwriter.
- Frederick Keen, 91, Argentine cricketer.
- Willie Musarurwa, 62, Zimbabwean journalist.
- Sloan Nibley, 81, American screenwriter.
- Sarah Vaughan, 66, American singer, lung cancer.
- Otha Wearin, 87, American politician, member of the U.S. House of Representatives (1933–1939).
- Ivan Yarmysh, 65, Soviet Ukrainian Olympic racewalker (1952).

=== 4 ===
- Leonid Dushkin, 79, Soviet rocket scientist.
- Mark Fradkin, 75, Soviet composer.
- Robert Dixon Herman, 78, American district judge (United States District Court for the Middle District of Pennsylvania).
- Andrzej Kobyliński, 58, Polish Olympic equestrian (1960).
- Hubert Ogunde, 73, Nigerian theatre manager.
- Bernhard Rensch, 90, German evolutionary biologist.
- Cyrus Rowlett Smith, 90, American businessman and politician, secretary of commerce (1968–1969), cardiac arrest.
- Paul V. Yoder, 81, American musician.

=== 5 ===
- Carsten Byhring, 71, Norwegian actor, cancer.
- A. B. Masilamani, 75, Indian baptist pastor and evangelist.
- Louis Nelson, 87, American trombonist, traffic collision.
- Vic Samson, 98, Australian rules footballer.
- Lev Skvirsky, 86, Soviet general.

=== 6 ===
- Robert Abernathy, 65, American science fiction author.
- William Clark, 84, Scottish cricketer.
- Peter Doherty, 76, Northern Irish football player.
- James MacNabb, 88, British Olympic rower (1924).
- Joel de Oliveira Monteiro, 85, Brazilian football player.
- B. T. Ranadive, 85, Indian politician.
- Yevgeny Savitsky, 79, Soviet fighter ace during World War II.
- Alfred Sohn-Rethel, 91, French-German economist.
- Zeydin Yusup, 26, Uyghur independence activist, killed in action.

=== 7 ===
- J. Broward Culpepper, 82, American academic.
- Ronald Evans, 56, American astronaut (Apollo 17), heart attack.
- Kristian Gestrin, 60, Finnish judge and politician.
- Dick Lundy, 82, American animator.
- Alan Marsham, 69, Australian rules footballer.
- Arthur B. Singer, 72, American illustrator, esophageal cancer.

=== 8 ===
- Emerson Greenaway, 83, American librarian.
- Herman Jessor, 95, American architect.
- Percy Kay, 79, Australian rules footballer.
- Bill Kelly, 91, American baseball player (Philadelphia Athletics, Philadelphia Phillies).
- Hans Korte, 90, German general.
- J. Kenneth Robinson, 73, American politician, member of the U.S. House of Representatives (1971–1985), pancreatic cancer.
- Bellan Roos, 88, Swedish actress.
- Ernest Steward, 76-79, British cinematographer.
- Ryan White, 18, American HIV/AIDS poster child, AIDS.
- Zamazaan, 24-25, French Thoroughbred racehorse.

=== 9 ===
- Joe Asquini, 64-65, Canadian football player (Ottawa Rough Riders).
- Bill Bailey, 73, American NFL player (Brooklyn Dodgers).
- Aldo Bertocco, 78, Italian-French racing cyclist.
- Jack Dermody, 79, Australian footballer.
- John Henry Faulk, 76, American radio personality, cancer.
- Yngve Lindegren, 77, Swedish football player.
- Eric Lucke, 79, South African Olympic sports shooter (1960).
- James V. McConnell, 64, American zoologist, target of Ted Kaczynski.
- Mikio Narita, 55, Japanese actor, linitis plastica.
- Chips Sobek, 70, American basketball player.
- Astrid Sommer, 83, Norwegian actress.

=== 10 ===
- Margarete Adler, 94, Austrian Olympic swimmer and diver (1912, 1924).
- Sir Hugh Trefusis Brassey, 74, British soldier and magistrate.
- Fortune Gordien, 67, American Olympic discus thrower (1948, 1952, 1956).
- Gerhard Schrader, 87, German chemist.
- Harrison Lee Winter, 68, American judge.

=== 11 ===
- Harold Ballard, 86, Canadian sports executive.
- Klaas Bolt, 63, Dutch organist.
- Ronald Jasper, 72, British Anglican priest.
- Ivar Lo-Johansson, 89, Swedish writer.
- Margaret Carnegie Miller, 93, American heiress (Carnegie Corporation of New York).
- Phyllis Munday, 95, Canadian mountaineer, explorer, and humanitarian.
- Robert Reid, 91, American Olympic cross-country skier (1932).
- Natalino Sapegno, 88, Literary critic and Italian academician.

=== 12 ===
- John Bowe, 78, Australian rules footballer.
- John Brown, 74, New Zealand racing cyclist.
- Geoffrey Harrison, 81, British diplomat.
- Fuyuhiko Kitagawa, 89, Japanese poet and film critic.
- Jef Lahaye, 57, Dutch racing cyclist.
- Otto Neumann, 87, German Olympic runner (1928).
- Johnny Reder, 80, Polish-American baseball (Boston Red Sox) and soccer player, heart disease.
- Irving Terjesen, 75, American basketball player.
- Luis Trenker, 97, Italian film producer, writer, actor, and Olympian (1924).
- Albert van Schendel, 77, Dutch racing cyclist.

=== 13 ===
- Sundaram Balachander, 63, Indian musician and filmmaker, heart attack.
- Ivan A. Elliott, 100, American lawyer and politician.
- István Lovrics, 62, Hungarian Olympic basketball player (1948).
- Hans Reinerth, 89, German nazi archaeologist.
- Ratomir Čabrić, 71, Yugoslav footballer.

=== 14 ===
- Ahmed Balafrej, 81, Moroccan politician, prime minister (1958).
- Mario Frustalupi, 47, Italian footballer, traffic collision.
- Thurston Harris, 58, American singer, heart attack.
- Martin Kessel, 89, German writer.
- Alv Kjøs, 95, Norwegian politician.
- Günther Krupkat, 84, German science fiction author.
- Georges Lacombe, 87, French film director.
- Flor Lambrechts, 80, Belgian footballer.
- Doris Lusk, 73, New Zealand artist.
- Olabisi Onabanjo, 63, Nigerian politician.
- Marco Aurelio Robles, 84, Panamanian politician, president (1964–1968).
- Sabicas, 78, Spanish guitarist, pneumonia.
- Gerardus Siderius, 76, Dutch Olympic canoeist (1936).

=== 15 ===
- Ulrich Becher, 80, German author.
- Jock Bruce-Gardyne, 60, British politician, brain cancer.
- Anna Carena, 91, Italian actress.
- Greta Garbo, 84, Swedish-American actress (A Woman of Affairs, Anna Christie, Camille), pneumonia.
- Helmut Lemke, 82, German politician.
- Spark Matsunaga, 73, American politician, member of the U.S. Senate (since 1977), prostate cancer.
- Lawson P. Ramage, 81, American naval admiral Medal of Honor recipient, cancer.

=== 16 ===
- Mario Biancalana, 87, Brazilian Olympic fencer (1948).
- Peter J. Grant, 46-47, British ornithologist.
- Slim Keith, 72, American socialite and fashion icon, lung cancer.
- Ewald Kihle, 70, Norwegian footballer.
- James P. O'Donnell, 72, American author and journalist (The Bunker), lung and stomach cancer.
- Stephen Shadegg, 80, American political consultant, cancer.
- Mary Talbot, 86, American entomologist.

=== 17 ===
- Ralph Abernathy, 64, American civil rights activist, blood clot.
- Joseph E. Dillon, 69, American politician.
- Joseph McMillan Johnson, 77, American art director, cerebral hemorrhage.
- Michel Labadie, 57, Canadian ice hockey player (New York Rangers).
- Jafta Masemola, 60, South African anti-apartheid activist, traffic collision.
- Yuko Minamimura, 73, Japanese baseball player.
- Karl Walz, 89, German politician.
- Aubrey Williams, 63, Guyanese artist, cancer.

=== 18 ===
- John Antonelli, 74, American baseball player (St. Louis Cardinals, Philadelphia Phillies).
- Bob Drake, 70, American racing driver.
- Gory Guerrero, 69, Mexican professional wrestler, liver failure.
- David Jones, 70, Welsh cricketer.
- Frédéric Rossif, 68, French film and television director.
- Robert D. Webb, 87, American film director.

=== 19 ===
- Wally Coates, 79, Australian rules footballer.
- Dave Dexter, Jr., 74, American record producer.
- Sergey Filippov, 77, Soviet and Russianactor and comedian, cancer.
- Bob Kelsey, 64, Australian rules footballer.
- John W. Schwada, 70, American academic.
- Georgios Vikhos, 75, Greek Olympic sport shooter (1936, 1948).

=== 20 ===
- Francis William Holbrooke Adams, 85, American lawyer and police commissioner.
- N. H. Gibbs, 80, British academic.
- Alex McCrindle, 78, Scottish actor.
- George Reindorp, 78, British Anglican prelate.
- Horst Sindermann, 74, East German politician.

=== 21 ===
- Johnny Beazley, 71, American baseball player (St. Louis Cardinals, Boston Braves), cancer.
- R. B. Braithwaite, 90, English philosopher and theologian.
- Salvatore Cascino, 72, Italian Olympic racewalker (1948, 1952).
- Ralph Cowan, 87, Canadian politician, member of the House of Commons of Canada (1962-1968).
- Erté, 97, Russian-born French artist.
- Frank Lausche, 94, American politician, member of the U.S. Senate (1957–1969), governor of Ohio (1945–1947, 1949–1957), heart failure.
- Tadeusz Parpan, 70, Polish soccer player.
- Pavao Pintarić, 77, Yugoslavian Olympic fencer (1936).
- Bogusław Psujek, 33, Polish marathon runner, fall.

=== 22 ===
- Bob Davies, 70, American basketball player (Rochester Royals).
- Tony Jankowiak, 29, American racing driver.
- Bud Maxwell, 77, Scottish footballer.
- Rosalind Moss, 99, British Egyptologist.
- Albert Salmi, 62, American actor, murder-suicide.
- Gustaf Wejnarth, 87, Swedish Olympic runner (1924).
- Verda Welcome, 83, American politician.

=== 23 ===
- Paulette Goddard, 79, American actress, heart failure.
- Mason Ellsworth Hale, 61, American lichenologist.
- Vincent Joseph Hines, 77, American Roman Catholic prelate.
- José Passera, 75, Argentine Olympic sports shooter (1964).
- Mary Turner Shaw, 84, Australian architect.
- Charlie Wilson, 57, English career criminal (Great Train Robbery), shot.
- Pete Wojey, 70, American baseball player (Brooklyn Dodgers, Detroit Tigers).
- Teodor Zaczyk, 90, Polish Olympic fencer (1936, 1948).

=== 24 ===
- Vytautas Alantas, 87, Lithuanian-American writer, journalist, and political ideologue.
- Erik Eriksson, 75, Swedish footballer.
- Endel Pärn, 76, Soviet actor and singer.
- Kazem Rajavi, 56, Iranian human rights activist, shot.
- Vladimir Saprykin, 73, Soviet Red Army officer and war hero.
- Bianca Tchoubar, 79, French Ukrainian chemist specialising in reaction mechanisms.
- Laurie Yates, 67, Australian rules footballer.

=== 25 ===
- Irving Fiske, 82, American playwright, stroke.
- Dexter Gordon, 67, American jazz musician, kidney failure.
- Rufus "Speedy" Jones, 53, American jazz drummer.
- Fred Klein, 92, Dutch painter.
- John Watkins Oliver, 75, American district judge (United States District Court for the Western District of Missouri).
- Bernard C. Schoenfeld, 82, American screenwriter.
- Clifton Reginald Wharton, Sr., 90, American diplomat.

=== 26 ===
- Józef Kosacki, 81, Polish professor, engineer, and inventor.
- Jim Maguire, 71, Australian rules footballer.
- Menso Menso, 87, Dutch Olympic sprinter (1924).
- Carlos Pizarro Leongómez, 38, Colombian guerrilla leader, shot.
- Wesley Rose, 72, American record producer.
- John J. Winkler, 46, American philologist and Benedictine monk, AIDS.

=== 27 ===
- Tita Duran, 61, Filipino actress.
- Hal Gensichen, 69, American basketball player.
- Vladimir Kanygin, 41, Russian middleweight weightlifter.
- Alyce Mills, 91, American actress.
- Willy Pieper, 78, Swiss Olympic sailor (1936, 1952).
- Malwa Singh, 44, Indian Indian Olympic wrestler (1964).
- Bella Spewack, 91, Romanian-born American playwright.
- Vladimir Stoychev, 98, Bulgarian general and Olympic equestrian (1924, 1928).
- Chuck Weimer, 85, American football player.
- Earl Wilson, 84, American politician, member of the U.S. House of Representatives (1941–1959, 1961–1965).

=== 28 ===
- Enrique Accorsi, 73, Chilean Olympic fencer (1948).
- Edwina Dumm, 96-97, American cartoonist.
- Peter Fuller, 42, British art critic, traffic collision.
- Reg Nicholls, 68, Australian rules footballer.
- Neil Watson, 84, New Zealand politician.

=== 29 ===
- Enrique Almada, 55, Uruguayan actor and author, cancer.
- Max Bense, 80, German philosopher.
- Mieczysław Burda, 74, Polish Olympic ice hockey player (1948).
- Charley Davidson, 73, American baseball player.
- Margaret Hance, 66, American politician, cancer.
- Carl Hellmuth Hertz, 69, German physicist.
- Sammy Lawhorn, 54, American blues guitarist.
- Elise Constance Mourant, 68, New Zealand artist.
- Ray Poat, 72, American baseball player (Cleveland Indians, New York Giants, Pittsburgh Pirates).

=== 30 ===
- Ernst Berndt, 74, Czechoslovak track and field athlete and Olympian (1936).
- Ken Chisholm, 65, Scottish footballer.
- Herbert Jankuhn, 84, German archaeologist.
- Miklós Jós, 84, Hungarian writer.
- Reidar Nyborg, 67, Norwegian Olympic skier (1948).
- Zapu Phizo, 85, Indian-British Naga nationalist.
- Mario Pizziolo, 80, Italian footballer.
- Joshua Prawer, 72, Polish-Israeli historian.
- Paul Sears, 98, American ecologist.
- Josef Velek, 50, Czechoslovak journalist, drowned.
- Antoine Vitez, 59, French actor and theatre director.
- Archie Wright, 65, Scottish football player.
- Vasili Yermasov, 77, Soviet football player.
- Mark Zborowski, 82, Soviet anthropologist and spy.
