= 1990 in film =

The year 1990 in film involved many significant events as shown below. Universal Pictures celebrated its 75th anniversary in 1990, despite its actual 75th anniversary taking place in 1987.

== Highest-grossing films ==
The top 10 films released in 1990 by worldwide gross are as follows:

Highest-grossing films of 1990
Rank	Title	Distributor	Worldwide gross
1	Ghost	Paramount	$505,702,588
2	Home Alone	20th Century Fox	$476,684,675
3	Pretty Woman	Buena Vista	$463,406,268
4	Dances With Wolves	Orion	$424,208,848
5	Total Recall	Tri-Star	$261,317,921
6	Back to the Future Part III	Universal	$244,527,583
7	Die Hard 2	20th Century Fox	$240,031,094
8	Presumed Innocent	Warner Bros.	$221,303,188
9	Teenage Mutant Ninja Turtles	New Line	$202,084,756
10	Kindergarten Cop	Universal	$201,957,688

== Events ==
- March 2 – The Hunt for Red October is released. It is the first film in Tom Clancy's Jack Ryan franchise and is met with critical and blockbuster commercial success.
- March 23 – Pretty Woman is released and grosses $463 million, making Julia Roberts a worldwide star.
- March 30 – Teenage Mutant Ninja Turtles is released to massive box office success. At the time, it is the highest-grossing independent film in history.
- May 25 – Universal Pictures unveils a new opening logo with music composed by James Horner, which debuts on Back to the Future Part III. It is the first change to the Universal opening logo in 27 years.
- June 1 – CGI technique is expanded with motion capture for CGI characters, used in Total Recall.
- June 15 – Following a massive media and marketing blitz, Dick Tracy is released. Walt Disney Studios chairman Jeffrey Katzenberg expressed disappointment in a studio memo that noted that the film had cost about $100 million in total to produce, market and promote and with its disappointing performance claimed "We made demands on our time, talent and treasury that, upon reflection, may not have been worth it".
- June 22 – The use of real-time computer graphics or "digital puppetry" to create a character in a motion picture is performed, in RoboCop 2.
- July 4 – The first digitally-manipulated matte painting is used, in Die Hard 2.
- July 13 – Ghost, starring Patrick Swayze, Demi Moore and Whoopi Goldberg, is released and grosses $506 million, making it the third highest-grossing movie at the time.
- October 5 – Henry & June, the first film to be given an NC-17 rating by the MPAA, is released.
- November 9 – Kevin Costner's directorial debut, Dances with Wolves, is released. It later earns twelve Academy Award nominations and wins seven, including Best Picture and Best Director for Costner.
- November 16
  - Home Alone is released. It spends twelve consecutive weeks at number one on the United States box office, becoming both the highest-grossing film of the year and the highest-grossing comedy of all-time.
  - The Rescuers Down Under is considered as the first fully digital film ever made.
- December 24 – Tom Cruise and Nicole Kidman marry.
- Buchwald v. Paramount decided, a leading case on the financial rewards due to writers of film treatments.

== Awards ==
Category/Organization	48th Golden Globe Awards January 19, 1991		44th BAFTA Awards March 17, 1991	63rd Academy Awards March 25, 1991
Category/Organization	Drama	Musical or Comedy	44th BAFTA Awards March 17, 1991	63rd Academy Awards March 25, 1991
Best Film	Dances with Wolves	Green Card	Goodfellas	Dances with Wolves
Best Director	Kevin Costner; Dances with Wolves		Martin Scorsese; Goodfellas	Kevin Costner; Dances with Wolves
Best Actor	Jeremy Irons; Reversal of Fortune	Gérard Depardieu; Green Card	Philippe Noiret; Cinema Paradiso	Jeremy Irons; Reversal of Fortune
Best Actress	Kathy Bates; Misery	Julia Roberts; Pretty Woman	Jessica Tandy; Driving Miss Daisy	Kathy Bates; Misery
Best Supporting Actor	Bruce Davison; Longtime Companion		Salvatore Cascio; Cinema Paradiso	Joe Pesci; Goodfellas
Best Supporting Actress	Whoopi Goldberg; Ghost			
Best Screenplay, Adapted	Michael Blake; Dances with Wolves		Martin Scorsese and Nicholas Pileggi; Goodfellas	Michael Blake; Dances with Wolves
Best Screenplay, Original	Michael Blake; Dances with Wolves		Giuseppe Tornatore; Cinema Paradiso	Bruce Joel Rubin; Ghost
Best Original Score	The Sheltering Sky; Ryuichi Sakamoto and Richard Horowitz		Cinema Paradiso; Ennio Morricone and Andrea Morricone	Dances with Wolves; John Barry
Best Original Song	"Blaze of Glory"; Young Guns II		N/A	"Sooner or Later"; Dick Tracy
Best Foreign Language Film	Cyrano de Bergerac		Cinema Paradiso	Journey of Hope

Palme d'Or (Cannes Film Festival)

Wild at Heart, directed by David Lynch, United States

Golden Lion (Venice Film Festival)

Rosencrantz & Guildenstern Are Dead, directed by Tom Stoppard, United Kingdom / United States

Golden Bear (Berlin International Film Festival)

Larks on a String (Skřivánci na niti), directed by Jiří Menzel, Czechoslovakia
Music Box, directed by Costa-Gavras, United States

People's Choice Award (Toronto International Film Festival):

Cyrano de Bergerac , directed by Jean-Paul Rappeneau, France

== 1990 films ==
=== By country/region ===
- List of American films of 1990
- List of Argentine films of 1990
- List of Australian films of 1990
- List of Bangladeshi films of 1990
- List of British films of 1990
- List of Canadian films of 1990
- List of French films of 1990
- List of Hong Kong films of 1990
- List of Indian films of 1990
  - List of Hindi films of 1990
  - List of Kannada films of 1990
  - List of Malayalam films of 1990
  - List of Marathi films of 1990
  - List of Tamil films of 1990
  - List of Telugu films of 1990
- List of Japanese films of 1990
- List of Mexican films of 1990
- List of Pakistani films of 1990
- List of Soviet films of 1990
- List of South Korean films of 1990
- List of Spanish films of 1990

=== By genre/medium ===
- List of action films of 1990
- List of animated feature films of 1990
- List of avant-garde films of 1990
- List of crime films of 1990
- List of comedy films of 1990
- List of drama films of 1990
- List of horror films of 1990
- List of science fiction films of 1990
- List of thriller films of 1990
- List of western films of 1990

== Births ==
- January 1 – Tom Ackerley, British producer and former assistant director
- January 7 – Liam Aiken, American actor
- January 13 – Liam Hemsworth, Australian actor
- January 14 – Grant Gustin, American actor and singer
- January 15
  - Sidney Franklin, American actor
  - Chris Warren, American actor
- January 18 – Zeeko Zaki, Egyptian-born American actor
- January 19 – Shaunette Renée Wilson, Guyanese-born American actress
- January 21
  - Kelly Rohrbach, American actress
  - Jacob Smith, American actor
- January 22 – Phil Wang, British-Malaysian stand-up comedian, writer and actor
- January 23 – Joel Basman, Swiss actor
- January 25 – Dustin Ingram, American actor and musician
- January 26 – Christopher Massey, American actor, comedian and rapper
- January 29 – François Civil, French actor
- January 30
  - Eiza González, Mexican actress and singer
  - Jake Thomas, American actor and voice actor
- January 31 – Siobhán Cullen, Irish actress
- February 1 – Toby Onwumere, Nigerian-American actor
- February 2 – Julia Fox, Italian-American actress
- February 4 – Will Denton, American actor
- February 5
  - Charlbi Dean, South African actress and model (died 2022)
  - Anthony Ingruber, Dutch-Australian actor and impressionist
- February 8
  - Christian Madsen, American actor
  - Ben Schnetzer, American actor
- February 9 – Tyson Houseman, Canadian actor
- February 10 – Trevante Rhodes, American actor
- February 11 – Q'orianka Kilcher, American actress
- February 15
  - Isabella Giovinazzo, Australian actress
  - Callum Turner, British actor and model
- February 16 – The Weeknd, Canadian singer-songwriter
- February 20 – Sean Sagar, British actor
- February 21 – Flavio Aquilone, Italian voice actor
- February 28
  - Alice Kremelberg, American actress and writer
  - Georgina Leonidas, British actress
- March 1 – Harry Eden, British actor
- March 2 – Tiger Shroff, Indian actor
- March 5 - Matt Rogers, American comedian, actor, writer and television host
- March 11 – Reiley McClendon, American actor
- March 12 – Jörgen Liik, Estonian actor
- March 13 – Sasha Clements, Canadian actress
- March 20 – Stacy Martin, French actress
- March 24 – Keisha Castle-Hughes, Australian-New Zealand actress
- March 25 – Kiowa Gordon, American actor of Hualapai descent
- March 26 – Choi Woo-shik, Korean-Canadian actor
- March 27 - Michael Vlamis, American actor, screenwriter, director and producer
- March 28 – Laura Harrier, American actress
- March 29 – Josh Blaylock, American actor
- March 30 – Chelsea Harris, American actress
- April 1 - Tess Haubrich, Australian actress
- April 5 – Haruma Miura, Japanese actor (died 2020)
- April 6 – Charlie McDermott, American actor and musician
- April 9 – Kristen Stewart, American actress
- April 10 – Alex Pettyfer, English actor and model
- April 12
  - Jamie Muscato, English actor and singer
  - Eline Powell, Belgian actress
- April 15 – Emma Watson, English actress
- April 16 – Lorraine Nicholson, American actress
- April 17 – Gia Mantegna, American actress
- April 18 – Britt Robertson, American actress
- April 23 – Dev Patel, British actor
- April 25 – Meghann Fahy, American actress
- April 27 - Lou de Laâge, French actress
- May 1 – Caitlin Stasey, Australian actress and singer
- May 2 – Kay Panabaker, American retired actress
- May 3 – Harvey Guillén, American actor
- May 6 – Moses Storm, American writer, actor and comedian
- May 9 - Maya Eshet, Israeli actress
- May 14
  - Rea Lest-Liik, Estonia actress
  - Sasha Spielberg, American actress, daughter of producer/director Steven Spielberg and actress Kate Capshaw
- May 15 – Sophie Cookson, English actress
- May 16
  - Deniz Akdeniz, Australian actor
  - Thomas Brodie-Sangster, British actor
  - Marc John Jefferies, American actor
- May 17
  - Ross Butler, American actor
  - Leven Rambin, American actress
- May 18 – Luke Kleintank, American actor
- May 20 – Josh O'Connor, British actor
- May 24 – Félix Moati, French actor, director and screenwriter
- May 26 – Madeleine Mantock, British actress
- May 27 – Chris Colfer, American actor and singer
- May 30
  - Sai Bennett, English actress
  - Im Yoon-ah, South Korean actress
  - Mason Lee, Taiwanese-American actor
- May 31 – Phillipa Soo, American actress and singer
- June 2
  - Brittany Curran, American actress
  - Jack Lowden, Scottish actor
- June 13 – Aaron Taylor-Johnson, British actor
- June 15 – Denzel Whitaker, American actor
- June 17 – Monica Barbaro, American actress
- June 18 – Jeremy Irvine, English actor
- June 20 – Jacob Wysocki, American actor and comedian
- June 26 – Brandon Sklenar, American actor
- July 2 – Margot Robbie, Australian actress
- July 4
  - Melissa Barrera, Mexican actress and singer
  - David Kross, German actor
- July 5 - Rosalind Ross, American screenwriter and director
- July 6 – Jeremy Suarez, American actor
- July 11 – Connor Paolo, American actor
- July 12 – Rachel Brosnahan, American-British actress
- July 13 – Nomzamo Mbatha, South African actress and television personality
- July 15
  - Olly Alexander, British musician, actor and screenwriter
  - Alexander Calvert, Canadian actor
- July 16
  - Eddie Hassell, American actor (died 2020)
  - James Maslow, American actor
- July 19 – Steven Anthony Lawrence, American actor
- July 24 – Daveigh Chase, American actress (died 2026)
- July 27 – Indiana Evans, Australian actress and singer-songwriter
- July 29 – Matt Prokop, American actor
- July 30 – Eliot Sumner, English singer-songwriter and actor
- July 31 – Ruby Modine, American actress, model and singer
- August 1 – Jack O'Connell, English actor
- August 4 – Chet Hanks, American actor and musician
- August 8 - Aiysha Hart, British-Saudi actress
- August 9
  - Bill Skarsgård, Swedish actor
  - Emily Tennant, Canadian actress
  - Adelaide Kane, Australian actress and model
- August 10 – Lucas Till, American actor
- August 15 – Jennifer Lawrence, American actress
- August 17 – Rachel Hurd-Wood, British actress
- August 20 – Win Morisaki, Burmese singer and actor
- August 21 - Bo Burnham, American actor, comedian, musician and filmmaker
- August 23 – Wesley Singerman, American record producer, songwriter and guitarist, and voice actor
- August 24 – Elizabeth Debicki, Australian actress
- August 29
  - Nicole Gale Anderson, American actress
  - Erika Harlacher, American voice actress
- September 1 – Aisling Loftus, English actress
- September 3 – Bianca Bin, Brazilian actress
- September 9
  - Sarah Baker, American actress and comedian
  - Klaudia Tiitsmaa, Estonian actress
- September 11 – Georgina Terry, British actress
- September 15 – Matt Shively, American actor
- September 20 – Saara Pius, Estonian actress
- September 21
  - Christian Serratos, American actress
  - Allison Scagliotti, American actress and director
- September 27 – Lola Kirke, American actress and singer
- September 28 – Kirsten Prout, Canadian actress
- September 30 – Caren Pistorius, New Zealand actress
- October 2 – Samantha Barks, Manx actress and singer
- October 3 - Michele Morrone, Italian actor and singer
- October 5
  - Wesley Morgan, Canadian actor and model
  - Taylour Paige, American actress and dancer
- October 6
  - Scarlett Byrne, English actress and model
  - Noah Robbins, American actor
- October 8 – Tom Rhys Harries, Welsh actor
- October 13
  - Florian Munteanu, German-Romanian actor and model
  - Himesh Patel, British actor
- October 18 – Carly Schroeder, American actress
- October 22 – Jonathan Lipnicki, American actor
- October 31 – Patti Harrison, Vietnamese-American comedian and actress
- November 2 – Kendall Schmidt, American actor
- November 4 – Jean-Luc Bilodeau, Canadian actor
- November 6 – Bowen Yang, Australian-born American comedian, writer and actor
- November 9 – Chris Di Staulo, Canadian filmmaker (died 2025)
- November 14 – Jessica Jacobs, Australian actress and singer (died 2008)
- November 16 – Milo Gibson, American actor
- November 18 – Matt Milne, English actor and director
- November 24 – Sarah Hyland, American actress
- November 25 – Stephanie Hsu, American actress
- November 26 – Rita Ora, British actress, singer and songwriter
- November 28 – Carla Diaz, Brazilian actress
- November 29 – Diego Boneta, Mexican actor, producer and singer
- December 10 – Teyana Taylor, American singer-songwriter and actress
- December 20
  - JoJo, American singer-songwriter and actress
  - Bugzy Malone, British rapper and actor
- December 21 - Mandeep Dhillon, British actress and singer
- December 23
  - Moses J. Moseley, American actor, writer and model (died 2022)
  - Anna Maria Perez de Tagle, American actress and singer
- December 29 - Brian Vernel, Scottish actor

== Deaths ==
Month	Date	Name	Age	Country	Profession	Notable films
January	2	Alan Hale Jr.	68	US	Actor	Hang 'Em High; Johnny Dangerously
January	5	Arthur Kennedy	75	US	Actor	Lawrence of Arabia; Some Came Running
January	6	Ian Charleson	40	UK	Actor	Chariots of Fire; Gandhi
January	6	Peter Cookson	76	US	Actor	Swingtime Johnny; Detective Kitty O'Day
January	8	Terry-Thomas	78	UK	Actor	Bachelor Flat; It's a Mad, Mad, Mad, Mad World
January	10	Lyle R. Wheeler	84	US	Art Director	Gone with the Wind; The Day the Earth Stood Still
January	14	John Witty	74	UK	Actor	The Frightened City; The Vault of Horror
January	15	Gordon Jackson	66	UK	Actor	The Great Escape; The Ipcress File
January	20	John Maxim	64	UK	Actor	The Frightened City; Dracula: Prince of Darkness
January	20	Barbara Stanwyck	82	US	Actress	Double Indemnity; Stella Dallas
January	25	Ava Gardner	67	US	Actress	The Barefoot Contessa; The Killers
January	26	Dodo Abashidze	66	Georgia	Director	The Legend of Suram Fortress; Ashik Kerib
January	27	Helen Jerome Eddy	92	US	Actress	Girls Demand Excitement; A Shot in the Dark
February	2	Hans Schumm	93	Germany	Actor	Spy Smasher; The Great Dictator
February	6	John Merivale	72	Canada	Actor	The List of Adrian Messenger; Arabesque
February	6	Jimmy Van Heusen	77	US	Songwriter	Going My Way; The Joker Is Wild
February	8	Frank Ross	85	US	Producer	The Devil and Miss Jones; The Robe
February	13	Ken Lynch	79	US	Actor	North by Northwest; Anatomy of a Murder
February	14	Jean Wallace	66	US	Actress	Lancelot and Guinevere; No Blade of Grass
February	15	Henry Brandon	77	Germany	Actor	The War of the Worlds; The Searchers
February	15	Michel Drach	59	France	Director, Screenwriter, Producer	Amelie or The Time to Love; The Simple Past
February	16	Joshua Shelley	70	US	Actor	All the President's Men; Funny Lady
February	17	Allen Rivkin	86	US	Screenwriter	Dancing Lady; The Farmer's Daughter
February	19	Gabriel Katzka	59	US	Producer	Kelly's Heroes; The Taking of Pelham One Two Three
February	19	Michael Powell	84	UK	Director	Black Narcissus; A Matter of Life and Death
February	28	Fabia Drake	86	UK	Actress	A Room with a View; Year of the Dragon
March	5	Gary Merrill	74	US	Actor	All About Eve; Twelve O'Clock High
March	17	Capucine	62	Switzerland	Actress	The Pink Panther; North to Alaska
March	18	Robin Harris	36	US	Actor, Comedian	Do the Right Thing; House Party
March	20	Maurice Cloche	82	France	Director	Monsieur Vincent; Doctor Laennec
March	28	Helene Reynolds	75	US	Actress	Moontide; The Man Who Wouldn't Die
April	2	Aldo Fabrizi	84	Italy	Actor	Open City; Cops and Robbers
April	3	Clair Huffaker	63	US	Screenwriter	The War Wagon; 100 Rifles
April	8	Ernest Steward	79	UK	Cinematographer	Some Girls Do; Quest for Love
April	11	Vanda Godsell	67	UK	Actress	This Sporting Life; A Shot in the Dark
April	15	Greta Garbo	84	Sweden	Actress	Grand Hotel; Ninotchka
April	17	Joseph McMillan Johnson	77	US	Art Director, Production Designer, Visual Effects Artist	Portrait of Jennie; Rear Window
April	18	Robert D. Webb	87	US	Director	Beneath the 12-Mile Reef; Love Me Tender
April	20	Alex McCrindle	78	UK	Actor	Star Wars; Eye of the Needle
April	22	Albert Salmi	62	US	Actor	The Brothers Karamazov; The Bravados
April	23	Paulette Goddard	79	US	Actress	So Proudly We Hail!; Modern Times
April	25	Dexter Gordon	67	US	Musician, Actor	Round Midnight; Awakenings
April	27	Bella Spewack	91	US	Screenwriter	My Favorite Wife; Week-End at the Waldorf
May	1	Sunset Carson	69	US	Actor	Sheriff of Cimarron; Alias Billy the Kid
May	2	David Rappaport	38	US	Actor	Time Bandits; Turkish Delight
May	6	Charles Farrell	89	US	Actor	Lucky Star; 7th Heaven
May	10	Susan Oliver	58	US	Actress	The Disorderly Orderly; Your Cheatin' Heart
May	12	Anthony Masters	70	UK	Production Designer	2001: A Space Odyssey; Dune
May	12	Nate Monaster	78	US	Screenwriter	That Touch of Mink; How to Save a Marriage and Ruin Your Life
May	14	Franklyn Seales	37	West Indies	Actor	The Onion Field; Southern Comfort
May	16	Sammy Davis Jr.	64	US	Actor, Singer	Ocean's 11; Robin and the 7 Hoods
May	16	Jim Henson	53	US	Puppeteer, Director, Screenwriter, Producer	The Dark Crystal; The Muppet Movie
May	18	Jill Ireland	54	UK	Actress	Hard Times; Breakheart Pass
May	22	Max Wall	82	UK	Actor	Chitty Chitty Bang Bang; Jabberwocky
May	25	Vic Tayback	60	US	Actor	Alice Doesn't Live Here Anymore; Bullitt
June	1	Eric Barker	78	UK	Actor	Those Magnificent Men in their Flying Machines; There's a Girl in My Soup
June	2	Rex Harrison	82	UK	Actor	My Fair Lady; Doctor Dolittle
June	3	Tom Brown	70	US	Actor	Duke of Chicago; I Killed Wild Bill Hickok
June	4	Jack Gilford	81	US	Actor	A Funny Thing Happened on the Way to the Forum; Catch-22
June	6	Marcel Grignon	75	France	Cinematographer	Is Paris Burning?; The Fixer
June	7	Barbara Baxley	67	US	Actress	East of Eden; No Way to Treat a Lady
June	15	Leonard Sachs	80	UK	Actor	Thunderball; John Wesley
June	20	Ina Balin	52	US	Actress	From the Terrace; The Patsy
June	23	Frank Gatliff	62	UK	Actor	The Ipcress File; Operation Daybreak
June	25	Sydney Boehm	82	US	Screenwriter	Seven Thieves; The Big Heat
July	8	Howard Duff	76	US	Actor	Kramer vs. Kramer; The Naked City
July	13	Lois Moran	81	US	Actress	Words and Music; Under Suspicion
July	14	Philip Leacock	74	UK	Director	The War Lover; Let No Man Write My Epitaph
July	15	Margaret Lockwood	73	UK	Actress	The Lady Vanishes; Night Train to Munich
July	15	Bud Thackery	87	US	Cinematographer	The Crimson Ghost; Coogan's Bluff
July	19	Eddie Quillan	83	US	Actor	Mutiny on the Bounty; The Big Shot
July	20	Sergei Parajanov	66	Georgia	Director	Shadows of Forgotten Ancestors; The Color of Pomegranates
July	21	Stanley Shapiro	65	US	Screenwriter	Pillow Talk; That Touch of Mink
July	23	Georges Flamant	86	France	Actor	La Chienne; The 400 Blows
July	27	Elizabeth Allan	80	UK	Actress	David Copperfield; Camille
July	27	Ernest Archer	80	UK	Art Director	Superman; The Pirates of Penzance
July	28	Jill Esmond	82	UK	Actress	Thirteen Women; No Funny Business
August	2	Edwin Richfield	68	UK	Actor, Screenwriter	Ben-Hur; The Dam Busters
August	3	Betty Amann	85	Germany	Actress	Strictly Business; In Old Mexico
August	12	Dorothy Mackaill	87	US	Actress	No Man of Her Own; Safe in Hell
August	12	Sara Seegar	76	US	Actress	Dead Men Tell No Tales; The Music Man
August	17	Pearl Bailey	72	US	Actress, Singer	Carmen Jones; The Fox and the Hound
August	23	Dorothea Kent	74	US	Actress	Pin Up Girl; She Married a Cop
August	27	Raymond St. Jacques	60	US	Actor	Cotton Comes to Harlem; The Green Berets
August	28	Edmund H. North	79	US	Screenwriter	The Day the Earth Stood Still; Patton
September	4	Irene Dunne	91	US	Actress	The Awful Truth; Cimarron
September	5	Jack Hildyard	82	UK	Cinematographer	The Bridge on the River Kwai; The Message
September	19	Werner Janssen	91	US	Composer	Blockade; The Southerner
September	19	Hermes Pan	80	US	Choreographer	My Fair Lady; Top Hat
September	20	Jackie Moran	67	US	Actor	The Adventures of Tom Sawyer; Nobody's Darling
October	4	Jill Bennett	58	UK	Actress	For Your Eyes Only; The Sheltering Sky
October	4	Roy Charman	60	UK	Sound Engineer	Aliens; Raiders of the Lost Ark
October	14	Leonard Bernstein	72	US	Composer	West Side Story; On the Waterfront
October	15	Delphine Seyrig	58	France	Actress, Director	Last Year at Marienbad; The Day of the Jackal
October	20	Joel McCrea	84	US	Actor	Sullivan's Travels; Foreign Correspondent
October	27	Jacques Demy	59	France	Director, Screenwriter, Composer	The Umbrellas of Cherbourg; The Young Girls of Rochefort
October	27	Ugo Tognazzi	68	Italy	Actor	La Cage aux Folles; The Conjugal Bed
November	2	William Travilla	70	US	Costume Designer	The Seven Year Itch; Adventures of Don Juan
November	3	Valerie French	62	UK	Actress	Jubal; Decision at Sundown
November	3	Mary Martin	76	US	Actress, Singer	Love Thy Neighbor; Night and Day
November	3	Walter H. Tyler	81	US	Art Director	Samson and Delilah; The Ten Commandments
November	4	Carol Sobieski	51	US	Screenwriter	Fried Green Tomatoes; Annie
November	10	Maura McGiveney	51	US	Actress	Twist Around the Clock; Do Not Disturb
November	11	Alexis Minotis	90	Greece	Actor	Land of the Pharaohs; Boy on a Dolphin
November	12	Eve Arden	82	US	Actress	Mildred Pierce; Anatomy of a Murder
November	13	Don Chaffey	73	New Zealand	Director	Jason and the Argonauts; Pete's Dragon
November	13	Maurice Richlin	70	US	Screenwriter	The Pink Panther; Pillow Talk
November	23	Roald Dahl	74	UK	Screenwriter	Willy Wonka & the Chocolate Factory; You Only Live Twice
November	27	David White	74	US	Actor	Sweet Smell of Success; The Apartment
December	1	Sergio Corbucci	63	Italy	Director, Screenwriter	Django; Navajo Joe
December	1	Carla Lehmann	73	Canada	Actress	Candlelight in Algeria; 29 Acacia Avenue
December	2	Robert Cummings	80	US	Actor	Dial M for Murder; Saboteur
December	4	Edward Binns	79	US	Actor	12 Angry Men; Fail-Safe
December	7	Joan Bennett	80	US	Actress	Father of the Bride; Scarlet Street
December	8	Martin Ritt	76	US	Director, Actor, Producer	Hud; The Spy Who Came in from the Cold
December	9	Mike Mazurki	82	US	Actor	Some Like It Hot; Dick Tracy
December	18	Anne Revere	87	US	Actress	National Velvet; Gentleman's Agreement
December	18	Connie Russell	67	US	Singer, Actress	Cruisin' Down the River; Nightmare
December	26	Gene Callahan	67	US	Production Designer	The Hustler; Steel Magnolias
December	28	Warren Skaaren	44	US	Screenwriter	Batman; Beetlejuice

== Film debuts ==
- Tadanobu Asano – Bataashi Kingyo
- Hank Azaria – Pretty Woman
- Patricia Belcher – Flatliners
- Abraham Benrubi – Diving In
- Julie Benz – Two Evil Eyes
- Brenda Blethyn – The Witches
- Andrew Bryniarski – Dragonfight
- Mark Camacho – Whispers
- Bill Camp – Reversal of Fortune
- Robert Carlyle – Silent Scream
- Chiara Caselli – The Secret
- Kyle Chandler – The Color of Evening
- Nick Chinlund – The Ambulance
- Scott Cohen – Jacob's Ladder
- Russell Crowe – Blood Oath
- Kieran Culkin – Home Alone
- James Badge Dale – Lord of the Flies
- Hope Davis – Flatliners
- Andy Dick – The Grifters
- Vin Diesel – Awakenings
- Ann Dowd – Green Card
- Denise Dowse – Coldfire
- Chris Ellis – Days of Thunder
- Kerry Fox – An Angel at My Table
- Brad Garrett – Jetsons: The Movie
- Balthazar Getty – Lord of the Flies
- Brendan Gleeson – The Field
- John Hannah – Harbour Beat
- Damon Herriman – The Big Steal
- Djimon Hounsou – Without You I'm Nothing
- Anthony Johnson – House Party
- Ashley Johnson – Lionheart
- Jacek Koman – Hunting
- Brian Krause – An American Summer
- Valérie Lemercier – May Fools
- Nia Long – Buried Alive
- George Lopez – Ski Patrol
- Aasif Mandvi – No Retreat, No Surrender 3: Blood Brothers
- Margo Martindale – Days of Thunder
- Debi Mazar – Goodfellas
- John McConnell – Miller's Crossing
- Neal McDonough – Darkman
- Rose McGowan – Class of 1999
- Don McManus – The Bonfire of the Vanities
- Rachel Miner – Alice
- Kristin Minter – Home Alone
- Julianne Moore – Tales from the Darkside: The Movie
- Peter Mullan – The Big Man
- Lochlyn Munro – Sylvan Lake Summer
- Guy Pearce – Heaven Tonight
- Wayne Péré – An American Summer
- Luke Perry – Terminal Bliss
- Christina Ricci – Mermaids
- Rob Schneider – Martians Go Home
- Nick Searcy – Days of Thunder
- June Squibb – Alice
- Joe Viterelli – State of Grace
- Isiah Whitlock Jr. – Gremlins 2: The New Batch
- Jeffrey Wright – Presumed Innocent
- Catherine Zeta-Jones – Les 1001 Nuits
