= Asquini =

Asquini is a surname. Notable people with the surname include:

- Fabio Asquini (1726–1818), Italian rural economist and agronomist
- Fabio Maria Asquini (1802–1878), Italian Roman Catholic Cardinal
- Giuseppe Asquini (1901–1987), Italian politician
- Joe Asquini (1925–1990), Canadian football player
