= Werwolf =

Nazi plan to create a resistance force operating behind enemy lines

Werwolf pennant with the Wolfsangel symbol in horizontal form

Werwolf (pronounced [ˈveːɐ̯vɔlf], German for 'werewolf') was a Nazi plan which began development in 1944, to create a resistance force which would operate behind enemy lines as the Allies advanced through Germany in parallel with the Wehrmacht fighting in front of the lines. There is some argument that the plan, and subsequent reports of guerrilla activities, were created by Joseph Goebbels through propaganda disseminated in the waning weeks of the war through his "Radio Werwolf," something that was not connected in any way with the military unit.

== Nomenclature ==
How and by whom the name was chosen is unknown. It is similar to the title of Hermann Löns' novel The Warwolf (German: Der Wehrwolf), first published in 1910, but there is nothing that confirms a direct inspiration. While Löns was not himself a Nazi (he died in 1914), his work became popular with the German far right, and some Nazis had promoted it.

In 1942, Adolf Hitler named the OKW and OKH field headquarters, at Vinnytsia in Ukraine, "Werwolf", and Hitler on a number of occasions had used "Wolf" as a pseudonym for himself. The etymology of the name "Adolf" itself carries connotations of noble (adal; Modern German Adel) wolf, while Hitler referred to his first World War II Eastern Front military headquarters as Wolfsschanze, commonly rendered in English as "Wolf's Lair" (literally 'Wolf's Sconce').

== Operations ==
Obergruppenführer Hans-Adolf Prützmann (right) meets with Reichsführer-SS Heinrich Himmler, during Himmler's visit of the 5th SS Panzer Division Wiking in Ukraine (September 1942).

In late summer to early autumn 1944, Heinrich Himmler initiated Unternehmen Werwolf (Operation Werwolf), ordering SS Obergruppenführer Hans-Adolf Prützmann to begin organizing an elite troop of volunteer forces to operate secretly behind enemy lines. As initially conceived, these Werwolf units were intended to be legitimate uniformed military or paramilitary formations trained to engage in clandestine operations behind enemy lines in the same manner as Allied Special Forces such as Commandos. They were never intended to act outside of the control of the German High Command (OKW), or to fight in civilian clothes, and they expected to be treated as soldiers if they were captured.

Prützmann was named Generalinspekteur für Spezialabwehr (General Inspector of Special Defence) and assigned the task of setting up the force's headquarters in Berlin and organising and instructing the force. Prützmann had studied the guerrilla tactics used by Soviet partisans while he was stationed in the occupied territories of Ukraine, and the idea was to teach these tactics to the members of Operation Werwolf.

According to German officers who were interrogated after the war, those who were familiar with Prützmann's central office said that it was, like its commanding officer, inefficient, weak, and uninspired, and that Prützmann himself was, in addition, "vain, idle and boastful." Walter Schellenberg, Heinrich Himmler's head of foreign intelligence, claimed to have told Himmler that the whole operation was "criminal and stupid."

=== Propaganda and Radio Werwolf ===
Rumors of a secret Nazi guerrilla organization began to surface soon after the Allied invasion of Normandy. Time ran an article containing speculation that the Germans would try to prolong the war indefinitely by going underground after their defeat.

The 27 January 1945 issue of Collier's Weekly featured a detailed article by Major Edwin Lessner, stating that elite SS and Hitler Youth were being trained to attack Allied forces and opening with a 1944 quote from Joseph Goebbels:

The enemy (invading German territory) will be taken in the rear by the fanatical population, which will ceaselessly worry him, tie down strong forces and allow him no rest or exploitation of any possible success.

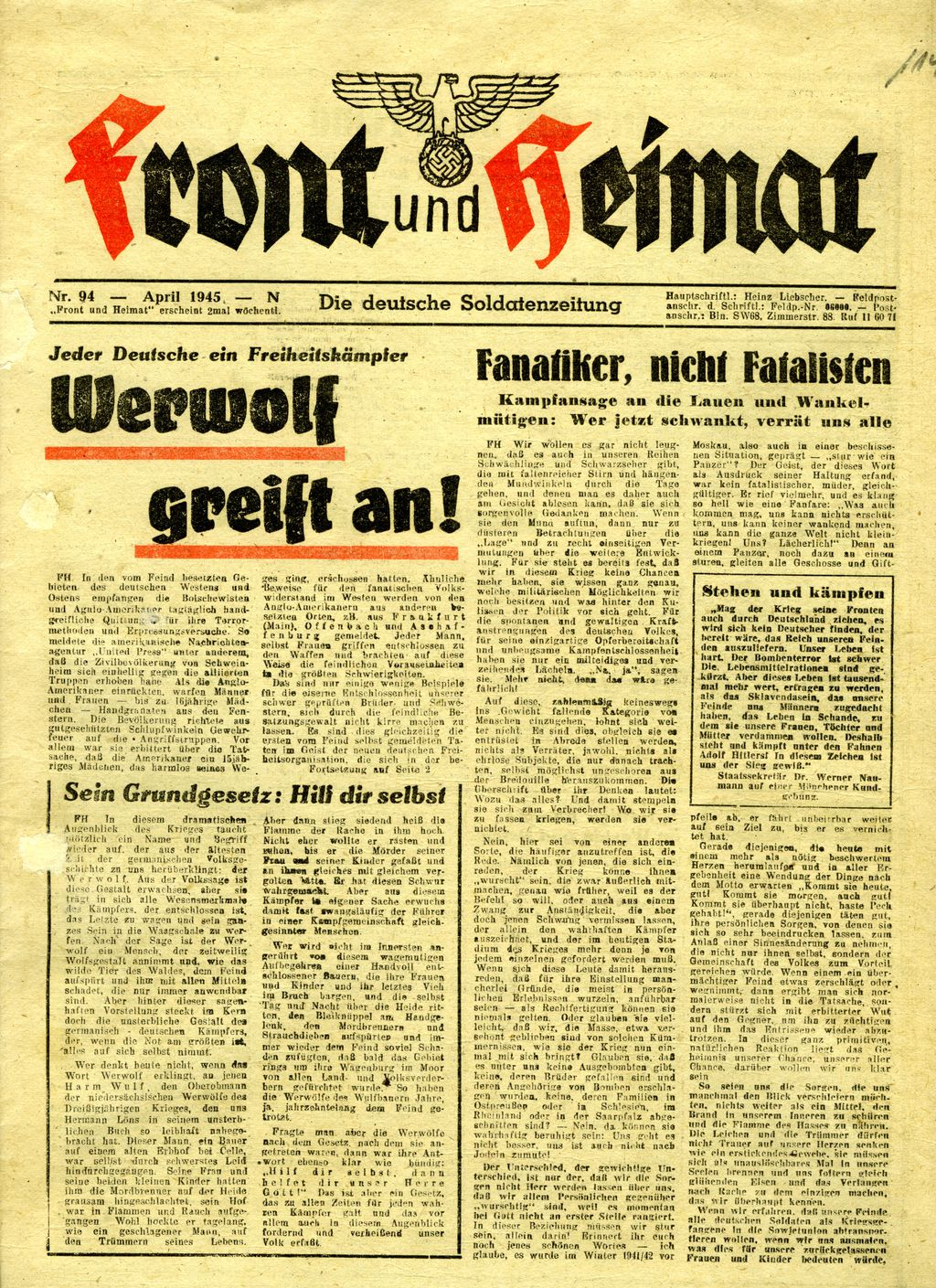
The front page of the April 1945 issue of Front und Heimat ("Front and Home: The German soldier's newspaper"), with the headline: "Werewolf is attacking!"

On 23 March 1945 Goebbels gave a speech known as the "Werwolf speech", in which he urged every German to fight to the death. The partial dismantling of the organised Werwolf, combined with the effects of the Werwolf speech, caused considerable confusion about which subsequent attacks were carried out by Werwolf members, as opposed to solo acts by fanatical Nazis or small groups of SS.

The Werwolf propaganda station "Radio Werwolf" broadcast from Nauen near Berlin, beginning on 1 April 1945. Broadcasts began with the sound of a wolf howling, and a song featuring the lyrics, "My werewolf teeth bite the enemy / And then he's done and then he's gone / Hoo, hoo hoo." The initial broadcast stated that the Nazi Party was ordering every German to "stand his ground and do or die against the Allied armies, who are preparing to enslave Germans." "Every Bolshevik, every Englishman, every American on our soil must be a target for our movement [...] Any German, whatever his profession or class, who puts himself at the service of the enemy and collaborates with him will feel the effect of our avenging hand [...] A single motto remains for us: 'Conquer or die.'"

Historian Hugh Trevor-Roper, writing not long after the end of the war, asserts that Radio Werwolf had no actual connection to the Werwolf military unit, and was instead organized and run by Propaganda Minister Joseph Goebbels, possibly in the hope of seizing control of the unit, which Goebbels deemed to be not radical enough. Trevor-Roper assesses Goebbels' Radio Werwolf as propagating "an ideological nihilism" which was not consonant with the limited aims of the actual unit. This disconnect between the broadcasts of Radio Werwolf and the purpose and actions of the military unit is, according to Trevor-Roper, the reason for popular misconceptions about the actual purpose of the unit, which was to attack the Allies from behind their lines, in parallel with the Germany Army fighting the Allies from the front, not to be a guerrilla-style resistance unit once Germany was defeated.

British and American newspapers widely reported the text of Radio Werwolf broadcasts, fueling rumors among occupation forces. Armed Forces Radio claimed:

Every friendly German civilian is a disguised soldier of hate. Armed with the inner conviction that the Germans are still superior [...] [they believe] that one day it will be their destiny to destroy you. Their hatred and their anger [...] are deeply buried in their blood. A smile is their weapon by which to disarm you [...] In heart, body and spirit every German is Hitler.

According to Belgian Resistance operatives, the Werwolf name held clout in the general population in Northern Austria. Using an alleged link with the group as cover they were able to reroute a train of "refugees" (Belgian and French Nazi collaborators running away from justice) from Innsbruck back to Switzerland and then Brussels.

=== Recruits ===
Gauleiters were to suggest suitable recruits, who would then be trained at secret locations in the Rhineland and Berlin. The chief training centre in the West was at Hülchrath Castle near Erkelenz, which by early 1945 was training around 200 recruits mostly drawn from the Hitler Youth.

Werwolf originally had about five thousand members recruited from the SS and the Hitler Youth. These recruits were specially trained in guerrilla tactics. Operation Werwolf went so far as to establish front companies to ensure continued fighting in those areas of Germany that were occupied (all of the "front companies" were discovered and shut down within eight months). However, as it became clear that the reputedly impregnable Alpine Fortress, from which operations were to be directed by the Nazi leadership if the rest of Germany was occupied, was yet another delusion, Werwolf was converted into a terrorist organisation in the last few weeks of the war.

=== Weaponry and tactics ===
Werwolf agents were supposed to have at their disposal a vast assortment of weapons, from fire-proof coats to silenced Walther pistols, but in reality, this was merely on paper; Werwolf never actually had the necessary equipment, organisation, morale or coordination. Given the dire supply situation German forces were facing in 1945, the commanding officers of existing Wehrmacht and SS units were unwilling to turn over what little equipment they still had for the sake of an organization whose actual strategic value was doubtful.

Attempts were made to bury explosives, ammunition and weapons around the country (mainly in the pre-1939 German–Polish border region) to be used by Werwolf in resistance fighting after the defeat of Germany, but not only were the quantities of material to be buried very low, by that point the movement itself was so disorganised that few actual members or leaders knew where the materials were. A large portion of these "depots" were found by the Soviets, and little of the material was actually used by Werwolf.

In the early months of 1945, SS Obersturmbannführer Otto Skorzeny was involved in training recruits for the Werwolfs, but he soon discovered that the number of Werwolf cells had been greatly exaggerated and that they would be ineffective as a fighting force. Knowing, like many other Nazi leaders, that the war was lost, he decided that the Werwolfs would instead be used as part of a Nazi "underground railroad," facilitating travel along escape routes called "ratlines" that allowed thousands of SS officers and other Nazis to flee Germany after the fall of the Third Reich.

=== Wartime capture of Werwolf personnel ===
On 28 April 1945, Staff Sergeant Ib Melchior of the US Counter-Intelligence Corps captured six German officers and 25 enlisted men dressed in civilian clothes, who claimed to constitute a Werwolf cell under the command of Colonel Paul Krüger, operating in Schönsee, Bavaria. The group was captured while hiding in a tunnel network which contained communications equipment, weapons, explosives and several months' food supplies. Two vehicles were hidden in the forest nearby. Documents discovered in the tunnels listed US military commanders as targets for assassination, including General Dwight D. Eisenhower. Krüger stated that in 1943 a school was created in Poland to train men in guerrilla warfare. On 16 September 1944, it was relocated to the town of Turkenberg. Krüger claimed that a total of 1,200 men completed Werwolf training in the school in less than two years. On 1 April 1945, the school was moved to Schönsee and a subterranean base was constructed. The students were instructed to "stay behind, evade capture, and then harass and destroy supply lines of United States troops [...] Special emphasis was put on gasoline and oil supplies." According to the G-2 report:

Operations were to begin three or four weeks after being overrun by US troops. The plan was for each unit to receive designated targets from the headquarters. Bands of from 10 to 20 men were then to be sent out to destroy the target and to return immediately to their unit. No targets were to be located nearer than fifteen kilometers (9.3 mi) to the unit. Secrecy and camouflage were relied upon for security and all personnel had strict orders to conceal themselves if US troops came into their area and under no circumstances to open fire in the bivouac area. No routes of escape had been planned. Members of the unit usually wore the Wehrmacht uniform, but a few members disguised themselves as foresters and were used as outposts to report any approaching danger. Their ordnance supplies consisted of mortars, machine guns, sub-machine guns, rifles, and various types of side arms. Each man was issued a Liliput pistol which could be very easily concealed on the person. The ammunition supply for each type weapon was ample for four months of ordinary operations. The unit had one civilian type sedan and one Wehrmacht motorcycle which were well hidden in the woods, and 120 horses which were dispersed on farms throughout the vicinity. Food consisting of canned meat, biscuits, crackers, chocolate, and canned vegetables was sufficient for over four months. Additional food supplies such as bread, potatoes, fresh vegetables, and smoked sausages were obtained from local sources. The unit was supplied with water by a brook passing through the area. Dugouts were constructed in such a manner as not to destroy the live trees around them. The dugouts were located on the slope of a hill which was densely covered with fir trees [...] The entrance to the dugout was a hole approximately 24 inches (61 cm) in diameter and four to five feet (1.2 to 1.5 m) deep. Approximately two feet (61 cm) down, this hole extended horizontally to a length of eight to ten feet (2.4 to 3.0 m). The dugout has a capacity of three men and has a wooden floor and a drainage ditch. Walls and roof are reinforced with lumber.

The following day a CIC unit led by Captain Oscar M. Grimes of the 97th Infantry Division captured about two hundred Gestapo officers and men in hiding near Hof, Bavaria. They were in possession of American army uniforms and equipment but had decided to surrender.

In May 1945 CIC Major John Schwartzwalder arrested members of a Werwolf cell in Bremen whose leader had fled. Schwartzwalder believed that the Werwolf never constituted a threat to Allied personnel:

[T]he Bremen group of the Jugend had received its orders to organize as a Werwolf cell only about four days before the fall of the city. By that time the Wehrmacht had taken all but the halt and the lame, and the Volkssturm had taken most of the rest. Nevertheless an organization had been started using the younger boys but it had not progressed to accumulating either weapons or supplies before the entry of the Allied troops...The only remaining fraction of the Werwolf that was of any importance was a residue of veterans of the last war who were physically ineligible for service in this one and who had weapons concealed here and there. These were not too hard to dispose of.

== Assessment by historians ==
Historians Antony Beevor and Earl F. Ziemke have argued that Werwolf never amounted to a serious threat, and furthermore propose that the plan barely existed. According to a study by former ambassador James Dobbins and a team of RAND Corporation researchers, there were no American combat casualties after the German surrender.

German historian Golo Mann, in his The History of Germany Since 1789 (1984) stated:

"The [Germans'] readiness to work with the victors, to carry out their orders, to accept their advice and their help was genuine; of the resistance which the Allies had expected in the way of 'werwolf' units and nocturnal guerrilla activities, there was no sign."

Historian Richard Bessel concurs that "'Werewolf' resistance to Allied occupation never really materialized," noting one exception in the form of the assassination of the American-installed mayor of Aachen, Franz Oppenhoff, on 28 March 1945, probably the most successful Werwolf operation. He highlights that the threat was nonetheless taken seriously by the Allies and that fear of the Werwolf among the Americans may have had hysterical characteristics, pointing to the "Intelligence Information Bulletins" issued by the American 6th Army Group which anticipated a guerrilla war and warned American soldiers of concealed explosives and hidden strongholds. Similarly, he observes that the NKVD appear to have believed that such an organization existed and posed a real threat to the Soviet occupation forces, with the Soviets using unfounded suspicions of Werwolf activity as a pretext to tighten police control and secure forced labor.

Perry Biddiscombe has offered a somewhat different view. In his books Werwolf!: The History of the National Socialist Guerrilla Movement, 1944–1946 (1998) and The Last Nazis: SS Werwolf Guerrilla Resistance in Europe, 1944–1947 (2000), Biddiscombe asserts that after retreating to the Black Forest and the Harz mountains, the Werwolf continued resisting the occupation until at least 1947, possibly until 1949–50. However, he characterizes German post-surrender resistance as "minor", and calls the post-war Werwolfs "desperadoes" and "fanatics living in forest huts". He further cites U.S. Army intelligence reports that characterized Nazi partisans as "nomad bands" and judged them as less serious threats than attacks by foreign slave laborers and considered their sabotage and subversive activities to be insignificant. He also notes that: "The Americans and British concluded, even in the summer of 1945, that, as a nationwide network, the original Werwolf was irrevocably destroyed, and that it no longer posed a threat to the occupation."

Biddiscombe also says that Werwolf violence failed to mobilize a spirit of popular national resistance, that the group was poorly led, poorly armed, and poorly organized, and that it was doomed to failure given the war-weariness of the populace and the hesitancy of young Germans to sacrifice themselves on the funeral pyre of the former Nazi regime. He concludes that the only significant achievement of the Werwolfs was to spark distrust of the German populace in the Allies as they occupied Germany, which caused them in some cases to act more repressively than they might have done otherwise, which in turn fostered resentments that helped to enable far right ideas to survive in Germany, at least in pockets, into the post-war era.

Nevertheless, says Biddiscombe, "The Werewolves were no bit players"; they caused tens of millions of dollars of property damage at a time when the European economies were in an already desperate state, and were responsible for the killing of thousands of people.

== Alleged Werwolf actions ==
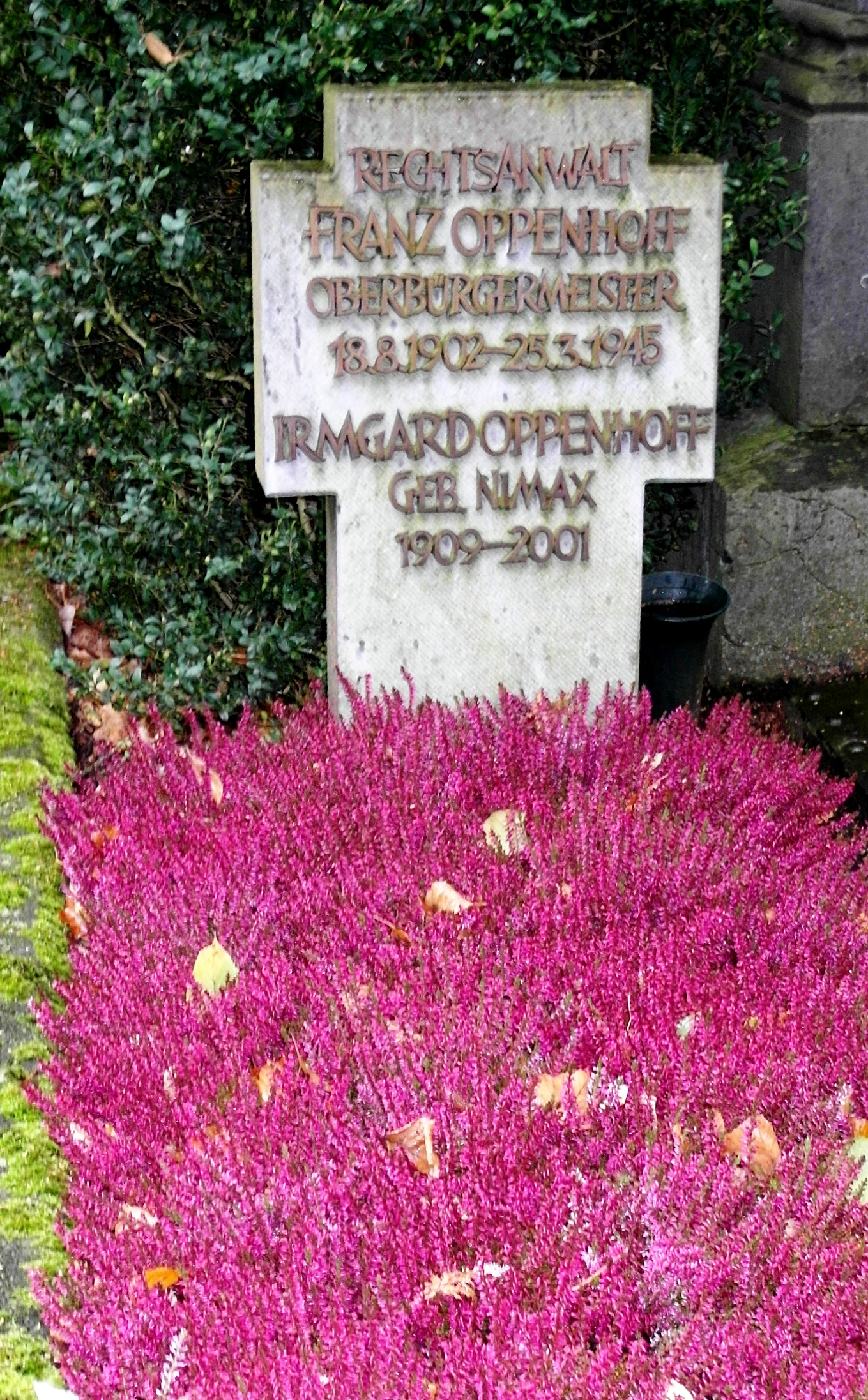
Franz Oppenhoff's grave in Aachen

A number of instances of resistance have been attributed to Werwolf activity:

- 25 March 1945 – Under the code name Unternehmen Karneval, Franz Oppenhoff, the newly appointed mayor of Aachen, was assassinated outside his home by an SS unit which was composed of Werwolf trainees from Hülchrath Castle, including Ilse Hirsch. They were flown in at the order of Heinrich Himmler.
- 28 March 1945 – The mayor of the eastern Ruhr town of Meschede was assassinated, even though Meschede was still behind German lines and was not overrun until mid-April. Radio Werwolf later announced that the assassination had been carried out by Werwolf agents.
- 30 March 1945 – Radio Werwolf claimed responsibility for the death of Major General Maurice Rose, commander of the US 3rd Armored Division, who was in reality killed in action by troops of the 507th Heavy Panzer Battalion.
- 14 April 1945 – Former social-democrat councillor and farmer Willi Rogge was shot and killed by a Werwolf unit near Dötlingen, in Lower Saxony, accused of stealing from a Reich Labour Service store.
- 21 April 1945 – Major John Poston, Field Marshal Bernard Montgomery's liaison officer, was ambushed and killed by unidentified assailants shortly before Germany's surrender; in reality Poston died in an ambush by regular troops.
- 22 April 1945 – Radio Werwolf claimed that a Werwolf unit composed of German citizens from Leuna and Merseburg had entered the Leuna synthetic petroleum factory and set off explosives, destroying four factory buildings and rendering it inoperable.
- 28 April 1945 – The Penzberg Murders: Werwolf operatives were allegedly responsible for the murder of the mayor of Penzberg, Bavaria, and fourteen others, because of their actions in freeing prisoners and preventing the destruction of property.
- 5 June 1945 – It has been claimed that the destruction of the United States Military Government police headquarters in Bremen by two explosions which resulted in 44 deaths was a Werwolf-related attack. There is, however, no proof that it was due to Werwolf actions rather than to unexploded bombs or delayed-action ordnance.
- 16 June 1945 – Colonel-General Nikolai Berzarin, Soviet Red Army commandant of East Berlin, is often claimed to have been assassinated by Werwolfs, but actually died in a motorcycle accident.
- 31 July 1945 – An ammunition dump in Ústí nad Labem (Aussig an der Elbe), a largely Sudeten German city in northern Bohemia exploded, killing 26 or 27 people and injuring dozens. The explosion was blamed on the Werwolf organization and resulted in the Ústí massacre of ethnic Germans.

== Allied reprisals ==
According to Biddiscombe "the threat of Nazi partisan warfare had a generally unhealthy effect on broad issues of policy among the occupying powers. As well, it prompted the development of draconian reprisal measures that resulted in the destruction of much German property and the deaths of thousands of civilians and soldiers". Fear of fanatics willing to die for Nazi ideology contributed to strict anti-fraternization rules for Allied forces. Ian Kershaw states that fear of Werwolf activities may have motivated atrocities against German civilians by Allied troops during and immediately after the war.

The German resistance movement was successfully suppressed in 1945. However, collective punishment for acts of resistance, such as fines and curfews, was still being imposed as late as 1948. Biddiscombe estimates the total death toll as a direct result of Werewolf actions and the resulting reprisals as 3,000–5,000.

=== Soviet reprisals ===
In the Soviet occupation zone, thousands of youths were arrested as "Werwolves". Evidently, arrests were arbitrary and in part based on denunciations. The arrested boys were either executed or interned in NKVD special camps. On 22 June 1945, Deputy Commissar of the NKVD Ivan Serov reported to the head of the NKVD Lavrentiy Beria the arrest of "more than 600" alleged Werwolf members, mostly aged 15 to 17 years.

The report, though referring to incidents where Soviet units came under fire from the woods, asserts that most of the arrested had not been involved in any action against the Soviets, which Serov explained with interrogation results allegedly showing that the boys had been "waiting" for the right moment and in the meantime focused on attracting new members. In October 1945, Beria reported to Joseph Stalin the "liquidation" of 359 alleged Werwolf groups. Of those, 92 groups with 1,192 members were "liquidated" in Saxony alone. On 5 August 1946, Soviet minister for internal affairs Sergei Nikiforovich Kruglov reported that in the Soviet occupation zone, 332 "terrorist diversion groups and underground organizations" had been disclosed and "liquidated". A total of about 10,000 youths were interned in NKVD special camps, half of whom did not return. Parents as well as the East German administration and political parties, installed by the Soviets, were denied any information on the whereabouts of the arrested youths. The Red Army's torching of Demmin, which resulted in the suicide of hundreds of people, was blamed on alleged preceding Werwolf activities by the East German regime.

=== American reprisals ===
Eisenhower believed he would be faced with extensive guerrilla warfare, based on the Alpine Redoubt. The fear of Werwolf activity believed to be mustering around Berchtesgaden in the Alps also led to the switch in U.S. operational targets in the middle of March 1945 away from the drive towards Berlin and instead shifted the thrust towards the south and on linking up with the Russians first. An intelligence report stated "We should ... be prepared to undertake operations in Southern Germany in order to overcome rapidly any organised resistance by the German Armed Forces or by guerrilla movements which may have retreated to the inner zone and to this redoubt". On 31 March Eisenhower told Roosevelt, "I am hopeful of launching operations that should partially prevent a guerrilla control of any large area such as the southern mountain bastions".

Eisenhower had previously also requested that the occupation directive JCS 1067 not make him responsible for maintaining living conditions in Germany under the expected circumstances; "... probably guerrilla fighting and possibly even civil war in certain districts ... If conditions in Germany turn out as described, it will be utterly impossible effectively to control or save the economic structure of the country ... and we feel we should not assume the responsibility for its support and control." The British were "mortified by such a suggestion", but the War Department took considerable account of Eisenhower's wishes. In addition, civilians held by the U.S. climbed from 1,000 in late March to 30,000 in late June, and more than 100,000 by the end of 1945. Conditions were often poor in the camps for civilians.

=== British reprisals ===
In April 1945 Churchill announced that the Allies would incarcerate all captured German officers for as long as a guerrilla threat existed. Hundreds of thousands of German last-ditch troops were kept in the makeshift Rheinwiesenlager for months, "mainly to prevent Werwolf activity".

Prior to the occupation SHAEF investigated the reprisal techniques the Germans had used in order to maintain control over occupied territories since they felt the Germans had had good success. Directives were loosely defined and implementation of reprisal was largely left to the preferences of the various armies, with the British seeming uncomfortable with those involving bloodshed. Rear-Admiral H.T. Baillie Grohman for example stated that killing hostages was "not in accordance with our usual methods". Thanks to feelings such as this, and relative light guerrilla activity in their area, relatively few reprisals took place in the UK zone of operations.

== Similar organizations ==
=== In Germany ===
From 1946 onward, Allied intelligence officials noted resistance activities by an organisation which had appropriated the name of the anti-Nazi resistance group, the Edelweiss Piraten (Edelweiss Pirates). The group was reported to be composed mainly of former members and officers of Hitler Youth units, ex-soldiers and drifters, and was described by an intelligence report as "a sentimental, adventurous, and romantically anti-social [movement]". It was regarded as a more serious menace to order than the Werwolf by US officials.

A raid in March 1946 captured 80 former German officers who were members, and who possessed a list of 400 persons to be liquidated, including Wilhelm Hoegner, the prime minister of Bavaria. Further members of the group were seized with caches of ammunition and even anti-tank rockets. In late 1946 reports of activities gradually died away.

=== In Denmark ===
In 2015, Danish police uncovered files in their archives outlining the Danish part of Operation Werwolf under the command of Horst Paul Issel. Issel was arrested in Germany in 1949 and handed over to Denmark. A total of 130 stashes of weapons and explosives were placed around Denmark and personnel were inserted into strategically important parts of society.

=== In Yugoslavia ===
The remains of some military organizations which collaborated with Axis forces continued with raid activities like Crusaders (guerrilla) (until 1950), Balli Kombëtar (until 1950).

=== Comparison to Second Iraq War ===
The Iraqi insurgency was initially compared to the history of Werwolf by the Bush Administration and other Iraq War supporters. In speeches given on 25 August 2003 to the Veterans of Foreign Wars by National Security Advisor Condoleezza Rice and Secretary of Defense Donald Rumsfeld parallels were drawn between the resistance faced by the Multi-National Force – Iraq's occupation forces in Iraq to that encountered by occupation forces in post-World War II Germany, asserting that the Iraqi insurgency would ultimately prove to be as futile in realizing its objectives as had the Werwolfs.

Former Clinton-era National Security Council staffer Daniel Benjamin published a riposte in Slate magazine on 29 August 2003, entitled "Condi's Phony History: Sorry, Dr. Rice, postwar Germany was nothing like Iraq" in which he took Rice and Rumsfeld to task for mentioning Werwolf, writing that the reality of postwar Germany bore no resemblance to the occupation of Iraq, and made reference to Antony Beevor's Berlin: The Downfall 1945 and the US Army's official history, The U.S. Army in the Occupation of Germany 1944–1946, where the Werwolf were only mentioned twice in passing. This did not prevent his political opponents from disagreeing with him, using Biddiscombe's book as a source.

== In popular culture ==
- The 1955 James Bond novel Moonraker portrays the primary antagonist Hugo Drax as a former Werwolf commando who disguised himself as a British industrialist after the war and used his identity to build a nuclear missile to launch at London.
- The novel The Odessa File features a network within the titular organization that is designed after the Werwolf unit: their leader even uses the "Werwolf" title as his codename and is revealed to have been an actual Werwolf during the war.
- The 2001 film The Substitute: Failure Is Not an Option by Robert Radler. The movie depicts a white supremacist colonel at a military academy, who trains a group of young soldiers to carry out terrorist attacks on American soil.
- The 2008 alternate history novel The Man with the Iron Heart by American author Harry Turtledove depicts a longer-lived Reinhard Heydrich organising a "German Freedom Front", also called Werewolves, in an attempt to drive the Allied occupiers out of Germany.
- The 2015 alternate history novel Germanica by Robert Conroy sees Goebbels bring his hypothetical resistance force to fruition. In one scene, an Allied character discovers that the insurgents use a particularly frightening werewolf as an insignia.
- Lars von Trier uses the Werwolf theme as backdrop in his 1991 movie Europa.
- The Golden Age horror comic Adventures into the Unknown #14, released in December 1951, includes the story "The Werewolf Strikes", by Charles Spain Verral. In this story, American occupation forces are tasked with protecting pro-democracy German figures from assassination by Werwolf agents, allegedly co-ordinated by a surviving Schutzstaffel officer. The presence of Werwolf activities creates fear and uncooperativeness among the occupied German population. The leading Werwolf assassin is revealed to be an actual werewolf, and she is slain with a silver knife.

== See also ==
- Anti-Soviet partisans
- Alpine Fortress
- Auxiliary Units
- Battle of Baghuz Fawqani
- HIAG
- Japanese holdout
- Nero Decree
- Operation Gladio
- Operation Unthinkable
- Ratlines
  - Operation Paperclip
  - Stille Hilfe
  - ODESSA
