= Ian Syme =

Scottish first-class cricketer (1929–2018)

Personal information
- Full name: Ian Alexander Hastie Syme
- Born: 29 December 1929; Stirling, Stirlingshire, Scotland
- Died: 26 December 2018 (aged 88); Dundee, Angus, Scotland
- Batting: Right-handed
- Bowling: Right-arm fast-medium

Domestic team information
- Years: Team
- 1950: Scotland

Career statistics
Competition	First-class
Matches	1
Runs scored	12
Batting average	6.00
100s/50s	–/–
Top score	12
Balls bowled	12
Wickets	0
Bowling average	–
5 wickets in innings	–
10 wickets in match	–
Best bowling	–
Catches/stumpings	–/–
- Source: Cricinfo, 3 November 2022

Ian Alexander Hastie Syme (29 December 1929 – 26 December 2018) was a Scottish first-class cricketer.

Syme was born at Stirling in December 1929. He was educated at the Edinburgh Academy, before matriculating to the University of Glasgow where he studied agriculture. A club cricketer for Stirling County, he made a single appearance in first-class cricket for Scotland against Ireland at Perth in 1950. Batting twice in the match, he was dismissed for 0 by James Boucher, one of five ducks in Scotland's first innings total of 58 all out, while in their second innings he was dismissed for 12 runs by John Hill. With his right-arm fast-medium bowling, he bowled two wicketless overs in the Irish first innings. Syme carried out his National Service as a second lieutenant in the Royal Electrical and Mechanical Engineers in 1956. He gained promotion to lieutenant in February 1958, after the completion of his National Service he remained on the Army Reserve of Officers. Following his National Service, he initially worked in the agricultural industry, before becoming an executive in the oil and gas industry. Syme died at Ninewells Hospital in Dundee in December 2018, three days short of his 89th birthday.
