= Deaths in November 1990 =

The following is a list of notable deaths in November 1990.

Entries for each day are listed alphabetically by surname. A typical entry lists information in the following sequence:

- Name, age, country of citizenship at birth, subsequent country of citizenship (if applicable), reason for notability, cause of death (if known), and reference.

== November 1990 ==
=== 1 ===
- Richard Desmond, 63, American Olympic ice hockey player (1952).
- Ward Haylett, 95, American track and field coach.
- Kim Hyun-sik, 32, South Korean musician, cirrhosis.
- Cyprien Biyehima Kihangire, 72, Ugandan Roman Catholic prelate.
- Ray Pohlman, 60, American guitarist, heart failure.
- G. Malcolm Trout, 94, American dairy scientist.
- Eszter Voit, 74, Hungarian Olympic gymnast (1936).

=== 2 ===
- Frederick Thomas Armstrong, 82, Canadian politician, member of the House of Commons of Canada (1963–1965).
- Abasaheb Garware, 86, Indian industrialist.
- Peter Hellings, 74, English marine.
- Robert T. McLoskey, 83, American politician, member of the U.S. House of Representatives (1963–1965).
- Eliot Porter, 88, American photographer.
- William Travilla, 70, American costume designer, lung cancer.
- Donald Allen Wollheim, 76, American science fiction author.

=== 3 ===
- Kenan Erim, 61, Turkish archaeologist.
- Valerie French, 62, English actress, leukemia.
- George Gale, 63, British journalist.
- Manmohan Krishna, 68, Indian actor and film director.
- Mary Martin, 76, American actress and singer, cancer.
- Sashadhar Mukherjee, 81, Indian filmmaker.
- Bruno Ochman, 61, Canadian Olympic wrestler (1956).
- Nikolai Rakov, 82, Soviet violinist.
- Jack Russell, 85, American baseball player.
- Walter H. Tyler, 81, American art director.

=== 4 ===
- Mildred Allen, 96, American physicist.
- Henry Cravatte, 79, Luxembourgish politician.
- James C. Harrison, 64, American artist.
- Cyrus Levinthal, 68, American molecular biologist, lung cancer.
- Hicks Lokey, 86, American animator.
- Carol Sobieski, 51, American screenwriter, amyloidosis.
- David Stirling, 74, Scottish soldier.
- Shigeo Takahashi, 78, Japanese Olympic athlete (1932, 1936).

=== 5 ===
- Herbert Berghof, 81, Austrian-American actor and film director.
- Øivind Breiby, 72, Norwegian Olympic boxer (1948).
- Humphrey Gibbs, 87, Zimbabwean colonial administrator.
- Erich Heller, 79, British essayist.
- Meir Kahane, 58, American-Israeli politician, shot.
- Shunkichi Kikuchi, 74, Japanese photographer, leukemia.
- Raymond Oliver, 81, French chef, cancer.
- Bobby Scott, 53, American musician, lung cancer.
- Kevyn Webb, 66, Australian Olympic rower (1960).
- Suleiman Yudakov, 74, Soviet and Tajikistani musician.

=== 6 ===
- Bob Armstrong, 59, Canadian ice hockey player (Boston Bruins).
- Lex Franken, 74, Dutch Olympic water polo player (1936).
- Ed Gossett, 88, American politician, member of the U.S. House of Representatives (1939–1951).
- Hilary Baumann Hacker, 77, American Roman Catholic prelate.
- Thomas Hiley, 84, Australian politician.
- Kálmán Kirchmayer, 92, Hungarian Olympic tennis player (1924).
- Will Kuluva, 73, American actor.
- Marcel Légaut, 90, French theologian and mathematician.
- Rodrigo Moynihan, 80, English painter.
- George Philip Ochola, 60, Kenyan trade unionist and politician.
- Piet van der Sluijs, 72, Dutch footballer.

=== 7 ===
- Ack Ack, 24, American Thoroughbred racehorse.
- Lemuel Ricketts Boulware, 95, American businessman.
- Tom Clancy, 66, Irish singer (The Clancy Brothers) and actor, stomach cancer.
- Lawrence Durrell, 78, British novelist, stroke.
- John G. Fuller, 76, American writer, lung cancer.
- Sigurd Monssen, 88, Norwegian Olympic rower (1948).
- Stepan Privedentsev, 74, Soviet Russian painter, a member of the Leningrad Union of Artists.
- Vito Russo, 44, American LGBT activist, AIDS.
- Elmo Veron, 87, American film and television editor.
- Josephine Wilson, 86, British actress.

=== 8 ===
- Nils Reinhardt Christensen, 71, Norwegian filmmaker.
- Jacqueline Pirenne, 71-72, French archaeologist, traffic collision.
- Wolfgang Schmieder, 89, German musicologist.
- Anya Seton, 86, American author.
- Earl Torgeson, 66, American baseball player, leukemia.

=== 9 ===
- Alfredo Armas Alfonzo, 69, Venezuelan writer, critic, editor and historian.
- Olton van Genderen, 69, Surinamese politician.
- Piet Groeneveld, 66, Dutch footballer.
- Hugh MacLennan, 83, Canadian novelist.
- Harold A. Stevens, 83, American judge.
- Dora Söderberg, 90, Swedish actress.

=== 10 ===
- Willy Dasso, 73, Peruvian Olympic basketball player (1936).
- Ronnie Dyson, 40, American singer and actor, heart failure.
- Louis Guy LeBlanc, 69, Canadian politician, member of the House of Commons of Canada (1965–1972).
- Maura McGiveney, 51, English-American actress, cirrhosis.
- Aurelio Monteagudo, 46, Cuban baseball player, traffic collision.
- Bhalchandra Nilkanth Purandare, 79, Indian gynaecologist.
- Tommy Sale, 80, English footballer.
- Mário Schenberg, 76, Brazilian physicist and writer.
- Çetin Zeybek, 58, Turkish football player.

=== 11 ===
- Ted Albert, 53, Australian record producer, heart attack.
- Greg Buckingham, 45, American Olympic swimmer (1968), heart attack.
- Attilio Demaría, 81, Argentine footballer.
- Margarete Heymann, 91, German ceramicist.
- Sadi Irmak, 86, Turkish politician, prime minister (1974–1975).
- Lisa Kirk, 65, American singer and actress, lung cancer.
- Alexis Minotis, 90, Greek actor and film director.
- Yannis Ritsos, 81, Greek poet.
- William Randolph Taylor, 94, American botanist.
- John M. Zwach, 83, American politician, member of the U.S. House of Representatives (1967–1975).

=== 12 ===
- Eve Arden, 82, American actress (Mildred Pierce, Our Miss Brooks, Grease), Emmy winner (1954), cardiac arrest, heart attack.
- Balcomb Greene, 86, American artist and teacher.
- Tetsumi Kudo, 55, Japanese Japanese painter, sculptor, and performance artist, cancer.
- Randi Heide Steen, 80, Norwegian singer.
- Junior Walsh, 71, American baseball player (Pittsburgh Pirates).
- Dave Willock, 81, American actor, stroke.

=== 13 ===
- Hanus Burger, 81, Czech-American screenwriter.
- Don Chaffey, 73, British film director (Jason and the Argonauts, Pete's Dragon, One Million Years B.C.), heart attack.
- James Cockburn, 74, Australian rules footballer.
- Helen Dettweiler, 75, American golfer, cancer.
- Wilfred Dunderdale, 90, British spy, possible inspiration for James Bond.
- Frederick Rowland Emett, 84, English kinetic sculptor.
- Joseph Lang, 79, American Olympic boxer (1932).
- Richard Lewis, 76, English singer.
- Bobby Marcano, 39, Venezuelan baseball player.
- Maurice Richlin, 70, American screenwriter.
- Lester Williams, 70, American guitarist.

=== 14 ===
- Margot Arce de Vázquez, 86, Puerto Rican writer, Alzheimer's disease.
- Horst Feistel, 75, German-American cryptographer.
- Paula Nenette Pepin, 82, French musician, heart attack.
- Sol Kaplan, 71, American composer, lung cancer.
- Otto Kuchenbecker, 83, German Olympic basketball player (1936).
- Malcolm Muggeridge, 87, English journalist and satirist.
- Adolf Rudnicki, 78, Polish author and essayist.
- Leonid Trauberg, 88, Soviet and Ukrainian film director and screenwriter.

=== 15 ===
- Alydar, 15, American thoroughbred racehorse, euthanized.
- Jill Day, 59, English singer, cancer.
- Oswald Denison, 85, New Zealand rower.
- Ettore Giannini, 77, Italian filmmaker.
- Gideon Hausner, 75, Israeli politician.
- Irving Janis, 72, American psychologist, lung cancer.
- Princess Irina Pavlovna Paley, 86, French exiled Russian royal.
- Jimmy Ward, 84, Canadian ice hockey player (Montreal Maroons, Montreal Canadiens).

=== 16 ===
- Pierre Braunberger, 85, French film producer.
- Lee Castle, 75, American musician.
- Yang Lien-sheng, 76, Chinese-American sinologist.
- Northern Dancer, 29, Canadian Thoroughbred racehorse and sire.
- Dmitri Skobeltsyn, 97, Soviet physicist.

=== 17 ===
- Otto Demus, 88, Austrian art historian and Byzantinist.
- Robert Hofstadter, 75, American physicist, Nobel Prize recipient (1961).
- Edna Hughes, 74, English Olympic swimmer (1932, 1936).
- Herbert B. Maw, 97, American politician, governor of Utah (1941–1949).

=== 18 ===
- Murray Ashby, 59, New Zealand rower.
- Wolfgang Büttner, 78, German actor and voice actor.
- Fred Daly, 79, Northern Irish golfer, heart attack.
- Harwell Hamilton Harris, 87, American architect.
- László Hódi, 78, Hungarian Olympic diver (1936).
- David Lloyd Kreeger, 81, American art philanthropist.
- Beatrice Shilling, 81, British aeronautical engineer.

=== 19 ===
- Šefik Bešlagić, 82, Yugoslav cultural historian.
- John Fitzpatrick, 86, American baseball player and coach.
- Georgy Flyorov, 77, Soviet nuclear physicist, namesake of flerovium.
- Phillip M. Landrum, 83, American politician, member of the U.S. House of Representatives (1953–1977).
- Sun Li-jen, 89, Taiwanese general.
- Lennart Ljung, 69, Swedish general.
- Jean-Jacques Maurer, 59, Swiss footballer.
- Joseph C. Satterthwaite, 90, American diplomat.

=== 20 ===
- Guglielmo Achille Cavellini, 76, Italian artist.
- William Montague Cobb, 86, American physician and a physical anthropologist.
- Herbert Kegel, 70, German conductor, suicide.
- Bengt Odhner, 72, Swedish diplomat.

=== 21 ===
- Vernon Ellis Cosslett, 82, British microscopist.
- Léopold Demers, 78, Canadian politician, member of the House of Commons of Canada (1948–1958).
- Dean Hart, 36, Canadian-American professional wrestler, heart attack.
- Pierre Musy, 80, Swiss Olympic bobsledder and equestrian (1936, 1948.
- Eugene Rosenberg, 83, Czechoslovak architect.
- Ralph Siewert, 66, American basketball player.

=== 22 ===
- Joe Bowman, 80, American baseball player.
- Gustav Fischer, 75, Swiss equestrian and Olympic medalist (1952, 1956, 1960, 1964, 1968).
- Jack Petersen, 79, Welsh boxer, lung cancer.
- Benjamin H. Vandervoort, 73, United States Army officer.
- Eberhard Zwicker, 66, German acoustics scientist.

=== 23 ===
- Roald Dahl, 74, British author (Charlie and the Chocolate Factory, James and the Giant Peach, Matilda), myelodysplastic syndrome.
- Bo Díaz, 37, Venezuelan baseball player (Cleveland Indians, Philadelphia Phillies, Cincinnati Reds), domestic accident.
- Karl Aage Hansen, 69, Danish footballer and Olympian (1948).
- Caio Prado Júnior, 83, Brazilian historian.
- Sergio Matto, 60, Uruguayan Olympic basketball player (1952, 1956).
- Rock Pidjot, 83, New Caledonian politician.
- Renate Rubinstein, 61, German-Dutch writer.
- Nguyen Van Tam, 95, Vietnamese politician, prime minister (1952–1953).

=== 24 ===
- Richard Acland, 83, English politician.
- Bülent Arel, 71, Turkish composer, multiple myeloma.
- Juan Manuel Bordeu, 56, Argentine racing driver.
- Vincenzo Demetz, 79, Italian Olympic cross-country skier (1936).
- Helga Feddersen, 60, German actress, cancer.
- Michel Giacometti, 61, French musicologist.
- Wayne Hillman, 52, Canadian ice hockey player, cancer.
- Ronald Hopkins, 93, Australian general.
- Joseph Jadrejak, 72, French football player and manager.
- Arnold Marquis, 69, German actor, lung cancer.
- Keiji Nishitani, 90, Japanese academic.
- Fred Shero, 65, Canadian ice hockey player and coach, stomach cancer.
- Dodie Smith, 94, English novelist (The Hundred and One Dalmatians, I Capture the Castle).
- Robb White, 81, American screenwriter.
- Marion Post Wolcott, 80, American photographer, lung cancer.

=== 25 ===
- Gerry Archibald, 83, Canadian basketball player and coach.
- Guillermo Cornejo, 71, Peruvian Olympic sports shooter (1956, 1960, 1964).
- Ernest Duncan, 74, New-Zealand-Australian-American mathematician, leukemia.
- Harlan Hagen, 76, American politician, member of the U.S. House of Representatives (1953–1967).
- Merab Mamardashvili, 60, Soviet philosopher.
- Mikko Niskanen, 61, Finnish filmmaker, cancer.
- Salvatore Todisco, 29, Italian Olympic boxer (1984), traffic collision.
- Billy Vukovich III, 27, American racing driver, racing collision.
- Bettina Warburg, 90, German-born American psychiatrist.

=== 26 ===
- Frank Brisko, 90, American racing driver.
- Antonín Kalina, 88, Czechoslovak humanitarian.
- Savitri Khanolkar, 77, Swiss-Indian designer (Param Vir Chakra).
- Samuel Noah Kramer, 93, Russian-American Assyriologist, throat cancer.
- Heikki Partanen, 48, Finnish filmmaker, suicide.
- Edward Pearce, Baron Pearce, 89, British judge.
- Ludwig von Moos, 80, Swiss politician.
- Jacques Wild, 85, French Olympic footballer (1928).
- Dave Wilkins, 76, Barbadian trumpeter.
- Feng Youlan, 94, Chinese philosopher.

=== 27 ===
- Proinsias Mac an Bheatha, 80, Irish writer.
- Joseph T. Edgar, 80, American politician.
- Juan Gindre, 75, Argentine Olympic sports shooter (1956, 1960).
- Murrell Hogue, 86, American football player (Chicago Cardinals).
- Avro Manhattan, 76, Italian writer.
- Paddy Sheriff, 64, Irish basketball player and Olympian (1948).
- Ernst Oswald Johannes Westphal, 71, South African linguist.
- David White, 74, American actor, heart attack.

=== 28 ===
- Richard Bachtell, 84, American Olympic weightlifter (1932).
- Birger Bohlin, 92, Swedish palaeontologist.
- Ted Catlin, 80, English footballer.
- Tamara De Treaux, 31, American actress, respiratory failure.
- Božena Dobešová, 76, Czechoslovak Olympic gymnast (1936).
- Paco Godia, 69, Spanish racing driver.
- Douglas Green, 88, Australian cricketer.
- Tommy Hughes, 71, American baseball player (Philadelphia Phillies, Cincinnati Reds).
- Garcia Massingale, 62, American baseball player.
- Władysław Rubin, 73, Polish Roman Catholic cardinal, Alzheimer's disease.

=== 29 ===
- Raymond Bourgine, 65, French politician.
- Harry M. Caudill, 68, American author, suicide by gunshot.
- Malcolm Dole, 87, American chemist.
- Günter Platzek, 60, German keyboardist, heart attack.
- Marcel Sedille-Courbon, 85, Belgian Olympic bobsledder (1928).
- Lou Sleeth, 74, Australian rules footballer.
- József Szalai, 97, Hungarian Olympic gymnast (1912, 1928).
- Geneviève Vankiersbilck, 86, French Olympic gymnast (1928).

=== 30 ===
- Fritz Barzilauskas, 70, American football player (Boston Yanks, New York Giants).
- Richard Brown, 83, American football player (Portsmouth Spartans).
- Norman Cousins, 75, American political journalist, heart failure.
- Vladimir Dedijer, 76, Yugoslav diplomat and historian.
- Fritz Eichenberg, 89, German-American artist, Parkinson's disease.
- Ivan Medarić, 78, Yugoslav footballer.
- T. R. Ramachandran, 73, Indian actor and comedian.
- Hilde Spiel, 79, Austrian writer and journalist.
