= Franz Oppenhoff =

German lawyer and politician (1902–1945)

Mayor of Aachen
- In office 31 October 1944 – 25 March 1945
- Preceded by: Office established
- Succeeded by: Office abolished

Personal details
- Born: 18 August 1902 Aachen, Germany
- Died: 25 March 1945 (aged 42) Aachen, Germany
- Cause of death: Assassination (gunshot wound)
- Spouse: Irmgard Oppenhoff
- Children: 3
- Education: University of Cologne
- Occupation: Lawyer

Franz Oppenhoff (18 August 1902 – 25 March 1945) was a German lawyer who was appointed mayor of the city of Aachen after its capture by Allied forces in World War II. He was subsequently assassinated on the order of Heinrich Himmler.

== Biography ==
Born in 1902, Franz Oppenhoff received a law degree from Cologne University, and worked as a lawyer until World War II. Oppenhoff was an expert on Nazi law, had been legal representative for the Bishop of Aachen, Johannes Joseph van der Velden, and had defended some cases for Jewish companies. Knowing that the Gestapo was interested in him, he had taken refuge in Eupen, across the border in Belgium, in September 1944, taking his wife and three daughters with him.

Following the occupation of Aachen after the Battle of Aachen, in October 1944, Allied officials wanted to appoint a non-Nazi to take over administration of the city. Assisted by the Bishop of Aachen, officials managed to make contact with a group of local business people, one of whom was willing to become the first German mayor under American rule. This was Franz Oppenhoff, who was then 42 years old.

When Oppenhoff was sworn into office on 31 October 1944 no press photos were permitted and his name was not divulged, the reason being that he still had relatives in Nazi Germany who might be liable to reprisals from the Nazi regime. Also, earlier in October the SS newspaper, Das Schwarze Korps, had written that there would be no German administration under the occupation because any official who collaborated with the enemy could count on being dead within a month.

Oppenhoff and his choices for officials dismayed the Americans. They had expected any anti-Nazi to be a democrat, but Oppenhoff was both anti-Nazi and a Bismarckian autocrat. The Bishop had recommended him, and clergical recommendation had at first been very influential, but the Catholic church was more neutral than anti-Nazi. Civilians saw him as someone who had avoided military service and was now part of a new post-Nazi elite. Oppenhoff became indispensable to the occupiers because of the lack of competent alternatives, but they sought to avoid recreating an Aachen-like clique elsewhere.

In December 1944 a group of officers belonging to the US Army's Psychological Warfare Division, coordinated by historian Saul K. Padover, arrived in Aachen to assess the German population's political views and their attitude to the Nazis and the local situation. In January 1945 Padover claimed that he had discovered a "wholesale political conspiracy" in the city, centering on Oppenhoff, whose purpose was to keep left-wing forces out of stewardship. Padover reported to his superiors that the Aachen city administration "...is shrewd, strongwilled, and aggressive... Its leader is Oberbürgermeister Oppenhoff...behind Oppenhoff is the bishop of Aachen, a powerful figure with a subtlety of his own... All of these men managed to stay out of the Nazi party, most of them were directly connected with the town's leading war industries, [Veltrup and Talbot ]...These men are not democratically minded... They are planning the future in terms of an authoritarian highly bureaucratic state...Politically it is conceived as small-state Clericalism...". To make matters "worse", Oppenhoff and his associates had displayed what was seen as leniency in accepting ex-Nazis for jobs in the city administration.

Padover saw to it that his story was leaked to the press so as to create sufficient uproar in the American public, and a purge of the city administration resulted, to expel former Nazis.

== Operation Carnival ==
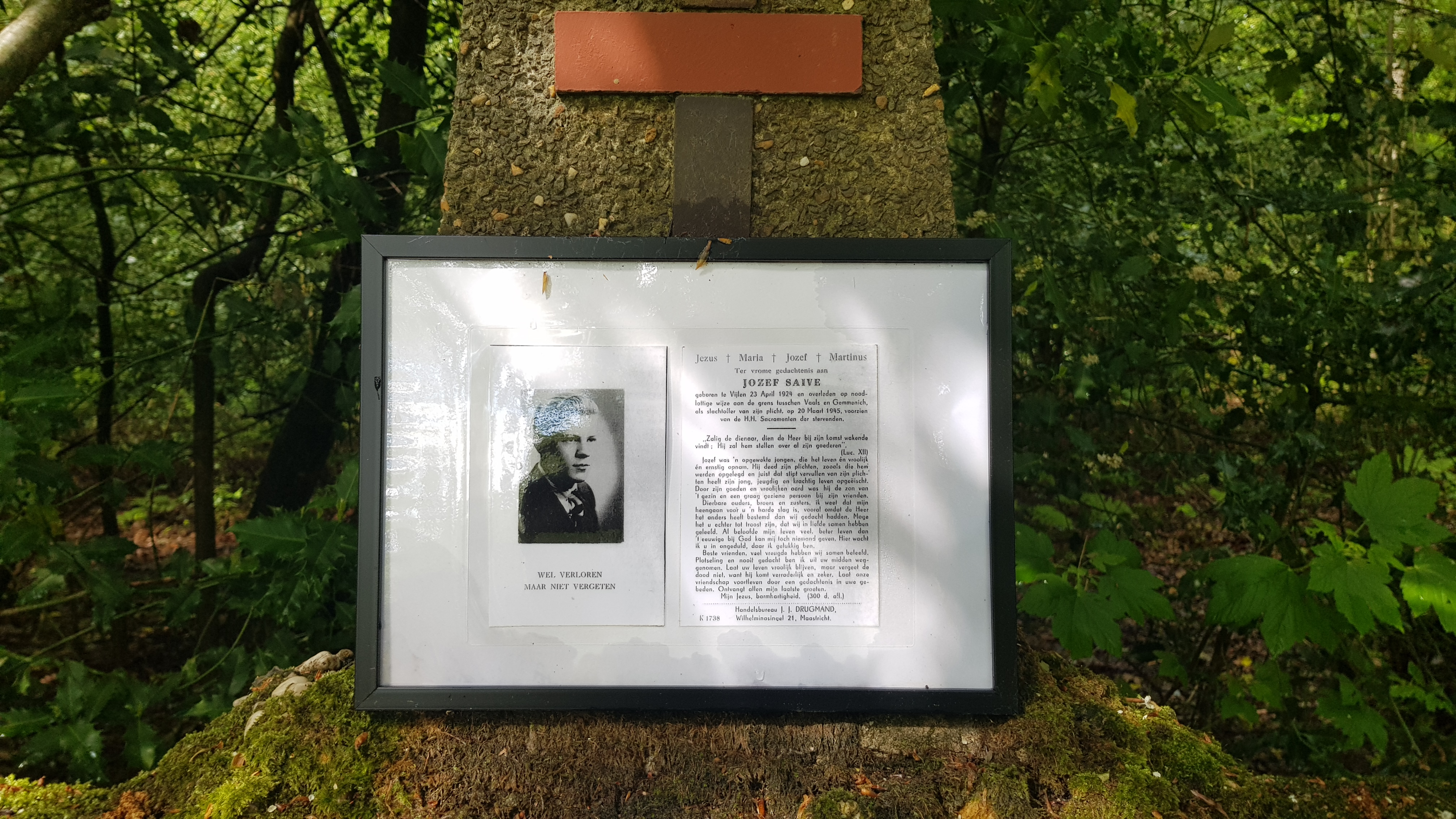
Jozef Saive memorial

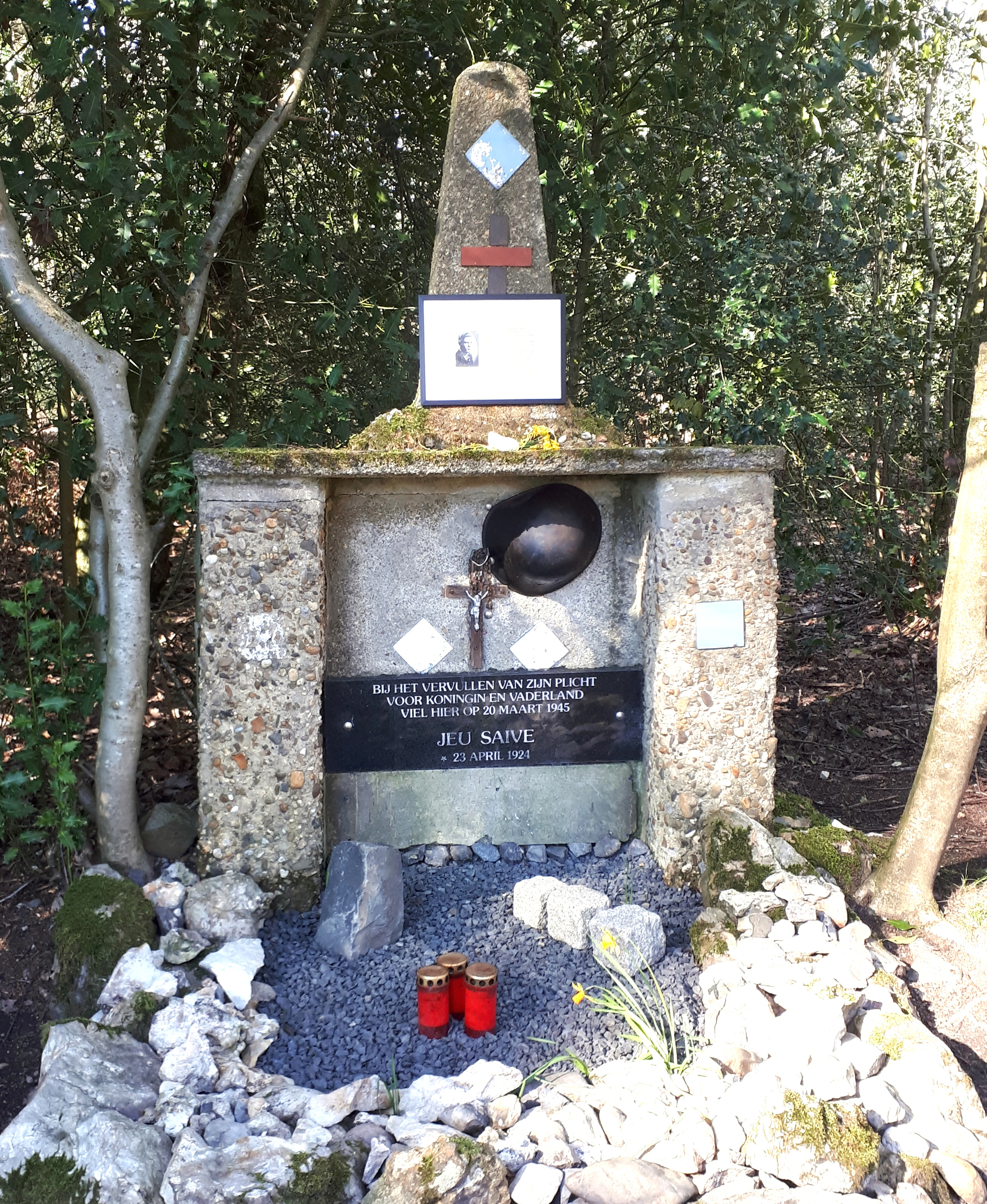
Jozef Saive memorial

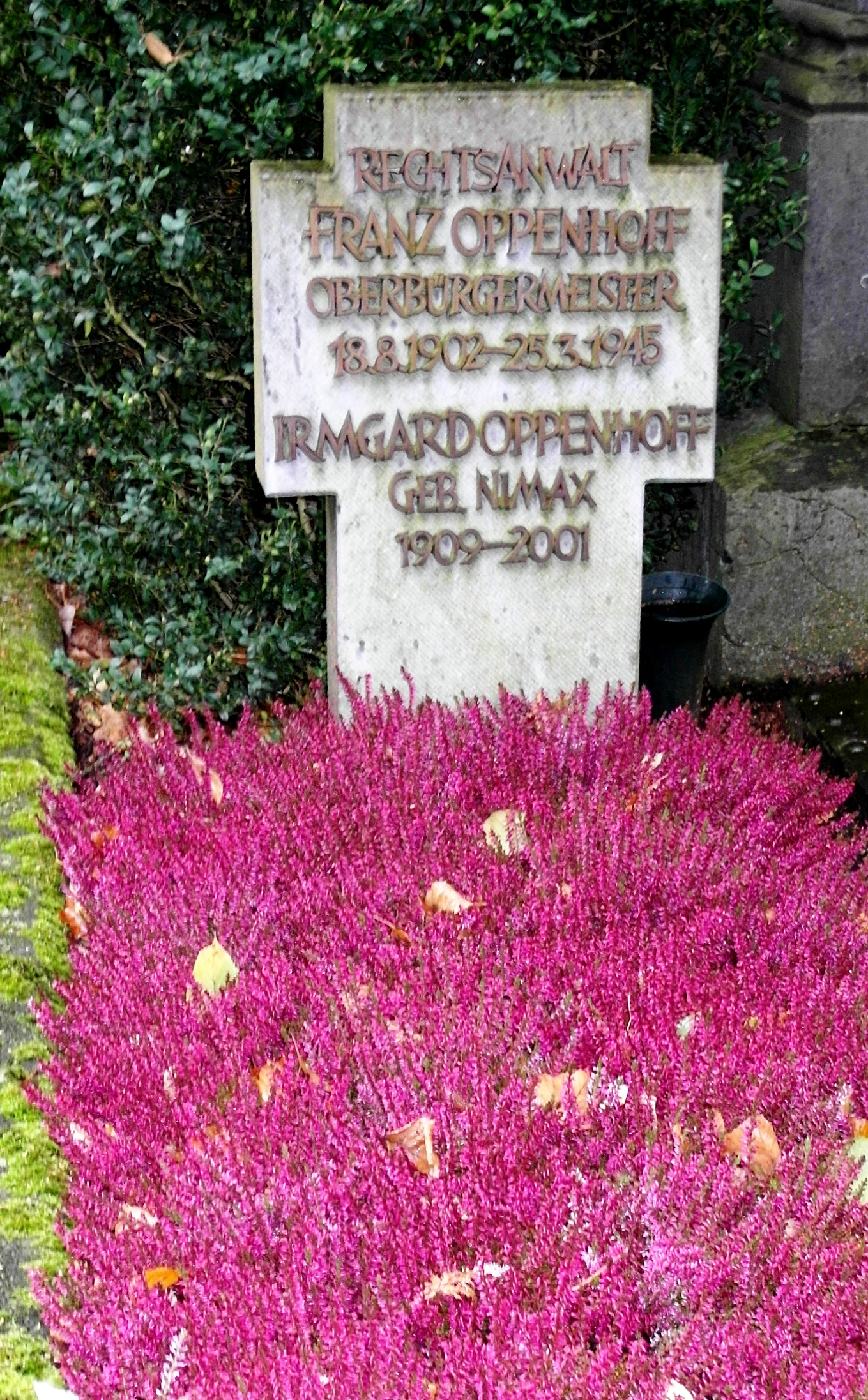
Oppenhoff's grave in Aachen

Oppenhoff was considered a traitor and a collaborator by the Nazi regime, and his assassination, codenamed Unternehmen Karneval ("Operation Carnival"), was ordered by Heinrich Himmler, planned by SS Obergruppenführer Hans-Adolf Prützmann, and carried out by an assassination unit composed of four SS men and two members of the Hitler Youth.

The unit was commanded by SS Untersturmführer Herbert Wenzel, who was a training officer at Prützmann's Werwolf training facility at Hülchrath Castle, near Erkelenz; Wenzel arranged the necessary equipment and decided on methods. Unterscharführer (Sergeant) Josef Leitgeb, also a training officer at Hülchrath, was second-in-command. Ilse Hirsch, a 23-year-old Nazi youth leader, a Hauptgruppenführerin (captain) in the League of German Girls (BDM) was supposed to provide supplies, but turned out to play an important part in the operation. Wenzel also picked a Werwolf trainee from Hülchrath to accompany them, 16-year-old Erich Morgenschweiss. Two former members of the Border Patrol (Karl-Heinz Hennemann and Georg Heidorn) completed the team, to act as guides in the area around Aachen.

The unit parachuted from a captured B-17 bomber (most likely from Kampfgeschwader 200 "Wulf Hound") into a Belgian forest near the town of Gemmenich, on 20 March 1945. They killed the 20 year old Dutch border guard Jozef Saive at the frontier, then moved on to set up camp near the target. Hirsch became separated from the rest and made her own way to Aachen, where she contacted a friend in the BDM and discovered Oppenhoff's whereabouts.

The rest of the unit arrived in Aachen on 25 March. Wenzel, Leitgeb and one other confronted Oppenhoff on his own doorstep after he had been fetched from a party at his neighbours' house. They pretended to be German pilots who were looking for the German lines. Oppenhoff tried to persuade them to surrender. Wenzel hesitated, and Leitgeb shouted "Heil Hitler" and shot Oppenhoff in the head. Just before a US patrol arrived to check the telephone line which Wenzel had previously cut, the three assassins scattered.

While escaping from the city, Hirsch triggered a landmine which injured her knee and killed Leitgeb.

Already dissatisfied with Oppenhoff, the Americans did not investigate his death thoroughly at the time; a theory was that an official Oppenhoff had dismissed had killed him. Six months later, investigators learned the truth. After the war, Morgenschweiss, Hirsch, Heidorn and Hennemann were tracked down and arrested. They were tried in Aachen in October 1949 for the assassination of Oppenhoff, with the killing of Jozef Saive being excused as an "Act of War”. Hennemann and Heidorn were found guilty and sentenced to between one and four years in prison, Hirsch was not charged, and Morgenschwitz was set free. In two follow-up proceedings, the prison sentences were further mitigated by the same court and finally completely waived under the Impunity Act of 1954 "due to emergency orders". The Aachen lawyer Hans-Werner Fröhlich found out in 2013 that the presiding judge of the Aachen Chamber had been a member of the NSDAP since 1937 and a member of a special court set up by the National Socialists; an assessor of the jury court had also been a member of the NSDAP. According to research by the historian Hannes Heer, Wenzel is said to have lived in today's Namibia under the name Fritz Brandt and died in 1981. Hirsch died in 2000.
