= William Clark (cricketer) =

Scottish cricketer, cricket administrator, and solicitor

Personal information
- Full name: William Clark
- Born: 8 September 1905; Crieff, Perthshire, Scotland
- Died: 6 April 1990 (aged 84); Stirlingshire, Stirlingshire, Scotland
- Batting: Right-handed
- Role: Wicket-keeper

Domestic team information
- Years: Team
- 1946: Scotland

Career statistics
Competition	First-class
Matches	1
Runs scored	13
Batting average	6.50
100s/50s	–/–
Top score	9
Catches/stumpings	1/1
- Source: Cricinfo, 18 July 2022

William Clark (8 September 1905 — 6 April 1990) was a Scottish first-class cricketer, cricket administrator, and solicitor.

== Early life and education ==
Clark was born in September 1905 at Crieff, Perthshire. He was educated at the Grove Academy.

== Career ==
A club cricketer for Stirling County Cricket Club, Clark made a single appearance in first-class cricket for Scotland as a wicket-keeper against Ireland at Greenock in 1946. Batting twice in the match, he was dismissed for 4 runs in the Scottish first innings by John Hill, while in their second innings he was dismissed for 9 runs by the same bowler; in his capacity as wicket-keeper, he took a single catch and made a single stumping. Clark later served as the president of the Scottish Cricket Union in 1958, succeeding W. D. Ritchie. By profession, Clark was a solicitor who was a senior partner in the firm J. M. & J. Mailer.

== Personal life ==
Clark died at Kildean Hospital in Stirling on 6 April 1990.
