= Josef Velek =

Czech journalist, author, and environmentalist (1939–1990)

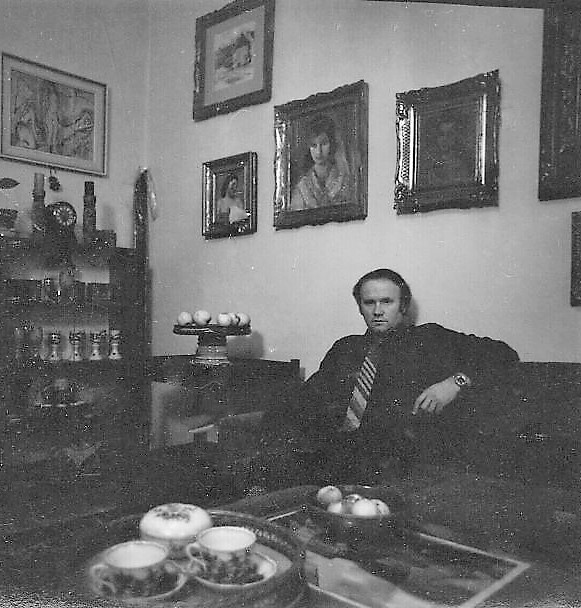
- Josef Velek in his apartment. Mid 1980s. Photo by Tomáš Fassati
- Born: 30 November 1939; Klínec, Czech Republic
- Died: 30 April 1990 (aged 50); Red Sea
- Occupations: Journalist, author, environmentalist
- Awards: Global 500 Roll of Honour

Josef Velek ['jozɛf 'ʋɛlɛk], ing. (Master of Arts, Technology) (30 November 1939 – 30 April 1990) was a Czechoslovak (Czech) journalist, author and environmentalist.

== Biography ==
Velek was born on 30 November 1939 in Klínec, Czech Republic.

He graduated in 1974, from the Faculty of Electrical Engineering of the Czech Technical University in Prague and in the same year co-founded the Brontosaurus Movement focused on nature conservation within the framework of the then official Socialist Youth Union.

He began to publish in the sixties, and from 1975 was a member of the editorial staff of the Mladý svět (Young world) weekly. He was considered a founder of the Czechoslovak environment-oriented journalism, and has repeatedly faced threats due to his critical texts.

In June 1989, he was the first Czech to be included in the United Nations Global 500 honour roll of individuals and organizations that have made a significant contribution to the protection and improvement of the environment.

Velek died on 30 April 1990, while scuba diving in the Red Sea.

== Published works ==
- Jak jsem bránil přírodu (1980)
- Od polderů k Ardenám (1985)
- Příběhy pro dvě nohy (1988)
- Muž přes plot (1989)

== Awards ==
- 1990: Global 500 Roll of Honour
