= Brains Benton =

Series of mystery novels

Written in the late 1950s and early 1960s, the Brains Benton Mysteries chronicle the adventures of young teenagers Barclay "Brains" Benton (X) and his friend James "Jimmy" Carson (Operative Three); they together form the "Benton and Carson International Detective Agency." The Brains Benton books are similar in tone to The Mad Scientists' Club books.

The series was originally published by the Golden Press, with reprints being done in the same format by Whitman Books, both imprints of Western Publishing. All six titles appeared in hardback with only two volumes being reprinted in paperback.

== Characters ==
Main Characters

Barclay "Brains" Benton is the central character in the series. He is in his early teens at the beginning of the series. Tall and thin, with glasses and red hair, Brains is knowledgeable beyond his years. He talks in polysyllabics and his mind is a warehouse of scientific and social information. He would be regarded by the other boys in school as nerdy, except that he is also the star pitcher for the school baseball team (He's not a sports fan--he is intrigued with the biomechanics of baseball pitching). His parents, professors at the local college, have allowed him the use of the room over the garage, which he has converted into a crime lab, calling it his "inner sanctum."

James MacDonald "Jimmy" Carson is Brains' partner. He narrates the action in the stories. Together they form the Benton and Carson International Detective Agency, for which they actually have elegant business cards. Jimmy is the opposite of Brains in many ways--average height and build, he has a paper route for the local newspaper, the Crestwood Daily Ledger. Because of his average appearance, he is well suited to tailing suspects. Jimmy adds a dimension of down-to-earth common sense to many of Brains' ideas and theories as they work on various cases.

Secondary characters

Ann Carson is Jimmy's seventeen-year-old big sister.

Mrs. Ray is the Benton's housekeeper. Loud, nosy, and opinionated, she is an excellent cook.

"Stinky" Green is Jimmy's friend, who substitutes for him on his newspaper route when necessary.

"Stony" Rhodes is another boy Jimmy's age, the neighborhood nuisance. He wants to join the detective agency, but neither Brains nor Jimmy think he has the necessary ability.

"Horsey" Peters is the Crestwood School principal.

Chief Hadley is the pompous Chief of Police in Crestwood.

Lew Jarman is the star reporter for the Crestwood Daily Ledger.

Also there are Jimmy's parents and Brains' parents. Jimmy's mother is the typical mother/housewife of the late 1950s, and his father works as an accountant for the gas company. Brains' father is a history professor at Crestwood College, and his mother teaches art there.

== Titles ==
1. The Case of the Missing Message (1959). When Jimmy braves the spooky old Madden place, he spots a boy in hiding. Thinking he's kidnapped, he and Brains sneak in and foil a real kidnapper, while rescue arrives atop a stampeding elephant!
2. The Case of the Counterfeit Coin (1960). When Jimmy receives an "ancient" Greek coin on his paper route, he and Brains are stalked by mysterious strangers out to steal it back and a feisty girl with a mean right hook!
3. The Case of the Stolen Dummy (1961). When the boys venture to creepy Boiling Lake, they spot a submerged car - with a body inside - and end up chasing crooks on a wild midnight ride in a hot rod!
4. The Case of the Roving Rolls (1961). When the boys meet a Rolls-Royce on the run and a real prince with a problem, they finally use the "international" in "Benton and Carson International Detective Agency"!
5. The Case of the Waltzing Mouse (1961). When the boys help an old man with a traveling animal act, they end up scuba diving for "treasure" and barely survive a boat chase in the "Battle of Lake Carmine"!
6. The Case of the Painted Dragon (1961). When the boys meet a new classmate, an orphaned Japanese boy with a Sumo bodyguard, they're pitched into a search for missing pearls and a conspiracy of dangerous thugs.

The books were written by Charles Spain Verral. However, after book #1, all of the remaining books had the pen name of George Wyatt as author. Verral had turned over the writing to another author but was not pleased with the results; he then took the outlines of each book and rewrote them.

== Later volumes by other authors ==
Charles Spain Verral's characters have inspired a generation of twenty-first century authors who endeavor to continue the Brains Benton series. Apart from the books penned by Morgan, which have the approval of Verral's son, these are unofficial fan fiction and have no connection to the original author and publishers.

By Charles E. Morgan III:

1. The Case of the Carrier Pigeon (2006)
2. The Case of the Lost Loot (2004)
3. The Case of the Stolen Jewelry (2009)
4. The Case of The Final Message (2011)
5. The Case of the Disappearing Magician (2014)
6. The Case of the Crossed Wire (2016)
7. The Case of the Aviator's Plans (2017)
8. The Case of the Crooked Deal (2018)
9. The Case of the Spy's Revenge (2018)
10. The Case of the Ghost Town's Secret (2020)
11. The Case of the Templar's Sword (2021)
12. The Case of the Sour Note (2024)
13. The Case of the Glowing Specter (2025)
14. The Adventures of Benton and Carson (2016) This is a series of six short stories. The first one describes the case in which Jimmy first meets Brains on the roof of the school building. A later story is actually narrated by Brains himself and includes some surprising comments about his partner. There are also stories set at Christmas and Veteran's Day.

By Fred Rexroad

1. The Case of the Wounded Pigeon (2008)

By Scott Lockwood:

1. The Case of the Courier Cat (2010)
2. A Scandal at Crestwood College (2010)
3. Brains Benton and the Subtraction Mystery (2010)
4. Brains Benton and the Case of the Other Missing Message (2016)

The last two of these are set later in time, when Brains and Jimmy are adults. Brains has taken a position with SwifTech Labs (headed by non-other than Tom Swift Jr.) and has a girlfriend who is an investigative reporter.

By Thomas Hudson:

1. The Case of the Insane Woman Down Memory Lane (2015)

By Sean Murphy:

1. The Case of the Dancing Walrus (2015). Contains three stories.
2. The Case of the Haunted Airplane (2021)
