= Ilse Hirsch =

German BDM captain (1922–2000)

Ilse Hirsch (1922–2000) was a German Bund Deutscher Mädel (BDM) Hauptgruppenführerin (captain) famous as part of the six-person team that participated in Operation Carnival in 1945.

== Early life ==
Hirsch was born in Hamm. She joined the BDM at age sixteen and became one of its principal organizers in the town of Monschau. In the late stages of World War II, she was part of Werwolf (German for "werewolf"), a German partisan group that operated behind enemy lines.

== Operation Carnival ==
Operation Carnival (German: Unternehmen Karneval) was a Werwolf mission authorized by Heinrich Himmler to assassinate Franz Oppenhoff, who, in October 1944, was appointed mayor of Aachen by the Americans after they took control of the city. Hitler took a personal interest in this appointment and ordered Oppenhoff's elimination.

=== Team ===
The team assembled by Generalinspekteur für Spezialabwehr Hans-Adolf Prützmann, who was given the task by Himmler, was:

- Untersturmführer-SS (Lt.) Herbert Wenzel
- Austrian Unterscharführer-SS (Sergeant) Josef "Sepp" Leitgeb
- Former border Patrolman Karl-Heinz Hennemann
- Former border Patrolman Georg Heidorn
- Werwolf trainee 16-year-old Erich Morgenschweiss
- Werwolf Hauptgruppenführerin (Captain) Ilse Hirsch.

=== Plan ===
The team's plan was to move to their first base camp in dense woodlands along the German-Belgian frontier. Morgenschweiss and Hirsch, who knew the city well and acted as guide, would enter town and locate their target. After identifying his daily schedule, they would pass the information to Wenzel and Leitgeb. Following the assassination, the team would head east toward friendly lines. They were to stick to the plan even if separated. Traveling strictly at night, they would hide in forester and game warden cabins during daylight. All carried forged papers identifying them as members of the Reich's Organisation Todt labour force. If captured, they were to convince their interrogators that they were working on nearby border fortifications.

=== Assassination ===
On 20 March 1945, the team were flown in a captured, Luftwaffe-operated B-17 Flying Fortress from Hildesheim airfield near Hanover and parachuted around the village of Gemmenich. Upon landing they were discovered by a 20-year-old Dutch border guard, Jozef Saive, whom they shot.

The team then made for Eupener Strasse 251, where Oppenhoff lived with his wife Irmgard and their three children. He was away at a party so they asked the housekeeper to send for him. When Oppenhoff arrived, Wenzel—who had assured his accomplices he would do the shooting—lost his nerve. Leitgeb cried "Heil Hitler!", grabbed the pistol and shot Oppenhoff dead.

While escaping with Leitgeb, Hirsch tripped a buried landmine. She injured her knee, and Leitgeb was killed.

== Later life ==
After the war the surviving members of the Werwolf group were located. At trial in 1949, they were found guilty of killing Oppenhoff and sentenced to 1–4 years in prison. Hirsch was acquitted and another of the team members was never charged. Hirsch married and had two daughters and one son. In subsequent proceedings the convicted members saw their sentences reduced and finally completely quashed under the Straffreiheitsgesetz 1954 (Impunity Law 1954) on the grounds of "command emergency".
