= Bob Kelsey =

Australian rules footballer

Robert Kelsey

Personal information
- Full name: Bob Kelsey
- Born: 27 September 1925
- Died: 19 April 1990 (aged 64)
- Original team: Port Melbourne
- Height: 180 cm (5 ft 11 in)
- Weight: 72 kg (159 lb)

Playing career^{1}
Years	Club	Games (Goals)
1947–48	Carlton	20 (3)
- ^{1} Playing statistics correct to the end of 1948.

Bob Kelsey (27 September 1925 – 19 April 1990) was an Australian rules footballer who played with Carlton in the Victorian Football League (VFL).
