= Wally Coates =

Australian rules footballer, born 1911

Personal information
- Full name: Walter Emmanuel Coates
- Born: 4 January 1911; Romsey, Victoria
- Died: 19 April 1990 (aged 79)
- Original team: Carlton Seconds / East Brunswick
- Height: 180 cm (5 ft 11 in)
- Weight: 76 kg (168 lb)

Playing career^{1}
Years	Club	Games (Goals)
1932	Fitzroy	2 (0)
1937	Essendon	5 (2)
Total		7 (2)
- ^{1} Playing statistics correct to the end of 1937.

Walter Emmanuel Coates (4 January 1911 – 19 April 1990) was an Australian rules footballer who played with Fitzroy and Essendon in the Victorian Football League (VFL).
