= James Cockburn (cricketer) =

Australian cricketer

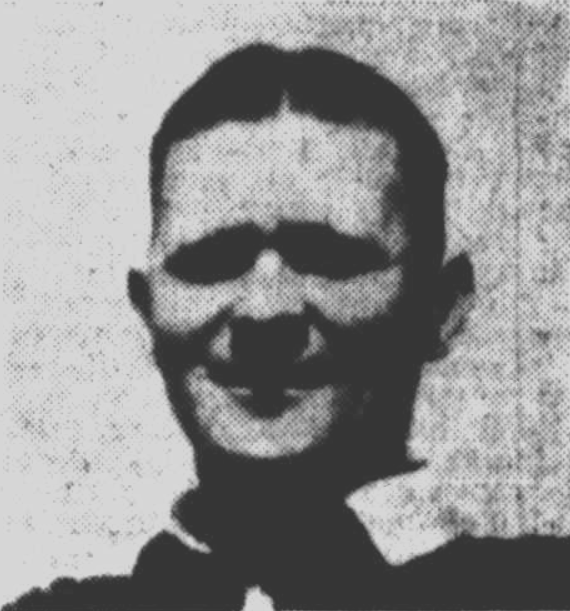

Personal information
- Full name: James Sydney Cockburn
- Born: 8 November 1897; Maryborough, Queensland, Australia
- Died: 3 December 1951 (aged 54); Sutherland, N.S.W, Australia
- Role: Fast Bowler
- Source: Cricinfo, 1 October 2020

James Sydney Cockburn (20 May 1916 – 13 November 1990) was an Australian cricketer. He played in two first-class matches for Queensland in 1936/37.

== See also ==
- List of Queensland first-class cricketers
