= Klínec =

- Municipality
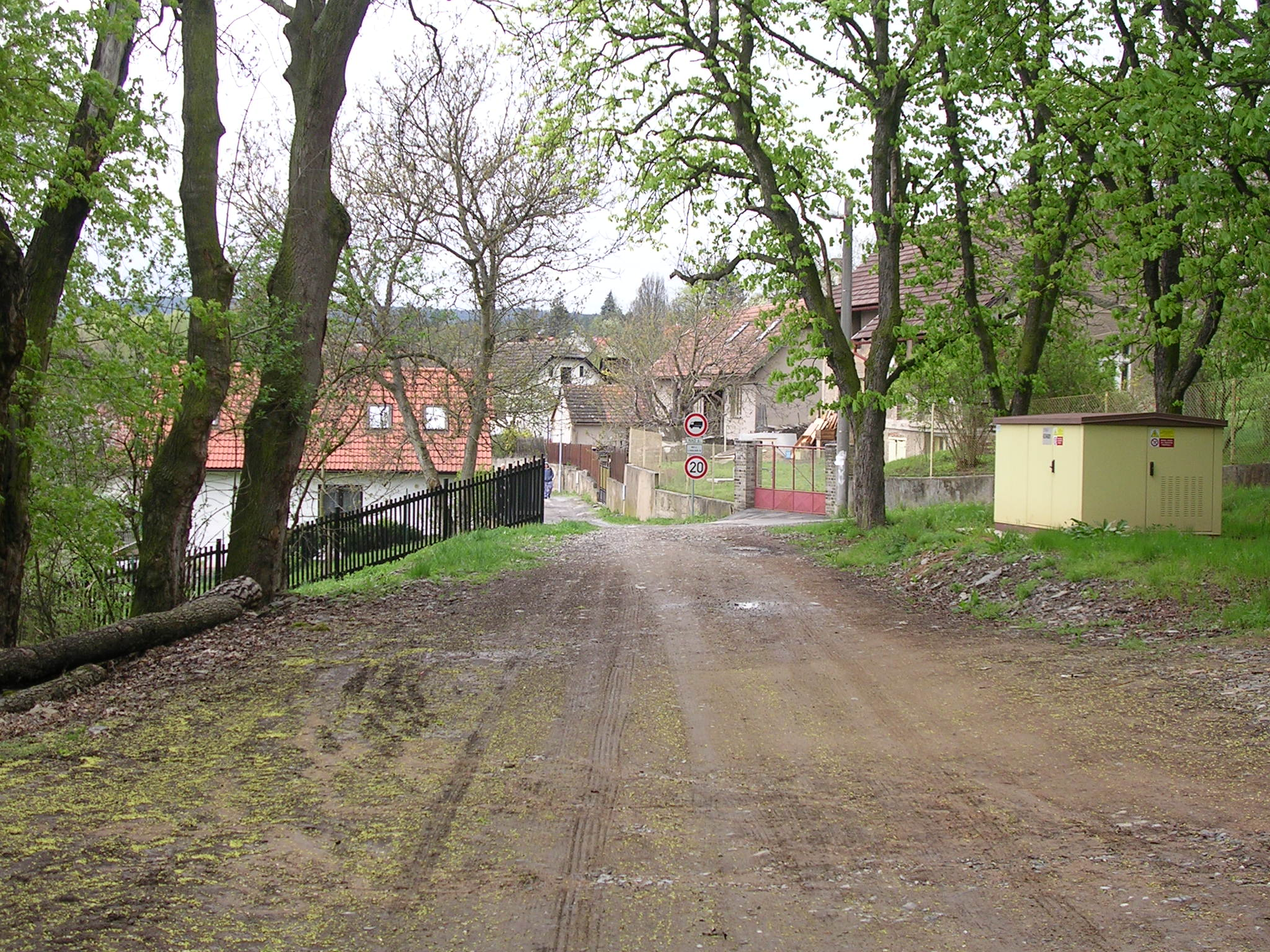
- View from east

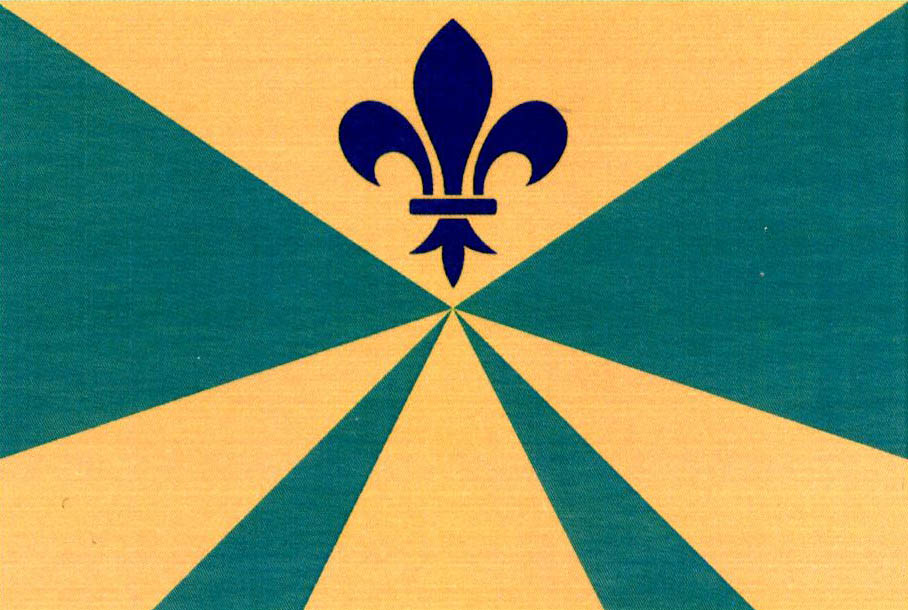
- Flag Coat of arms

- Location in the Czech Republic
- Coordinates: 49°54′3″N 14°20′36″E
- Country: Czech Republic
- Region: Central Bohemian
- District: Prague-West
- First mentioned: 1310

Area
  - Total: 5.17 km^{2} (2.00 sq mi)
- Elevation: 285 m (935 ft)

Population (2026-01-01)
  - Total: 828
  - Density: 160/km^{2} (415/sq mi)
- Time zone: UTC+1 (CET)
  - Summer (DST): UTC+2 (CEST)
- Postal code: 252 02
- Website: www.obecklinec.eu

Klínec is a municipality and village in Prague-West District in the Central Bohemian Region of the Czech Republic. It has about 800 inhabitants.

== Demographics ==
Historical population
Year	Pop.	±%
1869	401	—
1880	411	+2.5%
1890	398	−3.2%
1900	394	−1.0%
1910	397	+0.8%
1921	345	−13.1%
1930	394	+14.2%
1950	430	+9.1%
1961	432	+0.5%
1970	397	−8.1%
1980	381	−4.0%
1991	346	−9.2%
2001	385	+11.3%
2011	599	+55.6%
2021	848	+41.6%
Source: Censuses
