= List of crime films of 1990 =

This is a list of crime films released in 1990.

Title	Director	Cast	Country	Notes
After Dark, My Sweet	James Foley	Jason Patric, Rachel Ward, Bruce Dern	United States	
Boiling Point	Beat Takeshi Kitano	Hisashi Igawa, Beat Takeshi Kitano	Japan	Crime comedy, crime drama
Bullet in the Head	John Woo	Jacky Cheung, Waise Lee, Simon Yam	Hong Kong	Gangster film
Cadillac Man	Roger Donaldson	Robin Williams, Tim Robbins, Pamela Reed, Fran Drescher	United States	Crime comedy
The Freshman	Andrew Bergman	Matthew Broderick, Marlon Brando, Bruno Kirby, Penelope Ann Miller, Frank Whaley, Maximilian Schell	United States	Gangster film
The Godfather Part III	Francis Ford Coppola	Al Pacino, Diane Keaton, Talia Shire, Andy García, Joe Mantegna, George Hamilton, Bridget Fonda, Sofia Coppola	United States	
GoodFellas	Martin Scorsese	Robert De Niro, Ray Liotta, Joe Pesci	United States	
The Grifters	Stephen Frears	John Cusack, Anjelica Huston, Annette Bening, Pat Hingle, Henry Jones, J.T. Walsh, Charles Napier	United States	
Internal Affairs	Mike Figgis	Richard Gere, Andy García, Nancy Travis, Laurie Metcalf	United States	
King of New York	Abel Ferrara	Christopher Walken, David Caruso, Laurence Fishburne, Wesley Snipes	United States; Italy	
The Krays	Peter Medak	Billie Whitelaw, Tom Bell, Gary Kemp	United Kingdom	
Maniac Cop 2	William Lustig	Robert Davi, Claudia Christian, Michael Lerner	United States	Crime thriller
Men of Respect	William Reilly	John Turturro, Katherine Borowitz, Dennis Farina, Rod Steiger	United States	
Miami Blues	George Armitage	Alec Baldwin, Fred Ward, Jennifer Jason Leigh	United States	
Miller's Crossing	Joel Coen	Gabriel Byrne, Albert Finney, Marcia Gay Harden, John Turturro, Jon Polito, J.E. Freeman	United States	
My Blue Heaven	Herbert Ross	Steve Martin, Rick Moranis, Joan Cusack, Melanie Mayron, Bill Irwin, William Hickey, Carol Kane, Daniel Stern	United States	Crime comedy
Q&A	Sidney Lumet	Nick Nolte, Timothy Hutton, Armand Assante	United States	Crime drama
Revenge	Tony Scott	Kevin Costner, Anthony Quinn, Madeleine Stowe	United States	Crime thriller
The Rookie	Clint Eastwood	Clint Eastwood, Charlie Sheen, Raul Julia, Sônia Braga, Tom Skerritt, Lara Flynn Boyle, Pepe Serna, Xander Berkeley	United States	
State of Grace	Phil Joanou	Sean Penn, Ed Harris, Gary Oldman, Robin Wright, John Turturro	United States	
