= Percy Kay =

Australian rules footballer, born 1910

Personal information
- Full name: Percival Thomas Kay
- Born: 30 June 1910; St Kilda, Victoria
- Died: 8 April 1990 (aged 79)
- Original team: Naval Base

Playing career^{1}
Years	Club	Games (Goals)
1932	St Kilda	3 (0)
- ^{1} Playing statistics correct to the end of 1932.

Percival Thomas Kay (30 June 1910 – 8 April 1990) was an Australian rules footballer who played with St Kilda in the Victorian Football League (VFL).
