= Douglas Green (cricketer) =

Australian cricketer

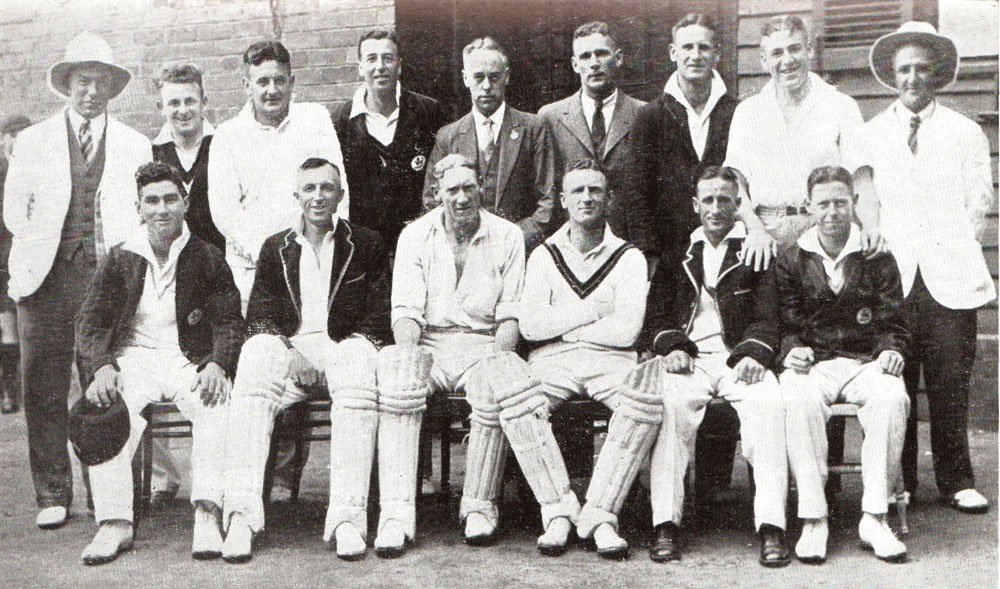
- The Tasmanian cricket team in 1932. Green is seated third from right.

Personal information
- Full name: Douglas Carling Green
- Born: 19 May 1902; Hobart, Tasmania, Australia
- Died: 28 November 1990 (aged 88); Hobart, Tasmania, Australia

Domestic team information
- Years: Team
- 1924-1937: Tasmania
- Source: Cricinfo, 1 March 2016

Douglas Green (19 May 1902 – 28 November 1990) was an Australian cricketer. He played 25 first-class matches for Tasmania between 1924 and 1937.

A determined batsman with a "rock-like defence" Doug Green's highest score was 150 not out, when, captaining Tasmania, he saved them from defeat against Victoria in 1932-33, batting throughout the last day's play to erase a 269-run first-innings deficit.

== See also ==
- List of Tasmanian representative cricketers
