= Ewald Kihle =

Norwegian footballer (1919-1990)

Personal information
- Date of birth: 11 August 1919
- Date of death: 16 April 1990 (aged 70)

International career
Years	Team	Apps	(Gls)
1951	Norway	2	(0)

Ewald Kihle (11 August 1919 – 16 April 1990) was a Norwegian footballer. He played in two matches for the Norway national football team in 1951.
