= Mieczysław Burda =

Polish ice hockey player (1916–1990)

- Born: April 19, 1916 Kraków, Austria-Hungary
- Died: April 29, 1990 (aged 74) Krynica, Poland
- Height: 5 ft 7 in (170 cm)
- Weight: 137 lb (62 kg; 9 st 11 lb)
- Position: Right wing
- Played for: Dąb Katowice; KTH Krynica; Cracovia; Gwardia Bydgoszcz
- National team: Poland
- Playing career: 1932–1939; 1947–1955

Mieczysław Burda (19 April 1916 – 29 April 1990) was a Polish ice hockey player. He played for Dąb Katowice, KTH Krynica, Cracovia, and Gwardia Bydgoszcz during his career. He also played for the Polish national team at the 1948 Winter Olympics, and three world championships, in 1937, 1938, and 1939. After his playing career he turned to coaching.
