= Laurie Yates =

Australian rules footballer

Personal information
- Full name: Laurence George Yates
- Born: 29 June 1922; Collingwood, Victoria
- Died: 24 April 1990 (aged 67)
- Original team: Collingwood Districts
- Height: 180 cm (5 ft 11 in)
- Weight: 80.5 kg (177 lb)

Playing career^{1}
Years	Club	Games (Goals)
1946	Collingwood	1 (0)
- ^{1} Playing statistics correct to the end of 1946.

Laurence George Yates (29 June 1922 – 24 April 1990) was an Australian rules footballer who played with Collingwood in the Victorian Football League (VFL).
