= Jim Maguire (Australian footballer) =

Australian rules footballer, born 1918

Personal information
- Full name: Jim Maguire
- Born: 2 November 1918
- Died: 26 April 1990 (aged 71)
- Original team: Terang / Eckland
- Height: 183 cm (6 ft 0 in)
- Weight: 87 kg (192 lb)

Playing career^{1}
Years	Club	Games (Goals)
1944–45	Hawthorn	6 (4)
- ^{1} Playing statistics correct to the end of 1945.

Jim Maguire (2 November 1918 – 26 April 1990) was an Australian rules footballer who played with Hawthorn in the Victorian Football League (VFL).
