= Lillian Miller =

American television personality (1897–1990)

- Born: Lillian Dorothy Miller; May 26, 1897
- Died: April 1, 1990 (aged 92)

Lillian Dorothy Miller (May 26, 1897 – April 1, 1990) better known as Miss Miller, was an American television personality. She was a regular audience member of various television variety shows from the 1950s to the 1980s.

== Career ==
Miller was born in Boston in a Jewish family and was the youngest of four children. Later, she had a daytime job as a government typist, but retired in 1958 due to eye trouble. She began her audience career with radio programs in 1940, in New York. In 1948 she was living in Hollywood, California. She first went on stage in 1949, helping Sammy Kaye lead his band on his radio show So You Want to Lead a Band. In 1950, she moved back East, to New York City, then to Philadelphia, and then back to New York City.

Miller was first regular audience member of The Tonight Show throughout Steve Allen's and Jack Paar's tenures as host. Miss Miller was even brought along when the New York City-based show would go on location to places such as Havana, Cuba, Hollywood, California, and Niagara Falls. She became such a fixture on the show that she joined AFTRA, the TV actors' union.

When Paar left Tonight to start his prime-time Jack Paar Program in 1962, Miss Miller became a regular on that program as well as on The Tonight Show Starring Johnny Carson and The Merv Griffin Show. On at least one Paar program, shown on November 29, 1962, Miss Miller was an on-stage guest alongside Liberace and Cassius Clay. Even with numerous network and syndicator changes, as well as a changing of base from New York to Hollywood, Miller remained a fixture on Griffin's program throughout its run, which ended in 1986. She was sometimes featured in the commercials for Griffin's show. She was also regular on The Carol Burnett Show, frequently bantering with Burnett during the program's opening question-and-answer session with the audience.

During the mid-1980s, Miller was frequent guest at The Limelight in Atlanta, Georgia. She hosted parties, met with then-mayor Andrew Young and danced the night away with other celebrities. She had been photographed many times by entertainment photographer Guy D'Alema when she was in the Limelight.
