= Vic Samson =

Australian rules footballer

Personal information
- Full name: Victor Alfred Samson
- Born: 4 March 1892; Williamstown, Victoria
- Died: 5 April 1990 (aged 98); Lakes Entrance, Victoria
- Height: 175 cm (5 ft 9 in)
- Weight: 79 kg (174 lb)

Playing career^{1}
Years	Club	Games (Goals)
1925–26	Footscray	27 (8)
- ^{1} Playing statistics correct to the end of 1926.

Victor Alfred Samson (4 March 1892 – 5 April 1990) was a former Australian rules footballer who played with Footscray in the Victorian Football League (VFL).
