= Reg Nicholls (footballer) =

Australian rules footballer

Personal information
- Full name: Reginald James Nicholls
- Born: 27 February 1922; MacLeod, Victoria
- Died: 28 April 1990 (aged 68)
- Original team: Heidelberg West
- Height: 183 cm (6 ft 0 in)
- Weight: 83 kg (183 lb)

Playing career^{1}
Years	Club	Games (Goals)
1946–1950	Fitzroy	83 (3)
- ^{1} Playing statistics correct to the end of 1950.

Reginald "Reg" James Nicholls (27 February 1922 – 28 April 1990) was an Australian rules footballer who played with Fitzroy in the Victorian Football League (VFL). Nicholls was Fitzroy Vice Captain.

== Career ==
Nicholls, a defender, could play as either a half back flanker or key defender. He made 83 appearances for Fitzroy in five seasons, which included a semi-final and preliminary final in 1947. A three-time Victorian interstate representative, Nicholls played against South Australia at the MCG in 1948, then twice in 1949, against both South Australia and Western Australia.

He left Fitzroy in 1951, to coach Golden Point, a club in the Ballarat Football League. Coach for two seasons, Nicholls was replaced by Lance Collins in 1953, but remained at Golden Point as a player. He was a member of Golden Point's 1953 premiership team.

== Personal life ==
Nicholls was born in MacLeod, Victoria.

Reg was married with 2 Children.

His brother, Geoff Nicholls, played for Collingwood and Fitzroy.
