= John Hill (Irish cricketer) =

Irish cricketer

Cricket information
- Batting: Right-handed
- Bowling: Off spin

International information
- National side: Ireland

Career statistics
Competition	First-class
Matches	7
Runs scored	82
Batting average	16.40
100s/50s	0/0
Top score	18*
Balls bowled	1,027
Wickets	17
Bowling average	21.58
5 wickets in innings	0
10 wickets in match	0
Best bowling	3/16
Catches/stumpings	1/–
- Source: CricketArchive, 16 November 2022

John William Hill (10 February 1912 – 17 January 1984) was an Irish cricketer. A right-handed batsman and off spin bowler, he played fourteen times for the Ireland cricket team between 1946 and 1951, including seven first-class matches.

== Playing career ==
He made his debut for Ireland against Scotland in July 1946 in a first-class match. His second game was also against Scotland in May 1947. The year continued with a match against Yorkshire during which he took 3/16 in the Yorkshire first innings, his best first-class bowling figures. This was followed by a match against the Craven Gentlemen and a three match series against South Africa before a match against the MCC at Lord's during which he made his highest score (27 not out) and took his best bowling (5/67) for Ireland.

He played against the MCC, Scotland and Yorkshire in 1948 and against Nottinghamshire and Scotland in 1950 before his final game for Ireland against Scotland in June 1951.

== Statistics ==
In all matches for Ireland, he scored 138 runs at an average of 11.50. He took 32 wickets at an average of 22.16, taking five wickets in an innings once.
