= Charles Spain Verral =

Canadian writer and illustrator

Charles Spain Verral (November 7, 1904 – April 1, 1990) was a writer and illustrator born in Ontario, Canada. He wrote Street & Smith's Bill Barnes pulp series novels, among others. Among the most widely read of his books are the Brains Benton Mysteries, a six-book series published from 1959 to 1961. He also published many other children's works, including Lassie, Rin Tin Tin, and Popeye.

== Some of Verral's Other Works ==
- Captain of the Ice, 1955
- Annie Oakley Sharpshooter, 1956
- Lassie and the Daring Rescue, 1956
- Rin Tin Tin and the Outlaw, 1957
- The Lone Ranger and Tonto, 1957
- Rin Tin Tin and the Hidden Treasure, 1958
- Lassie and Her Day in the Sun, 1958
- JETS, 1971
- Babe Ruth, Sultan of Swat, 1976
- Popeye Climbs a Mountain, 1980
- Popeye and the Haunted House, 1980
- Popeye Goes Fishing, 1983
