= Joe Asquini =

Canadian football player

Profile
- Positions: Forward, Halfback

Personal information
- Born: c. 1925
- Died: April 9, 1990 (aged 65); Ottawa, Ontario, Canada
- Listed height: 6 ft 0 in (1.83 m)
- Listed weight: 190 lb (86 kg)

Career history
- 1945–1951: Ottawa Rough Riders

Awards and highlights
- Grey Cup champion (1951)

Joseph Asquini (c. 1925 – April 9, 1990) was a Canadian professional football player who played for the Ottawa Rough Riders. He won the Grey Cup with them in 1951.

Asquini began playing Canadian football in 1942 while attending Ottawa Technical High School, though he also played basketball, ice hockey and track and field. As a senior in 1944, he was awarded the Gerry Boucher Memorial Trophy, given to the Interscholastic Football League senior "who best combines sportsmanship and ability," as well the Mayor of Ottawa Trophy, given to the most outstanding athlete at Ottawa Tech. Asquini led the league in scoring and helped his team reach the league championship game after beating the defending champions, St. Patrick's, in the semifinals.

Asquini tried out for the Ottawa Rough Riders in 1945. He entered a quarterback battle with Ken Preston, Frank Dunlap, Marty Swords, and Gordie McCullagh. Asquini quickly settled into a backup role behind Preston ahead of the season opener.

Asquini was married to Alice Richards and they had four children: Jo-Ann, Michael, Peter and David. He died on April 9, 1990.
