= 1988 Chicago White Sox season =

1988 Chicago White Sox
- League: American League
- Division: West
- Ballpark: Comiskey Park
- City: Chicago
- Owners: Jerry Reinsdorf
- General managers: Larry Himes
- Managers: Jim Fregosi
- Television: WFLD; Sportsvision (John Rooney, Tom Paciorek)
- Radio: WMAQ (AM) (Del Crandall, Lorn Brown); WTAQ (Frank Diaz, Jose Manuel Flores)

The 1988 Chicago White Sox season was the White Sox's 89th season. They finished with a record of 71–90, good enough for fifth place in the American League West, 32.5 games behind the first place Oakland Athletics.

== Offseason ==
- November 12, 1987: Richard Dotson and Scott Nielsen were traded by the White Sox to the New York Yankees for Dan Pasqua, Steve Rosenberg and Mark Salas.
- November 16, 1987: Jeff Schaefer was signed as a free agent by the White Sox.
- December 8, 1987: Rodney McCray was drafted by the White Sox from the San Diego Padres in the 1987 minor league draft.
- December 10, 1987: Floyd Bannister and Dave Cochrane were traded by the White Sox to the Kansas City Royals for Mélido Pérez, John Davis, Greg Hibbard and Chuck Mount (minors).
- February 9, 1988: José DeLeón was traded by the White Sox to the St. Louis Cardinals for Lance Johnson, Ricky Horton and cash.

== Regular season ==
- Twenty-six days and 21 losses after leaving spring training, the Baltimore Orioles finally got their first win of the season. The runs came in bunches and the pitching staff threw a shutout as the O's downed the Chicago White Sox, 9–0.

=== Season standings ===
AL West
Team	W	L	Pct.	GB	Home	Road
Oakland Athletics	104	58	.642	—	54‍–‍27	50‍–‍31
Minnesota Twins	91	71	.562	13	47‍–‍34	44‍–‍37
Kansas City Royals	84	77	.522	19½	44‍–‍36	40‍–‍41
California Angels	75	87	.463	29	35‍–‍46	40‍–‍41
Chicago White Sox	71	90	.441	32½	40‍–‍41	31‍–‍49
Texas Rangers	70	91	.435	33½	38‍–‍43	32‍–‍48
Seattle Mariners	68	93	.422	35½	37‍–‍44	31‍–‍49

=== Record vs. opponents ===
1988 American League record Sources:
Team	BAL	BOS	CAL	CWS	CLE	DET	KC	MIL	MIN	NYY	OAK	SEA	TEX	TOR
Baltimore	—	4–9	5–7	4–7	4–9	5–8	0–12	4–9	3–9	3–10	4–8	7–5	6–6	5–8
Boston	9–4	—	8–4	7–5	8–5	6–7	6–6	10–3	7–5	9–4	3–9	6–6	8–4	2–11
California	7–5	4–8	—	9–4	8–4	5–7	5–8	3–9	4–9	6–6	4–9	6–7	8–5	6–6
Chicago	7–4	5–7	4–9	—	3–9	3–9	7–6	6–6	4–9	3–9	5–8	9–4	8–5	7–5
Cleveland	9–4	5–8	4–8	9–3	—	4–9	6–6	9–4	5–7	6–7	4–8	5–7	6–6	6–7
Detroit	8–5	7–6	7–5	9–3	9–4	—	8–4	5–8	1–11	8–5	4–8	9–3	8–4	5–8
Kansas City	12–0	6–6	8–5	6–7	6–6	4–8	—	3–9	7–6	6–6	8–5	7–5	7–6	4–8
Milwaukee	9–4	3–10	9–3	6–6	4–9	8–5	9–3	—	7–5	6–7	3–9	8–4	8–4	7–6
Minnesota	9–3	5–7	9–4	9–4	7–5	11–1	6–7	5–7	—	3–9	5–8	8–5	7–6	7–5
New York	10–3	4–9	6–6	9–3	7–6	5–8	6–6	7–6	9–3	—	6–6	5–7	5–6	6–7
Oakland	8–4	9–3	9–4	8–5	8–4	8–4	5–8	9–3	8–5	6–6	—	9–4	8–5	9–3
Seattle	5–7	6–6	7–6	4–9	7–5	3–9	5–7	4–8	5–8	7–5	4–9	—	6–7	5–7
Texas	6–6	4–8	5–8	5–8	6–6	4–8	6–7	4–8	6–7	6–5	5–8	7–6	—	6–6
Toronto	8–5	11–2	6–6	5–7	7–6	8–5	8–4	6–7	5–7	7–6	3–9	7–5	6–6	—

=== 1988 Opening Day lineup ===
- Lance Johnson, CF
- Ozzie Guillén, SS
- Harold Baines, DH
- Iván Calderón, RF
- Greg Walker, 1B
- Carlton Fisk, C
- Dan Pasqua, LF
- Kenny Williams, 3B
- Donnie Hill, 2B
- Ricky Horton, P

=== Notable transactions ===
- June 1, 1988: Robin Ventura was drafted by the White Sox in the 1st round (10th pick) of the 1988 amateur draft. Player signed October 21, 1988.
- August 4, 1988: Mike Maksudian and Vince Harris (minors) were traded by the White Sox to the New York Mets for Tom McCarthy and Steve Springer.
- August 19, 1988: Gary Redus was traded by the White Sox to the Pittsburgh Pirates for Mike Diaz.
- August 30, 1988: Ricky Horton was traded by the White Sox to the Los Angeles Dodgers for Shawn Hillegas.
- September 25, 1988: Jim Morris was signed as a free agent by the White Sox.

=== Roster ===
1988 Chicago White Sox
Roster
Pitchers: 32 Jeff Bittiger; 52 Joel Davis; 31 John Davis; 45 Shawn Hillegas; 26 Ricky Horton; 38 Barry Jones; 38 Dave LaPoint; 47 Bill Long; 56 Ravelo Manzanillo; 57 Tom McCarthy; 40 Jack McDowell; 25 Donn Pall; 34 Ken Patterson; 48 John Pawlowski; 33 Mélido Pérez; 42 Adam Peterson; 41 Jerry Reuss; 46 Steve Rosenberg; 36 José Segura; 37 Bobby Thigpen; 45 Carl Willis	Catchers: 72 Carlton Fisk; 5 Ron Karkovice; 27 Mark Salas; Infielders: 20 Mike Diaz; 13 Ozzie Guillén; 15 Donnie Hill; 12 Steve Lyons; 10 Fred Manrique; 24 Carlos Martínez; 14 Russ Morman; 28 Kelly Paris; 30 Sap Randall; 29 Greg Walker; 20 Mike Woodard	Outfielders: 3 Harold Baines; 8 Daryl Boston; 22 Iván Calderón; 17 Dave Gallagher; 1 Lance Johnson; 44 Dan Pasqua; 21 Gary Redus; 7 Kenny Williams; Other batters: 36 Jerry Hairston	Manager: 16 Jim Fregosi; Coaches: 35 Ed Brinkman; 53 Ron Clark; 55 Cal Emery; 49 Dyar Miller; 54 Don Rowe; 51 Walt Williams

== Player stats ==
=== Batting ===
Note: G = Games played; AB = At bats; R = Runs scored; H = Hits; 2B = Doubles; 3B = Triples; HR = Home runs; RBI = Runs batted in; BB = Base on balls; SO = Strikeouts; AVG = Batting average; SB = Stolen bases

Player	G	AB	R	H	2B	3B	HR	RBI	BB	SO	AVG	SB
Harold Baines, DH, RF	158	599	55	166	39	1	13	81	67	109	.277	0
Daryl Boston, OF	105	281	37	61	12	2	15	31	21	44	.217	9
Iván Calderón, OF, DH	73	264	40	56	14	0	14	35	34	66	.212	4
Mike Diaz, 1B, DH	40	152	12	36	6	0	3	12	5	30	.237	0
Carlton Fisk, C	76	253	37	70	8	1	19	50	37	40	.277	0
Dave Gallagher, OF	101	347	59	105	15	3	5	31	29	40	.303	5
Ozzie Guillén, SS	156	566	58	148	16	7	0	39	25	40	.261	25
Jerry Hairston, PH	2	2	0	0	0	0	0	0	0	0	.000	0
Donnie Hill, 2B, 3B, DH	83	221	17	48	6	1	2	20	26	32	.217	3
Lance Johnson, OF	33	124	11	23	4	1	0	6	6	11	.185	6
Ron Karkovice, C	46	115	10	20	4	0	3	9	7	30	.174	4
Steve Lyons, 3B, OF, 2B	146	472	59	127	28	3	5	45	32	59	.269	1
Fred Manrique, 2B, SS	140	345	43	81	10	6	5	37	21	54	.235	6
Carlos Martinez, 3B	17	55	5	9	1	0	0	0	0	12	.164	1
Russ Morman, 1B, LF, DH	40	75	8	18	2	0	0	3	3	17	.240	0
Kelly Paris, 1B, 3B	14	44	6	11	0	0	3	6	0	6	.250	0
Dan Pasqua, OF, 1B, DH	129	422	48	96	16	2	20	50	46	100	.227	1
Sap Randall, 1B, RF, DH	4	12	1	0	0	0	0	1	2	3	.000	0
Gary Redus, OF	77	262	42	69	10	4	6	34	33	52	.263	26
Mark Salas, C	75	196	17	49	7	0	3	9	12	17	.250	0
Greg Walker, 1B	99	377	45	93	22	1	8	42	29	77	.247	0
Kenny Williams, OF, 3B, DH	73	220	18	35	4	2	8	28	10	64	.159	6
Mike Woodard, 2B	18	45	3	6	0	1	0	4	1	5	.133	1
Team totals	161	5449	631	1327	224	35	132	573	446	908	.244	98

=== Pitching ===
Note: W = Wins; L = Losses; ERA = Earned run average; G = Games pitched; GS = Games started; SV = Saves; IP = Innings pitched; H = Hits allowed; R = Runs allowed; ER = Earned runs allowed; HR = Home runs allowed; BB = Walks allowed; K = Strikeouts

Player	W	L	ERA	G	GS	SV	IP	H	R	ER	HR	BB	K
Jeff Bittiger	2	4	4.23	25	7	0	61.2	59	31	29	11	32	33
Joel Davis	0	1	6.75	5	2	0	16.0	21	12	12	4	5	10
John Davis	2	5	6.64	34	1	1	63.2	77	58	47	5	60	37
Shawn Hillegas	3	2	3.15	6	6	0	40.0	30	16	14	4	18	26
Ricky Horton	6	10	4.86	52	9	2	109.1	120	64	59	6	40	28
Barry Jones	2	2	2.42	17	0	1	26.0	15	7	7	3	18	17
Dave LaPoint	10	11	3.40	25	25	0	161.1	151	69	61	10	48	79
Bill Long	8	11	4.03	47	18	2	174.0	187	89	78	21	47	77
Ravelo Manzanillo	0	1	5.79	2	2	0	9.1	7	6	6	1	12	10
Tom McCarthy	2	0	1.38	6	0	1	13.0	9	2	2	0	2	5
Jack McDowell	5	10	3.97	26	26	0	158.2	147	85	70	12	73	84
Donn Pall	0	2	3.45	17	0	0	28.2	39	11	11	1	9	16
Ken Patterson	0	2	4.79	9	2	1	20.2	25	11	11	2	7	8
John Pawlowski	1	0	8.36	6	0	0	14.0	20	14	13	2	3	10
Mélido Pérez	12	10	3.79	32	32	0	197.0	186	105	83	26	72	138
Adam Peterson	0	1	13.50	2	2	0	6.0	6	9	9	0	7	5
Jerry Reuss	13	9	3.44	32	29	0	183.0	183	79	70	15	44	73
Steve Rosenberg	0	1	4.30	33	0	1	46.0	53	22	22	5	19	28
Jose Segura	0	0	13.50	4	0	0	8.2	19	17	13	1	8	2
Bobby Thigpen	5	8	3.30	68	0	34	90.0	96	38	33	6	36	62
Carl Willis	0	0	8.25	6	0	0	12.0	17	12	11	3	8	6
Team totals	71	90	4.12	161	161	43	1439.0	1467	757	659	138	567	754

== Farm system ==
Level	Team	League	Manager
AAA	Vancouver Canadians	Pacific Coast League	Terry Bevington
AA	Birmingham Barons	Southern League	Rico Petrocelli
A	Tampa White Sox	Florida State League	Marv Foley
A	South Bend White Sox	Midwest League	Steve Dillard
A-Short Season	Utica Blue Sox	New York–Penn League	Rick Patterson
Rookie	GCL White Sox	Gulf Coast League	Art Kusnyer
