= 1989 Chicago White Sox season =

1989 Chicago White Sox
- League: American League
- Division: West
- Ballpark: Comiskey Park
- City: Chicago
- Owners: Jerry Reinsdorf
- General managers: Larry Himes
- Managers: Jeff Torborg
- Television: WFLD; SportsChannel Chicago (Gary Thorne, Tom Paciorek)
- Radio: WMAQ (AM) (John Rooney, Wayne Hagin); WTAQ (Frank Diaz, Jose Manuel Flores)

The 1989 Chicago White Sox season was the White Sox's 90th season. They finished with a record of 69–92, anchoring them to the cellar (seventh place) of the American League West, 29.5 games behind the first place Oakland Athletics.

== Offseason ==
=== Potential move to Florida ===
In July 1988, legislators from the State of Illinois narrowly approved a proposal for a new state-financed stadium and a lease deal that would save the team $60 million and kept the White Sox from moving to St. Petersburg, Florida. St. Petersburg had begun construction on an $80 million domed stadium.

The club's principal owners, Jerry Reinsdorf and Eddie Einhorn, had said the team would move to St. Petersburg, Florida, for the 1989 season if the stadium proposal were not approved.

The state Senate in Springfield passed the stadium bill by a 30 to 26 vote about 20 minutes before midnight, then sent it on to the General Assembly, where Gov. James Thompson was involved in political maneuvering on the last day the legislature was in session.

The money for the ball park would come from a 2 percent city hotel-motel tax, estimated to be worth at least $8 million a year. The city would add $5 million annually in revenue-sharing funds, and the state would contribute $5 million in hotel-motel tax revenues.

=== Notable transactions ===
- December 5, 1988: Rich Amaral was drafted by the White Sox from the Chicago Cubs in the 1988 rule 5 draft.
- December 12, 1988: Mike Diaz was released by the White Sox.
- February 10, 1989: Jerry Willard was signed as a free agent with the White Sox.
- March 23, 1989: Kenny Williams was traded by the White Sox to the Detroit Tigers for Eric King.

== Regular season ==
=== Season standings ===
AL West
Team	W	L	Pct.	GB	Home	Road
Oakland Athletics	99	63	.611	—	54‍–‍27	45‍–‍36
Kansas City Royals	92	70	.568	7	55‍–‍26	37‍–‍44
California Angels	91	71	.562	8	52‍–‍29	39‍–‍42
Texas Rangers	83	79	.512	16	45‍–‍36	38‍–‍43
Minnesota Twins	80	82	.494	19	45‍–‍36	35‍–‍46
Seattle Mariners	73	89	.451	26	40‍–‍41	33‍–‍48
Chicago White Sox	69	92	.429	29½	35‍–‍45	34‍–‍47

=== Record vs. opponents ===
1989 American League record Sources:
Team	BAL	BOS	CAL	CWS	CLE	DET	KC	MIL	MIN	NYY	OAK	SEA	TEX	TOR
Baltimore	—	6–7	6–6	6–6	7–6	10–3	6–6	7–6	4–8	8–5	5–7	6–6	9–3	7–6
Boston	7–6	—	4–8	7–5	8–5	11–2	4–8	6–7	6–6	7–6	7–5	5–7	6–6	5–8
California	6–6	8–4	—	8–5	5–7	11–1	4–9	7–5	11–2	6–6	5–8	7–6	6–7	7–5
Chicago	6–6	5–7	5–8	—	7–5	4–8	6–7	10–2	5–8	5–6	5–8	7–6	3–10	1–11
Cleveland	6–7	5–8	7–5	5–7	—	5–8	8–4	3–10	5–7	9–4	2–10	6–6	7–5	5–8
Detroit	3–10	2–11	1–11	8–4	8–5	—	6–6	6–7	5–7	6–7	4–8	4–8	4–8	2–11
Kansas City	6–6	8–4	9–4	7–6	4–8	6–6	—	8–4	7–6	6–6	7–6	9–4	8–5	7–5
Milwaukee	6–7	7–6	5–7	2–10	10–3	7–6	4–8	—	9–3	8–5	5–7	7–5	5–7	6–7
Minnesota	8–4	6–6	2–11	8–5	7–5	7–5	6–7	3–9	—	6–6	6–7	7–6	5–8	9–3
New York	5–8	6–7	6–6	6–5	4–9	7–6	6–6	5–8	6–6	—	3–9	8–4	5–7	7–6
Oakland	7–5	5–7	8–5	8–5	10–2	8–4	6–7	7–5	7–6	9–3	—	9–4	8–5	7–5
Seattle	6–6	7–5	6–7	6–7	6–6	8–4	4–9	5–7	6–7	4–8	4–9	—	6–7	5–7
Texas	3–9	6–6	7–6	10–3	5–7	8–4	5–8	7–5	8–5	7–5	5–8	7–6	—	5–7
Toronto	6–7	8–5	5–7	11–1	8–5	11–2	5–7	7–6	3–9	6–7	5–7	7–5	7–5	—

=== 1989 Opening Day lineup ===
- Ozzie Guillén, SS
- Dave Gallagher, CF
- Harold Baines, DH
- Iván Calderón, RF
- Greg Walker, 1B
- Carlton Fisk, C
- Dan Pasqua, LF
- Steve Lyons, 2B
- Eddie Williams, 3B
- Jerry Reuss, P

=== Notable transactions ===
- May 8, 1989: Domingo Jean was signed as an amateur free agent by the White Sox.
- June 5, 1989: Frank Thomas was selected by the White Sox in the 1st round (7th pick) of the 1989 Major League Baseball draft.
- July 1, 1989: Richard Dotson was signed as a free agent by the White Sox.
- July 29, 1989: Harold Baines and Fred Manrique were traded by the White Sox to the Texas Rangers for Sammy Sosa, Wilson Álvarez, and Scott Fletcher.

=== Roster ===
1989 Chicago White Sox
Roster
Pitchers: 35 Jeff Bittiger; 31 John Davis; 34 Richard Dotson; 56 Wayne Edwards; 27,54 Jack Hardy; 27,52 Greg Hibbard; 45,57 Shawn Hillegas; 50 Barry Jones; 36 Eric King; 47 Bill Long; 49 Tom McCarthy; 30 Donn Pall; 38,34 Ken Patterson; 33 Mélido Pérez; 43 Adam Peterson; 41 Jerry Reuss; 46 Steve Rosenberg; 54 José Segura; 37 Bobby Thigpen	Catchers: 72 Carlton Fisk; 20 Ron Karkovice; 7 Matt Merullo; Infielders: 7 Scott Fletcher; 13 Ozzie Guillén; 42 Ron Kittle; 12 Steve Lyons; 14 Fred Manrique; 24 Carlos Martínez; 26 Russ Morman; 28 Billy Jo Robidoux; 15 Jeff Schaefer; 21 Robin Ventura; 29 Greg Walker; 25 Eddie Williams	Outfielders: 8 Daryl Boston; 22 Iván Calderón; 17 Dave Gallagher; 1 Lance Johnson; 44 Dan Pasqua; 25 Sammy Sosa; Other batters: 3 Harold Baines; 15 Jerry Hairston	Manager: 10 Jeff Torborg; Coaches: 18 Terry Bevington (Third Base); 5 Ron Clark (First Base); 32 Sammy Ellis (Pitching); 6 Walt Hriniak (Hitting); 53 Dave LaRoche (Bullpen)

== Player stats ==
=== Batting ===
Note: G = Games played; AB = At bats; R = Runs scored; H = Hits; 2B = Doubles; 3B = Triples; HR = Home runs; RBI = Runs batted in; BB = Base on balls; SO = Strikeouts; AVG = Batting average; SB = Stolen bases

Player	G	AB	R	H	2B	3B	HR	RBI	BB	SO	AVG	SB
Harold Baines, DH, RF	96	333	55	107	20	1	13	56	60	52	.321	0
Daryl Boston, OF	101	218	34	55	3	4	5	23	24	31	.252	7
Iván Calderón, OF, DH, 1B	157	622	83	178	34	9	14	87	43	94	.286	7
Carlton Fisk, C	103	375	47	110	25	2	13	68	36	60	.293	1
Scott Fletcher, 2B, SS	59	232	30	63	11	1	1	21	26	19	.272	1
Dave Gallagher, OF	161	601	74	160	22	2	1	46	46	79	.266	5
Ozzie Guillén, SS	155	597	63	151	20	8	1	54	15	48	.253	36
Jerry Hairston, PH	3	3	0	1	0	0	0	0	0	0	.333	0
Lance Johnson, OF	50	180	28	54	8	2	0	16	17	24	.300	16
Ron Karkovice, C	71	182	21	48	9	2	3	24	10	56	.264	0
Ron Kittle, 1B, DH, LF	51	169	26	51	10	0	11	37	22	42	.302	0
Steve Lyons, 2B, 1B, 3B, OF	140	443	51	117	21	3	2	50	35	68	.264	9
Fred Manrique, 2B	65	187	23	56	13	1	2	30	8	30	.299	0
Carlos Martinez, 3B, 1B, LF	109	350	44	105	22	0	5	32	21	57	.300	4
Matt Merullo, C	31	81	5	18	1	0	1	8	6	14	.222	0
Russ Morman, 1B	37	58	5	13	2	0	0	8	6	16	.224	1
Dan Pasqua, OF, DH	73	246	26	61	9	1	11	47	25	58	.248	1
Billy Jo Robidoux, 1B	16	39	2	5	2	0	0	1	4	9	.128	0
Jeff Schaefer, SS, 2B, 3B	15	10	2	1	0	0	0	0	0	2	.100	1
Sammy Sosa, OF	33	99	19	27	5	0	3	10	11	27	.273	7
Robin Ventura, 3B	16	45	5	8	3	0	0	7	8	6	.178	0
Greg Walker, 1B, DH	77	233	25	49	14	0	5	26	23	50	.210	0
Eddie Williams, 3B	66	201	25	55	8	0	3	10	18	31	.274	1
Team totals	161	5504	693	1493	262	36	94	661	464	873	.271	97

=== Pitching ===
Note: W = Wins; L = Losses; ERA = Earned run average; G = Games pitched; GS = Games started; SV = Saves; IP = Innings pitched; H = Hits allowed; R = Runs allowed; ER = Earned runs allowed; HR = Home runs allowed; BB = Walks allowed; K = Strikeouts

Player	W	L	ERA	G	GS	SV	IP	H	R	ER	HR	BB	K
Jeff Bittiger	0	1	6.52	2	1	0	9.2	9	7	7	2	6	7
Wayne Edwards	0	0	3.68	7	0	0	7.1	7	3	3	1	3	9
John Davis	0	1	4.50	4	0	1	6.0	5	4	3	2	2	5
Richard Dotson	3	7	3.88	17	17	0	99.2	112	51	43	8	44	55
Jack Hardy	0	0	6.57	5	0	0	12.1	14	9	9	1	5	4
Greg Hibbard	6	7	3.21	23	23	0	137.1	142	58	49	5	41	55
Shawn Hillegas	7	11	4.74	50	13	3	119.2	132	67	63	12	55	76
Barry Jones	3	2	2.37	22	0	1	30.1	22	12	8	2	8	17
Eric King	9	10	3.39	25	25	0	159.1	144	69	60	13	65	72
Bill Long	5	5	3.92	30	8	1	98.2	101	49	43	8	37	51
Tom McCarthy	1	2	3.51	31	0	0	66.2	72	32	26	8	20	27
Donn Pall	4	5	3.31	53	0	6	87.0	90	35	32	9	22	58
Ken Patterson	6	1	4.52	50	1	0	65.2	64	37	33	11	31	43
Mélido Pérez	11	14	5.01	31	31	0	183.1	187	106	102	23	93	141
Adam Peterson	0	1	15.19	3	2	0	5.1	13	9	9	1	2	3
Jerry Reuss	8	5	5.06	23	19	0	106.2	135	65	60	12	22	27
Steve Rosenberg	4	13	4.94	38	21	0	142.0	148	92	78	14	59	77
Jose Segura	0	1	15.00	7	0	0	6.0	13	11	10	2	4	4
Bobby Thigpen	2	6	3.76	61	0	34	79.0	62	34	33	10	43	47
Team totals	69	92	4.23	161	161	46	1422.0	1472	750	668	144	552	778

== Farm system ==
Level	Team	League	Manager
AAA	Vancouver Canadians	Pacific Coast League	Marv Foley
AA	Birmingham Barons	Southern League	Ken Berry
A	Sarasota White Sox	Florida State League	Tony Franklin
A	South Bend White Sox	Midwest League	Rick Patterson
A-Short Season	Utica Blue Sox	New York–Penn League	Ron Vaughn
Rookie	GCL White Sox	Gulf Coast League	Ed Pebley

LEAGUE CHAMPIONS: Vancouver, Birmingham, South Bend
