= 1986 Chicago White Sox season =

1986 Chicago White Sox
- League: American League
- Division: West
- Ballpark: Comiskey Park
- City: Chicago
- Owners: Jerry Reinsdorf
- President of baseball operations: Ken Harrelson (Note: Harrelson's formal title was executive vice president of baseball operations.)
- General managers: Tom Haller (from June 9)
- Managers: Tony La Russa, Doug Rader, Jim Fregosi
- Television: WFLD; Sportsvision (Don Drysdale, Frank Messer)
- Radio: WMAQ (AM) (Del Crandall, Lorn Brown); WTAQ (Armando Perez Martinez, Frank Diaz)

The 1986 Chicago White Sox season was the 87th season for the Chicago White Sox franchise of Major League Baseball (MLB). They compiled a record of 72–90, finishing in fifth place in the West division of the American League, 20 games behind the first-place California Angels. The team played their home games at Comiskey Park.

== Offseason ==
- November 25, 1985: Wayne Tolleson was traded by the Texas Rangers with Dave Schmidt to the Chicago White Sox for a player to be named later, Ed Correa, and Scott Fletcher. The Chicago White Sox sent Jose Mota (December 11, 1985) to the Texas Rangers to complete the trade.
- December 10, 1985: Bobby Bonilla was drafted by the Chicago White Sox from the Pittsburgh Pirates in the 1985 rule 5 draft.
- December 12, 1985: Ron Hassey was traded by the New York Yankees with Joe Cowley to the Chicago White Sox for Britt Burns, Glen Braxton (minors), and Mike Soper (minors).
- February 13, 1986: Ron Hassey was traded by the Chicago White Sox with Chris Alvarez (minors), Eric Schmidt (minors), and Matt Winters to the New York Yankees for Neil Allen, Scott Bradley, Glen Braxton (minors), and cash.

== Regular season ==
In a game against the Minnesota Twins held on October 4, Greg Gagne of the Twins hit two inside the park home runs in one game.

=== Season standings ===
AL West
| Team | W | L | Pct. | GB | Home | Road |
|---|---|---|---|---|---|---|
| California Angels | 92 | 70 | .568 | — | 50‍–‍32 | 42‍–‍38 |
| Texas Rangers | 87 | 75 | .537 | 5 | 51‍–‍30 | 36‍–‍45 |
| Kansas City Royals | 76 | 86 | .469 | 16 | 45‍–‍36 | 31‍–‍50 |
| Oakland Athletics | 76 | 86 | .469 | 16 | 47‍–‍36 | 29‍–‍50 |
| Chicago White Sox | 72 | 90 | .444 | 20 | 41‍–‍40 | 31‍–‍50 |
| Minnesota Twins | 71 | 91 | .438 | 21 | 43‍–‍38 | 28‍–‍53 |
| Seattle Mariners | 67 | 95 | .414 | 25 | 41‍–‍41 | 26‍–‍54 |

=== Record vs. opponents ===
1986 American League record Sources:
| Team | BAL | BOS | CAL | CWS | CLE | DET | KC | MIL | MIN | NYY | OAK | SEA | TEX | TOR |
|---|---|---|---|---|---|---|---|---|---|---|---|---|---|---|
| Baltimore | — | 4–9 | 6–6 | 9–3 | 4–9 | 1–12 | 6–6 | 6–7 | 8–4 | 5–8 | 5–7 | 6–6 | 5–7 | 8–5 |
| Boston | 9–4 | — | 5–7 | 7–5 | 10–3 | 7–6 | 6–6 | 6–6 | 10–2 | 5–8 | 7–5 | 8–4 | 8–4 | 7–6 |
| California | 6–6 | 7–5 | — | 7–6 | 6–6 | 7–5 | 8–5 | 5–7 | 7–6 | 7–5 | 10–3 | 8–5 | 8–5 | 6–6 |
| Chicago | 3–9 | 5–7 | 6–7 | — | 5–7 | 6–6 | 7–6 | 5–7 | 6–7 | 6–6 | 7–6 | 8–5 | 2–11 | 6–6 |
| Cleveland | 9–4 | 3–10 | 6–6 | 7–5 | — | 4–9 | 8–4 | 8–5 | 6–6 | 5–8 | 10–2 | 9–3 | 6–6 | 3–10–1 |
| Detroit | 12–1 | 6–7 | 5–7 | 6–6 | 9–4 | — | 5–7 | 8–5 | 7–5 | 6–7 | 6–6 | 6–6 | 7–5 | 4–9 |
| Kansas City | 6–6 | 6–6 | 5–8 | 6–7 | 4–8 | 7–5 | — | 6–6 | 6–7 | 4–8 | 8–5 | 5–8 | 8–5 | 5–7 |
| Milwaukee | 7–6 | 6–6 | 7–5 | 7–5 | 5–8 | 5–8 | 6–6 | — | 4–8 | 8–5 | 5–7 | 6–6 | 4–8 | 7–6 |
| Minnesota | 4–8 | 2–10 | 6–7 | 7–6 | 6–6 | 5–7 | 7–6 | 8–4 | — | 4–8 | 6–7 | 6–7 | 6–7 | 4–8 |
| New York | 8–5 | 8–5 | 5–7 | 6–6 | 8–5 | 7–6 | 8–4 | 5–8 | 8–4 | — | 5–7 | 8–4 | 7–5 | 7–6 |
| Oakland | 7–5 | 5–7 | 3–10 | 6–7 | 2–10 | 6–6 | 5–8 | 7–5 | 7–6 | 7–5 | — | 10–3 | 3–10 | 8–4 |
| Seattle | 6–6 | 4–8 | 5–8 | 5–8 | 3–9 | 6–6 | 8–5 | 6–6 | 7–6 | 4–8 | 3–10 | — | 4–9 | 6–6 |
| Texas | 7–5 | 4–8 | 5–8 | 11–2 | 6–6 | 5–7 | 5–8 | 8–4 | 7–6 | 5–7 | 10–3 | 9–4 | — | 5–7 |
| Toronto | 5–8 | 6–7 | 6–6 | 6–6 | 10–3–1 | 9–4 | 7–5 | 6–7 | 8–4 | 6–7 | 4–8 | 6–6 | 7–5 | — |

=== Notable transactions ===
- June 29, 1986: Steve Lyons was traded by the Boston Red Sox to the Chicago White Sox for Tom Seaver.
- July 23, 1986: Bobby Bonilla was traded by the Chicago White Sox to the Pittsburgh Pirates for José DeLeón.
- July 30, 1986: Ron Hassey was traded by the New York Yankees with a player to be named later and Carlos Martinez to the Chicago White Sox for Ron Kittle, Wayne Tolleson, and Joel Skinner. The New York Yankees sent Bill Lindsey (December 24, 1986) to the Chicago White Sox to complete the trade.
- August 12, 1986: Steve Carlton signed as a free agent with the Chicago White Sox.
- August 15, 1986: George Foster was signed as a free agent with the Chicago White Sox.
- August 13, 1986: Craig Grebeck was signed by the Chicago White Sox as an amateur free agent.
- September 7, 1986: George Foster was released by the Chicago White Sox.

== 1986 Opening Day lineup ==
- John Cangelosi, CF
- Wayne Tolleson, 3B
- Harold Baines, RF
- Carlton Fisk, LF
- Ron Kittle, DH
- Greg Walker, 1B
- Tim Hulett, 2B
- Joel Skinner, C
- Ozzie Guillén, SS
- Tom Seaver, P

=== Roster ===
1986 Chicago White Sox
Roster
| Pitchers: 50 Juan Agosto; 33 Neil Allen; 19 Floyd Bannister; 32 Steve Carlton; 45 Bryan Clark; 40 Joe Cowley; 52 Joel Davis; 46 Bill Dawley; 26 José DeLeón; 34 Richard Dotson; 51 Pete Filson; 43 Bob James; 50 Joel McKeon; 30 Gene Nelson; 24 Dave Schmidt; 36 Ray Searage; 41 Tom Seaver; 58 Bobby Thigpen | Catchers: 72 Carlton Fisk; 25 Ron Hassey; 7 Marc Hill; 53 Ron Karkovice; 22 Joel Skinner; Infielders: 37 Dave Cochrane; 12 Julio Cruz; 18 Brian Giles; 13 Ozzie Guillén; 17 Jerry Hairston; 23,32 Tim Hulett; 23 Bryan Little; 14 Russ Morman; 42 Jack Perconte; 1 Wayne Tolleson; 29 Greg Walker | Outfielders: 3 Harold Baines; 26 Bobby Bonilla; 8 Daryl Boston; 25 Scott Bradley; 22 Iván Calderón; 44 John Cangelosi; 47 Rod Craig; 15 George Foster; 42 Ron Kittle; 10 Steve Lyons; 20 Reid Nichols; 1 Kenny Williams; Other batters: 5 Luis Salazar | Manager: 16 Jim Fregosi; 10 Tony La Russa; Coaches: 35 Ed Brinkman; 21 Moe Drabowsky; 18 Dave Duncan; 48 Willie Horton; 15 Art Kusnyer |

== Player stats ==
=== Batting ===
Note: G = Games played; AB = At bats; R = Runs scored; H = Hits; 2B = Doubles; 3B = Triples; HR = Home runs; RBI = Runs batted in; BB = Base on balls; SO = Strikeouts; AVG = Batting average; SB = Stolen bases

| Player | G | AB | R | H | 2B | 3B | HR | RBI | BB | SO | AVG | SB |
|---|---|---|---|---|---|---|---|---|---|---|---|---|
| Harold Baines, RF, DH | 145 | 570 | 72 | 169 | 29 | 2 | 21 | 88 | 38 | 89 | .296 | 2 |
| Bobby Bonilla, OF, 1B | 75 | 234 | 27 | 63 | 10 | 2 | 2 | 26 | 33 | 49 | .269 | 4 |
| Daryl Boston, CF | 56 | 199 | 29 | 53 | 11 | 3 | 5 | 22 | 21 | 33 | .266 | 9 |
| Scott Bradley, DH, OF | 9 | 21 | 3 | 6 | 0 | 0 | 0 | 0 | 1 | 0 | .286 | 0 |
| Iván Calderón, DH, LF | 13 | 33 | 3 | 10 | 2 | 1 | 0 | 2 | 3 | 6 | .303 | 0 |
| John Cangelosi, OF | 137 | 438 | 65 | 103 | 16 | 3 | 2 | 32 | 71 | 61 | .235 | 50 |
| Dave Cochrane, 3B | 19 | 62 | 4 | 12 | 2 | 0 | 1 | 2 | 5 | 22 | .194 | 0 |
| Rod Craig, OF | 10 | 10 | 3 | 2 | 0 | 0 | 0 | 1 | 0 | 2 | .200 | 0 |
| Julio Cruz, 2B | 81 | 209 | 38 | 45 | 2 | 0 | 0 | 19 | 42 | 28 | .215 | 7 |
| Bill Dawley, P, PH | 46 | 2 | 0 | 0 | 0 | 0 | 0 | 0 | 0 | 0 | .000 | 0 |
| Carlton Fisk, C, LF, DH | 125 | 457 | 42 | 101 | 11 | 0 | 14 | 63 | 22 | 92 | .221 | 2 |
| George Foster, LF, DH | 15 | 51 | 2 | 11 | 0 | 2 | 1 | 4 | 3 | 8 | .216 | 0 |
| Brian Giles | 9 | 11 | 0 | 3 | 0 | 0 | 0 | 1 | 0 | 2 | .273 | 0 |
| Ozzie Guillén, SS | 159 | 547 | 58 | 137 | 19 | 4 | 2 | 47 | 12 | 52 | .250 | 8 |
| Jerry Hairston, DH, 1B, OF | 101 | 225 | 32 | 61 | 15 | 0 | 5 | 26 | 26 | 26 | .271 | 0 |
| Ron Hassey, DH, C | 49 | 150 | 22 | 53 | 11 | 1 | 3 | 20 | 22 | 11 | .353 | 0 |
| Marc Hill, C | 22 | 19 | 2 | 3 | 0 | 0 | 0 | 0 | 1 | 3 | .158 | 0 |
| Tim Hulett, 3B, 2B | 150 | 520 | 53 | 120 | 16 | 5 | 17 | 44 | 21 | 91 | .231 | 4 |
| Ron Karkovice, C | 37 | 97 | 13 | 24 | 7 | 0 | 4 | 13 | 9 | 37 | .247 | 1 |
| Ron Kittle, DH, LF | 86 | 296 | 34 | 63 | 11 | 0 | 17 | 48 | 28 | 87 | .213 | 2 |
| Bryan Little, 2B, SS | 20 | 35 | 3 | 6 | 1 | 0 | 0 | 2 | 4 | 4 | .171 | 0 |
| Steve Lyons, OF, 3B | 42 | 123 | 10 | 25 | 2 | 1 | 0 | 6 | 7 | 24 | .203 | 2 |
| Russ Morman, 1B | 49 | 159 | 18 | 40 | 5 | 0 | 4 | 17 | 16 | 36 | .252 | 1 |
| Reid Nichols, OF | 74 | 136 | 9 | 31 | 4 | 0 | 2 | 18 | 11 | 23 | .228 | 5 |
| Jack Perconte, 2B | 24 | 73 | 6 | 16 | 1 | 0 | 0 | 4 | 11 | 10 | .219 | 2 |
| Luis Salazar, DH | 4 | 7 | 1 | 1 | 0 | 0 | 0 | 0 | 1 | 3 | .143 | 0 |
| Joel Skinner, C | 60 | 149 | 17 | 30 | 5 | 1 | 4 | 20 | 9 | 43 | .201 | 1 |
| Wayne Tolleson, 3B, SS | 81 | 260 | 39 | 65 | 7 | 3 | 3 | 29 | 38 | 43 | .250 | 13 |
| Greg Walker, 1B | 78 | 282 | 37 | 78 | 10 | 6 | 13 | 51 | 29 | 44 | .277 | 1 |
| Kenny Williams, OF | 15 | 31 | 2 | 4 | 0 | 0 | 1 | 1 | 1 | 11 | .129 | 1 |
| Team totals | 162 | 5406 | 644 | 1335 | 197 | 34 | 121 | 605 | 487 | 940 | .247 | 115 |

=== Pitching ===
Note: W = Wins; L = Losses; ERA = Earned run average; G = Games pitched; GS = Games started; SV = Saves; IP = Innings pitched; H = Hits allowed; R = Runs allowed; ER = Earned runs allowed; HR = Home runs allowed; BB = Walks allowed; K = Strikeouts

| Player | W | L | ERA | G | GS | SV | IP | H | R | ER | HR | BB | K |
|---|---|---|---|---|---|---|---|---|---|---|---|---|---|
| Juan Agosto | 0 | 2 | 7.71 | 9 | 0 | 0 | 4.2 | 6 | 5 | 4 | 0 | 4 | 3 |
| Neil Allen | 7 | 2 | 3.82 | 22 | 17 | 0 | 113.0 | 101 | 50 | 48 | 8 | 39 | 57 |
| Floyd Bannister | 10 | 14 | 3.54 | 28 | 27 | 0 | 165.1 | 162 | 81 | 65 | 17 | 48 | 92 |
| Steve Carlton | 4 | 3 | 3.69 | 10 | 10 | 0 | 63.1 | 58 | 30 | 26 | 6 | 25 | 40 |
| Bryan Clark | 0 | 0 | 4.50 | 5 | 0 | 0 | 8.0 | 8 | 4 | 4 | 0 | 2 | 5 |
| Joe Cowley | 11 | 11 | 3.88 | 27 | 27 | 0 | 162.1 | 133 | 81 | 70 | 20 | 84 | 132 |
| Joel Davis | 4 | 5 | 4.70 | 19 | 19 | 0 | 105.1 | 115 | 64 | 55 | 9 | 51 | 54 |
| Bill Dawley | 0 | 7 | 3.32 | 46 | 0 | 2 | 97.2 | 91 | 38 | 36 | 10 | 31 | 66 |
| José DeLeón | 4 | 5 | 2.96 | 13 | 13 | 0 | 79.0 | 49 | 30 | 26 | 7 | 42 | 68 |
| Richard Dotson | 10 | 17 | 5.48 | 34 | 34 | 0 | 197.0 | 226 | 125 | 120 | 24 | 71 | 110 |
| Pete Filson | 0 | 1 | 6.17 | 3 | 1 | 0 | 11.2 | 14 | 9 | 8 | 4 | 5 | 4 |
| Bob James | 5 | 4 | 5.25 | 49 | 0 | 14 | 58.1 | 61 | 36 | 34 | 8 | 26 | 32 |
| Joel McKeon | 3 | 1 | 2.45 | 30 | 0 | 1 | 33.0 | 18 | 10 | 9 | 2 | 19 | 18 |
| Gene Nelson | 6 | 6 | 3.85 | 54 | 1 | 6 | 114.2 | 118 | 52 | 49 | 7 | 46 | 70 |
| Dave Schmidt | 3 | 6 | 3.31 | 49 | 1 | 8 | 92.1 | 94 | 37 | 34 | 10 | 34 | 67 |
| Ray Searage | 1 | 0 | 0.62 | 29 | 0 | 0 | 29.0 | 15 | 3 | 2 | 1 | 22 | 26 |
| Tom Seaver | 2 | 6 | 4.38 | 12 | 12 | 0 | 72.0 | 66 | 37 | 35 | 9 | 28 | 31 |
| Bobby Thigpen | 2 | 0 | 1.77 | 20 | 0 | 7 | 35.2 | 26 | 7 | 7 | 1 | 12 | 20 |
| Team totals | 72 | 90 | 3.93 | 162 | 162 | 38 | 1442.1 | 1361 | 699 | 630 | 143 | 589 | 895 |

== Farm system ==
| Level | Team | League | Manager |
|---|---|---|---|
| AAA | Buffalo Bisons | American Association | Jim Marshall |
| AA | Birmingham Barons | Southern League | Tom Haller and Bob Bailey |
| A | Peninsula White Sox | Carolina League | Bob Bailey and Duke Sims |
| A | Appleton Foxes | Midwest League | Duke Sims and Rico Petrocelli |
| Rookie | GCL White Sox | Gulf Coast League | Steve Dillard |
