= Joel Davis (disambiguation) =

Joel Davis may refer to:

- Joel Davis (born 1965), American baseball player
- Joel Davis (author), American author
- Joel Davis (neo-Nazi), Australian neo-Nazi
