= Major League Baseball on Fox Television Stations =

The following refers to the history of Major League Baseball coverage on local Fox affiliated stations as opposed to the national broadcasts on the Fox Broadcasting Company beginning in 1996.

== Fox's relationship with baseball before 1996 ==
KTTV 11, which has been Fox's owned-and-operated station in Los Angeles, California since the network's launch in 1986, carried Los Angeles Dodgers baseball games since the team's move from Brooklyn, New York in 1958 (with exception of a brief pause from 1993 to 1995). The station aired road games beginning in the late 1970s with the home games on the subscription/pay-per-view service Dodgervision; these road games aired on the station until 1992, when KTLA began airing the road games beginning with the 1993 season.

Fox's owned-and-operated Chicago affiliate, WFLD 32 acquired the rights to broadcast Major League Baseball games from the Chicago White Sox in 1968, assuming the contract from WGN-TV. Under the initial deal, WFLD carried White Sox games until 1972, when the team returned to WGN through a joint arrangement with WSNS-TV that lasted through the 1980 season and exclusively during the 1981 season; WFLD reassumed Sox game rights in 1982, carrying most of the team's non-cable games. In October 1988, the station filed a lawsuit against the White Sox club to terminate its television contract with the team, which was set to last through 1991, accusing team owners Jerry Reinsdorf and Eddie Einhorn of "gutting and stripmining the[...] team of salary investment, player quality and fan goodwill", which resulted in a decline in viewership for the games and profit losses for the station on the contract (WFLD's profits from the telecasts slid from $1.5 million profit in 1985 to a loss of $1.4 million in 1988, resulting in the rights fees costing four times more than the accrued revenue; ratings during that three-year period also dropped from a 5.1 share in 1985 to a 1.7 in August 1988) as well as breached advertising agreements with the Chicagoland Dodge Dealers consortium. Following an out-of-court settlement between WFLD station management and the Sox, on September 14, 1989, the White Sox announced that it would move its local television broadcasts back to WGN-TV beginning with the 1990 season.

Another original charter Fox affiliate, KMSP 9 out of Minneapolis, Minnesota carried the Minnesota Twins from 1979-1988 and again from 1998-2002, when it was then affiliated with UPN. WTXF 29 out of Philadelphia, which became an owned-and-operated Fox station in 1995, aired Philadelphia Phillies games from 1983-1992.

KTVU 2 obtained the rights to televise San Francisco Giants Major League Baseball games in 1961, three years after the team relocated to the Bay Area from New York City. After the move, the Giants initially opted against televising their games to encourage game attendance by Bay Area residents and tourists. When channel 2 became the Giants' television partner, it was only permitted to televise the team's road games against the Los Angeles Dodgers until 1965, when the station began airing additional regular season and exhibition games (KTVU's relationship with the Giants extended to the franchise's ownership, as Cox Enterprises owned a 10% stake in the Giants during the latter years of the broadcast contract). KTVU eventually began sharing the local television rights to the Giants with SportsChannel Bay Area (now NBC Sports Bay Area, in which the Giants had purchased a 30% minority interest in December 2007) when the regional sports network launched in July 1991. Channel 2 lost the local over-the-air telecast rights to the Giants following the 2007 season when the broadcast television contract was taken over by San Jose-based NBC owned-and-operated station KNTV (channel 11). KTVU wouldn't become an owned-and-operated Fox station until 2014.

== MLB coverage on other Fox-owned outlets ==
=== Fox owned and operated television stations ===
Team	Station	Years of broadcast rights
Boston Red Sox	WFXT 25	2000–2002
Chicago White Sox	WFLD 32	1968–1972; 1982–1989
Detroit Tigers	WJBK 2	1953–1977; 2007
Los Angeles Dodgers	KTTV 11	1958–1992
New York Yankees	WNYW 5	1999–2001
