= Greg Hibbard =

American baseball player and coach (born 1964)

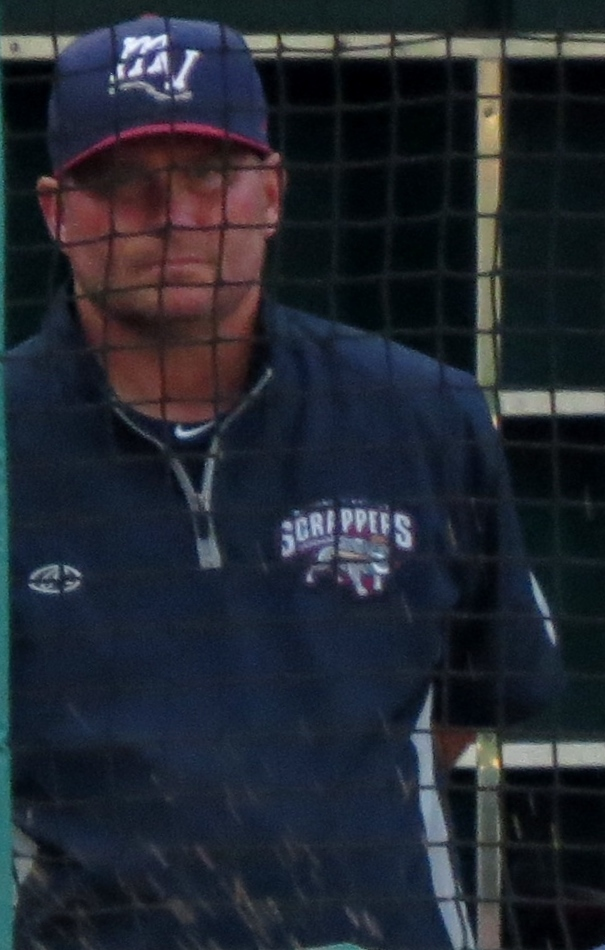
- Hibbard with the Mahoning Valley Scrappers in 2015
- Pitcher
- Born: September 13, 1964 (age 61); New Orleans, Louisiana, U.S.
- Batted: Left Threw: Left

MLB debut
- May 31, 1989, for the Chicago White Sox

Last MLB appearance
- June 23, 1994, for the Seattle Mariners

MLB statistics
- Win–loss record: 57–50
- Earned run average: 4.05
- Strikeouts: 408
- Stats at Baseball Reference

Teams
- Chicago White Sox (1989–1992); Chicago Cubs (1993); Seattle Mariners (1994)

James Gregory Hibbard (born September 13, 1964) is an American former professional baseball pitcher who played in Major League Baseball (MLB) from 1989–1994.

== Playing career ==
=== Amateur career ===
Hibbard attended Harrison Central High School near Lyman, Mississippi, then Mississippi Gulf Coast Junior College, where he played baseball. The Houston Astros selected him in the 8th round of the 1984 MLB draft, but he decided instead to transfer to the University of Alabama. In two years playing for the Alabama Crimson Tide, he had a 13–6 win–loss record and 3.06 earned run average (ERA).

=== Kansas City Royals ===
The Kansas City Royals drafted Hibbard in the 16th round of the 1986 MLB draft. The Royals later traded him with Chuck Mount, John Davis, and Mélido Pérez to the Chicago White Sox for Floyd Banister and Dave Cochrane.

=== Chicago White Sox ===
From 1989 to 1992, Hibbard had a 41–34 record with the White Sox. His best season came in 1990, when he went 14–9 with a 3.16 ERA. Despite throwing 211 innings, he struck out just 92 batters. Hibbard only made 6 relief appearances with the White Sox but did pick up his only career save. On August 1, 1992, Hibbard threw 4 shutout innings to nail down a 8–1 White Sox win over the Seattle Mariners, saving the win for starter Kirk McCaskill.

=== Chicago Cubs ===
The Florida Marlins selected Hibbard with the 12th pick in the 1992 expansion draft. Florida traded him the same day to the Chicago Cubs for Alex Arias and Gary Scott. In his lone season with the Cubs, Hibbard had a 15–11 record.

=== Seattle Mariners ===
Hibbard signed a three-year, $6.75 million contract with the Mariners in January 1994. His first season with the club was cut short due to a shoulder issue. He went 1–5 with a 6.69 ERA. Hibbard did not pitch for Seattle again, as the chronic shoulder issues kept him from returning to the majors. He officially retired from baseball in 1997.

== Post-playing career ==
Hibbard led youth baseball camps at Mississippi Gulf Coast Community College in the 1990s.

Hibbard became the pitching coach of the Joliet Slammers in 2002. He was a pitching coach in the Cleveland Indians minor league system from 2003 to 2015, then coached in the Texas Rangers system from 2016 to 2019.
