= Ron Kittle =

American baseball player (born 1958)

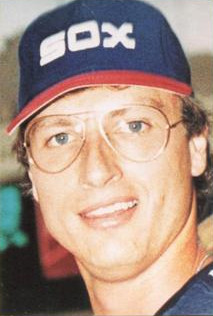
- Kittle in 1983
- Left fielder / Designated hitter
- Born: January 5, 1958 (age 68); Gary, Indiana, U.S.
- Batted: Right Threw: Right

MLB debut
- September 2, 1982, for the Chicago White Sox

Last MLB appearance
- August 13, 1991, for the Chicago White Sox

MLB statistics
- Batting average: .239
- Home runs: 176
- Runs batted in: 460
- Stats at Baseball Reference

Teams
- Chicago White Sox (1982–1986); New York Yankees (1986–1987); Cleveland Indians (1988); Chicago White Sox (1989–1990); Baltimore Orioles (1990); Chicago White Sox (1991)

Career highlights and awards
- All-Star (1983); AL Rookie of the Year (1983)

Ronald Dale Kittle (born January 5, 1958) is an American former left fielder and designated hitter in Major League Baseball (MLB). He was known for his home run hitting power, and was named the 1983 AL Rookie of the Year. Kittle played for the Chicago White Sox (1982–1986, 1989, 1991), New York Yankees (1986–87), Cleveland Indians (1988) and Baltimore Orioles (1990). He batted and threw right-handed. Kittle was also a manager for the minor league Schaumburg Flyers.

== Career ==
The son of a steelworker, Kittle planned to work with his dad after high school, complete with being given his own ironworkers apprentice union card after graduating. However, he was enticed to seek out a tryout camp that was being held in La Porte, Indiana by the Los Angeles Dodgers. An ideal showing from the 18-year-old eventually led to scouts from the team signing him to a contract in 1976, and he would go to play with baseball in Clinton, Iowa. On his first baserunning play trying to score a run, he broke his neck when the catcher landed on him. For the rest of the year, he tried to play on what later diagnosed as a broken neck, complete with three crushed vertebrae and a cracked spinal cord. He had his discs fused while having his spine stabilized. For the next couple of years, he served as an ironworker while trying to build his body back up, trying to defy the expectations of his doctors that said he would never play baseball again (due to his injury, he could no longer hit from both sides of the plate).

A few years later, he took a suggestion to play summer ball, doing so with the American Hellenic Educational Progressive Association. One of his towering home runs went far enough from the park to land on Interstate 294, "500-plus feet away". Bill Veeck, then owner of the White Sox, heard about the home run and gave him a tryout. He signed with the White Sox in September 1978.

Kittle hit 50 homers in the minor leagues with the Edmonton Trappers and has his jersey retired in Edmonton at Telus Field. He was voted winner of 1982's Pacific Coast League Most Valuable Player Award. He hit ninety home runs in the minors combined from the span of 1981 to 1982. He made his MLB debut at nearly 25 years old in September 1982. Kittle was a popular player on the 1983 "winning ugly" Chicago White Sox when they won 99 games and made their first playoff appearance since the 1959 World Series. That season, Kittle was selected an All-Star and won Rookie of the Year honors after hitting 35 home runs (club record for a rookie) and 100 RBI.

Kittle maintained his home run power, but after 1983 his batting average declined and his strikeouts increased. Kittle left the White Sox after 1986 and played part of 1986 before being traded midway through a game to the New York Yankees; he played the ensuing 1987 season with them. Kittle then played 1988 with the Cleveland Indians. He briefly returned again to the White Sox in 1990, sharing playing time at first base with Carlos Martínez. He batted .245 with 16 homers and 43 RBI but struck out 77 times in 277 at-bats through the first four months of that season.

Kittle was acquired by the Baltimore Orioles from the White Sox for Phil Bradley on July 30, 1990. He was resentful of the trade which brought forth the possibility of Frank Thomas being promoted from the minors. In need of a right-handed power hitter, the Orioles received a player with a $550,000 salary as opposed to the $1.15 million that Bradley was earning. Baltimore general manager Roland Hemond was criticized by the Daily Press for bringing on too many ex-White Sox like Kittle, Greg Walker, Kevin Hickey, Tim Hulett and Dave Gallagher. He became a free agent again in the off-season when the Orioles, who had earlier signed Dwight Evans, elected not to exercise the option on his contract on December 15, 1990.

He returned to the White Sox again for the 1991 season. On a pitch during the season, he swung on it and blacked out. A doctor's examination found that if he kept trying to play, he would run the risk of paralysis. Wanting to see his children grow up with an able-bodied dad, he elected to retire in August of that year. Kittle appeared in 843 games over the course of his 10–year MLB career. He recorded 176 home runs and 460 runs batted in.

== Managerial career ==
In 1998, Kittle was hired as the first manager of the non-affiliated minor league Schaumburg Flyers of the Northern League. During the early years of the Flyers franchise, Kittle did a series of TV commercials to promote the team, using the gimmick "Ma Kittle," where he played both himself and his "Ma Kittle." The ads were successful at sparking some initial interest in the team as the Flyers hoped to steal away fans from the nearby Kane County Cougars, then a Florida Marlins Class A team. The ad mimicked the highly successful Converse ads where Larry Johnson starred as both himself and "Grandmama." Kittle resigned his position in 2001.
