= Dave Cochrane (baseball) =

American baseball player (born 1963)

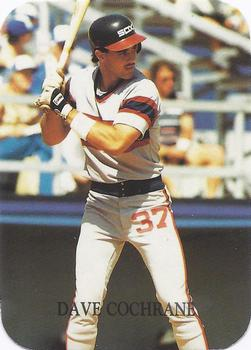
- Cochrane in a 1987 baseball card
- Utility player
- Born: January 31, 1963 (age 63); Riverside, California, U.S.
- Batted: Switch Threw: Right

MLB debut
- September 2, 1986, for the Chicago White Sox

Last MLB appearance
- July 30, 1992, for the Seattle Mariners

MLB statistics
- Batting average: .235
- Home runs: 8
- Runs batted in: 43
- Stats at Baseball Reference

Teams
- Chicago White Sox (1986); Seattle Mariners (1989–1992)

David Carter Cochrane (born January 31, 1963) is an American former professional utility player for the Seattle Mariners and Chicago White Sox of Major League Baseball (MLB).

Cochrane attended Troy High School in Fullerton, California. He was drafted by the New York Mets in the fourth round of the 1981 Major League Baseball draft. He signed professionally, forgoing an offer to play for the Arizona State Sun Devils. The Mets traded him to the White Sox for Tom Paciorek in 1985.

Cochrane was a September call-up in 1986, batting .189 in his only major league season with the White Sox. In December 1987, Chicago traded him and Floyd Bannister to the Kansas City Royals for pitchers John Davis, Mélido Pérez, Chuck Mount, and Greg Hibbard. Two months later, Kansas City traded him to Seattle for minor league pitcher Ken Spratke.

Cochrane returned to the majors in May 1989. He hit a game-winning home run against Kevin Brown on June 1. In 1992, his final season in the majors, Cochrane played every field position for the Mariners except pitcher and center field. Ken Griffey Jr. held down this position.

Cochrane's son, Steve, played college baseball for Georgia Southern University and one season of Minor League Baseball with the Mariners.
