= Floyd Bannister =

American baseball player (born 1955)

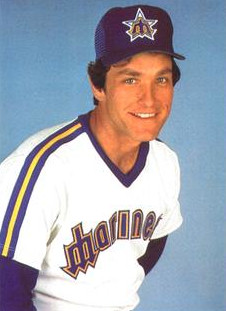
- Bannister in 1981
- Pitcher
- Born: June 10, 1955 (age 71); Pierre, South Dakota, U.S.
- Batted: Left Threw: Left

Professional debut
- MLB: April 19, 1977, for the Houston Astros
- NPB: April 8, 1990, for the Yakult Swallows

Last appearance
- NPB: June 14, 1990, for the Yakult Swallows
- MLB: August 10, 1992, for the Texas Rangers

MLB statistics
- Win–loss record: 134–143
- Earned run average: 4.06
- Strikeouts: 1,723

NPB statistics
- Win–loss record: 3–2
- Earned run average: 4.04
- Strikeouts: 31
- Stats at Baseball Reference

Teams
- Houston Astros (1977–1978); Seattle Mariners (1979–1982); Chicago White Sox (1983–1987); Kansas City Royals (1988–1989); Yakult Swallows (1990); California Angels (1991); Texas Rangers (1992)

Career highlights and awards
- All-Star (1982); AL strikeout leader (1982)

Member of the National College

Baseball Hall of Fame
- Induction: 2008

Floyd Franklin Bannister (born June 10, 1955) is an American former professional baseball left-handed pitcher, who played in Major League Baseball (MLB) for the Houston Astros, Seattle Mariners, Chicago White Sox, Kansas City Royals, California Angels, and Texas Rangers from 1977 to 1992. He also played for the Yakult Swallows of Nippon Professional Baseball in 1990. Bannister was the first overall pick by Houston in the 1976 MLB draft. With the Mariners in 1982, he was an All-Star and led the American League in strikeouts.

== Amateur career ==
In 1973, as a high school senior, Bannister led his Kennedy Catholic High School team in Burien, Washington, to a state championship, with a 15–0 record and allowing no earned runs. He was selected in the third round (71st overall) of the 1973 Major League Baseball draft by the Oakland Athletics, but he did not sign.

Bannister then played college baseball for the Arizona State Sun Devils, where he was named college player of the year by The Sporting News as a junior. He was later inducted into the Sun Devils Hall of Fame and College Baseball Hall of Fame.

In 1975, Bannister pitched for the U.S. collegiate national team.

== Professional career ==
The Houston Astros selected Bannister with the first overall pick of the 1976 Major League Baseball draft. He signed with the team, earning a $100,000 bonus.

After pitching just seven games in the minors in 1976, Bannister opened the 1977 season with the Astros. He appeared in 24 games (23 starts), going 8–9 with a 4.04 earned run average (ERA). He finished fourth in National League Rookie of the Year voting. In 1978, he suffered tonsillitis in spring training and was later demoted to a relief role, before Houston traded him to the Seattle Mariners for shortstop Craig Reynolds on December 8, 1978.

Bannister spent four years in Seattle, with his last year there being his best. In 1982, Bannister started for Seattle on Opening Day and finished the season 12–13 with a 3.43 ERA in 35 starts and was selected for his only All-Star Game. He also led the American League (AL) with 209 strikeouts, a career best.

On December 13, 1982, Bannister signed a five-year, $4.5 million contract with the Chicago White Sox as a free agent. During his time in Chicago, he averaged 13 wins per season. In his first season with the White Sox, he lost nine of his first 12 decisions before winning 13 more games. He went 16–10 with a career-low 3.35 ERA in 34 starts, helping the team win the AL West. In his only playoff start, Bannister lost Game 2 of the AL Championship Series. In 1983 and 1985, he led the AL in strikeouts per nine innings with averages of 8.0 and 8.5, respectively. He also tossed a career-high 11 complete games in 1987, his last season with the White Sox. During the season, he agreed to a two-year, $1.2 million contract extension.

On December 10, 1987, Bannister and infielder Dave Cochrane were traded to the Kansas City Royals for pitchers John Davis, Mélido Pérez, Chuck Mount, and Greg Hibbard. Bannister had another solid season in 1988, going 12–13 with a 4.33 ERA in 31 starts. However, in June 1989, he suffered a shoulder injury, which ended his season. Finding no takers as a free agent, Bannister went to Japan in 1990, playing for the Yakult Swallows. In nine starts for the Swallows, he was 3–2 with a 4.04 ERA.

On December 13, 1990, Bannister signed a $250,000 contract with the California Angels, where he was converted into a reliever. He had a 3.96 ERA in 16 relief appearances with the Angels before being released on August 29. After one season with the Texas Rangers in 1992, Bannister was released in August, ending his professional career.

== Player profile ==
Armed with a strong fastball and big breaking curveball, Bannister averaged 6.49 strikeouts per nine innings in his career but also shuffled between six different teams in 15 years in the majors. He gave up more than 30 home runs in four different seasons. Coaches, including Don Drysdale and Dave Duncan, questioned his mental approach to pitching. Bannister later said he would have been more successful if he threw more curveballs.

Bannister compiled a 134–143 record with a 4.06 ERA in 431 games (363 starts). He had 62 complete games in his career, including 16 shutouts. He amassed 1,723 strikeouts over his career. He held several records for the nascent Mariners franchise, including career strikeouts and complete games, that several pitchers have since surprised.

Bannister was inducted into the College Baseball Hall of Fame in 2008. In 2026, he was named one of the 50 greatest Mariners players.

== Personal life ==
Bannister was born in Pierre, South Dakota, then his family moved to the Seattle area when his father began working for Boeing.

Bannister and his wife reside near Phoenix, Arizona. They have three children, all of whom pitched competitively. Brian Bannister pitched for five seasons in the majors for the New York Mets and the Kansas City Royals. Brett Bannister pitched for the USC Trojans and played one season in the minors after being drafted by the Mariners. Cory Bannister pitched at Stanford. Bannister was teammates with future brother-in-law Greg Cochran at Arizona State. Cochran later reached Triple-A.

Bannister manages Brian's professional photography studio in Phoenix. He also has an indoor training facility in a commercial building he owns in Phoenix.

== See also ==
- List of Major League Baseball annual strikeout leaders

| Preceded by Glenn Abbott | Opening Day starting pitcher for the Seattle Mariners; 1982 | Succeeded by Gaylord Perry |
