= Eddie Williams (baseball) =

American baseball player (born 1964)

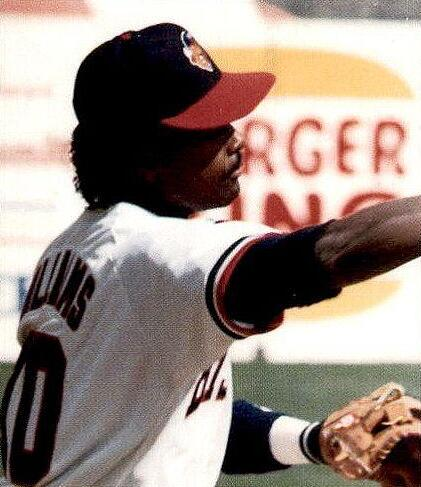
- Williams with the Buffalo Bisons c. 1987
- First baseman / Third baseman
- Born: November 1, 1964 (age 61); Shreveport, Louisiana, U.S.
- Batted: Right Threw: Right

Professional debut
- MLB: April 18, 1986, for the Cleveland Indians
- NPB: April 7, 1991, for the Fukuoka Daiei Hawks

Last appearance
- NPB: June 27, 1991, for the Fukuoka Daiei Hawks
- MLB: May 27, 1998, for the San Diego Padres

MLB statistics
- Batting average: .252
- Home runs: 39
- Runs batted in: 150

NPB statistics
- Batting average: .252
- Home runs: 5
- Runs batted in: 16

KBO statistics
- Batting average: .248
- Home runs: 12
- Runs batted in: 26
- Stats at Baseball Reference

Teams
- Cleveland Indians (1986–1988); Chicago White Sox (1989); San Diego Padres (1990); Fukuoka Daiei Hawks (1991); San Diego Padres (1994–1995); Detroit Tigers (1996); Los Angeles Dodgers (1997); Pittsburgh Pirates (1997); San Diego Padres (1997–1998); Hyundai Unicorns (2000)

Edward Laquan Williams (born November 1, 1964) is an American former professional baseball first baseman and third baseman.

== Career ==
Drafted by the New York Mets in the 1st round of the 1983 Major League Baseball draft out of Herbert Hoover High School in San Diego, California, Williams made his major league debut with the Cleveland Indians on April 18, 1986, and appeared in his final game on May 27, 1998, for the San Diego Padres. He also played one season in the Nippon Professional Baseball (NPB) for the Fukuoka Daiei Hawks in 1991, and one season in South Korea's KBO League for the Hyundai Unicorns in 2000.
