= Wayne Edwards (baseball) =

American baseball player (born 1964)

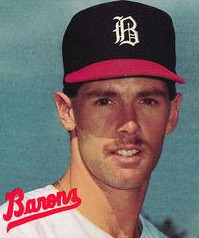
- Edwards in 1988
- Pitcher
- Born: March 7, 1964 (age 62); Burbank, California, U.S.
- Batted: Left Threw: Left

MLB debut
- September 11, 1989, for the Chicago White Sox

Last MLB appearance
- May 25, 1991, for the Chicago White Sox

MLB statistics
- Win–loss record: 5–5
- Earned run average: 3.37
- Strikeouts: 84
- Stats at Baseball Reference

Teams
- Chicago White Sox (1989–1991)

Wayne Maurice Edwards (born March 7, 1964) is an American former professional baseball pitcher for the Chicago White Sox of the Major League Baseball (MLB). He was drafted by the White Sox in the 10th round of the 1985 Major League Baseball draft. He was the drummer with V.I.E.W., an alternative rock band whose lead vocalist was fellow White Sox pitcher Jack McDowell. His father Wayne Sr. was the drummer with The Hondells. He is a 2007 Azusa Pacific University Athletics Hall of Fame inductee.
