= Justice Waits =

2005 book by Joel Davis

Justice Waits: The UC Davis Sweetheart Murders
- Author: Joel Davis
- Publisher: Callister Press
- Publication date: 27 July 2005
- Pages: 218
- ISBN: 097416030X

Justice Waits: The UC Davis Sweetheart Murders is a 2005 biography by Joel Davis about the 1980 murders of two UC Davis freshmen, John Harold Riggins and Sabrina Marie Gonsalves. Dubbed "The Sweetheart Murders", the case remained cold until August 27, 2002, when incriminating DNA evidence obtained from a blanket in the kidnappers' van proved that convicted child molester Richard Hirschfield was involved in the murders.

Davis, who had attended school with Riggins, persisted to persuade the police to re-examine the case.
