= Kelly Paris =

American baseball player (1957–2019)

- Third baseman
- Born: October 17, 1957; Encino, California, U.S.
- Died: May 27, 2019 (aged 61); Belmont, North Carolina, U.S.
- Batted: Right Threw: Right

MLB debut
- September 1, 1982, for the St. Louis Cardinals

Last MLB appearance
- August 18, 1988, for the Chicago White Sox

MLB statistics
- Batting average: .217
- Home runs: 3
- Runs batted in: 14
- Stats at Baseball Reference

Teams
- St. Louis Cardinals (1982); Cincinnati Reds (1983); Baltimore Orioles (1985–1986); Chicago White Sox (1988)

Kelly Jay Paris (October 17, 1957 – May 27, 2019) was an American professional baseball player who played in the Major Leagues with the St. Louis Cardinals, Cincinnati Reds, Baltimore Orioles, and the Chicago White Sox. He played as a third baseman and shortstop.

== Career ==
Paris was born in Encino, California, and attended William Howard Taft High School in Woodland Hills, Los Angeles. While at Taft, he was teammates with future star and hall of fame player Robin Yount, NFL player and head coach Jeff Fisher and NBA referee Bill Spooner.

He was drafted by the St. Louis Cardinals in the second round of the 1975 Major League Baseball draft on June 3, 1975, and made his major league debut on September 1, 1982, with the Cardinals. On March 31, 1983, Paris was traded to the Cincinnati Reds for Jim Strichek. It was with the Reds that Paris played the majority of his Major League games. In November 1983, the Chicago White Sox purchased his contract from Cincinnati. He was released at the end of spring training and signed a minor league deal with the Pittsburgh Pirates and spent the season with their Triple-A club, the Hawaii Islanders. He then signed with the Baltimore Orioles and later spent time playing in the minor league system of the White Sox and then the Kansas City Royals before finishing his pro career with the Mexico City Reds of the Mexican League.

In 1976, while playing for the Johnson City Cardinals, Kelly and his older brother Bret, achieved what is believed to be a first in professional baseball. The two brothers hit home runs for the same team in the same inning.

All three of Paris' career major league home runs were hit in 1988 in 44 at-bats while a member of the Chicago White Sox.

He died on May 27, 2019, after suffering from lung cancer.

== Return to MLB ==
After playing with Cincinnati, Paris spent the next part of his career playing for the Rochester Red Wings, the Triple-A team for the Baltimore Orioles at the time. It was during his time with the Reds that Paris developed a drinking problem, which led to him ending up in Baltimore. While in Cincinnati, he checked into rehab, but the stay was brief. He was drinking the night he nearly lost his life in an accident that left him with a bruised sternum, a broken back, and broken ribs. Paris would spend the 1987 season out of baseball, working in a dental lab making dentures for $4.25 an hour. Paris would later sign a contract with the Chicago White Sox, playing in the minors until he was called up in the summer of 1988. In one of his first games back in the big leagues, he hit a homer run to help the White Sox defeat the Angels 6–3. His stay in the big leagues would be brief. He'd play his last major league game on August 30 against the Detroit Tigers and the White Sox released him on November 8, 1988.
