= Jack Hardy (pitcher) =

American baseball player (born 1959)

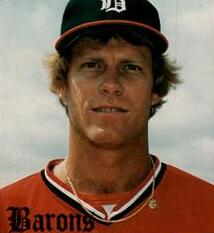
- Hardy with the Birmingham Barons c. 1987
- Pitcher
- Born: October 8, 1959 (age 66); St. Petersburg, Florida, U.S.
- Batted: Right Threw: Right

MLB debut
- May 23, 1989, for the Chicago White Sox

Last MLB appearance
- June 2, 1989, for the Chicago White Sox

MLB statistics
- Win–loss record: 0–0
- Earned run average: 6.57
- Strikeouts: 4
- Stats at Baseball Reference

Teams
- Chicago White Sox (1989)

John Graydon "Jack" Hardy (born October 8, 1959) is an American former professional baseball player. He was a right-handed pitcher for one season (1989) with the Chicago White Sox of the Major League Baseball (MLB). For his career, he recorded no decisions, with a 6.57 earned run average, and four strikeouts in 12⅓ innings pitched.
