= Sap Randall =

American baseball player (born 1960)

- First baseman
- Born: August 19, 1960 (age 65); Mobile, Alabama, U.S.
- Batted: Both Threw: Right

MLB debut
- August 2, 1988, for the Chicago White Sox

Last MLB appearance
- August 6, 1988, for the Chicago White Sox

MLB statistics
- Games played: 4
- At bats: 12
- Hits: 0
- Stats at Baseball Reference

Teams
- Chicago White Sox (1988)

James Odell "Sap" Randall (born August 19, 1960) is an American former first baseman who played for the Chicago White Sox of the Major League Baseball (MLB) in 1988.
