= Carlos Martínez (infielder) =

Venezuelan baseball player (1965–2006)

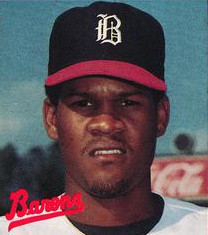
- First baseman / Third baseman
- Born: August 11, 1965; La Guaira, Vargas, Venezuela
- Died: January 24, 2006 (aged 40); La Guaira, Vargas, Venezuela
- Batted: Right Threw: Right

MLB debut
- September 2, 1988, for the Chicago White Sox

Last MLB appearance
- July 20, 1995, for the California Angels

MLB statistics
- Batting average: .258
- Home runs: 25
- Runs batted in: 161
- Stats at Baseball Reference

Teams
- Chicago White Sox (1988–1990); Cleveland Indians (1991–1993); California Angels (1995)

Carlos Alberto Martínez Escobar (August 11, 1965 – January 24, 2006) was a Venezuelan professional baseball player. He played in Major League Baseball (MLB) as a first baseman and third baseman from 1988 to 1995 for the Chicago White Sox, Cleveland Indians and California Angels. Listed at 6 ft 5 in (1.96 m), 175 pounds (79 kg), he batted and threw right handed.

== Career ==
Martínez was born in La Guaira, the capital city of Vargas state in Venezuela, and played his entire career in the Venezuelan Winter League for his home city team the Tiburones de La Guaira.

Martínez, affectionately nicknamed ″Café″, was signed by the New York Yankees as a free agent in 1983. During the 1986 season, he was sent to the White Sox in the same trade that brought Ron Kittle to the Yankees. Martínez made his major league debut at the age of 22 with the Chicago White Sox in 1988.

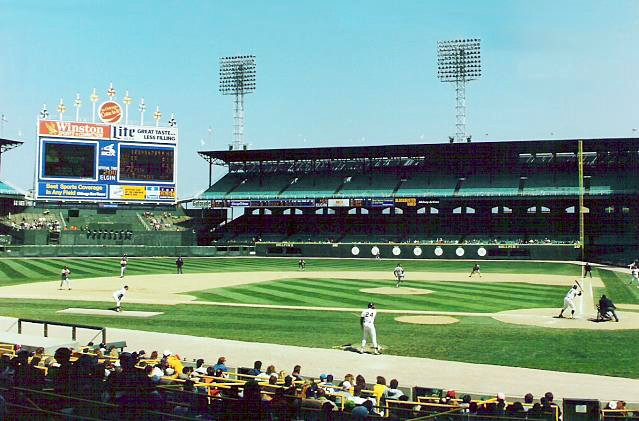
Martínez (24) is the on-deck hitter at Comiskey Park during a game in 1990

Despite his impressive frame, Martínez never was able to fulfill the potential that he showed in the minor leagues. His most productive season came in 1989 with the White Sox, when he posted career highs in batting average (.300), at-bats (350), hits (105), runs (44) and doubles (22), and also was named to the Topps All-Star Rookie Team.

Besides playing for the White Sox, Martínez also spent playing time as a utility player with the Indians and made his last major-league appearance with the Angels in 1995. He is perhaps best remembered as the batter who hit the long fly ball that bounced off José Canseco's head for a home run on May 26, 1993.

In a seven-season career in MLB, Martínez was a .258 hitter with 25 home runs and 161 RBI in 465 game appearances. His minor-league totals include a .276 batting average with 50 homers and 310 RBI in 595 games. He was a reinforcement player for the Águilas del Zulia club that won the 1989 Caribbean Series title.

== Personal life ==
His son, José Martínez, is an outfielder who has played minor league baseball for the White Sox, Atlanta Braves, Kansas City Royals and St. Louis Cardinals, and in the major leagues with the Cardinals in 2016–2019, Tampa Bay Rays and Chicago Cubs in 2020, and currently plays for the New York Mets. While playing for the Royals' Triple-A affiliate Omaha Storm Chasers in 2015, he broke the Pacific Coast League (PCL) record with a .384 average and led the league in on-base percentage (OBP, .461) and was an All-Star.

Martínez died on January 24, 2006, in Catia La Mar, Vargas, at age 40 after a long battle with stomach cancer, according to an article about his son in issue #2 of Cardinals Gameday Magazine.

== See also ==
- List of players from Venezuela in Major League Baseball
