= Daryl Boston =

American baseball player & coach (born 1963)

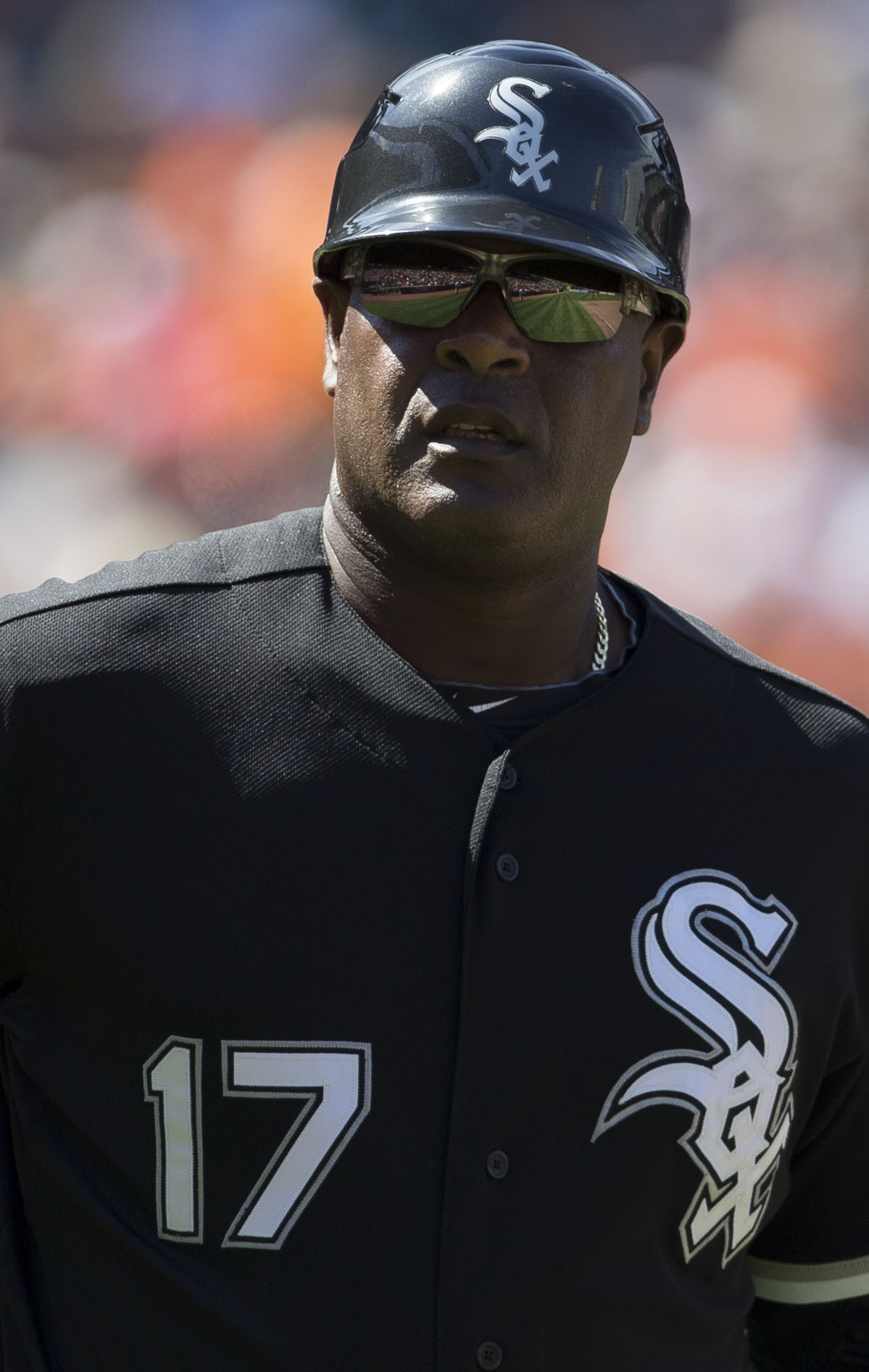
- Boston with the Chicago White Sox in 2013
- Outfielder / Coach
- Born: January 4, 1963 (age 63); Cincinnati, Ohio, U.S.
- Batted: Left Threw: Left

MLB debut
- May 13, 1984, for the Chicago White Sox

Last MLB appearance
- August 11, 1994, for the New York Yankees

MLB statistics
- Batting average: .249
- Home runs: 83
- Runs batted in: 278
- Stats at Baseball Reference

Teams
- As player: Chicago White Sox (1984–1990); New York Mets (1990–1992); Colorado Rockies (1993); New York Yankees (1994); As coach: Chicago White Sox (2013–2023)

Daryl Lamont Boston (born January 4, 1963) is an American former Major League Baseball outfielder, and the former first base coach for the Chicago White Sox.

== No. 7 overall pick ==
Boston was drafted by the Chicago White Sox in the first round (seventh overall) of the 1981 Major League Baseball draft. He batted .265 with 36 home runs and 164 runs batted in over three seasons in the White Sox farm system when he was called up to the majors in early 1984. Batting lead off, Boston went 3-for-5 with a triple, stolen base, two RBIs and two runs scored in his major league debut on May 13. He soon began to struggle, however, and was optioned back to the triple A Denver Zephyrs. He received a September call up, but had just eight hits in 58 at bats. Overall, he batted .169 with three RBIs and no home runs with the White Sox. In Denver, he batted .312 with fifteen home runs and 82 RBIs.

== Chicago White Sox ==
Boston was given the opportunity to win the White Sox starting centerfield job for the 1985 season, although he struggled batting only .215 with three home runs and eleven RBIs when he was sent back down to triple-A. He batted .274 with ten home runs and 36 RBIs in a 63 game stint with the Buffalo Bisons. Upon his return to the Chisox that September, he batted .261 with four RBIs.

During Spring training 1986, he was beaten out for the centerfield job by John Cangelosi. On July 23, the Sox traded left fielder Bobby Bonilla to the Pittsburgh Pirates for pitcher José DeLeón. Cangelosi was shifted to left, and Boston, who was batting .303 in 96 games in Buffalo, was called back up to Chicago to take over in center. He batted .266 with 22 RBIs and five home runs, one of which came on October 4 off Bert Blyleven. This was the 50th and last longball Blyleven allowed that year, which is a record for most homers allowed in one year.

He had his most productive season with the White Sox in 1987, when he batted .258 with ten home runs and 29 RBIs backing up Ken Williams and Gary Redus in center and left, respectively. He would spend the remainder of his White Sox career as the fourth outfielder. On April 30, 1990, the New York Mets selected Boston off waivers.

== New York Mets ==
The Mets were using Keith Miller, who is an infielder by trade, in centerfield prior to acquiring Boston. Boston immediately took over as the Mets' center fielder. He got off to a slow start (0-for his first-9), but soon began to hit. He went 3-for-4 with his first Mets home run on May 7 to lead the Mets to a 7-1 victory over the Houston Astros. Despite not debuting with the Mets until May 3, his first season with the team turned out to be the best season of his career, where with a high of 366 at bats, he had a career high 45 RBIs and eighteen stolen bases (19 on the season, including one with the White Sox) while batting .273. Most importantly, he solidified centerfield with a .985 fielding percentage.

During the off season, the Mets signed free agent Vince Coleman to play center with Boston taking on more of a fourth outfielder role. Injuries to Coleman caused him to miss more than half the season, however, and Boston logged 426 innings in center.

During Spring training 1992, an incident from the previous Spring plagued the Mets clubhouse. Boston, Coleman and Dwight Gooden were accused of rape by Cindy Powell, who was also a known associate of a fourth teammate, David Cone. Charges were dropped when Florida State Attorney Bruce Colton cited a lack of corroborating evidence and the nearly year long delay in Powell's complaint as reasons for the unlikelihood of conviction.

The bulk of Boston's playing time for the 1992 Mets involved subbing for injuries or suspensions of Coleman. Boston batted .249 with eleven home runs, which was third best on the team.

== Colorado Rockies ==
Boston signed a one-year deal with the expansion Colorado Rockies as a free agent for their inaugural season in 1993. He batted .261 with fourteen home runs and forty RBIs backing up all three outfield positions.

He signed with the New York Yankees for the 1994 season. He had a very limited role, batting just .182 in 52 of the 113 games the Yankees played in 1994. They were 6.5 games up in the American League East when the player strike ended the season, and ended Boston's chance of making the postseason for the first time in his career.

== Career statistics ==
Games	PA	AB	Runs	Hits	2B	3B	HR	RBI	SB	BB	SO	Avg.	OBP	Slg.	OPS	Fld%
1058	2901	2629	378	655	131	22	83	278	98	237	469	.249	.312	.410	.722	.977

Boston signed a minor league deal with the Florida Marlins for the 1995 season. In eighteen games with the Charlotte Knights, he batted .188 with one home run and two RBIs. He finished the season with the Independent Northern League Thunder Bay Whiskey Jacks, then spent the 1996 season as a player/manager with the Prairie League Regina Cyclones before retiring.

In 2001, Boston was named minor league roving outfield instructor for the White Sox. In 2013, then White Sox manager Robin Ventura named Boston the team's first base coach, a position he retained through the 2023 season.

== Baseball family ==
Boston's father, Henry, played Negro league baseball with the Cincinnati Tigers. His twin brother, David, was once an outfielder in the Cincinnati Reds organization. His younger brother, D.J., played minor league and Independent League baseball for sixteen years, and now serves as the hitting coach of the Milwaukee Milkmen.
