= José Segura (baseball) =

Dominican baseball player (born 1963)

Jose Segura
- Pitcher
- Born: January 26, 1963 (age 63); Fundación, Dominican Republic
- Batted: Right Threw: Right

MLB debut
- April 10, 1988, for the Chicago White Sox

Last MLB appearance
- July 4, 1991, for the San Francisco Giants

MLB statistics
- Win–loss record: 0–2
- Earned run average: 9.00
- Strikeouts: 16
- Stats at Baseball Reference

Teams
- Chicago White Sox (1988–1989); San Francisco Giants (1991)

Jose Altagracia Segura Mota (born January 26, 1963) is a Dominican former Major League Baseball pitcher. He played during three seasons at the major league level for the Chicago White Sox and San Francisco Giants. He was signed by the Philadelphia Phillies as an amateur free agent in 1981. Segura played his first professional season (in American baseball) with their Rookie league Helena Phillies in 1981, and his last with the New York Yankees' Triple-A Columbus Clippers in 1995. Segura played for the Wei Chuan Dragons from 1995 to 1997 in the Chinese Professional Baseball League.
