= Jeff Schaefer =

American baseball player (born 1960)

- Infielder
- Born: May 31, 1960 (age 66); Patchogue, New York, U.S.
- Batted: Right Threw: Right

MLB debut
- April 7, 1989, for the Chicago White Sox

Last MLB appearance
- June 15, 1994, for the Oakland Athletics

MLB statistics
- Batting average: .203
- Home runs: 2
- Runs batted in: 20
- Stats at Baseball Reference

Teams
- Chicago White Sox (1989); Seattle Mariners (1990–1992); Oakland Athletics (1994)

Jeffrey Scott Schaefer (born May 31, 1960) is an American former professional baseball utility infielder. He played all or parts of five seasons in the majors between 1989 and 1994. Of the 225 games Schaefer played in the majors, about half (110) were at shortstop, with most of the rest at third base (81) or second base (25).

Schaefer played college baseball for the University of Maryland Terrapins. He was named to the All-Atlantic Coast Conference team in 1981. The Baltimore Orioles drafted him in the 12th round of the 1981 MLB draft. He played in the minors for the Orioles, California Angels, and Los Angeles Dodgers before signing with the Chicago White Sox in November 1987.

Schaefer made his MLB debut with the White Sox in April 1989, earning a spot on the team's Opening Day roster. He batted .100 in 15 games, returning to the minors in mid-May. He signed with the Seattle Mariners after the season. He was one of eight players ejected following a benches-clearing brawl with the Milwaukee Brewers on June 30, 1990. He went 0-for-18 following that ejection. He hit .206 in his first year with the Mariners. Schaefer had his best offensive season in 1991, setting career highs with a .250 batting average, one home run, 11 RBI, and 84 games played. He hit his second and final MLB home run on April 15, 1992 against the White Sox. He became a free agent after that season.

After spending the 1993 season in Triple-A, Schaefer signed with Baltimore before the 1994 season. He was released in May and signed with the Oakland Athletics. He played in 6 more MLB games before he requested being sent back to the minors before the start of the players' strike. He retired after that season.

== Post-playing career ==
Schaefer was inducted into the Suffolk Sports Hall of Fame on Long Island, New York in 2010.

Schaefer co-founded Advocacy Baseball Consultants, which helps high school baseball players get recruited by colleges.
