= Ken Patterson =

American baseball player (born 1964)

- Relief pitcher
- Born: July 8, 1964 (age 60); Costa Mesa, California, U.S.
- Batted: Left Threw: Left

MLB debut
- July 8, 1988, for the Chicago White Sox

Last MLB appearance
- April 24, 1994, for the California Angels

MLB statistics
- Win–loss record: 14–8
- Earned run average: 3.88
- Strikeouts: 183

Teams
- Chicago White Sox (1988–1991); Chicago Cubs (1992); California Angels (1993–1994)

Kenneth Brian Patterson (born July 8, 1964), is an American former professional baseball player who pitched in Major League Baseball from 1988–1994. He taught private lessons in the Central Texas area from 1998–2004 before beginning his coaching career as a rookie league pitching coach for the Batavia Muckdogs of the Philadelphia Phillies organization in 2005. Patterson then coached the Arkansas Travelers, a Los Angeles of Anaheim affiliate, from 2006 to 2010. He won the Texas League Mike Coolbaugh Coach of the Year Award in 2009. Ken Patterson currently serves as a pitching coach for the McLennan Community College Highlanders in Waco, Texas, where he was a member of the 1983 NJCAA National Championship team.

== See also ==
- Chicago White Sox all-time roster
