= Tom McCarthy (1980s pitcher) =

American baseball player (born 1961)

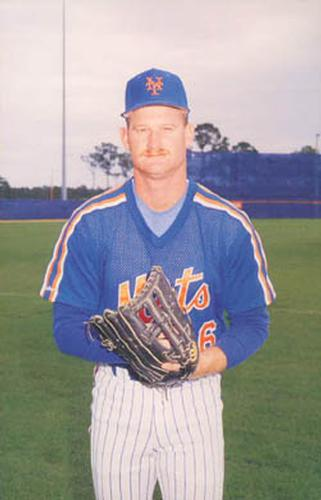
- Pitcher
- Born: June 18, 1961 (age 64); Landstuhl, West Germany
- Batted: Right Threw: Right

MLB debut
- July 5, 1985, for the Boston Red Sox

Last MLB appearance
- September 22, 1989, for the Chicago White Sox

MLB statistics
- Win–loss record: 3–2
- Earned run average: 3.61
- Strikeouts: 34
- Stats at Baseball Reference

Teams
- Boston Red Sox (1985); Chicago White Sox (1988–1989)

Thomas Michael McCarthy (born June 18, 1961) is an American former professional baseball middle relief pitcher. He played in Major League Baseball (MLB) from 1985 through 1989 for the Boston Red Sox (1985) and Chicago White Sox (1988–89). Listed at 6' 0", 180 lb., McCarthy batted and threw right-handed.

== Career ==
In a three-season career, McCarthy posted a 3–2 record with a 3.61 ERA and one save in 40 appearances, including 20 games finished, 34 strikeouts, 26 walks, 88 hits allowed, and 84 2/3 innings of work.

Following his majors career, McCarthy pitched for Triple-A Richmond Braves (1992), Charlotte Knights (1993) and Albuquerque Dukes. In 106 appearances, he went 13–14 with a 4.13 ERA and six saves.

== See also ==
- Boston Red Sox all-time roster
- Chicago White Sox all-time roster
