= Jeff Bittiger =

American baseball player (1962–2025)

- Baseball trading card of Bittiger from 1989
- Relief pitcher
- Born: April 13, 1962; Jersey City, New Jersey, U.S.
- Died: July 19, 2025 (aged 63); Saylorsburg, Pennsylvania, U.S.
- Batted: Right Threw: Right

MLB debut
- September 2, 1986, for the Philadelphia Phillies

Last MLB appearance
- May 30, 1989, for the Chicago White Sox

MLB statistics
- Win–loss record: 4–6
- Earned run average: 4.77
- Strikeouts: 53
- Stats at Baseball Reference

Teams
- Philadelphia Phillies (1986); Minnesota Twins (1987); Chicago White Sox (1988–1989)

Jeffrey Scott Bittiger (April 13, 1962 – July 19, 2025) was an American professional baseball player who was a relief pitcher for the Philadelphia Phillies, Minnesota Twins, and Chicago White Sox of Major League Baseball (MLB). He pitched four seasons in the major leagues, from 1986 until 1989. He was the player-personnel consultant for the independent league Fargo-Moorhead RedHawks, as of 2016. He also was listed as a professional scout for the Oakland Athletics, based in Pennsylvania.

== Amateur career ==
Raised in Secaucus, New Jersey, Bittiger played prep baseball at Secaucus High School.

Bittiger attended college at Jersey City State University and Seton Hall University in the off seasons, and was drafted by the New York Mets out of high school in the 7th round of the 1980 draft on June 3.

== Professional career ==
=== New York Mets system ===
Bittiger briefly played third base in the minor leagues before being converted into a full-time pitcher in 1981. Thereafter, he helped lead the Tides to win the AAA World Series in 1983. He remained in the minor leagues until January 16, 1986, when the Mets traded him to the Philadelphia Phillies.

=== Phillies ===
Bittiger broke into Major League Baseball as a starter for the Philadelphia Phillies in 1986. He hit a home run off Bob Kipper of the Pittsburgh Pirates on September 22, 1986, in his second at bat as a player for the Phillies, earning his first career win and getting credit for the game-winning RBI. He started only three games for the Phillies, and had a 5.70 ERA in 14 2/3 IP. He played for the Phillies until December 8, 1986, when he was released. He was signed by the Atlanta Braves just 12 days later on December 20, 1986, but was released by that organization April 4, 1987. On April 15, he signed with the Minnesota Twins.

=== Twins ===
In 1987, Bittiger pitched infrequently for the Minnesota Twins, first as a starter, then as a middle man. He pitched one inning in the Twins loss to the Kansas City Royals, giving up two hits and one earned run. The Twins went on to beat the Royals and eventually win the World Series in October 1987. The Twins released him after the season on November 12, 1987, and on January 22, 1988, he was signed by the Chicago White Sox.

=== White Sox ===
The next year, 1988, Bittiger played for the Chicago White Sox, pitching in a career high 25 games, starting seven of them. In his seven starts, Bittiger went 2–4, and had a no decision in the other game. His ERA for 1988 was 4.26 in 61 2/3 IP. The next year Bittiger pitched in only two major league games, starting one, which he lost. His ERA for the year was 6.85 in 9 2/3 IP. After the season, Bittiger was traded to the Los Angeles Dodgers for Tracy Woodson, but he never pitched in the majors again. He continued to pitch in the minor leagues until 2002.

== Death ==
On July 19, 2025, Bittiger died from cancer at his home in Saylorsburg, Pennsylvania. He was 63.
