= Fred Manrique =

Venezuelan baseball player (born 1961)

- Second baseman
- Born: November 5, 1961 (age 64); Ciudad Bolivar, Venezuela
- Batted: Right Threw: Right

MLB debut
- August 23, 1981, for the Toronto Blue Jays

Last MLB appearance
- May 11, 1991, for the Oakland Athletics

MLB statistics
- Batting average: .254
- Home runs: 20
- Runs batted in: 151
- Stats at Baseball Reference

Teams
- Toronto Blue Jays (1981, 1984); Montreal Expos (1985); St. Louis Cardinals (1986); Chicago White Sox (1987–1989); Texas Rangers (1989); Minnesota Twins (1990); Oakland Athletics (1991)

Fred Eloy Manrique Reyes [man-RE-keh] (born November 5, 1961) is a Venezuelan former Major League Baseball second baseman who played for the Toronto Blue Jays (1981, 1984), Montreal Expos (1985), St. Louis Cardinals (1986), Chicago White Sox (1987–89), Texas Rangers (1989), Minnesota Twins (1990) and Oakland Athletics (1991). He batted and threw right-handed.

== Career ==
A native of Bolívar State, Venezuela, and the youngest of 10 children, the well-traveled Manrique was a solid second baseman with a good range and a strong throwing arm that allowed him to play deep and steal hits. He also was an above-average shortstop. When he debuted in the Major Leagues in 1981 as a 19-year-old, he was the youngest player in the Major Leagues.

In a nine-year career, Manrique was a .254 hitter with 20 home runs and 151 RBI in 498 games.

== See also ==
- List of Major League Baseball players from Venezuela
