= Ron Karkovice =

American baseball player (born 1963)

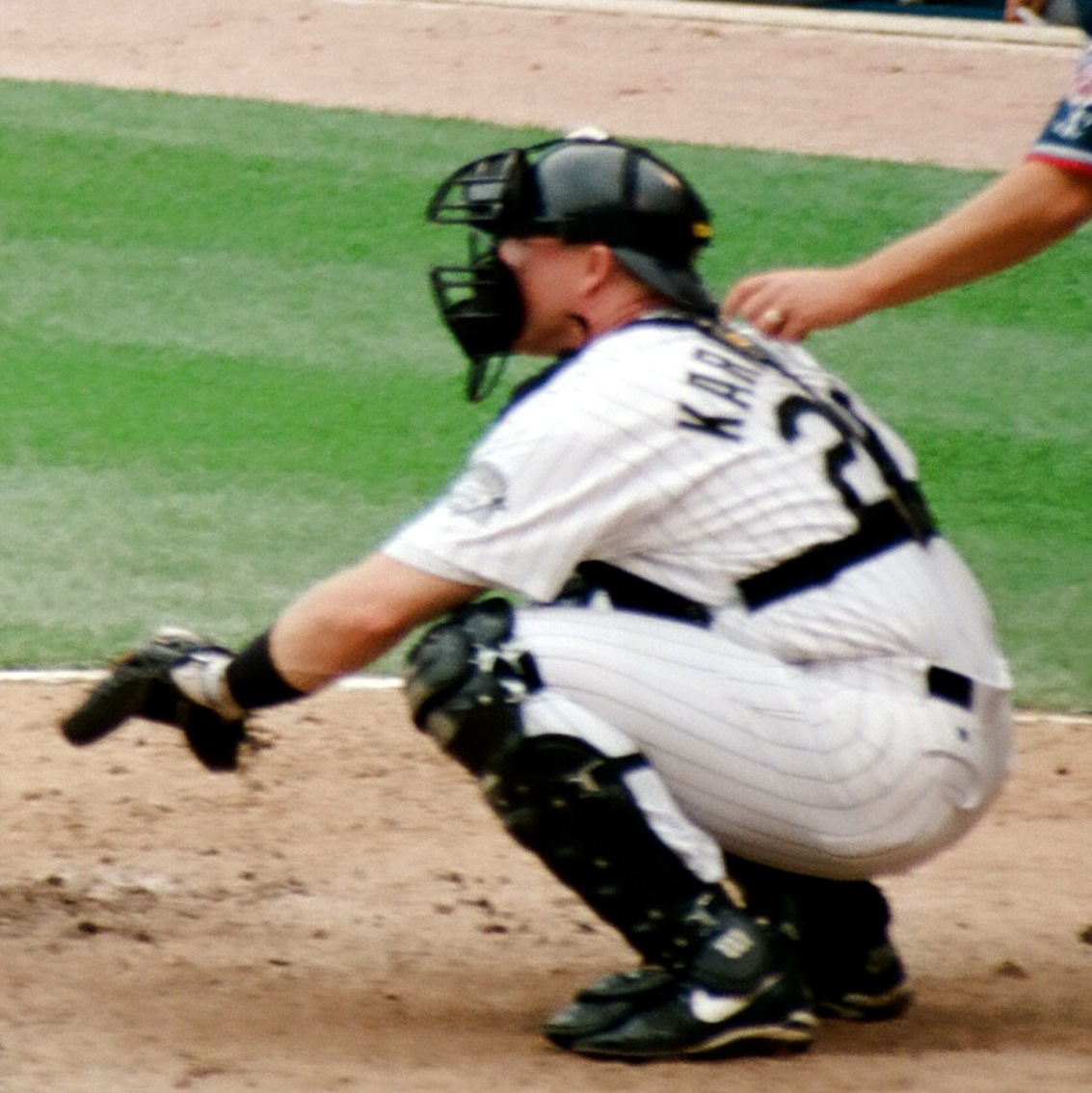
- Karkovice at New Comiskey Park in 1997
- Catcher
- Born: August 8, 1963 (age 63); Union Township, New Jersey, U.S.
- Batted: Right Threw: Right

MLB debut
- August 17, 1986, for the Chicago White Sox

Last MLB appearance
- September 26, 1997, for the Chicago White Sox

MLB statistics
- Batting average: .221
- Home runs: 96
- Runs batted in: 335
- Stats at Baseball Reference

Teams
- Chicago White Sox (1986–1997)

Ronald Joseph Karkovice (/ˈkɑːrkoʊvaɪs/ KAR-koh-vyse; born August 8, 1963) is an American former professional baseball catcher.

Drafted by the Chicago White Sox in the 1st round of the 1982 MLB amateur draft, Karkovice would make his Major League Baseball debut with the Chicago White Sox on August 17, 1986, and appeared in his final game on September 26, 1997. Based on Karkovice's great defensive prowess in throwing out baserunners attempting to steal bases, White Sox broadcaster Ken "Hawk" Harrelson nicknamed him "Officer Karkovice," jokingly warning opponents that the catcher would catch them stealing.

== Early life ==
When Karkovice was seven years old, his family moved to Florida after his father, who worked for United Airlines, was transferred. He began playing baseball in Little League at age eight. Karkovice later attended Boone High School in Orlando, where he first started catching at 14, and was teammates with Joe Oliver. He was named to the 1982 ABCA/Rawlings High School All-America First Team. Karkovice was inducted into Boone's Hall of Fame in 2004.

== Playing career ==
Karkovice was one of the best fielding catchers in the Major Leagues during his time with the White Sox. For his career, he threw out 41% of base stealers. In 1993, he threw out 54% of them.

On August 30, 1990, Karkovice hit an inside-the-park grand slam off of Minnesota Twins pitcher David West at the Hubert H. Humphrey Metrodome.

== Coaching career ==
In 2001 Karkovice managed the Gulf Coast League Royals. He then coached the First Academy baseball team in Orlando in an assistant capacity, before moving on as head coach for Pine Castle Christian Academy. From 2009 to 2011, Karkovice served as hitting coach for the Newark Bears of the Atlantic League of Professional Baseball. In 2012, Karkovice was named bench coach for the Camden Riversharks, another Atlantic League team. He was promoted to manager of the club the next year.

== Personal life ==
In the 1990s, Karkovice was an early investor in Stix Baseball, a baseball bat manufacturer that was eventually bought by Easton.

Karkovice opened Ronnie's Big League Deli in Orlando in November 2003.

Professional baseball pitcher Jake Brigham is Karkovice's nephew.

== See also ==
- List of Major League Baseball players who spent their entire career with one franchise
