= Russ Morman =

American baseball player (born 1962)

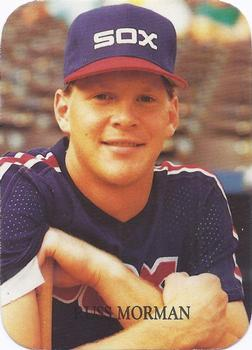
- First baseman
- Born: April 28, 1962 (age 63); Independence, Missouri, U.S.
- Batted: Right Threw: Right

MLB debut
- August 3, 1986, for the Chicago White Sox

Last MLB appearance
- September 27, 1997, for the Florida Marlins

MLB statistics
- Batting average: .249
- Home runs: 10
- Runs batted in: 43
- Stats at Baseball Reference

Teams
- Chicago White Sox (1986, 1988–1989); Kansas City Royals (1990–1991); Florida Marlins (1994–1997)

Russell Lee Morman (born April 28, 1962) is an American professional baseball coach, manager, and former Major League Baseball (MLB) first baseman/outfielder who played for the Chicago White Sox, Kansas City Royals, and Florida Marlins between 1986 and 1997.

== Playing career ==
A native of Independence, Missouri, Morman played college baseball at Iowa Western Community College and Wichita State University. In 1982, he played collegiate summer baseball with the Orleans Cardinals of the Cape Cod Baseball League. He was selected by the White Sox in the first round of the 1983 MLB draft.

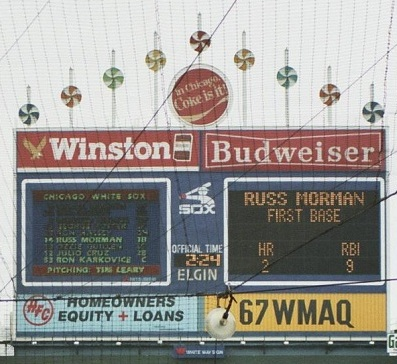
Morman's name on the Comiskey Park scoreboard

== Coaching career ==
After his playing career ended, Morman managed in the Marlin and Boston Red Sox farm systems and served as a hitting coach for the Portland Sea Dogs and Pawtucket Red Sox through the 2009 season.

He was the hitting coach of the Richmond Flying Squirrels of the Eastern League and Double-A affiliate of the San Francisco Giants, in 2010. In 2011, he became the hitting coach for the Fresno Grizzlies of the Pacific Coast League, then the Giants' Triple-A affiliate.

In 2014 the Giants announced that Morman would return to managing and Richmond as the skipper of the Flying Squirrels and they assigned him to the Class A San Jose Giants of the California League for 2015.

His career minor-league managerial record is 290–265 (.523) over four seasons.

== Personal life ==
In 2005, Morman was inducted into the Kansas City Sports Commission Hall of Fame.

Preceded by Dave Machemer	Richmond Flying Squirrels manager 2014	Succeeded by Jose Alguacil
