= Iván Calderón (baseball) =

Puerto Rican baseball player (1962–2003)

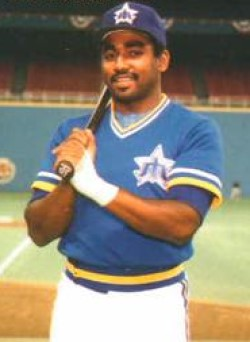
- Outfielder
- Born: March 19, 1962; Fajardo, Puerto Rico
- Died: December 27, 2003 (aged 41); Loiza, Puerto Rico
- Batted: Right Threw: Right

MLB debut
- August 10, 1984, for the Seattle Mariners

Last MLB appearance
- October 3, 1993, for the Chicago White Sox

MLB statistics
- Batting average: .272
- Home runs: 104
- Runs batted in: 444
- Stats at Baseball Reference

Teams
- Seattle Mariners (1984–1986); Chicago White Sox (1986–1990); Montreal Expos (1991–1992); Boston Red Sox (1993); Chicago White Sox (1993)

Career highlights and awards
- All-Star (1991)

Iván Calderón Pérez (March 19, 1962 – December 27, 2003) was a Puerto Rican professional baseball outfielder. He played in Major League Baseball (MLB) for four teams from 1984 to 1993, and was named an All-Star in 1991. Listed at 6 feet 1 inch (1.85 m) and 220 pounds (100 kg), he batted and threw right-handed. Nicknamed "Ivan the Terrible", Calderón was killed in a shooting in Puerto Rico in December 2003.

== Professional career ==
Calderón was signed by the Seattle Mariners as an undrafted free agent on July 30, 1979. He began his minor league career in 1980 with the Bellingham Mariners, a farm team of the Mariners. Calderón reached Triple-A in 1984.

=== Seattle Mariners ===
Calderón made his major league debut on August 10, 1984. In 11 games with the Mariners that season, he batted .208 with one home run and one run batted in (RBI). Calderón played in 67 games with Seattle in 1985 and 37 games in 1986. In parts of three seasons with the Mariners, he batted .263 with 11 home runs and 42 RBIs in 115 games.

=== Chicago White Sox ===
On July 1, 1986, Calderón was sent to the Chicago White Sox as the player to be named later in trade five days earlier that sent catcher Scott Bradley to the Mariners. Calderón was a regular starter for Chicago in three seasons (1987, 1989, and 1990) with at least 144 appearances in each of those seasons. He hit a career-high 28 home runs in 1987 and a career-high 87 RBIs in 1989.

=== Montreal Expos ===
After the 1990 season, Calderón was acquired by the Montreal Expos, in a multi-player deal that sent Tim Raines to the White Sox. The Expos raised Calderón's salary to over $2 million a season, and he earned a spot on the National League's roster for the 1991 MLB All-Star Game. He batted 1-for-2 in the All-Star Game with a stolen base. Calderón batted a career-high .300 in 1991. Injuries during limited him to 48 games in 1992. Overall in two seasons with the Expos, Calderón batted .291 with 22 home runs and 99 RBIs in 182 games.

=== Boston Red Sox ===
After the 1992 season, Calderón was traded to the Boston Red Sox for pitchers Mike Gardiner and Terry Powers. In 73 games with the 1993 Red Sox, Calderón batted .221 with one home run and 19 RBIs. Boston released Calderón on August 17, 1993.

=== Chicago White Sox (second stint) ===
Calderón returned to the White Sox, signing with the team on August 31, 1993. In nine games late in the 1993 season, his final professional appearances, he batted .115 (3-for-26) with three RBIs. During parts of six seasons with the White Sox (1986–1990 and 1993), Calderón batted .273 with 70 home runs and 284 RBIs in 554 games.

=== Career statistics ===
Calderón was a career .272 hitter with 104 home runs and 444 RBIs in 924 major-league games. Defensively, he was primarily an outfielder (755 games), split nearly evenly between right field (382 games) and left field (377 games), with 11 appearances as a center fielder. He also made 32 appearances as a first baseman and was the designated hitter in 105 games. As an outfielder, he had a .976 fielding percentage.

== Death ==
On December 27, 2003, Calderón was shot multiple times in the head and back, at point-blank range, with a .45 calibre weapon while at a bar in Loíza, Puerto Rico. His murder remained unsolved, as of 2026. Calderón and his wife had two children; he also had five other children from other relationships. He was buried at Cementerio Municipal del Pueblo de Loíza in Loíza, Puerto Rico.

== See also ==
- List of Major League Baseball players from Puerto Rico
- List of unsolved murders (2000–present)
