= Bobby Thigpen =

American baseball player (born 1963)

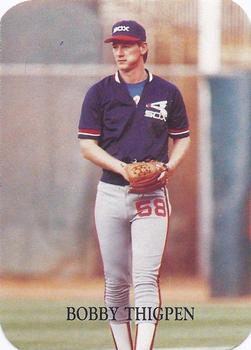
- Pitcher
- Born: July 17, 1963 (age 63); Tallahassee, Florida, U.S.
- Batted: Right Threw: Right

Professional debut
- MLB: August 6, 1986, for the Chicago White Sox
- NPB: June 11, 1994, for the Fukuoka Daiei Hawks

Last appearance
- MLB: April 27, 1994, for the Seattle Mariners
- NPB: June 17, 1995, for the Fukuoka Daiei Hawks

MLB statistics
- Win–loss record: 31–36
- Earned run average: 3.43
- Strikeouts: 376
- Saves: 201

NPB statistics
- Win–loss record: 3–3
- Earned run average: 1.94
- Strikeouts: 31
- Saves: 20
- Stats at Baseball Reference

Teams
- Chicago White Sox (1986–1993); Philadelphia Phillies (1993); Seattle Mariners (1994); Fukuoka Daiei Hawks (1994–1995)

Career highlights and awards
- All-Star (1990); AL Rolaids Relief Man Award (1990); AL saves leader (1990)

Robert Thomas Thigpen (born July 17, 1963) is an American former relief pitcher in Major League Baseball. He is noted for setting the major league record of 57 saves during the 1990 season, which has since been broken by former Los Angeles Angels of Anaheim pitcher Francisco Rodríguez. He is the former pitching coach of the Winston-Salem Dash. He is also the former bullpen coach for the Chicago White Sox.

== Baseball career ==
Thigpen was a three sport star at Aucilla Christian Academy near Monticello, Florida. As a member of the baseball team he played for longtime Aucilla coach, Ray Hughes. A pitcher and shortstop in high school, he led the Warriors to the 1981 Class A state championship game.

He played two years at Seminole Community College, after which he moved on to pitch and play the outfield for Mississippi State University and coach Ron Polk. Among his teammates were future major-leaguers Will Clark, Rafael Palmeiro and Jeff Brantley. Thigpen was part of MSU's 1985 College World Series team, recording a .305 batting average and saving seven games during the season.

Thigpen was selected by the Chicago White Sox in the fourth round of the 1985 amateur draft. He made the major leagues the next August and moved into the White Sox's closer role. After two straight 30-save seasons, Thigpen had the best season of his career in 1990, setting the then-major league record of 57 saves (his record was eclipsed by Francisco Rodríguez when he made 62 saves in 2008). He also maintained a 1.83 ERA and was named to the AL All-Star team. He also blew eight saves that season, including two three-run leads.

He later battled injuries, starting with a back problem developed after the 1990 season, when some players went on an exhibition tour of Japan. Thigpen's effectiveness waned and he was supplanted in the closer role by Roberto Hernández.

During the 1993 season, Thigpen was traded to the Philadelphia Phillies for José DeLeón, and pitched in the NLCS and World Series for Philadelphia. The following season, he signed with the Seattle Mariners in a minor league contract, who released him on April 29. He joined the Fukuoka Daiei Hawks and attempted to return to the majors in 1996, only to be derailed by back problems, which ended his career.

Thigpen's 201 career saves rank him 55th on the all-time saves list.

== Post-baseball injury ==
In 2003, Thigpen was leaving a Stanley Cup playoff game at the St. Pete Times Forum when he tripped and fell on the stairs, triggering massive internal bleeding. "He had about a gallon of blood in his abdomen", said Dr. Kevin Hirsch, a trauma surgeon at Bayfront Medical Center who operated on Thigpen. "He had significant bleeding in and around his pancreas and kidney that we had to go in and stop." Thigpen spent a week in the hospital and recovered.

== See also ==
- List of Major League Baseball annual saves leaders

Preceded by Juan Nieves	Chicago White Sox bullpen coach 2013–2016	Succeeded by Curt Hasler
