= Joel Davis =

American baseball player (born 1965)

- Pitcher
- Born: January 30, 1965 (age 60); Jacksonville, Florida, U.S.
- Batted: Left Threw: Right

MLB debut
- August 11, 1985, for the Chicago White Sox

Last MLB appearance
- July 5, 1988, for the Chicago White Sox

MLB statistics
- Win–loss record: 8–14
- Earned run average: 4.91
- Strikeouts: 126
- Stats at Baseball Reference

Teams
- Chicago White Sox (1985–1988)

Joel Clark Davis (born January 30, 1965) is an American former Major League Baseball pitcher. He played professionally for the Chicago White Sox from 1985 to 1988.

== Career ==
Davis was born in Jacksonville, Florida, and graduated from Sandalwood High School in Jacksonville. He played minor league baseball with Sarasota of the Florida State League.

Davis was drafted by the Chicago White Sox in the first round (13th pick) of the 1983 Major League Baseball draft. He played his first Major League Baseball game on August 11, 1985. He is a left-handed batter and a right-handed thrower. Following major surgery on his right shoulder, Davis retired from playing. He played his last professional game on July 5, 1988.

He entered college and started teaching and coaching in 1996, coaching at Episcopal School of Jacksonville for five seasons. Davis joined the faculty of Stanton College Preparatory School in Jacksonville, Florida as a HOPE teacher in 2002 teaching health and life management. He also coaches the baseball team at Stanton. Davis was the baseball coach at Atlantic Coast High School in Jacksonville.

On February 8, 2020, Davis was arrested and charged with resisting arrest and violating an order of protection. Those charges were later dropped.

On May 13, 2020, Davis was arrested after violating a protective order by following his ex-wife to work, yelling at her, threatening her and grabbing her by the wrist and hair. He later pleaded guilty to misdemeanor charges of battery to cause bodily harm and violation of an injunction for protection and was sentenced to ten months of probation and fifty hours of community service and required to undergo a mental health evaluation.
