= Dave Gallagher =

American baseball player (born 1960)

- Outfielder
- Born: September 20, 1960 (age 65); Trenton, New Jersey, U.S.
- Batted: Right Threw: Right

MLB debut
- April 12, 1987, for the Cleveland Indians

Last MLB appearance
- October 2, 1995, for the California Angels

MLB statistics
- Batting average: .271
- Home runs: 17
- Runs batted in: 190
- Stats at Baseball Reference

Teams
- Cleveland Indians (1987); Chicago White Sox (1988–1990); Baltimore Orioles (1990); California Angels (1991, 1995); New York Mets (1992–1993); Atlanta Braves (1994); Philadelphia Phillies (1995)

David Thomas Gallagher (born September 20, 1960) is an American former professional baseball outfielder. He played in Major League Baseball (MLB) for seven teams from 1987–1995.

== Early life ==
Gallagher was born in Trenton, New Jersey, and grew up in the suburban Hamilton Square section of Hamilton Township, Mercer County, New Jersey. He played in the Nottingham Little League and — as a centerfielder —led Steinert High School to the Central Jersey title in its group and then to the state title for that group.

== Early years ==
Gallagher played college baseball at Mercer County Community College.

Gallagher was originally drafted third overall by the Oakland Athletics in the January 1980 amateur draft, but did not sign. Five months later, the Cleveland Indians selected him eighth overall in the June secondary draft, and he signed.

He spent seven seasons in the minors, batting .271 with 39 home runs and 316 runs batted in, when he attended spring training with the Indians in 1987. He was cut just at the end of Spring, but was immediately re-added to the major league roster when center fielder Brett Butler fractured his left middle finger in the home opener. In fourteen games in center field, Gallagher batted .111 with one double, one triple and one RBI. Upon Butler's return, he was optioned back to the triple A Buffalo Bisons. Shortly afterwards, he was traded to the Seattle Mariners for relief pitcher Mark Huismann. Despite batting .306 with 46 RBIs for the triple A Calgary Cannons, Gallagher did not fit into the Mariners' future plans, and asked for his release.

== Chicago White Sox ==
Gallagher joined the Chicago White Sox as a non-roster Spring training invitee in 1988, but again failed to make the major league roster, and was reassigned to triple A. He batted .336 with four home runs in 34 games with the Vancouver Canadians to earn a call up to the majors on May 13. In his first game for the Chisox, Gallagher went two for three with a triple, a walk two RBIs and two runs scored to lead his team to a 7–5 victory over the Toronto Blue Jays. The following day, he hit a home run off Mark Eichhorn in the thirteenth inning for the walk off victory over Toronto.

Gallagher continued his hot hitting, and became the White Sox starting center fielder for the remainder of the season. He batted .303 with five home runs and 31 RBIs as a rookie to be named the Topps Rookie All-Star center fielder in 1988 and finish fifth in American League Rookie of the Year balloting. He also developed into one of the top fielding outfielders in the American League. He led AL center fielders with a .994 fielding percentage and started four double plays in 1989.

An injury early in the 1990 season sidelined Gallagher. When he came back, he found that he had lost his starting job in center field to speedster Lance Johnson. He remained a fourth outfielder for the Sox until the Baltimore Orioles acquired him in a waiver deal on August 2.

== California Angels ==
At the 1990 Winter meetings, he was dealt to the California Angels for two minor leaguers. Platooning with Junior Felix in center, Gallagher batted .293 with one home run and thirty RBIs. On May 19, 1991, Gallagher recorded his first and only 5 hit game going 5-5, clubbing five singles, versus his former team the Baltimore Orioles. On December 10, 1991, he joined his fourth team in a little over a year when he was dealt to the New York Mets for Hubie Brooks.

== New York Mets ==
Gallagher was used primarily as a pinch hitter and late inning defensive replacement during his two-season stay in New York City. On July 18, 1993, Gallagher hit his only career grand slam against the San Francisco Giants' Michael Jackson. For the season, he hit a career high six home runs despite logging just 201 at-bats. On November 24, 1993, he was traded to the Atlanta Braves for pitcher Pete Smith.

== Final years ==
After just one season in Atlanta, Gallagher signed as a free agent with the Philadelphia Phillies. After batting just .190 as a pinch hitter with the Braves, Gallagher went six for ten with four doubles pinch hitting for the Phillies. He was traded back to the first place California Angels shortly after the non-waiver trade deadline for minor leaguer Kevin Flora and a player to be named later.

Though the Angels were interested in bringing Gallagher back for the 1996 season, the two sides were unable to reach an agreement. He ended up signing a minor league deal with the Cleveland Indians with an invitation to Spring training. He was cut on March 22, and retired.

== Teaching the game ==
Gallagher served as hitting instructor for the Eastern League's Trenton Thunder in 1997 and 1998. He was a baseball coach at Notre Dame High School in Mercer County, New Jersey, in 1999, and Mercer County Community College in 2000.

While in the minors, Gallagher invented the "Stride tutor" to help batters regulate their strides. In 2003, Gallagher opened the Dave Gallagher Baseball Academy. He and Mark Gola wrote an instructional book titled The Little League Hitter's Journal (Little League Baseball Guide), released in 2005.

In 2001, Gallagher opened a baseball camp near his home in Millstone Township, New Jersey.
