= José DeLeón =

Dominican baseball player (1960–2024)

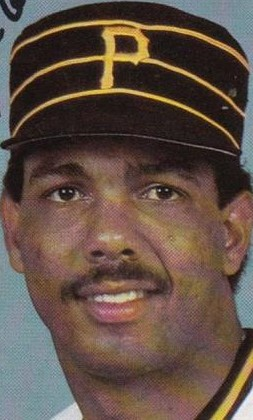
- Pitcher
- Born: December 20, 1960; La Vega, Dominican Republic
- Died: February 25, 2024 (aged 63)
- Batted: Right Threw: Right

MLB debut
- July 23, 1983, for the Pittsburgh Pirates

Last MLB appearance
- September 18, 1995, for the Montreal Expos

MLB statistics
- Win–loss record: 86–119
- Earned run average: 3.76
- Strikeouts: 1,594
- Stats at Baseball Reference

Teams
- Pittsburgh Pirates (1983–1986); Chicago White Sox (1986–1987); St. Louis Cardinals (1988–1992); Philadelphia Phillies (1992–1993); Chicago White Sox (1993–1995); Montreal Expos (1995)

Career highlights and awards
- NL strikeout leader (1989)

José DeLeón Chestaro (December 20, 1960 – February 25, 2024) was a Dominican professional baseball right-handed pitcher who played in Major League Baseball (MLB) with the Pittsburgh Pirates, Chicago White Sox, St. Louis Cardinals, Philadelphia Phillies, and Montreal Expos, over all or parts of 13 seasons from 1983 through 1995. DeLeón was the National League (NL) strikeout leader in 1989, while with the Cardinals.

== Career ==
DeLeón was selected by the Pittsburgh Pirates in the third round of the 1979 amateur draft. He made his MLB debut in 1983 with the Pirates. In July 1986, the Pirates traded him to the Chicago White Sox for Bobby Bonilla. Though DeLeón only won five games in 1986, two of those victories came in one week against 1986 Cy Young Award winner and AL MVP Roger Clemens, who went 24–4 in 1986. February 1988, the White Sox traded him to the St. Louis Cardinals for Ricky Horton and Lance Johnson. In 1989, DeLeón led the National League in strikeouts with 201.

After his release from the Cardinals in August 1992, DeLeón signed with the Philadelphia Phillies the next month. In August 1993, he was traded from the Phillies to the Chicago White Sox for Bobby Thigpen. In August 1995 the White Sox traded him to the Montreal Expos for Jeff Shaw.

DeLeón twice led the NL in losses, posting a record of 2–19 in 1985, for the Pirates, and 7–19 in 1990 with the Cardinals. For his career, he compiled a win–loss record of 86–119, in 415 appearances, with a 3.76 earned run average (ERA), and 1,594 strikeouts in 1,897.1 innings pitched.

== Death ==
DeLeón died on February 25, 2024, after a battle with cancer. He was 63.

== Personal life ==
DeLeón's daughter Alexa is married to NASCAR driver Tyler Reddick.

== See also ==
- List of Major League Baseball annual strikeout leaders
- List of St. Louis Cardinals team records

Preceded by Sid Fernandez	NL hits per nine innings 1989	Succeeded by Sid Fernandez
