= Kenny Williams (baseball) =

American baseball player and executive (born 1964)

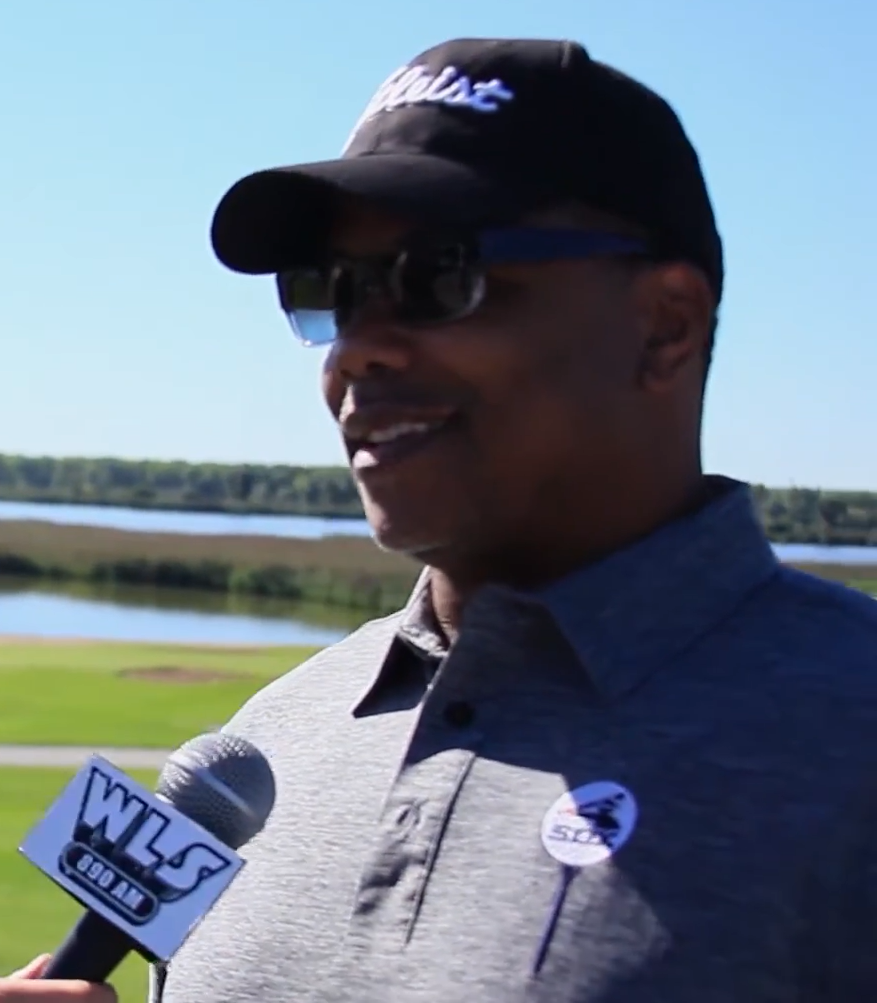
- Williams in 2016
- Outfielder
- Born: April 6, 1964 (age 62); Berkeley, California, U.S.
- Batted: Right Threw: Right

MLB debut
- September 2, 1986, for the Chicago White Sox

Last MLB appearance
- October 4, 1991, for the Montreal Expos

MLB statistics
- Batting average: .218
- Home runs: 27
- Runs batted in: 119
- Stats at Baseball Reference

Teams
- As player: Chicago White Sox (1986–1989); Detroit Tigers (1989–1990); Toronto Blue Jays (1990–1991); Montreal Expos (1991); As general manager: Chicago White Sox (2000–2012)

Kenneth Royal Williams (born April 6, 1964) is an American former outfielder in Major League Baseball and a former Executive Vice President of the Chicago White Sox.

== Playing career ==
Selected by the White Sox in the third round of the 1982 amateur draft, Williams made his debut in 1986 and spent three years in Chicago, primarily as a center fielder, before being traded to the Detroit Tigers in 1989. The Tigers waived him during the 1990 season, and he was claimed by the Toronto Blue Jays. Williams remained a bit player with the Blue Jays, usually coming on as a pinch-runner due to his speed. He was the starting center fielder when Dave Stieb threw his only no-hitter, the first no-hitter in Toronto history. He is best remembered as a player for a bizarre incident during the 1990 season, where a series of wild throwing errors resulted in him (on base as a pinch-runner) rounding third base and mauling over third base coach John McLaren, knocking him out in the process (Williams himself was winded, but eventually ended up scoring the run). This humorous clip would be played over and over in blooper reels for years to come. The Blue Jays then put him on waivers during the 1991 season, with Canada's other major league team, the Montreal Expos, picking him up. Williams decided to retire from baseball after being released by Montreal following the 1991 season.

== Administrative career ==
In November 1992, Williams rejoined the White Sox organization as a scout. Named special assistant to Sox chairman Jerry Reinsdorf in 1994, he spent some time as a studio analyst for Sox games on SportsChannel Chicago before becoming the team's director of minor league operations in 1995. In 1997, he was named vice-president of player development, a position in which he remained until 2000.

=== General manager ===
In October 2000, Williams replaced Ron Schueler as the general manager of the White Sox. Williams inherited Jerry Manuel as his first manager, who had just led them to 95 wins and a division title prior to Williams being promoted to GM. At the conclusion of the 2003 season Manuel was fired despite a winning record of 86–76. Williams then hired popular former Chicago shortstop Ozzie Guillén as the team's manager in 2003. Since becoming the White Sox GM, Williams has become known for his aggressive moves to bolster the Sox lineup. This reputation was strengthened following the 2004 season, when Williams completely made over the White Sox team by switching its on-field focus from home runs to pitching, defense, and speed. Accordingly, he acquired players which excelled in those areas, through free agent signings (Orlando Hernández, Dustin Hermanson, Jermaine Dye, A. J. Pierzynski, Tadahito Iguchi), trades (Scott Podsednik, José Contreras, Freddy García) and the farm system (Joe Crede, Aaron Rowand). Both Crede and Rowand were drafted by Schueler. Williams's off-season maneuvers were reflected in an extremely successful 2005 campaign for the South Siders, one in which they held the best record in all of baseball for most of the year, and finished with the best record in the AL to clinch their first AL Central Division title since 2000, their first American League pennant since 1959, and their first World Series since 1917.

In the off-season prior to the 2006 season, Williams set out to improve his world championship team further by acquiring pitcher Javier Vázquez from the Arizona Diamondbacks and slugger Jim Thome from the Philadelphia Phillies. In addition, Williams was cognizant of the large role that the bench played under Ozzie Guillén and solidified it by trading for Rob Mackowiak and Alex Cintrón. Because of these maneuvers, the White Sox were once again favored to win the 2006 American League Central. At the All-Star break, the White Sox were tied with the Detroit Tigers for first place and held a 6-game lead over the New York Yankees for the wild card. The lead evaporated in the second half of the season and despite winning 90 games, they fell short and finished in third place in their Division behind the Detroit Tigers and Minnesota Twins, thereby not making the playoffs.

In the offseason before the 2007 season, Williams traded away Freddy García to the Phillies and acquired prospects, Gavin Floyd and Gio González, in return. He also signed veteran free agent Darin Erstad to a one-year, $1 million contract. Williams has also stated that the team needs to get younger and improve its scouting. In early January 2008, he traded Gio González, Fautino de los Santos, and Ryan Sweeney for Nick Swisher.

With pitcher Jake Peavy being acquired at the trade deadline for the 2009 season, Williams was referred to by Gordon Edes of Yahoo Sports as a "stealth bomber" for his under the radar moves. On August 10, 2009, Williams made another under-the-radar move, by claiming OF Alex Ríos off the waivers from the Toronto Blue Jays. On September 29, 2011, Ozzie Guillén was traded to the Miami Marlins, along with minor league pitcher Ricardo Andres. The Marlins assumed the last year on Guillen's contract, in exchange for minor league pitchers Jhan Mariñez and Osvaldo Martinez. On October 6, 2011, Kenny Williams hired Robin Ventura as the new manager of the Chicago White Sox.

On October 26, 2012, Williams was promoted to executive vice president of the Chicago White Sox while assistant GM Rick Hahn was promoted to general manager.

On December 6, 2016, Williams oversaw the trade in which he sent Chris Sale to the Boston Red Sox for Michael Kopech, Yoan Moncada and Luis Alexander Basabe.

The White Sox fired Hahn and Williams on August 22, 2023.

==== Record as general manager ====
Team	Year	Regular season					Postseason			
Team	Year	Games	Won	Lost	Win %	Finish	Won	Lost	Win %	Result
CHW	2001	162	83	79	.512	3rd in AL Central	—	—	—	—
CHW	2002	162	81	81	.500	2nd in AL Central	—	—	—	—
CHW	2003	162	86	76	.531	2nd in AL Central	–	–	–	–
CHW	2004	162	83	79	.512	2nd in AL Central	–	–	–	–
CHW	2005	162	99	63	.611	1st in AL Central	11	1	.917	Won World Series (HOU)
CHW	2006	162	90	72	.556	3rd in AL Central	–	–	–	–
CHW	2007	162	72	90	.444	4th in AL Central	–	–	–	–
CHW	2008	163	89	74	.546	1st in AL Central	1	3	.250	Lost ALDS (TB)
CHW	2009	162	79	83	.488	3rd in AL Central	–	–	–	–
CHW	2010	162	88	74	.543	2nd in AL Central	–	–	–	–
CHW	2011	162	79	83	.488	3rd in AL Central	–	–	–	–
CHW	2012	162	85	77	.525	2nd in AL Central	–	–	–	–
Total		1,945	1,014	931	.521		12	4	.750	

== Personal life ==
Kenny resides in Naperville, Illinois. He has 5 children:

- TeMeka C. Williams, entrepreneur
- Dedrick Q. Williams, former professional scout for the White Sox
- Kenny Williams, Jr., former Wichita State University baseball player, 2008 draftee of the White Sox and current scout for the Arizona Diamondbacks
- Kyle Williams, former Kansas City Chiefs wide receiver and 2006 draftee of the White Sox
- Tyler Williams, GLOBALPROFITNET, former White Sox minor leaguer

Kenny also has one granddaughter. He remarried television journalist Zoraida Sambolin in July 2014.

Sporting positions
Preceded by Ron Schueler	Chicago White Sox General Manager; 2000–2012	Succeeded by Rick Hahn
