= Greg Walker (baseball) =

American baseball player and coach (born 1959)

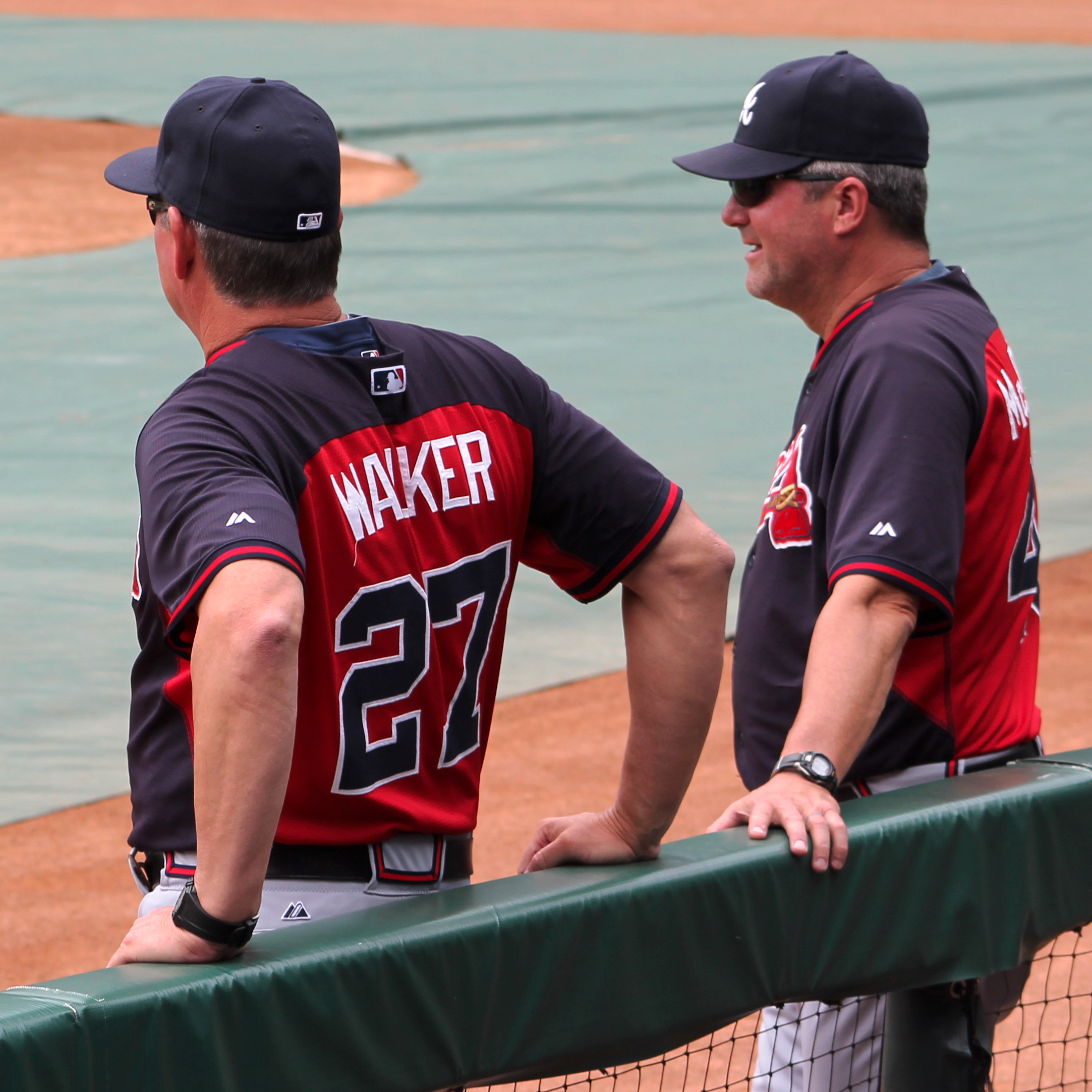
- Walker (left) with the Braves in 2014
- First baseman
- Born: October 6, 1959 (age 65); Douglas, Georgia, U.S.
- Batted: Left Threw: Right

MLB debut
- September 18, 1982, for the Chicago White Sox

Last MLB appearance
- July 1, 1990, for the Baltimore Orioles

MLB statistics
- Batting average: .260
- Home runs: 113
- Runs batted in: 444
- Stats at Baseball Reference

Teams
- As player: Chicago White Sox (1982–1990); Baltimore Orioles (1990); As coach: Chicago White Sox (2003–2011); Atlanta Braves (2012–2014)

Career highlights and awards
- World Series champion (2005)

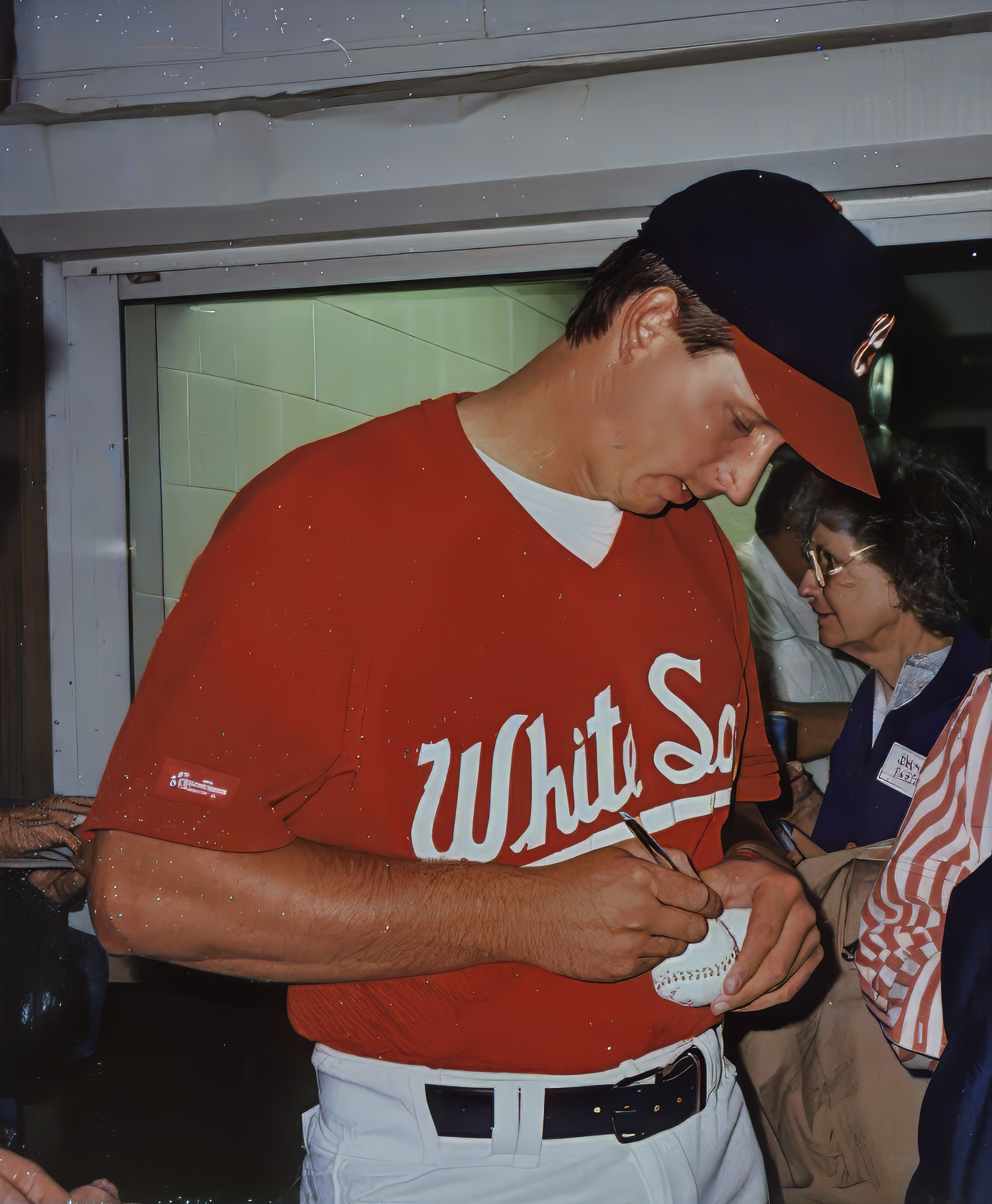
Walker in Chicago, 1989

Gregory Lee Walker (born October 6, 1959) is an American former professional baseball first baseman. He played in Major League Baseball (MLB) from 1982 to 1990. He is the former hitting coach of the Chicago White Sox, the team for which he played all but the last 14 games of his career, until leaving the White Sox to become the hitting coach for the Atlanta Braves, a position he held from 2012 until 2014.

== Career ==
=== Playing career ===
Walker was drafted by the Philadelphia Phillies in the 20th round (511th overall) of the 1977 Major League Baseball draft. He was selected by the White Sox in the Rule 5 draft in 1979. He was called up to the major leagues in 1982 and spent almost his entire MLB playing career with the White Sox. In 1988, Walker had a seizure on the field at Comiskey Park during fielding practice. He was released by Chicago early in the 1990 season and subsequently signed with the Baltimore Orioles. Baltimore released him shortly thereafter.

Over his career, Walker hit 113 home runs and drove in 444 runs while scoring 368 times in 855 career games.

=== Coaching career ===
When he began his coaching career, he did so with the White Sox Triple-A club in Charlotte. In 2003, he joined the parent club as hitting coach.

After nine seasons serving as the hitting coach of the Chicago White Sox, including their victory in the 2005 World Series, it was announced on October 21, 2011, that Walker was hired by the Atlanta Braves to serve as their hitting coach for the 2012 season. Walker filled the role vacated by the firing of Larry Parrish. Walker resigned in September 2014, as the team compiled a .241 batting average, 573 runs, 123 home runs, and 1,369 strikeouts, struggling mightily in the final month of the season. He returned to the Braves as a special assistant of baseball operations in February 2015.

== Personal ==
Walker is a cousin of Harry Spilman, a former MLB player.
