= Mélido Pérez =

Dominican baseball player (born 1966)

- Pitcher
- Born: February 15, 1966 (age 60); San Cristóbal, Dominican Republic
- Batted: Right Threw: Right

MLB debut
- September 4, 1987, for the Kansas City Royals

Last MLB appearance
- September 13, 1995, for the New York Yankees

MLB statistics
- Win–loss record: 78–85
- Earned run average: 4.17
- Strikeouts: 1,092
- Stats at Baseball Reference

Teams
- Kansas City Royals (1987); Chicago White Sox (1988–1991); New York Yankees (1992–1995)

Mélido Turpen Gross Pérez (born February 15, 1966) is a Dominican former right-handed Major League Baseball pitcher who played from 1987 through 1995 for the Kansas City Royals, Chicago White Sox, and New York Yankees.

== Career ==
=== Kansas City Royals ===
The Kansas City Royals signed Melido as an undrafted free agent in 1983. He made his major league debut for the Kansas City Royals on September 4, 1987. In that game, Pérez pitched seven innings of shutout ball for the victory. On December 10, 1987, Melido was traded with Chuck Mount (minors), John Davis and Greg Hibbard to the Chicago White Sox for Floyd Bannister and Dave Cochrane.

=== Chicago White Sox ===
In 4 seasons with the White Sox, Melido appeared in 147 games, starting 106, and pitching 713 innings while compiling a 44–45 record; all the highest cumulative totals he accrued with one team during his career.

In his first season at Chicago, Perez started 32 games, posting a 12–10 record with a 3.79 ERA. He finished 6th in the American League Rookie of the Year Award voting.

Perez was the White Sox's Opening Day starter in 1990. Later that season, he threw a no-hitter against the New York Yankees in a game shortened to 7 innings by rain. The following year, Major League Baseball revised its definition of a no-hitter, stating that a pitcher must complete at least 9 innings to achieve the feat, retroactively disallowing Perez's and 35 other shortened no-hitters, as well as the Yankees' Andy Hawkins' no-hitter against the White Sox earlier that year.

On January 10, 1992, Melido was traded by the Chicago White Sox with Domingo Jean and Bob Wickman to the New York Yankees for Steve Sax.

=== New York Yankees ===
In 1992, Melido had his best year statistically, striking out 218 batters - second in the American League behind Randy Johnson - and was third in the AL with 7.922 strikeout average per 9 innings while maintaining a 2.87 ERA. His career with the Yankees ended at the end of the 1995 season after a tear in his right throwing elbow.

=== Cleveland Indians ===
In 1997, Melido was invited to the Cleveland Indians spring training. He did not make the cut for the season roster.

=== Post career ===
Melido currently lives in Santo Domingo, Dominican Republic with his wife and three children. He earned an estimated $16 million in his nine-year career. He is known for giving up Manny Ramírez's first career home run. Perez is the mayor of San Gregorio de Nigua in the Dominican Republic.

== See also ==
- Carlos Pérez (younger brother)
- Pascual Pérez (older brother)
- Yorkis Pérez (cousin)
