= John Davis (pitcher, born 1963) =

American baseball player (born 1963)

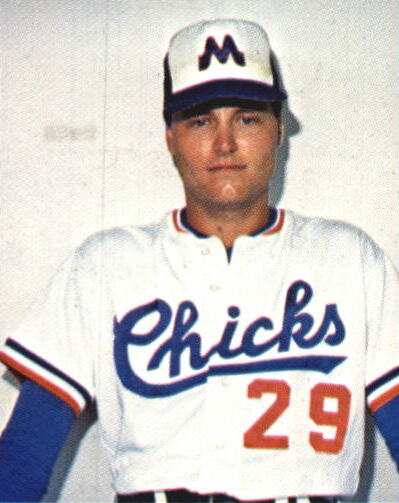
- Davis with the Memphis Chicks c. 1986
- Pitcher
- Born: January 5, 1963 (age 63); Chicago, Illinois, U.S.
- Batted: Right Threw: Right

MLB debut
- July 24, 1987, for the Kansas City Royals

Last MLB appearance
- August 15, 1990, for the San Diego Padres

MLB statistics
- Win–loss record: 7–9
- Earned run average: 4.92
- Strikeouts: 73
- Stats at Baseball Reference

Teams
- Kansas City Royals (1987); Chicago White Sox (1988–1989); San Diego Padres (1990)

John Kirk Davis (born January 5, 1963) is an American former Major League Baseball pitcher. He played during four seasons at the major league level for the Kansas City Royals, Chicago White Sox, and San Diego Padres. He was drafted by the Royals in the 7th round of the 1981 Major League Baseball draft. Davis played his first professional season with their Rookie league Gulf Coast Royals in 1981, and his last season with the White Sox's Triple-A affiliate, the Nashville Sounds, in 1995.
