= 1990 Chicago White Sox season =

1990 Chicago White Sox
- League: American League
- Division: West
- Ballpark: Comiskey Park
- City: Chicago
- Owners: Jerry Reinsdorf
- General managers: Larry Himes
- Managers: Jeff Torborg
- Television: WGN-TV; SportsChannel Chicago (Ken Harrelson, Tom Paciorek, Jim Durham)
- Radio: WMAQ (AM) (John Rooney, Wayne Hagin); WTAQ (Frank Diaz, Chico Carrasquel)

The 1990 Chicago White Sox season was the White Sox's 91st season. The team finished with a record of 94–68, placing them second in the American League West, nine games behind the first-place Oakland Athletics. The White Sox played their final season at the aging Comiskey Park in 1990, before moving to the new Comiskey Park the next season.

== Regular season ==
In the summer of 1990, Michael Jordan took batting practice at Comiskey Park. The following year, Upper Deck created a baseball card of Jordan, numbered SP1.

The White Sox and Texas Rangers were involved in the longest rain delay in baseball history, at seven hours and 23 minutes, at Comiskey Park on August 12. Factoring into the delay's length was the White Sox's insistence that the game be rescheduled at Comiskey four days later when both teams were idle and not at Arlington Stadium the subsequent weekend, which was rejected by the Rangers. The gamesmanship between the two sides resulted in the contest eventually being played as part of a twi-night doubleheader at Arlington on August 17.

Bobby Thigpen had the best season of his career with the White Sox in 1990, setting a major league record of 57 saves. He also maintained a 1.83 ERA and was named to the AL All-Star team. He also blew eight saves that season, including two three-run leads.

On July 2, in anticipation of the team's upcoming move to new Comiskey Park, the White Sox unveiled new team colors of black and silver with uniforms based on the ones worn between 1959 and the early 1970s, featuring a return of pinstripes to the home version. The new uniforms were originally scheduled to debut the following season, but its popularity with fans resulted in the White Sox officially making the change beginning with the first game of the final homestand of the 1990 campaign on September 25. The team instantly jumped to the top of MLB merchandise sales.

=== Season standings ===
AL West
Team	W	L	Pct.	GB	Home	Road
Oakland Athletics	103	59	.636	—	51‍–‍30	52‍–‍29
Chicago White Sox	94	68	.580	9	49‍–‍31	45‍–‍37
Texas Rangers	83	79	.512	20	47‍–‍35	36‍–‍44
California Angels	80	82	.494	23	42‍–‍39	38‍–‍43
Seattle Mariners	77	85	.475	26	38‍–‍43	39‍–‍42
Kansas City Royals	75	86	.466	27½	45‍–‍36	30‍–‍50
Minnesota Twins	74	88	.457	29	41‍–‍40	33‍–‍48

=== Record vs. opponents ===
1990 American League record Sources:
Team	BAL	BOS	CAL	CWS	CLE	DET	KC	MIL	MIN	NYY	OAK	SEA	TEX	TOR
Baltimore	—	4–9	7–5	6–6	6–7	6–7	8–3	7–6	6–6	6–7	4–8	3–9	8–4	5–8
Boston	9–4	—	7–5	6–6	9–4	8–5	4–8	5–8	4–8	9–4	4–8	8–4	5–7	10–3
California	5–7	5–7	—	5–8	7–5	5–7	7–6	7–5	9–4	6–6	4–9	5–8	8–5	7–5
Chicago	6–6	6–6	8–5	—	5–7	5–7	9–4	10–2	7–6	10–2	8–5	8–5	7–6	5–7
Cleveland	7–6	4–9	5–7	7–5	—	5–8	6–6	9–4	7–5	5–8	4–8	7–5	7–5	4–9
Detroit	7–6	5–8	7–5	7–5	8–5	—	5–7	3–10	6–6	7–6	6–6	7–5	6–6	5–8
Kansas City	3–8	8–4	6–7	4–9	6–6	7–5	—	4–8	8–5	8–4	4–9	7–6	5–8	5–7
Milwaukee	6–7	8–5	5–7	2–10	4–9	10–3	8–4	—	4–8	6–7	5–7	4–8	5–7	7–6
Minnesota	6–6	8–4	4–9	6–7	5–7	6–6	5–8	8–4	—	6–6	6–7	6–7	5–8	3–9
New York	7–6	4–9	6–6	2–10	8–5	6–7	4–8	7–6	6–6	—	0–12	9–3	3–9	5–8
Oakland	8–4	8–4	9–4	5–8	8–4	6–6	9–4	7–5	7–6	12–0	—	9–4	8–5	7–5
Seattle	9–3	4–8	8–5	5–8	5–7	5–7	6–7	8–4	7–6	3–9	4–9	—	7–6	6–6
Texas	4–8	7–5	5–8	6–7	5–7	6–6	8–5	7–5	8–5	9–3	5–8	6–7	—	7–5
Toronto	8–5	3–10	5–7	7–5	9–4	8–5	7–5	6–7	9–3	8–5	5–7	6–6	5–7	—

=== 1990 Opening Day lineup ===
- Lance Johnson, CF
- Scott Fletcher, 2B
- Iván Calderón, LF
- Greg Walker, DH
- Carlton Fisk, C
- Carlos Martínez, 1B
- Robin Ventura, 3B
- Sammy Sosa, RF
- Ozzie Guillén, SS
- Mélido Pérez, P

=== Notable transactions ===
- June 4, 1990: Alex Fernandez was drafted by the White Sox in the first round of the 1990 amateur draft.
- June 4, 1990: Bob Wickman was drafted by the White Sox in the second round of the 1990 amateur draft; he was signed to the team on June 6, 1990.
- June 4, 1990: Ray Durham was drafted by the White Sox in the fifth round of the 1990 amateur draft; he was signed to the team on June 5, 1990.
- June 4, 1990: Jason Bere was drafted by the White Sox in the 36th round of the 1990 amateur draft; he was signed to the team on June 6, 1990.
- July 30, 1990: Phil Bradley was traded by the Baltimore Orioles to the White Sox for Ron Kittle.

=== No Hitter ===
- July 1, 1990 – New York Yankees pitcher Andy Hawkins threw a no-hitter against the White Sox and lost the game. A scoreless game until the bottom of the eighth inning, Sammy Sosa started the rally by hitting a ground ball that Yankee third basemen Mike Blowers bobbled. Initially it was ruled a hit. Yankee manager Stump Merrill was standing on the top of the dugout steps barking up in the direction of the press box. The play was quickly changed to an error on Blowers. Sosa then stole second base. Ozzie Guillén and Lance Johnson both then drew walks to load the bases. The next batter, Robin Ventura, hit a fly ball that eluded Yankees left fielder Jim Leyritz, allowing three unearned runs to score. The next batter, Iván Calderón, then lifted a fly ball to right field that was dropped by Jesse Barfield, making the score 4–0.

==== Line Score ====
July 1, Comiskey Park, Chicago, Illinois

Team	1	2	3	4	5	6	7	8	9	R	H	E
New York	0	0	0	0	0	0	0	0	0	0	4	3
Chicago	0	0	0	0	0	0	0	4	x	4	0	2
W: Barry Jones (10–1) L: Andy Hawkins (1–5)
Attendance: 30,642 Time: 2:34

==== Batting ====
New York Yankees	AB	R	H	RBI	Chicago White Sox	AB	R	H	RBI
Kelly, cf	4	0	0	0	Johnson, cf	3	1	0	0
Sax, 2b	4	0	0	0	Ventura, 3b	4	1	0	0
Mattingly, 1b	4	0	0	0	Calderon, dh	3	0	0	0
Balboni, dh	4	0	0	0	Pasqua, lf	4	0	0	0
Tolleson, pr, dh	0	0	0	0	Gallagher, lf	0	0	0	0
Barfield, rf	4	0	1	0	Kittle, 1b	3	0	0	0
Leyritz, lf	3	0	1	0	Lyons, 1b	0	0	0	0
Blowers, 3b	3	0	0	0	Karkovice, c	2	0	0	0
Geren, c	3	0	1	0	Fletcher, 2b	2	0	0	0
Espinoza, ss	2	0	1	0	Sosa, rf	3	1	0	0
NONE	0	0	0	0	Guillen, ss	2	1	0	0
Totals	31	0	4	0	Totals	26	4	0	0

==== Pitching ====
New York Yankees	IP	H	R	ER	BB	SO
Hawkins, L (1–5)	8.0	0	4	0	5	3

Chicago White Sox	IP	H	R	ER	BB	SO
Hibbard	7.0	4	0	0	0	4
Jones W (10–1)	1.0	0	0	0	0	1
Radinsky	1.0	0	0	0	0	0

=== Turn Back the Clock Day ===
On July 11, 1990, as part of the celebration of Comiskey Park, the White Sox played a Turn Back the Clock game against the Milwaukee Brewers. The White Sox wore their 1917 home uniforms. This was the first Turn Back the Clock game in the major leagues and started what has become a popular promotion. The club turned off the electronic scoreboards and public address system. They constructed a special manually operated scoreboard in center field for the day and even the grounds-crew wore period costume. General admission tickets were sold for $0.50, popcorn was a nickel, and the stadium organ was shut down for the game.

==== Line Score ====
July 11, Comiskey Park, Chicago, Illinois

Team	1	2	3	4	5	6	7	8	9	10	11	12	13	R	H	E
Milwaukee	0	0	3	0	0	0	0	6	0	0	0	0	3	12	15	1
Chicago	4	0	3	0	2	0	0	0	0	0	0	0	0	9	13	0
W: Dan Plesac (1–3) L: Donn Pall (0–3)
Home Runs: Yount (8) Attendance: 40,666 Time: 4:44

==== Batting ====
Milwaukee Brewers	AB	R	H	RBI	Chicago White Sox	AB	R	H	RBI
Gantner, 2b	7	1	3	2	Johnson, cf	7	1	2	0
Sheffield, 3b	5	2	3	0	Ventura, 3b	5	0	0	0
Yount, cf	4	2	2	3	Gallagher, ph	1	0	0	0
Parker, dh	5	1	1	0	Grebeck, 3b	0	0	0	0
Brock, 1b	3	0	0	0	Calderon, dh	6	1	2	1
Deer, ph, 1b	2	1	0	1	Kittle, 1b	6	1	1	0
Vaughn, lf	4	1	2	2	Fisk, c	4	2	1	0
Felder, lf	2	1	1	0	Lyons, lf	6	0	1	1
Surhoff, c	5	2	1	2	Fletcher, 2b	6	2	3	2
Hamilton, rf	6	1	2	2	Sosa, rf	6	2	2	3
Spiers, ss	4	0	0	0	Guillen, ss	6	0	1	1
Sveum, ph, ss	2	0	0	0	NONE	0	0	0	0
Diaz, ss	0	0	0	0	NONE	0	0	0	0
Totals	49	12	15	12	Totals	53	9	13	8

=== Roster ===
1990 Chicago White Sox
Roster
Pitchers: 45 Wayne Edwards; 32 Alex Fernandez; 27 Greg Hibbard; 57 Shawn Hillegas; 50 Barry Jones; 36 Eric King; 52 Jerry Kutzler; 47 Bill Long; 40,29 Jack McDowell; 30 Donn Pall; 34 Ken Patterson; 33 Mélido Pérez; 43 Adam Peterson; 31 Scott Radinsky; 47 Steve Rosenberg; 37 Bobby Thigpen	Catchers: 72 Carlton Fisk; 20 Ron Karkovice; 26 Jerry Willard; Infielders: 7 Scott Fletcher; 14 Craig Grebeck; 13 Ozzie Guillén; 42 Ron Kittle; 12 Steve Lyons; 24 Carlos Martínez; 15,35 Frank Thomas; 23 Robin Ventura; 29 Greg Walker	Outfielders: 8 Daryl Boston; 8 Phil Bradley; 22 Iván Calderón; 17 Dave Gallagher; 1 Lance Johnson; 44 Dan Pasqua; 28 Rodney McCray; 25 Sammy Sosa; Other batters: 21 Matt Stark	Manager: 10 Jeff Torborg; Coaches: 18 Terry Bevington (Third Base); 5 Ron Clark (First Base); 32 Sammy Ellis (Pitching); 54 Barry Foote (Bullpen Catcher); 6 Walt Hriniak (Hitting); 53 Dave LaRoche (Bullpen); ? Joe Nossek (Bench)

== Player stats ==
=== Batting ===
Note: G = Games played; AB = At bats; R = Runs scored; H = Hits; 2B = Doubles; 3B = Triples; HR = Home runs; RBI = Runs batted in; BB = Base on balls; SO = Strikeouts; AVG = Batting average; SB = Stolen bases

Player	G	AB	R	H	2B	3B	HR	RBI	BB	SO	AVG	SB
Daryl Boston, RF	5	1	0	0	0	0	0	0	0	0	.000	1
Phil Bradley, OF, DH	45	133	20	30	5	1	0	5	20	26	.226	7
Iván Calderón, LF	158	607	85	166	44	2	14	74	51	79	.273	32
Carlton Fisk, C	137	452	65	129	21	0	18	65	61	73	.285	7
Scott Fletcher, 2B	151	509	54	123	18	3	4	56	45	63	.242	1
Dave Gallagher, OF	45	75	5	21	3	1	0	5	3	9	.280	0
Craig Grebeck, 3B, SS, 2B	59	119	7	20	3	1	1	9	8	24	.168	0
Ozzie Guillén, SS	160	516	61	144	21	4	1	58	26	37	.279	13
Lance Johnson, CF	151	541	76	154	18	9	1	51	33	45	.285	36
Ron Karkovice, C	68	183	30	45	10	0	6	20	16	52	.246	2
Ron Kittle, DH, 1B	83	277	29	68	14	0	16	43	24	77	.245	0
Steve Lyons, 1B, 2B, OF	94	146	22	28	6	1	1	11	10	41	.192	1
Carlos Martinez, 1B	92	272	18	61	6	5	4	24	10	40	.224	0
Rodney McCray, OF	32	6	8	0	0	0	0	0	1	4	.000	6
Dan Pasqua, DH, OF	112	325	43	89	27	3	13	58	37	66	.274	1
Sammy Sosa, RF	153	532	72	124	26	10	15	70	33	150	.233	32
Matt Stark, DH	8	16	0	4	1	0	0	3	1	6	.250	0
Frank Thomas, 1B, DH	60	191	39	63	11	3	7	31	44	54	.330	1
Robin Ventura, 3B	150	493	48	123	17	1	5	54	55	53	.249	1
Greg Walker, 1B, DH	2	5	0	1	0	0	0	0	0	2	.200	0
Jerry Willard, C	3	3	0	0	0	0	0	0	0	2	.000	0
Team totals	162	5402	682	1393	251	44	106	637	478	903	.258	140

=== Pitching ===
Note: W = Wins; L = Losses; ERA = Earned run average; G = Games pitched; GS = Games started; SV = Saves; IP = Innings pitched; H = Hits allowed; R = Runs allowed; ER = Earned runs allowed; HR = Home runs allowed; BB = Walks allowed; K = Strikeouts

Player	W	L	ERA	G	GS	SV	IP	H	R	ER	HR	BB	K
Wayne Edwards	5	3	3.22	42	5	2	95.0	81	39	34	6	43	63
Alex Fernandez	5	5	3.80	13	13	0	87.2	89	40	37	6	34	61
Greg Hibbard	14	9	3.16	33	33	0	211.0	202	80	74	11	57	92
Shawn Hillegas	0	0	0.79	7	0	0	11.1	4	1	1	0	6	5
Barry Jones	11	4	2.31	65	0	1	74.0	62	20	19	2	40	45
Eric King	12	4	3.28	25	25	0	151.0	135	59	55	10	40	70
Jerry Kutzler	2	1	6.03	7	7	0	31.1	38	23	21	2	15	21
Bill Long	0	1	6.35	4	0	0	5.2	6	5	4	2	2	2
Steve Lyons	0	0	4.50	1	0	0	2.0	2	1	1	0	4	1
Jack McDowell	14	9	3.82	33	33	0	205.0	189	93	87	20	77	165
Donn Pall	3	5	3.32	56	0	2	76.0	63	33	28	7	30	39
Ken Patterson	2	1	3.39	43	0	2	66.1	58	27	25	6	35	40
Mélido Pérez	13	14	4.61	35	35	0	197.0	177	111	101	14	87	161
Adam Peterson	2	5	4.55	20	11	0	85.0	90	46	43	12	26	29
Scott Radinsky	6	1	4.82	62	0	4	52.1	47	29	28	1	37	46
Steve Rosenberg	1	0	5.40	6	0	0	10.0	10	6	6	2	5	4
Bobby Thigpen	4	6	1.83	77	0	57	88.2	60	20	18	5	35	70
Team totals	94	68	3.61	162	162	68	1449.1	1313	633	581	106	575	914

== Awards and honors ==
- Bobby Thigpen, Major League Record, 57 saves in one season
- Bobby Thigpen, MLB All-Star Game, reserve
- Jeff Torborg, MLB All-Star Game, bench coach
- Jeff Torborg, Associated Press Manager of the Year

== Farm system ==
Level	Team	League	Manager
AAA	Vancouver Canadians	Pacific Coast League	Marv Foley
AA	Birmingham Barons	Southern League	Ken Berry
A	Sarasota White Sox	Florida State League	Tony Franklin
A	South Bend White Sox	Midwest League	Rick Patterson
A-Short Season	Utica Blue Sox	New York–Penn League	Tommy Thompson
Rookie	GCL White Sox	Gulf Coast League	Mike Gellinger
