= 1987 Chicago White Sox season =

1987 Chicago White Sox
- League: American League
- Division: West
- Ballpark: Comiskey Park
- City: Chicago
- Owners: Jerry Reinsdorf
- General managers: Larry Himes
- Managers: Jim Fregosi
- Television: WFLD; Sportsvision (Don Drysdale, Frank Messer)
- Radio: WMAQ (AM) (Del Crandall, Lorn Brown); WTAQ (Frank Diaz, Jose Manuel Flores)

The 1987 Chicago White Sox season was the White Sox's 88th season. They finished with a record of 77–85, giving them fifth place in the American League West, 8 games behind of the first place Minnesota Twins. The White Sox spent most of 1987 in the cellar, occupying last place from June 9 until September 30, but won 9 of their last 10 to pass the Texas Rangers and California Angels in the season's final week.

The club introduced new uniforms, returning to button-front and belted pants for the first time since 1975. The two-tone cap (navy crown, scarlet bill) sported a cursive "C", the first time the word "SOX" was not displayed on team caps for the first time since 1950.

== Offseason ==
- December 11, 1986 – The Chicago White Sox send Gene Nelson and Bruce Tanner to the Oakland Athletics in exchange for Donnie Hill.
- January 5, 1987: Randy Velarde was traded by the Chicago White Sox with Pete Filson to the New York Yankees for Scott Nielsen and Mike Soper (minors).
- January 21, 1987: Jerry Royster was signed as a free agent with the Chicago White Sox.

== Regular season ==
=== Season standings ===
AL West
Team	W	L	Pct.	GB	Home	Road
Minnesota Twins	85	77	.525	—	56‍–‍25	29‍–‍52
Kansas City Royals	83	79	.512	2	46‍–‍35	37‍–‍44
Oakland Athletics	81	81	.500	4	42‍–‍39	39‍–‍42
Seattle Mariners	78	84	.481	7	40‍–‍41	38‍–‍43
Chicago White Sox	77	85	.475	8	38‍–‍43	39‍–‍42
Texas Rangers	75	87	.463	10	43‍–‍38	32‍–‍49
California Angels	75	87	.463	10	38‍–‍43	37‍–‍44

=== Record vs. opponents ===
1987 American League record Sources:
Team	BAL	BOS	CAL	CWS	CLE	DET	KC	MIL	MIN	NYY	OAK	SEA	TEX	TOR
Baltimore	—	1–12	9–3	8–4	7–6	4–9	9–3	2–11	5–7	3–10	7–5	4–8	7–5	1–12
Boston	12–1	—	4–8	3–9	7–6	2–11	6–6	6–7	7–5	7–6	4–8	7–5	7–5	6–7
California	3–9	8–4	—	8–5	7–5	3–9	5–8	7–5	8–5	3–9	6–7	7–6	5–8	5–7
Chicago	4–8	9–3	5–8	—	7–5	3–9	6–7	6–6	6–7	5–7	9–4	6–7	7–6	4–8
Cleveland	6–7	6–7	5–7	5–7	—	4–9	6–6	4–9	3–9	6–7	4–8	5–7	2–10	5–8
Detroit	9–4	11–2	9–3	9–3	9–4	—	5–7	6–7	8–4	5–8	5–7	7–5	8–4	7–6
Kansas City	3–9	6–6	8–5	7–6	6–6	7–5	—	4–8	8–5	5–7	5–8	9–4	7–6	8–4
Milwaukee	11–2	7–6	5–7	6–6	9–4	7–6	8–4	—	3–9	7–6	6–6	4–8	9–3	9–4
Minnesota	7–5	5–7	5–8	7–6	9–3	4–8	5–8	9–3	—	6–6	10–3	9–4	6–7	3–9
New York	10–3	6–7	9–3	7–5	7–6	8–5	7–5	6–7	6–6	—	5–7	7–5	5–7	6–7
Oakland	5–7	8–4	7–6	4–9	8–4	7–5	8–5	6–6	3–10	7–5	—	5–8	6–7	7–5
Seattle	8–4	5–7	6–7	7–6	7–5	5–7	4–9	8–4	4–9	5–7	8–5	—	9–4	2–10
Texas	5–7	5–7	8–5	6–7	10–2	4–8	6–7	3–9	7–6	7–5	7–6	4–9	—	3–9
Toronto	12–1	7–6	7–5	8–4	8–5	6–7	4–8	4–9	9–3	7–6	5–7	10–2	9–3	—

=== Opening Day lineup ===
- Gary Redus, CF
- Donnie Hill, 2B
- Harold Baines, RF
- Carlton Fisk, DH
- Greg Walker, 1B
- Iván Calderón, LF
- Tim Hulett, 2B
- Ozzie Guillén, SS
- Ron Karkovice, C
- Richard Dotson, P

=== Notable transactions ===
- June 2, 1987: 1987 Major League Baseball draft
  - Jack McDowell was drafted by the White Sox in the 1st round (5th pick). Player signed July 29, 1987.
  - Buddy Groom was drafted by the White Sox in the 12th round. Player signed June 9, 1987.
- July 13, 1987: Mike Maksudian was signed by the Chicago White Sox as an amateur free agent.
- August 6, 1987: Johnnie LeMaster was signed as a free agent with the Chicago White Sox.
- August 26, 1987: Jerry Royster was traded by the Chicago White Sox with Mike Soper (minors) to the New York Yankees for a player to be named later and Ken Patterson. The New York Yankees sent Jeff Pries (minors) (September 19, 1987) to the Chicago White Sox to complete the trade.

=== Roster ===
1987 Chicago White Sox
Roster
Pitchers: 33 Neil Allen; 19,24 Floyd Bannister; 53 Ralph Citarella; 47 Bryan Clark; 52 Joel Davis; 26 José DeLeón; 34 Richard Dotson; 43 Bob James; 38 Dave LaPoint; 46 Bill Long; 40 Jack McDowell; 50 Joel McKeon; 41 Scott Nielsen; 48 John Pawlowski; 43 Adam Peterson; 36 Ray Searage; 37 Bobby Thigpen; 40,45 Jim Winn	Catchers: 72 Carlton Fisk; 25 Ron Hassey; 5 Ron Karkovice; 20 Bill Lindsey; Infielders: 13 Ozzie Guillén; 15 Donnie Hill; 32 Tim Hulett; 44 Pat Keedy; 12 Steve Lyons; 10 Fred Manrique; 1 Jerry Royster; 29 Greg Walker	Outfielders: 3 Harold Baines; 8 Daryl Boston; 22 Iván Calderón; 17 Jerry Hairston; 21 Gary Redus; 7 Kenny Williams	Manager: 16 Jim Fregosi; Coaches: 27 Dick Bosman; 35 Ed Brinkman; 54 Deron Johnson; 51 Art Kusnyer; 49 Dyar Miller; 28 Doug Rader

== Player stats ==
=== Batting ===
Note: G = Games played; AB = At bats; R = Runs scored; H = Hits; 2B = Doubles; 3B = Triples; HR = Home runs; RBI = Runs batted in; BB = Base on balls; SO = Strikeouts; AVG = Batting average; SB = Stolen bases

Player	G	AB	R	H	2B	3B	HR	RBI	BB	SO	AVG	SB
Harold Baines, DH, RF	132	505	59	148	26	4	20	93	46	82	.293	0
Daryl Boston, OF	103	337	51	87	21	2	10	29	25	68	.258	12
Iván Calderón, OF, DH	144	542	93	159	38	2	28	83	60	109	.293	10
Carlton Fisk, C, 1B, DH, LF	135	454	68	116	22	1	23	71	39	72	.256	1
Ozzie Guillén, SS	149	560	64	156	22	7	2	51	22	52	.279	25
Jerry Hairston, LF, DH, 1B	66	126	14	29	8	0	5	20	25	25	.230	0
Ron Hassey, C, DH	49	145	15	31	9	0	3	12	17	11	.214	0
Donnie Hill, 2B, 3B	111	410	57	98	14	6	9	46	30	35	.239	1
Tim Hulett, 3B, 2B	68	240	20	52	10	0	7	28	10	41	.217	0
Ron Karkovice, C	39	85	7	6	0	0	2	7	7	40	.071	3
Pat Keedy, 3B, 2B, 1B	17	41	6	7	1	0	2	2	2	14	.171	1
Bill Lindsey, C	9	16	2	3	0	0	0	1	0	3	.188	0
Steve Lyons, 3B, OF	76	193	26	54	11	1	1	19	12	37	.280	3
Fred Manrique, 2B, SS	115	298	30	77	13	3	4	29	19	69	.258	5
Gary Redus, OF	130	475	78	112	26	6	12	48	69	90	.236	52
Jerry Royster, 3B, LF, 2B, DH	55	154	25	37	11	0	7	23	19	28	.240	2
Greg Walker, 1B, DH	157	566	85	145	33	2	27	94	75	112	.256	2
Kenny Williams, CF, RF	116	391	48	110	18	2	11	50	10	83	.281	21
Team totals	162	5538	748	1427	283	36	173	706	487	971	.258	138

=== Pitching ===
Note: W = Wins; L = Losses; ERA = Earned run average; G = Games pitched; GS = Games started; SV = Saves; IP = Innings pitched; H = Hits allowed; R = Runs allowed; ER = Earned runs allowed; HR = Home runs allowed; BB = Walks allowed; K = Strikeouts

Player	W	L	ERA	G	GS	SV	IP	H	R	ER	HR	BB	K
Neil Allen	0	7	7.07	15	10	0	49.2	74	40	39	6	26	26
Floyd Bannister	16	11	3.58	34	34	0	228.2	216	100	91	38	49	124
Ralph Citarella	0	0	7.36	5	0	0	11.0	13	9	9	4	4	33
Bryan Clark	0	0	2.41	11	0	0	18.2	19	5	5	1	8	8
Joel Davis	1	5	5.73	13	9	0	55.0	56	35	35	7	30	25
José DeLeón	11	12	4.02	33	31	0	206.0	177	106	92	24	101	153
Richard Dotson	11	12	4.17	31	31	0	211.1	201	109	98	24	88	114
Bob James	4	6	4.67	43	0	10	54.0	54	32	28	10	23	34
Dave LaPoint	6	3	2.94	14	12	0	82.2	69	29	27	7	31	43
Bill Long	8	8	4.37	29	23	1	169.0	179	85	82	20	29	72
Jack McDowell	3	0	1.93	4	4	0	28.0	16	6	6	1	6	15
Joel McKeon	1	2	9.43	13	0	0	21.0	27	22	22	8	15	14
Scott Nielsen	3	5	6.24	19	7	2	66.1	83	48	46	9	26	23
John Pawlowski	0	0	4.91	2	0	0	3.2	7	2	2	0	3	2
Adam Peterson	0	0	13.50	1	1	0	4.0	8	6	6	1	3	1
Ray Searage	2	3	4.20	58	0	2	55.2	56	28	26	9	27	33
Bobby Thigpen	7	5	2.73	51	0	16	89.0	86	30	27	10	29	52
Jim Winn	4	6	4.79	56	0	6	94.0	95	54	50	10	67	44
Team totals	77	85	4.30	162	162	37	1447.2	1436	746	691	189	565	792

== Farm system ==
Level	Team	League	Manager
AAA	Hawaii Islanders	Pacific Coast League	Bob Bailey
AA	Birmingham Barons	Southern League	Rico Petrocelli
A	Peninsula White Sox	Carolina League	Marv Foley
A	Daytona Beach Admirals	Florida State League	Marc Hill
Rookie	GCL White Sox	Gulf Coast League	Steve Dillard

LEAGUE CHAMPIONS: Birmingham
