= 1986 Oakland Athletics season =

1986 Oakland Athletics
- League: American League
- Division: West
- Ballpark: Oakland–Alameda County Coliseum
- City: Oakland, California
- Record: 76–86 (.469)
- Divisional place: 4th
- Owners: Walter A. Haas, Jr.
- General managers: Sandy Alderson
- Managers: Jackie Moore, Jeff Newman, Tony La Russa
- Television: KPIX (Bill King, Lon Simmons, Ray Fosse)
- Radio: KSFO (Bill King, Lon Simmons, Ted Robinson); KBRG (Amaury Pi-Gonzalez, Julio Gonzalez)

The 1986 Oakland Athletics season was the 86th season for the Oakland Athletics franchise, all as members of the American League, and their 19th season in Oakland. The Athletics finished third in the American League West with a record of 76 wins and 86 losses.

== Offseason ==
- November 13, 1985: Bárbaro Garbey was traded by the Detroit Tigers to the Oakland Athletics for Dave Collins.
- December 10, 1985: Mike Heath and Tim Conroy were traded by the Athletics to the St. Louis Cardinals for Joaquín Andújar.
- January 17, 1986: Phil Stephenson and Bob Bathe (minors) were traded by the Athletics to the Chicago Cubs for Gary Jones (minors) and John Cox (minors).
- February 1, 1986: Lenn Sakata was signed as a free agent with the Oakland Athletics.
- March 21, 1986: Bárbaro Garbey was released by the Oakland Athletics.
- March 30, 1986: Charlie O'Brien, Steve Kiefer, Mike Fulmer (minors) and Pete Kendrick (minors) were traded by the Athletics to the Milwaukee Brewers for Moose Haas.

== Regular season ==
- August 22, 1986: Mark McGwire made his major league debut against the New York Yankees. He had three at-bats and no hits. Three days later, McGwire hit his first major league home run off Walt Terrell of the Detroit Tigers in an 8-4 win.
- September 12, 1986: In a game against the Cleveland Indians, Terry Steinbach hit a home run in his first Major League at-bat. Steinbach became the 54th player to achieve the feat.

=== Season standings ===
AL West
Team	W	L	Pct.	GB	Home	Road
California Angels	92	70	.568	—	50‍–‍32	42‍–‍38
Texas Rangers	87	75	.537	5	51‍–‍30	36‍–‍45
Kansas City Royals	76	86	.469	16	45‍–‍36	31‍–‍50
Oakland Athletics	76	86	.469	16	47‍–‍36	29‍–‍50
Chicago White Sox	72	90	.444	20	41‍–‍40	31‍–‍50
Minnesota Twins	71	91	.438	21	43‍–‍38	28‍–‍53
Seattle Mariners	67	95	.414	25	41‍–‍41	26‍–‍54

=== Record vs. opponents ===
1986 American League record Sources:
Team	BAL	BOS	CAL	CWS	CLE	DET	KC	MIL	MIN	NYY	OAK	SEA	TEX	TOR
Baltimore	—	4–9	6–6	9–3	4–9	1–12	6–6	6–7	8–4	5–8	5–7	6–6	5–7	8–5
Boston	9–4	—	5–7	7–5	10–3	7–6	6–6	6–6	10–2	5–8	7–5	8–4	8–4	7–6
California	6–6	7–5	—	7–6	6–6	7–5	8–5	5–7	7–6	7–5	10–3	8–5	8–5	6–6
Chicago	3–9	5–7	6–7	—	5–7	6–6	7–6	5–7	6–7	6–6	7–6	8–5	2–11	6–6
Cleveland	9–4	3–10	6–6	7–5	—	4–9	8–4	8–5	6–6	5–8	10–2	9–3	6–6	3–10–1
Detroit	12–1	6–7	5–7	6–6	9–4	—	5–7	8–5	7–5	6–7	6–6	6–6	7–5	4–9
Kansas City	6–6	6–6	5–8	6–7	4–8	7–5	—	6–6	6–7	4–8	8–5	5–8	8–5	5–7
Milwaukee	7–6	6–6	7–5	7–5	5–8	5–8	6–6	—	4–8	8–5	5–7	6–6	4–8	7–6
Minnesota	4–8	2–10	6–7	7–6	6–6	5–7	7–6	8–4	—	4–8	6–7	6–7	6–7	4–8
New York	8–5	8–5	5–7	6–6	8–5	7–6	8–4	5–8	8–4	—	5–7	8–4	7–5	7–6
Oakland	7–5	5–7	3–10	6–7	2–10	6–6	5–8	7–5	7–6	7–5	—	10–3	3–10	8–4
Seattle	6–6	4–8	5–8	5–8	3–9	6–6	8–5	6–6	7–6	4–8	3–10	—	4–9	6–6
Texas	7–5	4–8	5–8	11–2	6–6	5–7	5–8	8–4	7–6	5–7	10–3	9–4	—	5–7
Toronto	5–8	6–7	6–6	6–6	10–3–1	9–4	7–5	6–7	8–4	6–7	4–8	6–6	7–5	—

=== Notable transactions ===
- April 4, 1986: Jerry Willard was signed as a free agent by the Athletics.
- May 20, 1986: Keith Atherton was traded by the Oakland Athletics to the Minnesota Twins for a player to be named later and cash. The Minnesota Twins sent Eric Broersma (minors) (May 23, 1986) to the Oakland Athletics to complete the trade.
- May 23, 1986: Dave Stewart was signed as a free agent with the Oakland Athletics.
- June 1, 1986: Dave Von Ohlen was purchased by the Athletics from the Miami Marlins.
- July 10, 1986: Mike Bordick was signed by the Athletics as an amateur free agent.
- July 10, 1986: Ozzie Canseco was signed as a free agent by the Oakland Athletics.
- July 18, 1986: Rick Langford was released by the Athletics.

==== Draft picks ====
- June 2, 1986: Bret Barberie was drafted by the Athletics in the 1st round (22nd pick) of the 1986 Major League Baseball draft (secondary phase), but did not sign.

=== Roster ===
1986 Oakland Athletics
Roster
Pitchers: 58 Darrel Akerfelds; 47 Joaquín Andújar; 54 Fernando Arroyo; 55 Keith Atherton; 40 Doug Bair; 48 Tim Birtsas; 23 Chris Codiroli; 59 Tom Dozier; 30 Moose Haas; 30 Jay Howell; 32 Bill Krueger; 22 Rick Langford; 52 Dave Leiper; 35 Bill Mooneyham; 53 Steve Ontiveros; 51 Eric Plunk; 38 José Rijo; 27 Rick Rodriguez; 34 Dave Stewart; 57 Dave Von Ohlen; 29 Curt Young	Catchers: 8 Bill Bathe; 36 Terry Steinbach; 6 Mickey Tettleton; 7,54 Jerry Willard; Infielders: 14 Bruce Bochte; 9 Mike Gallego; 3 Alfredo Griffin; 11 Wayne Gross; 15 Donnie Hill; 26 Dave Kingman; 4 Carney Lansford; 25 Mark McGwire; 49 Rob Nelson; 18,2 Tony Phillips; 17 Lenn Sakata	Outfielders: 12 Dusty Baker; 33 Jose Canseco; 16 Mike Davis; 5 Steve Henderson; 28 Stan Javier; 21 Dwayne Murphy; 31 Rick Peters; 24 Rusty Tillman	Manager: 10 Tony La Russa; 42 Jackie Moore; ? Jeff Newman; Coaches: 45 Bob Didier (Bench); 18 Dave Duncan (Pitching); 39 Dave McKay (First Base); 46,? Jeff Newman (Bullpen); 43 Ron Plaza (Hitting); 46 Joe Rudi (Hitting); 44 Wes Stock (Pitching); 55 Bob Watson (Hitting)

== Player stats ==
=== Batting ===
==== Starters by position ====
Note: Pos = Position; G = Games played; AB = At bats; H = Hits; Avg. = Batting average; HR = Home runs; RBI = Runs batted in

Pos	Player	G	AB	H	Avg.	HR	RBI
C	Mickey Tettleton	90	211	43	.204	10	35
1B	Bruce Bochte	125	407	104	.256	6	43
2B	Tony Phillips	118	441	113	.256	5	52
3B	Carney Lansford	151	591	168	.284	19	72
SS	Alfredo Griffin	162	594	169	.285	4	51
LF	José Canseco	157	600	144	.240	33	117
CF	Dwayne Murphy	98	329	83	.252	9	39
RF	Mike Davis	142	489	131	.268	19	55
DH	Dave Kingman	144	561	118	.210	35	94

==== Other batters ====
Note: G = Games played; AB = At bats; H = Hits; Avg. = Batting average; HR = Home runs; RBI = Runs batted in

Player	G	AB	H	Avg.	HR	RBI
Donnie Hill	108	339	96	.283	4	29
Dusty Baker	83	242	58	.240	4	19
Jerry Willard	75	161	43	.267	4	26
Stan Javier	59	114	23	.202	0	8
Bill Bathe	39	103	19	.184	5	11
Mark McGwire	18	53	10	.189	3	9
Rusty Tillman	22	39	10	.256	1	6
Ricky Peters	44	38	7	.184	0	1
Mike Gallego	20	37	10	.270	0	4
Lenn Sakata	17	34	12	.353	0	5
Steve Henderson	11	26	2	.077	0	3
Terry Steinbach	6	15	5	.333	2	4
Rob Nelson	5	9	2	.222	0	0
Wayne Gross	3	2	0	.000	0	0

=== Pitching ===
==== Starting pitchers ====
Note: G = Games pitched; IP = Innings pitched; W = Wins; L = Losses; ERA = Earned run average; SO = Strikeouts

Player	G	IP	W	L	ERA	SO
Curt Young	29	198.0	13	9	3.45	116
Joaquín Andújar	28	155.0	12	7	3.82	72
Chris Codiroli	16	91.2	5	8	4.03	43
Moose Haas	12	72.1	7	2	2.74	40
Rick Rodriguez	3	16.1	1	2	6.61	2

==== Other pitchers ====
Note: G = Games pitched; IP = Innings pitched; W = Wins; L = Losses; ERA = Earned run average; SO = Strikeouts

Player	G	IP	W	L	ERA	SO
José Rijo	39	193.2	9	11	4.65	176
Dave Stewart	29	149.1	9	5	3.74	102
Eric Plunk	26	120.1	4	7	2.74	98
Bill Mooneyham	45	99.2	4	5	4.52	75
Rick Langford	16	55.0	1	10	7.36	30
Bill Krueger	11	34.1	1	2	6.03	10

==== Relief pitchers ====
Note: G = Games pitched; W = Wins; L = Losses; SV = Saves; ERA = Earned run average; SO = Strikeouts

Player	G	W	L	SV	ERA	SO
Jay Howell	38	3	6	16	3.38	42
Steve Ontiveros	46	2	2	10	4.71	54
Dave Leiper	33	2	2	1	4.83	15
Doug Bair	31	2	3	4	3.00	40
Dave Von Ohlen	24	0	3	1	3.52	4
Keith Atherton	13	1	2	0	5.87	8
Tom Dozier	4	0	0	0	5.68	4
Darrel Akerfelds	2	0	0	0	6.75	5
Tim Birtsas	2	0	0	0	22.50	1
Fernando Arroyo	1	0	0	0	----	0

== Awards and honors ==
- José Canseco, American League Rookie of the Year
- Dave Kingman, American League Record, Most Home Runs in the Final Season of a Career (35)

== Farm system ==
Level	Team	League	Manager
AAA	Tacoma Tigers	Pacific Coast League	Keith Lieppman
AA	Huntsville Stars	Southern League	Brad Fischer
A	Modesto A's	California League	Tommie Reynolds
A	Madison Muskies	Midwest League	Jim Nettles
A-Short Season	Medford A's	Northwest League	Dave Hudgens
