= Joey Cora =

Puerto Rican baseball player and coach (born 1965)

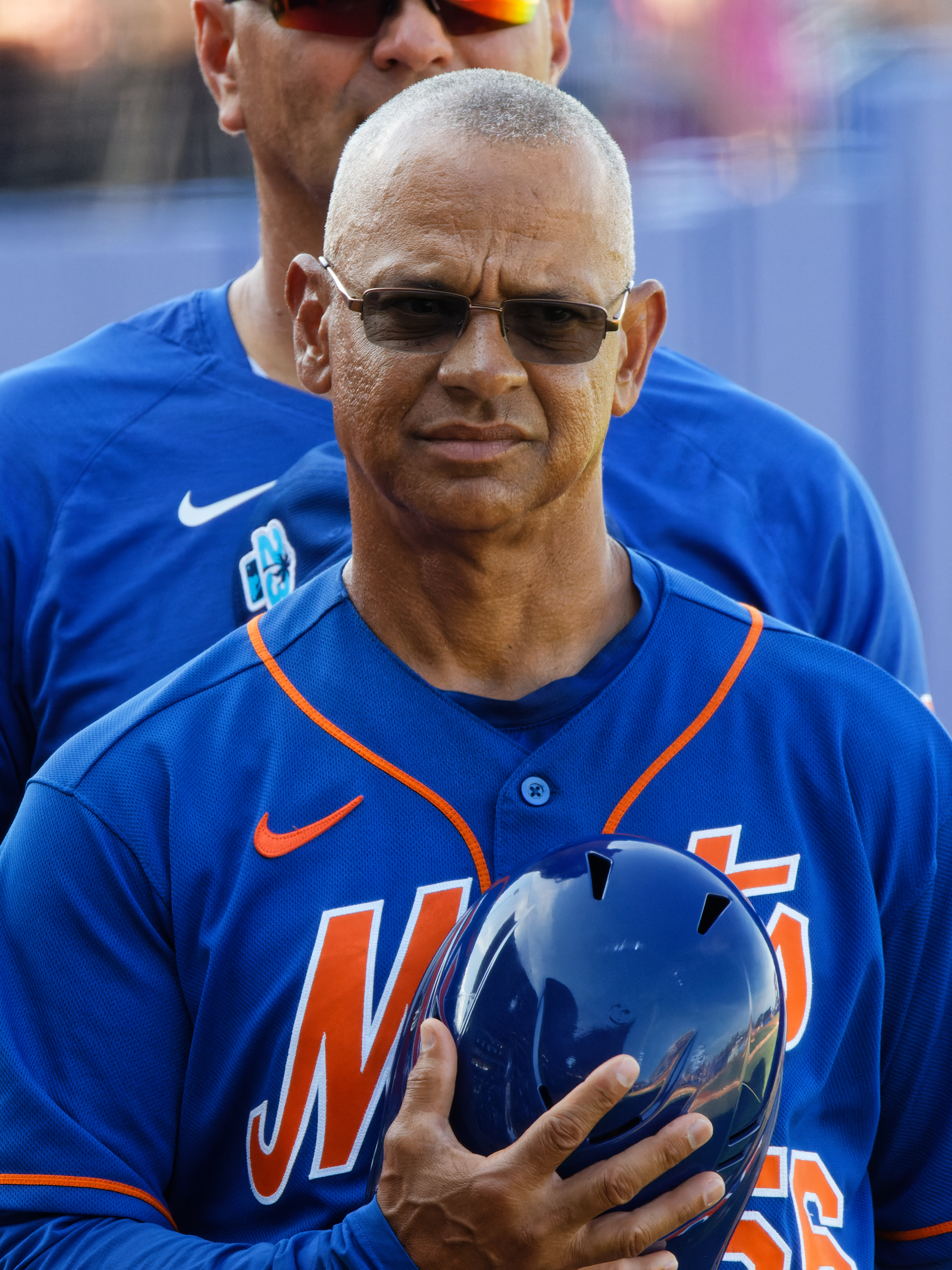
- Cora with the Mets in 2023
- Second baseman
- Born: May 14, 1965 (age 61); Caguas, Puerto Rico
- Batted: Switch Threw: Right

MLB debut
- April 6, 1987, for the San Diego Padres

Last MLB appearance
- September 27, 1998, for the Cleveland Indians

MLB statistics
- Batting average: .277
- Home runs: 30
- Runs batted in: 294
- Stats at Baseball Reference

Teams
- As player: San Diego Padres (1987, 1989–1990); Chicago White Sox (1991–1994); Seattle Mariners (1995–1998); Cleveland Indians (1998); As coach: Chicago White Sox (2004–2011); Miami Marlins (2012); Pittsburgh Pirates (2017–2021); New York Mets (2022–2023); Detroit Tigers (2024–2026)

Career highlights and awards
- All-Star (1997); World Series champion (2005)

José Manuel Cora Amaro (born May 14, 1965) is a Puerto Rican former professional baseball player who played for 11 seasons in Major League Baseball (MLB). He played for the San Diego Padres of the National League and the Chicago White Sox, Seattle Mariners, and Cleveland Indians of the American League. He primarily played as a second baseman. He later joined the coaching ranks in 2004.

== Career ==
=== Playing career ===
Cora attended Vanderbilt University and played college baseball for the Commodores. In 1984, he played collegiate summer baseball for the Chatham A's of the Cape Cod Baseball League (CCBL). He hit .373 with 28 stolen bases, and was named the league's most valuable player. In 2017, he was inducted into the CCBL Hall of Fame. He played with the Puerto Rico national baseball team at the 1984 Amateur World Series; Puerto Rico finished in 8th place, but Cora performed well, going 4-4 in the game against eventual champions Cuba.

The San Diego Padres selected Cora in the first round (23rd overall) of the 1985 MLB draft. As a member of the Beaumont Golden Gators, Cora was stabbed after a game in San Antonio, Texas, on June 22, 1986. Cora was waiting outside the team bus following the game against the San Antonio Missions at V.J. Keefe Stadium when two men called his name and then assaulted him. He was stabbed once in the stomach and once in the arm. Cora was quickly rushed to the hospital and later made a full recovery after spending six weeks on the disabled list. A man named Jose Puente, 29, was caught at the scene and was later charged with attempted murder. Cora had exchanged words with fans outside of the visitor's dressing room, resulting in the fans returning with more men later on.

Cora debuted in the major leagues on April 6, 1987 as a 21-year-old rookie. In his first career game, he started at second base and finished the game 2-for-5 in a 4–3 loss to the San Francisco Giants. After spending parts of three seasons with the Padres, Cora was traded to the Chicago White Sox along with Kevin Garner and Warren Newson in exchange for pitchers Adam Peterson and Steve Rosenberg on March 31, 1991. Cora spent the next four seasons with the White Sox before becoming a free agent.

On April 6, 1995, Cora signed with the Seattle Mariners. His 24-game hitting streak was a Mariners record (later broken by Ichiro Suzuki) and was an AL record for switch hitters (until broken by Kansas City's Jose Offerman in 1997). In 1997, he was elected to the AL All-Star team and went on to hit .300 with 11 home runs and 54 RBI in 149 games.

In the bottom of 11th inning of the deciding Game 5 of the 1995 American League Division Series, Cora bunted and dove into first base, narrowly avoiding the tag, kicking off the game-winning rally in which he scored on Edgar Martínez's walk-off double.

Cora spent most of the 1998 season as a Mariner, but with the team falling out of contention, he was dealt to the Cleveland Indians in exchange for David Bell on August 31. He finished the season batting a combined .276 with six home runs and 32 RBI in 155 games. Cora signed a free-agent contract with the Toronto Blue Jays during the off-season, but announced his retirement on March 11, 1999.

=== Coaching career ===
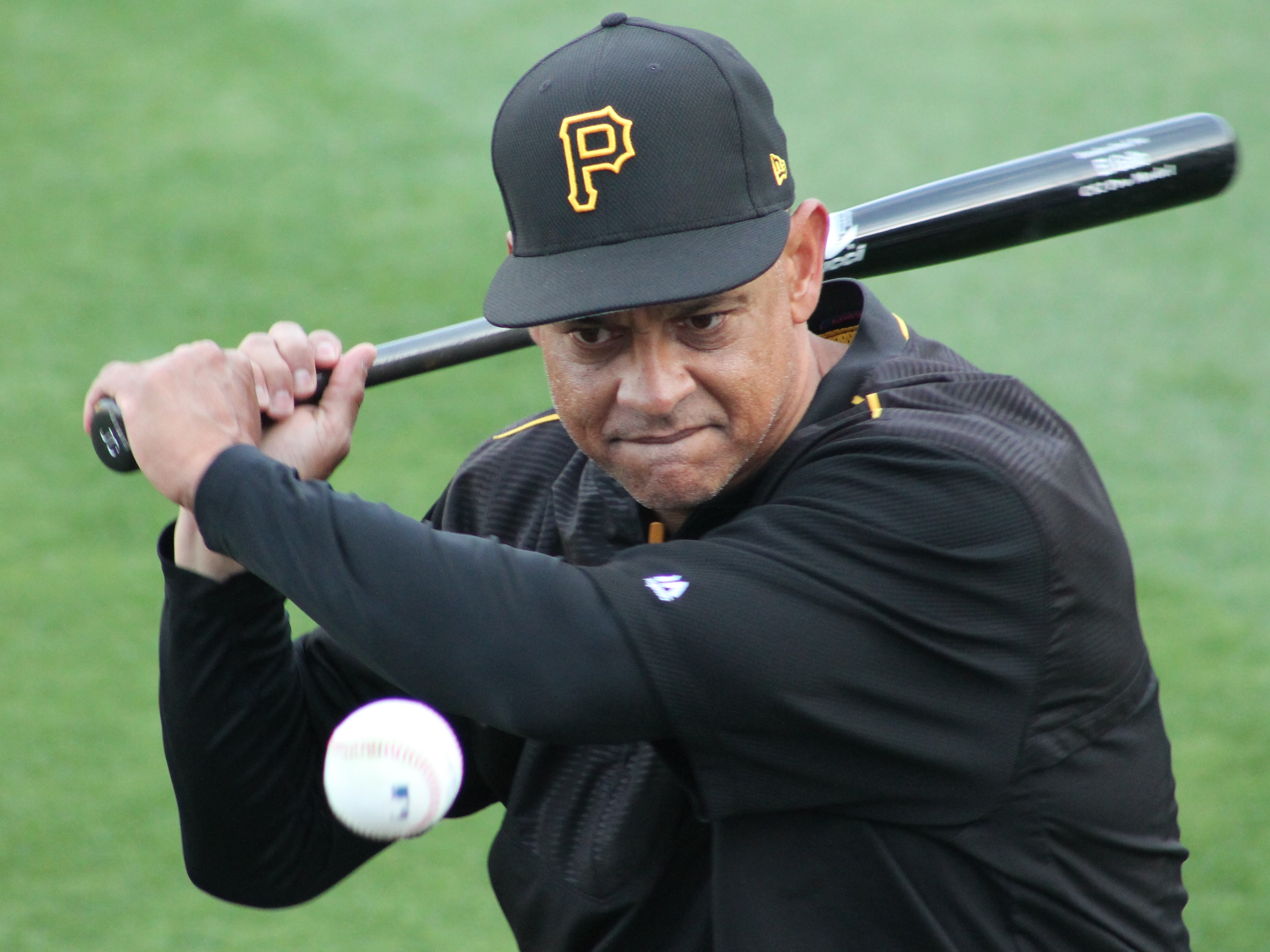
Cora with the Pirates in 2017

Following his retirement from play, Cora was hired in 2000 with the Chicago Cubs minor league team, the Daytona Cubs. He was later hired by teammate and good friend, Ozzie Guillén as a coach in 2003 for the Chicago White Sox. His responsibilities included facilitating the role of third base coach and organizing the team's spring training camps prior to his promotion to bench coach following the 2006 season. He occasionally served as an interim manager whenever Guillen was suspended or ejected from a game, or was unable to attend for any other reason.

He managed the Venezuelan Winter League baseball team Tiburones de la Guaira in the 2005–2006 season with a record of 31–31.

Cora was interviewed by the Milwaukee Brewers for their managerial opening in October 2010. He was believed to be a finalist along with Bob Melvin, Bobby Valentine, and Ron Roenicke.

Cora was dismissed by the White Sox on September 27, 2011, the day after they released Guillén from his contract, despite initially tabbing Cora to manage the final two games of the season. Cora was named bench coach of the Miami Marlins on November 1, 2011, reuniting with Guillén. Cora took over as interim manager for the Marlins on April 10, 2012 in the wake of Guillén's five-game suspension for comments related to Fidel Castro.

In December 2015, Cora was hired as manager of the Pittsburgh Pirates Double-A club, the Altoona Curve. He became the ninth manager in franchise history. He was promoted to third base coach for the major league team for the 2017 season. Cora was dismissed from his role following the 2021 season on October 9, 2021.

On January 5, 2022, Cora was hired by the New York Mets to serve as the team's third base coach for the 2022 season. Cora stayed on as the third base coach for the Mets for the 2023 season.

On December 5, 2023, Cora was hired by the Detroit Tigers to serve as the team's third base coach. He was relieved of those duties on July 7, 2026.

=== Broadcasting career ===
Cora served as a guest analyst on MLB Network's 2013 World Baseball Classic coverage and subsequently joined the network as an analyst. He debuted on MLB Tonight on May 6, 2013.

== Personal life ==
Cora is the elder brother of former MLB player and former Boston Red Sox manager Alex Cora. Both brothers have been part of at least one World Series-winning team. Joey was a third base coach for the 2005 World Champion Chicago White Sox. Alex was a shortstop and second baseman for the 2007 World Champion Boston Red Sox, a coach for the 2017 World Champion Houston Astros, and the manager of the 2018 World Champion Boston Red Sox.

Cora is a 2023 inductee of the Vanderbilt University Sports Hall of Fame.

== See also ==
- List of Major League Baseball players from Puerto Rico

Sporting positions
Preceded by Bruce Kimm	Chicago White Sox third base coach 2004–2006	Succeeded by Razor Shines
Preceded by Tim Raines	Chicago White Sox bench coach 2007–2011	Succeeded by Mark Parent
Preceded by Brandon Hyde	Miami Marlins bench coach 2012	Succeeded by Rob Leary
Preceded by Tom Prince	Altoona Curve manager 2016	Succeeded by Michael Ryan
