= Steve Rosenberg (baseball) =

American baseball player (born 1964)

- Pitcher
- Born: October 31, 1964 (age 60); Brooklyn, New York, U.S.
- Batted: Left Threw: Left

MLB debut
- June 4, 1988, for the Chicago White Sox

Last MLB appearance
- May 26, 1991, for the San Diego Padres

MLB statistics
- Win–loss record: 6–15
- Earned run average: 4.94
- Strikeouts: 115
- Stats at Baseball Reference

Teams
- Chicago White Sox (1988–1990); San Diego Padres (1991)

Steven Allen Rosenberg (born October 31, 1964) is an American former Major League Baseball left-handed pitcher who played for the Chicago White Sox and San Diego Padres from 1988 to 1991.

== Early years ==
Rosenberg was born and raised in Brooklyn, New York, and grew up in Coral Springs, Florida. He played football, basketball and baseball at Coral Springs High School, and played baseball at Broward Community College for two years before transferring to the University of Florida as a junior. After the 1985 season, he played collegiate summer baseball with the Falmouth Commodores of the Cape Cod Baseball League and was named a league all-star. As a senior, he tied a team record by pitching ten complete games in the postseason. After which, he was drafted by his hometown New York Yankees in the fourth round of the 1986 Major League Baseball draft.

He went 14-6 with a 2.84 earned run average in two seasons in the Yankees' farm system when he was packaged with Dan Pasqua and Mark Salas, and sent to the Chicago White Sox for pitchers Richard Dotson & Scott Nielsen on November 12, 1987.

== Chicago White Sox ==
He was 2-0 with three saves & a 3.33 ERA for the Pacific Coast League's Vancouver Canadians in 1988 when he got the call to the majors. He made his major league debut on June 4, and was hit hard by the Texas Rangers. In two innings, he gave up three runs on four hits and a walk. He earned the only save of his career on August 17 against the Toronto Blue Jays, and lost his only decision of the season in extra innings to the Minnesota Twins on September 10.

He earned his first major league win on May 14, 1989, against the Baltimore Orioles. He lost to Baltimore eight days later in his first major league start. He remained in the rotation for the rest of the season, earning his first win as a starting pitcher on June 12 against the Cleveland Indians. He beat his former franchise on July 17 to improve to 3-5 with a 4.48 ERA, however, Rosenberg had a rough second half to his season. Over the rest of the season, he was 1-8 with a 5.66 ERA. Opposing batters hit .296 against him.

Rosenberg was back in Vancouver in 1990, going 6-5 with a 4.38 ERA, mostly in relief. He was called up to the Chisox that September, and went 1-0 with a 5.40 ERA.

== San Diego Padres ==
During Spring training 1991, Rosenberg and Adam Peterson were traded to the San Diego Padres for Joey Cora, Warren Newson and minor leaguer Kevin Garner. He started the season in triple A with the Las Vegas Stars, but was up in the majors by early May when pitcher Pat Clements was placed on the fifteen day disabled list. He went 1-1 with a 6.94 ERA before being demoted back down to Las Vegas.

After the season, he was dealt to the New York Mets for infielder Jeff Gardner. but arm issues kept him off the field for all of the 1992 season. He never appeared in a game for the Mets at any level. In 1993, he appeared in six games with the Seattle Mariners' California League affiliate, the Riverside Pilots, before retiring.

== Personal life ==
Rosenberg is Jewish. He and his wife, Cristine, have four children: Dante, Chelsea, Nicole & Keri. Dante spent two seasons as a catcher in the St. Louis Cardinals organization.

== See also ==
- Florida Gators
- List of Florida Gators baseball players
- List of Jews in sports
