= Mark Salas =

American baseball player (born 1961)

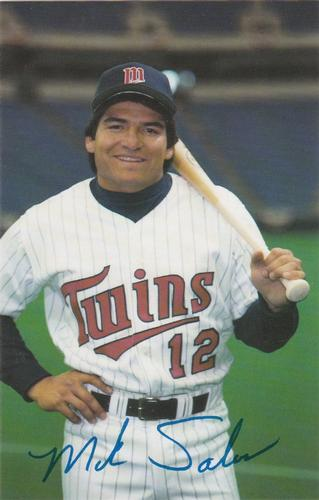
- Salas in 1987
- Catcher
- Born: March 8, 1961 (age 65); Montebello, California, U.S.
- Batted: Left Threw: Right

MLB debut
- June 19, 1984, for the St. Louis Cardinals

Last MLB appearance
- October 5, 1991, for the Detroit Tigers

MLB statistics
- Batting average: .247
- Home runs: 38
- Runs batted in: 143
- Stats at Baseball Reference

Teams
- St. Louis Cardinals (1984); Minnesota Twins (1985–1987); New York Yankees (1987); Chicago White Sox (1988); Cleveland Indians (1989); Detroit Tigers (1990–1991)

Mark Bruce Salas (born March 8, 1961) is an American former professional baseball catcher who played in Major League Baseball from 1984-1991. Salas, who is of Mexican descent, also worked for the Chicago White Sox as a bullpen catcher.

== St. Louis Cardinals ==
Salas was drafted out of Nogales High School in La Puente, California, by the St. Louis Cardinals in the eighteenth round of the 1979 Major League Baseball draft. After five seasons in their farm system, Salas debuted with the Cards on June 19, 1984 against the Montreal Expos. With one out in the ninth, Salas connected for a pinch hit double. He collected his first career run batted in in his next game against the Chicago Cubs. From there, Salas fell into an 0 for 17 slump, and was demoted to the triple A Louisville Redbirds. After the season, he was selected by the Minnesota Twins in the rule 5 draft.

== Minnesota Twins ==
Upon his arrival in Minnesota, Salas displaced All-Star catcher Dave Engle behind the plate (Engle was used primarily as a designated hitter in 1985). He hit his first major league home run off Hall of Famer Don Sutton on April 27, 1985, on his way to nine on the season. He also batted an even .300 with 41 RBIs and five triples in what would turn out to be his best season.

His 1986 season was interrupted in late May by a toe injury. He returned strong, batting .303 through July 1, but fell off after that. His batting average for the season was .233, however, he still produced 33 RBIs with eight home runs and four triples. Salas began the 1987 season splitting time with Tim Laudner behind the plate. He batted .378 with three home runs through June 6 when he was traded to the New York Yankees for starting pitcher Joe Niekro.

== New York Yankees and Chicago White Sox ==
Salas never quite got his footing as a Yankee, and batted .200 with three home runs and twelve RBIs over the remainder of the season in pinstripes. After which, Salas, pitcher Steve Rosenberg & outfielder Dan Pasqua were dealt to the Chicago White Sox for pitchers Richard Dotson & Scott Nielsen at the Winter meetings.

With Carlton Fisk turning 40 to start the season, the 1988 Chisox went with three catchers. Salas had the second most playing time, and batted .250 with three home runs and nine RBIs.

== Cleveland Indians ==
He was released during Spring training the following season, and signed with the Cleveland Indians. Salas was third on the Indians' depth chart at catcher, behind Andy Allanson & Joel Skinner. He spent most of the 1989 season with the triple A Colorado Springs Sky Sox, where he batted .315 with six home runs & twenty RBIs. He joined Cleveland in mid-May, and was used mostly as a designated hitter in his month and a half in the majors.

== Detroit Tigers ==
Salas signed with the Detroit Tigers the day before the 1990 season started. His first hit as a Tigers was a game-winning home run on April 15 against the Baltimore Orioles. Regardless, he saw limited duty until a mid-June injury to starting catcher Mike Heath landed him in the everyday line-up. His game-winning home run on June 10 led to a 7 for 17 stretch in which he hit two more home runs, and raised his batting average from .094 to .204. His nine home runs for the season tied a career high, and were two more than Heath.

Salas hit just one home run in 1991, but his final career home run likely stands as his biggest. As a team, the Tigers had struck out a franchise record tying 21 times in a fourteen inning marathon against the Toronto Blue Jays on August 8. Entering the game in the fourteenth inning as a pinch hitter for Skeeter Barnes, Salas connected on a 3-2 pitch for a three-run home run off Jays closer Tom Henke.

== Career statistics ==
Games	PA	AB	Runs	Hits	2B	3B	HR	RBI	SB	BB	SO	HBP	Avg.	Slg.	Fld%	CS%
509	1410	1292	142	319	49	10	38	143	3	89	163	12	.247	.389	.988	33%

Despite hitting just 38 home runs in his MLB career, Salas had three multi-home run games. The first one carried the Twins to a 6–2 victory over Charlie Hough and the Texas Rangers on September 11, 1986. The other two both came in blowout losses.
