= Warren Newson =

American baseball player (born 1964)

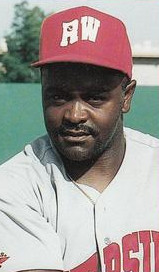
- Newson with the Riverside Red Wave in 1988
- Outfielder
- Born: July 3, 1964 (age 61); Newnan, Georgia, U.S.
- Batted: Left Threw: Left

Professional debut
- MLB: May 29, 1991, for the Chicago White Sox
- KBO: April 5, 2002, for the Kia Tigers

Last appearance
- MLB: September 27, 1998, for the Texas Rangers
- KBO: May 22, 2002, for the Kia Tigers

MLB statistics
- Batting average: .250
- Home runs: 34
- Runs batted in: 120

KBO statistics
- Batting average: .209
- Home runs: 7
- Runs batted in: 17
- Stats at Baseball Reference

Teams
- Chicago White Sox (1991–1995); Seattle Mariners (1995); Texas Rangers (1996–1998); Kia Tigers (2002)

Warren Dale Newson (born July 3, 1964) is an American former professional baseball outfielder. He played all or part of eight seasons in Major League Baseball (MLB) from 1991-98. He played for the Chicago White Sox (1991–1995), Seattle Mariners (1995) and Texas Rangers (1996–1998). He also played for the Kia Tigers of the KBO League in 2002.

The San Diego Padres drafted Newson out of Middle Georgia College in January 1986. The Padres traded him, Joey Cora, and Kevin Garner before the start of the 1991 season for pitchers Steve Rosenberg and Adam Peterson. He debuted in late May, working regularly as a pinch hitter in his rookie season.

Newson was given the nickname "The Deacon" by White Sox play-by-play announcer Ken Harrelson. Newson possessed exceptional strike zone judgment, prompting Bill James to herald him as a freely-available player who could help many teams win.

On July 18, 1995, the White Sox traded Newson to the Mariners for a player to be named later, with Jeff Darwin going to Chicago after the season. Newson hit .292 down the stretch for Seattle and batted 0-for-1 in the postseason. After the season, he signed with the Rangers.

In 2000, Newson was the Mexican League batting champion, hitting .386 with 39 home runs for Algodoneros de Unión Laguna.
