= Joel McKeon =

American baseball player (born 1963)

- Pitcher
- Born: February 25, 1963 (age 63); Covington, Kentucky, U.S.
- Batted: Left Threw: Left

MLB debut
- May 6, 1986, for the Chicago White Sox

Last MLB appearance
- July 10, 1987, for the Chicago White Sox

MLB statistics
- Win–loss record: 4–3
- Earned run average: 5.17
- Strikeouts: 32
- Stats at Baseball Reference

Teams
- Chicago White Sox (1986–1987)

Joel Jacob McKeon (born February 25, 1963) is an American former Major League Baseball pitcher who played for two seasons. He played for the Chicago White Sox for 30 games during the 1986 Chicago White Sox season and 13 games during the 1987 Chicago White Sox season.

McKeon grew up in Erlanger, Kentucky but moved to Florida before high school. McKeon attended South Broward High School in Hollywood, Florida and played college baseball at Miami Dade College. In 1987, South Broward dedicated its baseball clubhouse to McKeon.

He was drafted by the Chicago White Sox in 1982 and assigned to the Gulf Coast League to begin his professional career.

McKeon's wrist was injured early in spring training in 1986 but he performed well enough in the first month of the Triple-A season to earn his first promotion to the Major Leagues on May 7, 1986. Outfielder Rodney Craig was promoted to make room for him on the roster. He made his Major League debut on May 6 against the New York Yankees; he pitched a scoreless two thirds of an inning in relief of Dave Schmidt. He recorded the only save of his career on June 6 of that season, retiring both Oakland Athletics batters he faced in the bottom of the ninth inning. In July, McKeon contracted hepatitis in Cleveland and was hospitalized in Chicago. He was placed on the disabled list and would not return that season.

In 1987, McKeon was demoted to the minor leagues on June 4 after eleven appearances with the White Sox. On June 30, pitcher Ray Searage was demoted and McKeon was recalled to the Major League roster. He was demoted again on July 16. All said, he pitched 21 innings in with the White Sox in 1987 and allowed 22 earned runs. It would be his final season at the Major League level.

On February 11, 1988, McKeon was selected as the player to be named later in a trade to the San Diego Padres for Ed Wojna. McKeon was not added to the 40-man roster but was invited to spring training. McKeon would spend the next four seasons in the farm systems of the Padres, Montreal Expos, Atlanta Braves and Baltimore Orioles. His final season in affiliated Minor League Baseball came in 1991.

After his final season in North America, McKeon signed a contract to play baseball in Italy in 1992. However, after his contract fell through, he began pitching and managing for a team in Brasschaat, Belgium instead. He continued to play for the team at least through the 1995 season, also balancing it with a job in his father's automotive services supply company in Hollywood, Florida. In 1995, he coached the Belgian representative at the European Cup.

While playing in Belgium, McKeon met a woman named Karen, whom he would marry.
