= Dan Pasqua =

American baseball player (born 1961)

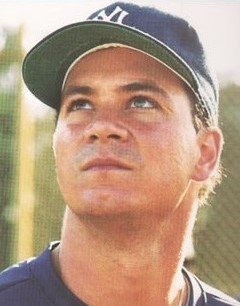
- Outfielder / First baseman
- Born: October 17, 1961 (age 64); Yonkers, New York, U.S.
- Batted: Left Threw: Left

MLB debut
- May 30, 1985, for the New York Yankees

Last MLB appearance
- May 1, 1994, for the Chicago White Sox

MLB statistics
- Batting average: .244
- Home runs: 117
- Runs batted in: 390
- Stats at Baseball Reference

Teams
- New York Yankees (1985–1987); Chicago White Sox (1988–1994)

Daniel Anthony Pasqua (born October 17, 1961) is an American professional baseball outfielder and first baseman who played in Major League Baseball for the New York Yankees and Chicago White Sox from 1985 through 1994. He works as a community representative for the White Sox.

== Early life ==
Pasqua is a native of Harrington Park, New Jersey. He attended Northern Valley Regional High School at Old Tappan, then William Paterson University in Wayne, New Jersey. He was an All-American outfielder for William Paterson in 1981 and 1982, and New Jersey Athletic Conference Player of the Year in 1982. He was drafted by the New York Yankees in the third round of the 1982 Major League Baseball draft.

== New York Yankees ==
Through his first three years in the Yankees' farm system, Pasqua batted .267 with 70 home runs and 242 runs batted in. A hot start with the International League's Columbus Clippers his fourth season earned him a promotion up to the Bronx early in the 1985 season.

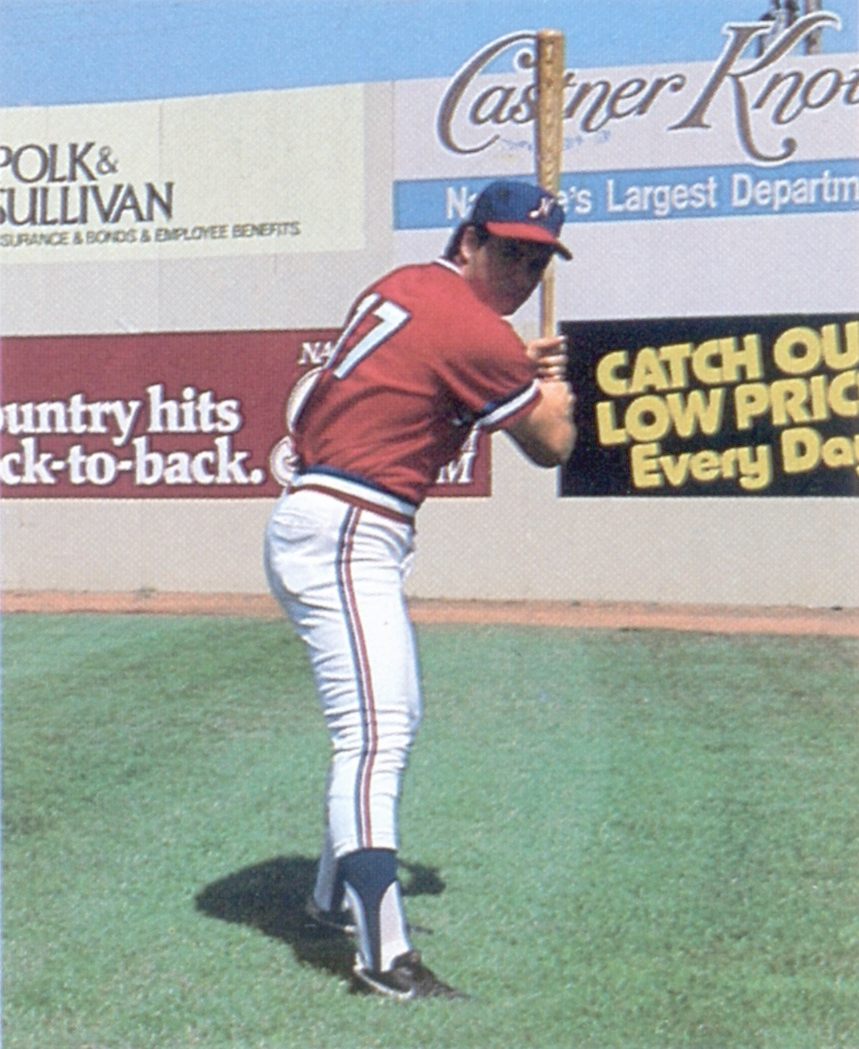
Pasqua with the Nashville Sounds in 1984

Pasqua made his major league debut on May 30 against the California Angels. After lining into a double play in his first major league at bat, he hit a home run in his second. This was followed by a 3-for-26 slump that got him sent back to Columbus for more seasoning. In his second game back with the Yankees, Pasqua had his first career two home run game. He was demoted back to Columbus again at the start of August, and returned in the middle of the month to bat .203 with five home runs and fifteen RBIs over the remainder of the season. All told, Pasqua batted .209 with nine home runs and 25 RBIs with the Yankees. In three stints in Columbus, he compiled a .321 batting average, eighteen home runs & 69 RBIs to earn IL Rookie of the Year and Most Valuable Player honors. During the off-season, the Montreal Expos were rebuked in their offer of Andre Dawson for Pasqua.

Although Yankees manager Lou Piniella (who was, himself, a left fielder during his playing days) named Pasqua his starting left fielder during spring training 1986, 1985 left fielder Ken Griffey, Sr. ended up winning the job when Pasqua batted .102 that spring. Pasqua began the season with Columbus, and batted .291 with six home runs and 20 RBI to get recalled by the Yankees on May 18. In his first start back in pinstripes, Pasqua went 2 for 3, with a home run, double and four RBI. The next day, he had his second career two home run game. With his batting average hovered around .300 through most of June, he made his first career appearance at first base on June 28 in order to get his bat in the line up more frequently. As rising All-Star Don Mattingly had a firm grip on the first base job, the Yankees shipped Griffey to the Atlanta Braves on June 30, in order to open a regular position for Pasqua in their line-up. With the left field job genuinely his now, Pasqua batted .296 with 12 home runs and 35 RBI over the remainder of the season.

While Pasqua clubbed six home runs through May 1987, he struggled to keep his batting average over .200. By the end of June, the left field job was Gary Ward's, and Pasqua was once again in Columbus. He returned to the Yankees in mid July, and batted .268 with nine home runs and 19 RBI over the rest of the season. At the winter meetings, Pasqua, pitcher Steve Rosenberg and catcher Mark Salas were dealt to the Chicago White Sox for pitchers Richard Dotson and Scott Nielsen.

== Chicago White Sox ==
In 1988, Pasqua hit a career-high 20 home runs. He also demonstrated versatility when he was shifted into right field following a season ending injury to right fielder Iván Calderón.

In 1989, it was Pasqua whose season was cut short by injuries. In the second game of the season, he suffered a right wrist injury that kept him out of the line-up until May 14. On August 4, he twisted his knee in the outfield. After which, he made two pinch hitting appearances and three starts at designated hitter before being shut down for the season. This knee injury limited Pasqua through the start of the 1990 season. When he did return, he mostly pinch hit or served as designated hitter.

In 1991, Pasqua made 83 appearances as a first baseman versus just 59 in both corner outfield positions. Regardless of where he played on the field, he hit, as 1991 was his best season with the bat. He had a career high 108 hits that produced a career high 71 runs and a career high 66 RBI. He also hit 18 home runs with a career high five triples.

Pasqua was set to hit free agency after the season. Just before his filing date, he was issued a summons by police when a package allegedly containing marijuana and an unused pipe was delivered to his Dumont, New Jersey home. He reached a settlement, in which he paid a $545 fine and submitted to random drug testing in exchange for having the two minor disorderly conduct charges dropped shortly after re-signing with the Chisox.

With Frank Thomas then at first, Pasqua shifted back to right field for 1992. He got off to an exceptional start, with his batting average climbing as high as .379 toward the end of April. However, he soon stopped hitting (.107 average, 0 home runs, three RBI in May). He went on the disabled list in June, with a strained right hamstring. He returned at the end of the month only to suffer an ankle injury that knocked him out of the line-up for two weeks in July. All told, he was limited to 93 games, in which he batted .211 with six home runs and 33 RBI. His .347 slugging percentage was a career low.

Pasqua found himself without a position in 1993; he made his way into 78 games between pinch hitting, and backing up first base, DH and the corner outfield positions. His 206 plate appearances were his least since his rookie season. Despite poor stats (.205 average, five home runs, 20 RBI), 1993 was a memorable year for Pasqua in that he made his only postseason in his career. He appeared in games one and two of the 1993 American League Championship Series against the Toronto Blue Jays and walked and scored in the fourth inning of game one. In game two, he committed a first inning error that led to an unearned run. The Sox tied it in the bottom of the inning, and left runners on second and third when Pasqua struck out to end the inning. After the Jays took a 3-1 lead, Pasqua hit a weak fly to center with the bases loaded and no outs in the fifth. The Sox were unable to score, and went on to lose the game, 3-1.

His performance invited criticism from teammate Bo Jackson. Jackson did not appear in either of the first two games, and commented afterward, "We've been playing for two days one man short," alluding to Pasqua. Pasqua did not appear in any of the four remaining games, and ended the series 0 for 6 with a walk and a run scored. Jackson was the DH in games three through five, and went 0 for 10 with three walks and six strikeouts.

Pasqua appeared in 11 games in 1994 before being shut down for the season by arthroscopic knee surgery and never returned to the majors.

== Personal life ==
In 1987, a former high school classmate of Pasqua was sentenced to six months in jail by a Rockland County, New York judge for impersonating Pasqua in order to swindle two women out of a combined $8,000.
