= Ken Harrelson =

American baseball player and broadcaster (born 1941)

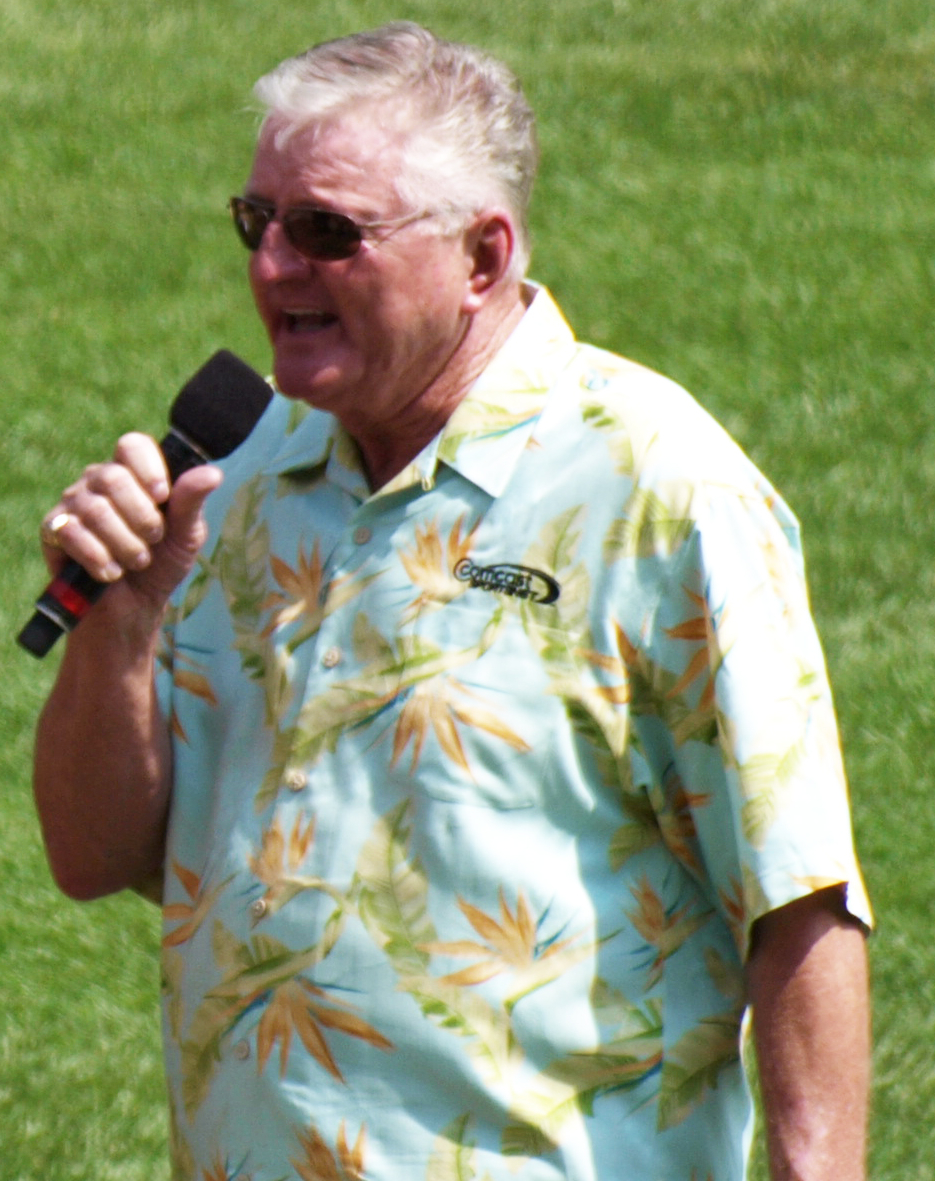
- Harrelson at U.S. Cellular Field in 2010
- First baseman / Right fielder
- Born: September 4, 1941 (age 85); Woodruff, South Carolina, U.S.
- Batted: Right Threw: Right

MLB debut
- June 9, 1963, for the Kansas City Athletics

Last MLB appearance
- June 20, 1971, for the Cleveland Indians

MLB statistics
- Batting average: .239
- Home runs: 131
- Runs batted in: 421
- Stats at Baseball Reference

Teams
- Kansas City Athletics (1963–1966); Washington Senators (1966–1967); Kansas City Athletics (1967); Boston Red Sox (1967–1969); Cleveland Indians (1969–1971)

Career highlights and awards
- All-Star (1968); AL RBI leader (1968)

Kenneth Smith Harrelson (born September 4, 1941), nicknamed "the Hawk" due to his distinctive profile, is an American former professional baseball player and television announcer. He played in Major League Baseball (MLB) from 1963 to 1971 as a first baseman and outfielder, and he subsequently spent 33 years as a play-by-play broadcast announcer for the Chicago White Sox. In December 2019, Harrelson was named the 2020 recipient of the Ford C. Frick Award, presented annually to one broadcaster for "major contributions to baseball".

== Early life ==
Harrelson was born in Woodruff, South Carolina, and his family moved to Savannah, Georgia, when he was in fifth grade. As a child Harrelson was interested in basketball and he hoped to pursue a basketball scholarship from the University of Kentucky. His parents divorced when he was eight.

He played golf, baseball, football and basketball at Benedictine Military School in Savannah, Georgia.

== Playing career ==
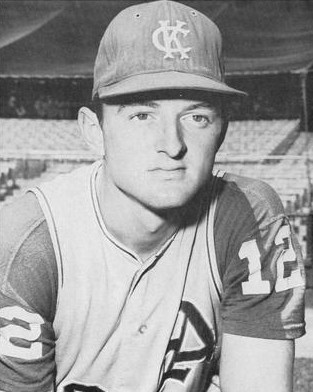
Harrelson as a member of the Kansas City Athletics in 1965.

Throwing and batting right-handed, Harrelson played for four teams: the Kansas City Athletics (1963–66, 1967), Washington Senators (1966–67), Boston Red Sox (1967–69), and Cleveland Indians (1969–71). In his nine-season career, Harrelson was a .239 hitter with 131 home runs and 421 RBI in 900 games.

His time with the Athletics in 1967 ended abruptly after only 61 games, when Harrelson was quoted in a Washington newspaper calling team owner Charlie Finley "a menace to baseball" following the dismissal of manager Alvin Dark. Although Harrelson denied using the word "menace", he was released and ended up signing a lucrative deal with the Boston Red Sox, who were in contention to win their first pennant since 1946.

Brought in to replace the injured Tony Conigliaro, Harrelson hit a home run on his first at bat for Boston and helped the team win the pennant, but watched the team drop the World Series to the St. Louis Cardinals in seven games. However, in 1968, he had his finest season, making the American League All-Star team, hitting a career-high 35 home runs, and leading the major leagues in runs batted in with 109. He also finished third in the American League Most Valuable Player balloting, with two players from the pennant-winning Detroit Tigers finishing ahead of him—pitcher Denny McLain won the award and catcher Bill Freehan finished second.

Harrelson announced his retirement the day after he was traded along with Dick Ellsworth and Juan Pizarro from the Red Sox to the Indians for Sonny Siebert, Vicente Romo and Joe Azcue on April 19, 1969. He had felt that his business ventures made it impractical for him to move to any other city. His agent Bob Woolf added, "If Ken left Boston, he'd be losing between half a million and three quarter of a million dollars." Following conversations with commissioner Bowie Kuhn and a contract adjustment by Cleveland, Harrelson ended his first retirement a few days later. He went 2-for-4, including a triple in the first plate appearance of his Indians debut, an 11–3 loss to the New York Yankees at Cleveland Stadium on April 24. He finished the year with 30 home runs and a career-high 99 walks. He also used his local celebrity status to briefly host a half-hour TV show, The Hawk's Nest, on local CBS affiliate WJW-TV. Harrelson was very popular in Cleveland, with his autobiography coming out around the time of the trade to the Indians.

During spring training the following year, Harrelson suffered a broken leg while sliding into second base during a March 19 exhibition game against the Oakland Athletics. The injury kept him on the sidelines for much of the season. When Indians rookie Chris Chambliss took over the first base position in 1971, Harrelson retired mid-season to pursue a professional golf career.

=== Batting glove usage ===
Harrelson is often credited with being the first Major League player to wear a batting glove when he did so in the 1960s, using a golf glove to protect a hand that had been blistered by playing 27 holes of golf.

However, in A Game of Inches, baseball historian Peter Morris writes that a batting glove may have been used as early as 1901 by Hughie Jennings, and was definitely used by Lefty O'Doul and Johnny Frederick of the Brooklyn Dodgers in 1932. In 1949, outfielder Marv Rickert brought the concept of wearing a golf glove while batting to the Boston Braves, and the practice spread to other major leaguers. In the 1940s and 1950s, many players wore batting gloves in Major League games, including Birdie Tebbetts, Roy Campanella, Bobby Ávila, and Johnny Temple.

Morris does, however, credit Harrelson and Rusty Staub with helping to popularize batting gloves, which were ubiquitous by the late 1970s.

== Broadcasting career ==
Harrelson began a broadcasting career in 1975 with the Boston Red Sox on WSBK-TV, partnering with Dick Stockton. He became highly popular, especially after being teamed with veteran play-by-play man Ned Martin in 1979. Harrelson left after the 1981 season, moving to a broadcasting role with the Chicago White Sox; Harrelson noted that he and Red Sox co-owner Haywood Sullivan "didn't get along". Harrelson served as a White Sox announcer from 1982 to 1985.

=== Executive role with White Sox ===
On October 2, 1985, Harrelson was named executive vice president of baseball operations for the White Sox. Then-general manager of the White Sox Roland Hemond was given a special assistant role, and left the team in April 1986, leaving Harrelson as the de facto general manager, until Tom Haller was hired as the team's new general manager in early June 1986. Haller would have disagreements with Harrelson and leave at the end of the season. During June 1986, Harrelson fired assistant general manager Dave Dombrowski (who became baseball's youngest general manager with the Montreal Expos two years later) and fired manager Tony La Russa (who was soon hired by the Oakland Athletics). Harrelson also traded rookie Bobby Bonilla, later a six-time All-Star, to the Pittsburgh Pirates for pitcher José DeLeón in July 1986. Harrelson resigned his executive role with the White Sox on September 26, 1986, approximately one week before the end of the regular season. The 1986 Chicago White Sox finished the season with a record of 72–90, 20 games behind the division-winning California Angels.

=== Return to broadcasting ===
During the 1987 and 1988 seasons, Harrelson was the play-by-play announcer for New York Yankees games on SportsChannel New York. From 1984 to 1989, he served as a backup color commentator on NBC's Game of the Week broadcasts alongside play-by-play man Jay Randolph. In 1994, Harrelson served as a broadcaster for the short-lived Baseball Network and was the US broadcaster for the Japan Series that aired through the Prime-SportsChannel regional networks.

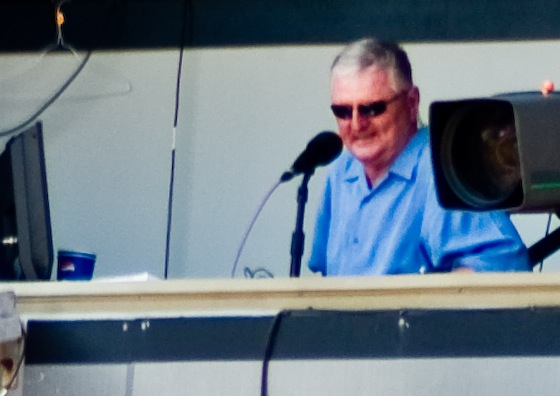
Harrelson in the broadcast booth in 2007

Harrelson returned to the White Sox in 1990 as the main play-by-play announcer during television broadcasts, teaming up with Tom Paciorek until 2000 and Darrin Jackson from 2000 to 2008. In 2009, former Chicago Cubs color analyst Steve Stone began accompanying Harrelson in the television booth. During this time he won five Emmy Awards and two Illinois Sportscaster of the Year awards. However, in 2010, GQ magazine named Harrelson the worst broadcaster in baseball.

Starting with the 2016 season, Harrelson cut back his schedule to road games and select home games. Jason Benetti took over as the television announcer for most home games. On May 31, 2017, Harrelson announced his final year in the broadcast booth would be the 2018 season. After calling his final game, a 6–1 loss to the crosstown rival Chicago Cubs, Harrelson officially retired from broadcasting on September 24, 2018.

On December 11, 2019, Harrelson was named the 2020 recipient of the Ford C. Frick Award, presented annually for excellence in broadcasting by the National Baseball Hall of Fame and Museum.

== Catch phrases, criticism and nicknames ==
Harrelson is known for his homerism (open expression of pro-home team bias) and catch phrases, also known as "Hawkisms". Popular "Hawkisms" include: "You can put it on the board! Yes! Yes! A bomb for (insert player here)" after a Sox home run, "He gone!" and/or "Grab some bench!" after a strikeout of an opposing player, and "Stretch!" when a White Sox player hits a ball toward the outfield fence. Hawk often states "Sacks packed with Sox" when the bases are loaded.

When a telecast begins, Hawk states, "Sit back. Relax and strap it down" to the viewers, right before commercial break before the first pitch. Harrelson refers to the White Sox as "the good guys" (based on the team's mid-1990s slogan Good Guys Wear Black). When a White Sox player hits a ball which appears to be heading foul, Harrelson often states "Stay fair!" Hawk will state "Dadgummit" when a ball that looks to be a home run is caught short of the wall or in general when a play does not go the White Sox's way. When a hitter hits a long foul ball that would have been a home run if it were fair, Hawk will say "right size, wrong shape." If a White Sox hitter makes good contact, but the ball is hit where a fielder can make the out, Hawk says, "That's a hang with-em." For a time, Hawk often stated "Hell yes!" after an advantageous event for the White Sox. While he insists that exclaiming "Hell yes!" is not contrived and is a product of his devotion to the White Sox, it has generated some controversy.

He is also known for shouting out "Mercy!" after a great defensive play is executed by a player or players and sometimes, when it is an exceptionally great play, or the play does not go the White Sox's way, he will also exclaim "You gotta be...bleeping me!" When a batter swings and misses he will proclaim, "Big hack, no contact." Harrelson refers to a routine flyball as a "can of corn." Hawk also calls bloop hits that land between fielders, "duck snorts." He refers to a two-hop infield ground ball as a "chopper-two-hopper." He calls a hard-hit ground ball that takes a favorable bounce for the fielder a "Bolingbrook Bounce." He refers to any play with a broken bat as a "Matt Abbatacola." Matt Abbatacola is a local sports radio show host and producer for AM 670 TheScore, which carries the White Sox radio broadcasts. The two met during spring training a few years ago, and Hawk decided to use his name during broken bat plays because of the distinctiveness and sound of his name. When a White Sox rally starts, Hawk Harrelson will often enthusiastically say, "Don't stop now boys." In July 2010, GQ named Harrelson the worst announcer in baseball. He has stated publicly that he wants to die in the booth during a game and that he will never retire.

Though Harrelson has been criticized for his repeated use of catch phrases and hometown allegiances, his popularity with White Sox fans is demonstrable. Harrelson was nominated for the 2007 Ford C. Frick award (won by Royals announcer Denny Matthews), and his presence in the field of nominees for that award was due to the support of fans, who placed him in nomination (along with Cincinnati Reds announcer Joe Nuxhall and San Francisco/Oakland announcer Bill King) via an online vote.

Hawk is also well known for his fierce on-air criticisms of umpires. Harrelson appears to have developed a dislike of umpire Joe West, who "in the past few years, has had some problems with the White Sox." West had started a game the night before, but called it due to rain after about a half inning of play. In a game in May 2010, West had ejected Ozzie Guillén and Mark Buehrle for two separate balks in the same game. Hawk said on a broadcast in 2015, "The first rule of baseball is catch the baseball and the second rule is don't mess with Joe West."

Following an on-air outburst about umpire Mark Wegner during a game on May 30, 2012, Harrelson received a reprimand from MLB commissioner Bud Selig. Harrelson's comments followed Wegner's ejection of White Sox rookie pitcher José Quintana after Quintana threw a pitch behind Ben Zobrist. After White Sox manager Robin Ventura's ejection for arguing the call, Harrelson commented: "I'll tell you what, they have got to start making guys be accountable. That is totally absurd. Here's an umpire in the American League that knows nothing about the game of baseball. They have got to do something about this. They have got some guys in this league that have no business umpiring. They have no business umpiring because they don't know what the game of baseball is about, and he is one of them." Although Harrelson said that such a tirade would not happen again, later in the same season, he lashed out at umpire Lance Barrett following the ejections of A. J. Pierzynski and Robin Ventura. Harrelson stated that "Lance Barrett has just stunk the joint up is all he's done. That's all he's done." He also claimed that "Everything that (Mariners pitcher) Blake Beavan has thrown up there that (catcher Miguel) Olivo has caught has been a strike. If he caught it, it was a strike. He's got two different strike zones. He's got a two-foot for Beavan, and he's got a 10-inch for the White Sox. What does that tell you?"

A year later he had another outburst umpire tirade, this time over an alleged blown call in the bottom of the tenth against the Miami Marlins, when Angel Hernandez called Alex Rios out at first base, turning what would have been a game-winning bases-loaded ground ball fielder's choice for the White Sox into an inning-ending double play. His reaction was, "And another blown call by Hernandez!"

Harrelson's emotive and particularly distinctive call of Mark Buehrle's perfect game on July 23, 2009, was also notable. As Buehrle exited the field after the eighth inning, he exclaimed, "Call your sons! Call your daughters! Call your friends! Call your neighbors! Mark Buehrle has a perfect game going into the ninth!" Also, as the final ground ball of the game rolled towards the White Sox shortstop Alexei Ramírez, Harrelson called out "Alexei?!" (Harrelson often refers to the White Sox players by their first names.) As Ramirez completed the throw to the first baseman Josh Fields, Harrelson shouted "Yes! Yes! Yes! Yes! Yes! History!"

Though some did not like Harrelson's lack of verbosity and obvious hometown boosterism at the concluding moment of the game, others felt the outburst of emotion captured exactly what they were feeling as the perfect game was sealed. A Chicago Tribune columnist, Phil Rosenthal, arguing that each perfect game call is "memorable in its own way", made an explicit comparison of Harrelson's call to Vin Scully's call of Sandy Koufax's perfect game.

Harrelson had a 30-minute special on CSN Chicago, Put it on The Board which aired on Monday, June 7, 2010, celebrating his 25 years as a Chicago White Sox broadcaster with memorable footage, memorable quotes and an interview with CSN Chicago's Chuck Garfien. Ken said during the interview, "I hope to be broadcasting for the White Sox until I die." He joked and said how he was going to die: in the White Sox broadcasting booth with his last words, "You can put it on the booooard... (dies without finishing)" Harrelson was honored with "Hawk Harrelson Night" by the Chicago White Sox for 25 years of broadcasting that was on Tuesday, June 8, 2010, vs. Detroit Tigers. The White Sox had a T-shirt giveaway for Harrelson for the first 10,000 fans that came to the game. The T-shirt has the White Sox logo on the front and in big letters on the back "Hawkism" with his famous catch phrases on the back. Harrelson also threw out the ceremonial first pitch before the game to White Sox manager Ozzie Guillén.

As a man long-known for creating nicknames, his own nickname "Hawk" originated during his early playing days. Teammates began calling him "Hawk" due to his curvy, pointy nose. Harrelson coined many nicknames for popular Sox players, including "Black Jack" McDowell, Carlos "El Caballo" Lee, Lance "One Dog" Johnson, Frank "The Big Hurt" Thomas, Craig "Little Hurt" Grebeck, "The Deacon" Warren Newson, "Big Bad" Bobby Jenks, "The Silent Assassin" Javier Vázquez, Herbert "the Milkman" Perry, Jake "The Jake-Meister" Peavy, Dayán "The Tank" Viciedo, Willie "Peapod" Harris, Paul "The Professor" Konerko and Magglio "Maggs" Ordóñez, along with fan favorite "Big Dick" Richard Dotson. During a broadcast, Harrelson attempted to nickname partner Darrin Jackson "The Squirrel" because of the quantity of peanuts his partner ate, to which Jackson replied, "No." He called his partner Steve Stone "Stone Pony." It is unclear if that nickname is a reference to the popular music venue or the Linda Ronstadt band, the Stone Poneys. Recently, he began calling White Sox slugger Adam Dunn "Biggin". "Biggin" is a Southern slang term for large people, which reflects Hawk's Deep South roots. Dunn is 6'6" and 285 pounds. More recently, Harrelson has been referring to José Abreu as El Cañon or "The Cannon." Although not a nickname, during the time when Greg Norton played for the Chicago White Sox between 1996 and 2000, Harrelson would add the line "Norton, You're The Greatest" after "You can put it on the board! Yes! Yes!" when Norton hit a home run. This was a mashup of two references from the sitcom The Honeymooners: one character was named Edward "Ed" Lillywhite Norton, and another character, Ralph Kramden, would say to his wife, Alice, "Baby, you're the greatest."

An informal study by one baseball columnist, based on the number of home-team "biased" comments throughout the course of a game, concluded that Harrelson was by a wide margin the broadcaster who openly rooted for his team the most often. He embraced the results, responding, "That's the biggest compliment you could give me, to call me the biggest homer in baseball."

== Personal life ==
While he was still in high school, Harrelson met his first wife, Elizabeth Ann "Betty" Pacifici, whom he would marry that year. The marriage produced four children (Patricia, Michael, Richard, and John), and three grandchildren (Nikole, Ryan and Kiefer) and one great-grandson, Jack. Harrelson filed for divorce from Betty on June 28, 1971.

In 1970, Harrelson was part-owner of a $2 million waterfront nightclub in East Boston called the 1800 Club. A three-quarter sized replica of Donald McKay's clipper ship Flying Cloud was docked next to the club and was used as a floating cocktail lounge. The location offered superb views of Boston Harbor and the downtown skyline. The complex was severely damaged by fire on January 20, 1971, and never re-opened.

Harrelson was also a talented golfer. After retiring from baseball, Harrelson competed in the 1972 British Open. He missed the cut by one stroke, shooting +11. In 1980, he made the cut at the Pleasant Valley Jimmy Fund Classic, a PGA Tour event.

On September 13, 1973, Harrelson married Aris Harritos. They have two children, daughter Krista and son Casey, as well as two grandchildren, Nico and Alexander. Harrelson's son Casey played in the White Sox minor league system in 1999. The family resides in Orlando, Florida.

Harrelson resided in Granger, Indiana during baseball seasons, and would often discuss the long commute from his home to Guaranteed Rate Field during broadcasts.

== Namesakes ==
- Hawk Drive, Tucson, Arizona

== See also ==
- List of Major League Baseball annual runs batted in leaders
