= Craig Grebeck =

American baseball player (born 1964)

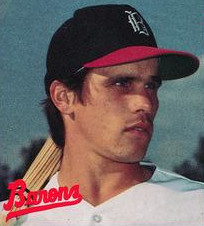
- Grebeck in 1988
- Infielder
- Born: December 29, 1964 (age 61); Johnstown, Pennsylvania, U.S.
- Batted: Right Threw: Right

MLB debut
- April 13, 1990, for the Chicago White Sox

Last MLB appearance
- June 2, 2001, for the Boston Red Sox

MLB statistics
- Batting average: .261
- Home runs: 19
- Runs batted in: 187
- Stats at Baseball Reference

Teams
- Chicago White Sox (1990–1995); Florida Marlins (1996); Anaheim Angels (1997); Toronto Blue Jays (1998–2000); Boston Red Sox (2001)

Craig Allen Grebeck (born December 29, 1964) is an American former professional baseball middle infielder. He played in Major League Baseball (MLB) for the Chicago White Sox, Florida Marlins, Anaheim Angels, Toronto Blue Jays, and Boston Red Sox.

== Biography ==
In 1989, Grebeck led the Southern League with 153 base hits.

Grebeck was mainly used as a backup in his career. Known for not wearing batting gloves, he hit .261, 19 home runs, 187 RBIs, and 518 hits in 752 major league games.

Grebeck hit his first major league home run off of Hall of Famer Nolan Ryan, who then proceeded to plunk Grebeck in his ribs the following week, breaking a rib.

As a member of the White Sox, the 5 ft 7 in (1.70 m), 148 lb Grebeck had his locker right in between two of the biggest men in MLB history, Frank Thomas and Bo Jackson.

He started the 2001 season with the Red Sox while Nomar Garciaparra was out with a wrist injury.

Grebeck was nicknamed 'The Little Hurt to our offense' by White Sox announcer Ken Harrelson.
