= Rusty Tillman (baseball) =

American baseball player

- Outfielder
- Born: August 29, 1960 (age 65); Jacksonville, Florida, U.S.
- Batted: Right Threw: Right

MLB debut
- June 6, 1982, for the New York Mets

Last MLB appearance
- June 18, 1988, for the San Francisco Giants

MLB statistics
- Batting average: .232
- Home runs: 2
- Runs batted in: 9
- Stats at Baseball Reference

Teams
- New York Mets (1982); Oakland Athletics (1986); San Francisco Giants (1988)

Kerry Jerome "Rusty" Tillman (born August 29, 1960) is an American former right-handed professional baseball player. He played in 1982 for the New York Mets, in 1986 for the Oakland Athletics and in 1988 for the San Francisco Giants).

== Career ==
Tillman was drafted by the Mets in the 10th round of the 1979 amateur draft out of Florida Community College at Jacksonville, and he began his professional career that year. He played for the Grays Harbor Loggers and Little Falls Mets, hitting a combined .297 with 23 stolen bases in 66 games. In 1980, he played for the Lynchburg Mets, hitting .316 with 11 triples and 43 stolen bases. With the Jackson Mets in 1981, he hit .278 with 29 stolen bases.

He began the 1982 season with the Tidewater Tides, hitting .322 with 26 stolen bases in 108 games. On June 6, he made his big league debut, appearing as a pinch-hitter for pitcher Craig Swan. He singled in his first big league at-bat. In 13 at-bats in 1982, he hit .154 with a double and a stolen base.

Back in the minors in 1983, Tillman played for the Tides, hitting .255 with 23 stolen bases in 126 games. He began the 1984 season with the Tides, hitting only .219 in 44 games with them. He ended up in the Chicago White Sox organization, and with the Denver Zephyrs he hit .306. Overall, Tillman hit .273 with 12 home runs in 119 games in 1984.

He ended up back in the Mets organization following the 1984 season, and on March 31, 1985, he was traded to the San Diego Padres for Rick Lancellotti. He played for the Las Vegas Stars in 1985, hitting .337 with 12 home runs and 18 stolen bases in 115 games.

Tillman started 1986 in the Padres organization, playing for the Stars, but on April 18, 1986, he was traded to the Athletics for Bob Stoddard and minor leaguer Kevin Russ. He played for the Tacoma Tigers in the A's organization after being traded. He also played 22 games in the big leagues, hitting .256 in 39 at-bats. On September 23, he hit the first home run of his career – off of Hall of Fame pitcher Steve Carlton. In the minors that year, he hit .314 in 74 games.

On March 20, 1987, the Athletics released Tillman, and on April 26 the San Francisco Giants signed him. He played for the Phoenix Firebirds that year, hitting .316 with 10 home runs in 94 games. In 1988, he played for the Firebirds again, hitting .295 with 12 home runs. With the Giants in 1988, he appeared in four games, collecting one hit in four at-bats. His lone hit of 1988 – and the final hit of his career – was a home run, a three-run shot off of Cincinnati Reds pitcher Tim Birtsas. On June 18, he played in his final big league game, and on October 15, he was granted free-agency by the Giants.

He stuck around in the minors until 1989. That year, he played in the Giants, Houston Astros and Texas Rangers farm systems, hitting a combined .279 with six home runs for the Firebirds, Tucson Toros and Tulsa Drillers.

Overall, he hit .232 with two home runs and three stolen bases in 38 big league games. In the minors, he hit .297 with 82 home runs and 209 stolen bases in 1,146 games.
