= Jerry Kutzler =

American baseball player (born 1965)

- Pitcher
- Born: March 25, 1965; Waukegan, Illinois, U.S.
- Batted: Left Threw: Right

MLB debut
- April 28, 1990, for the Chicago White Sox

Last MLB appearance
- May 31, 1990, for the Chicago White Sox

MLB statistics
- Win–loss record: 2–1
- Earned run average: 6.03
- Strikeouts: 21
- Stats at Baseball Reference

Teams
- Chicago White Sox (1990)

Jerry Scott Kutzler (born March 25, 1965) is an American former baseball pitcher. A right-handed starting pitcher, Kutzler appeared in seven games for Major League Baseball's (MLB) Chicago White Sox in the 1990 season. He earned his first MLB victory by defeating the Toronto Blue Jays 5–4 in the first game of his major league career on April 28, 1990. Overall, he posted a 2–1 won–loss record and a 6.03 earned run average. Kutzler pitched for nine seasons in the United States professional system and one in the Mexican League with Guerreros de Oaxaca. He taught physical education at Lance Middle School in Kenosha, Wisconsin.
