= Tom Dozier =

American baseball player

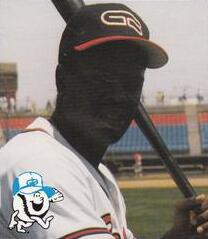
- Dozier with the Greenville Braves c. 1988
- Pitcher
- Born: September 5, 1961 (age 64); San Pablo, California, U.S.
- Batted: Right Threw: Right

MLB debut
- May 17, 1986, for the Oakland Athletics

Last MLB appearance
- June 1, 1986, for the Oakland Athletics

MLB statistics
- Win–loss record: 0–0
- Earned run average: 5.68
- Strikeouts: 4
- Stats at Baseball Reference

Teams
- Oakland Athletics (1986)

Thomas Dean Dozier (born September 5, 1961) is an American former Major League Baseball pitcher. He played for the Oakland Athletics during the 1986 season.
