= Ralph Citarella =

American baseball player (born 1958)

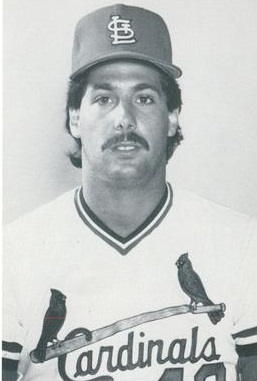
- Pitcher
- Born: February 7, 1958 (age 68); East Orange, New Jersey, U.S.
- Batted: Right Threw: Right

debut
- September 13, 1983, for the St. Louis Cardinals

Last appearance
- July 10, 1987, for the Chicago White Sox

Career statistics
- Win–loss record: 0–1
- Earned run average: 4.06
- Strikeouts: 28
- Stats at Baseball Reference

Teams
- St. Louis Cardinals (1983–1984); Chicago White Sox (1987)

Ralph Alexander Citarella (born February 7, 1958) is an American former Major League Baseball pitcher. The right-hander was drafted by the St. Louis Cardinals in the 1st round (12th pick) of the 1979 amateur draft (secondary phase), and he played for the Cardinals (1983–1984) and Chicago White Sox (1987).

Raised in Woodbridge Township, New Jersey, Citarella played prep baseball at Bishop Ahr High School (since renamed as St. Thomas Aquinas High School).

On September 13, 1983, Citarella made his major league debut in relief at Three Rivers Stadium. He struck out the first batter he faced, catcher Tony Peña, in the 7th inning. In 1.2 innings that night he gave up one hit (a double to Johnny Ray) and one earned run, and the Cards lost, 6–0.

Citarella was successful in his two short stints with St. Louis, posting ERAs of 1.64 and 3.63, but didn't fare as well with the White Sox in 1987. In five appearances, he gave up nine earned runs in eleven innings, including four home runs. He retired in 1988 after pitching for multiple minor league teams at the AAA, AA, and A levels between 1985 and 1988.

In 3 seasons he appeared in a total of 21 games and had a 0–1 record, 2 starts, 0 complete games, and 6 games finished. In 44.1 innings pitched he gave up 20 earned runs for an ERA of 4.06, and had a strikeout-to-walk ratio of 2 to 1 (28 strikeouts and 14 walks).

Citarella made his first MLB start on June 23, 1984, a nationally televised NBC Game of the Week at Wrigley Field versus the Chicago Cubs. He pitched 5.1 innings and hit an RBI single that sparked a six-run second inning for the Cardinals. The Cardinals held a 9-3 lead when Citarella left the game in the sixth inning with two runners on base. That meant Citarella would have earned his first major-league win, even though both of those Cub base runners scored, if the Cardinals had maintained the lead. The high-scoring extra-inning affair came to be known as the "Sandberg Game" in recognition of Cubs second baseman Ryne Sandberg, who homered to tie the game in the ninth inning and again in the tenth against Bruce Sutter.

In 2006, Citarella became the Athletic Relations Liaison for the Habana Joe Trading Company for its Dock to Dine men's clothing line. From 2012 to 2013, Citarella served as the pitching coach for the New Jersey-based Newark Bears of the independent Can-Am League.
