= Bill Long (baseball) =

American baseball player (born 1960)

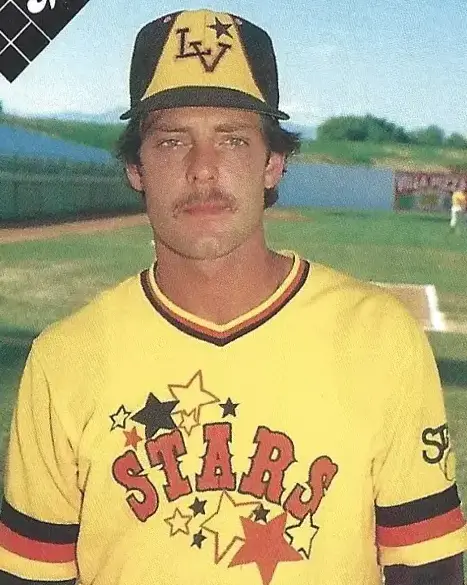
- Long with the Las Vegas Stars c. 1983
- Pitcher
- Born: February 29, 1960 (age 66); Cincinnati, Ohio, U.S.
- Batted: Right Threw: Right

MLB debut
- July 21, 1985, for the Chicago White Sox

Last MLB appearance
- April 14, 1991, for the Montreal Expos

MLB statistics
- Win–loss record: 27–27
- Earned run average: 4.37
- Strikeouts: 247
- Stats at Baseball Reference

Teams
- Chicago White Sox (1985–1990); Chicago Cubs (1990); Montreal Expos (1991)

William Douglas Long (born February 29, 1960) is an American former professional baseball pitcher who played from 1985 to 1991 for the Chicago White Sox (1985–1990), Chicago Cubs (1990) and Montreal Expos (1991).

== Early life ==
Long was born in Cincinnati, Ohio, and graduated from Moeller High School. He played college football at Miami University in Oxford, Ohio.

== Professional career ==
Long was drafted by the San Diego Padres in the 2nd round of the 1981 MLB amateur draft. Before the 1985 season, Long was traded by the San Diego Padres, along with Ozzie Guillén, Luis Salazar and Tim Lollar, to the White Sox, in the same deal that brought Cy Young Award winner LaMarr Hoyt to San Diego. Long played his first professional game on July 21, 1985, with the Chicago White Sox. In a six-season career, Long posted a 27-27 record with a 4.37 ERA and nine saves in 159 games pitched, 52 as a starter. According to Long, he also played in Caracas, Venezuela. While Long played in Venezuela, he played for the Leones del Caracas, and the Cardenales de Lara.He batted and threw right-handed.

=== Best season ===
- 1987: Led American League pitchers with a 1.49 W/9IP (28 walks in 169.0 innings pitched)

== See also ==
- Montreal Expos all-time roster
- Chicago White Sox all-time roster
