= Donnie Hill =

American baseball player (born 1960)

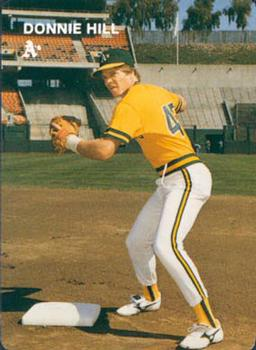
- Infielder
- Born: November 12, 1960 (age 65); Pomona, California, U.S.
- Batted: Switch Threw: Right

MLB debut
- July 25, 1983, for the Oakland Athletics

Last MLB appearance
- July 11, 1992, for the Minnesota Twins

MLB statistics
- Batting average: .257
- Home runs: 26
- Runs batted in: 228
- Stats at Baseball Reference

Teams
- Oakland Athletics (1983–1986); Chicago White Sox (1987–1988); California Angels (1990–1991); Minnesota Twins (1992)

Donald Earl Hill (born November 12, 1960) is an American former professional baseball player who played nine seasons for the Oakland Athletics, Chicago White Sox, California Angels, and Minnesota Twins of Major League Baseball.

Hill moved from Pomona to Huntington Beach when he was 13 years old. He then went on to play baseball at Edison High School for Ron LaRuffa and was on the state champion Orange Coast College team for Mike Mayne. He then moved on to Division 1 where he was a member of the 1981 College World Series-winning Arizona State team under Jim Brock.

Hill is currently a golf instructor at Strawberry Farms Golf Course and No Bogeys Golf, in Orange County, California.
