= Ozzie Guillén =

Venezuelan baseball player and manager (born 1964)

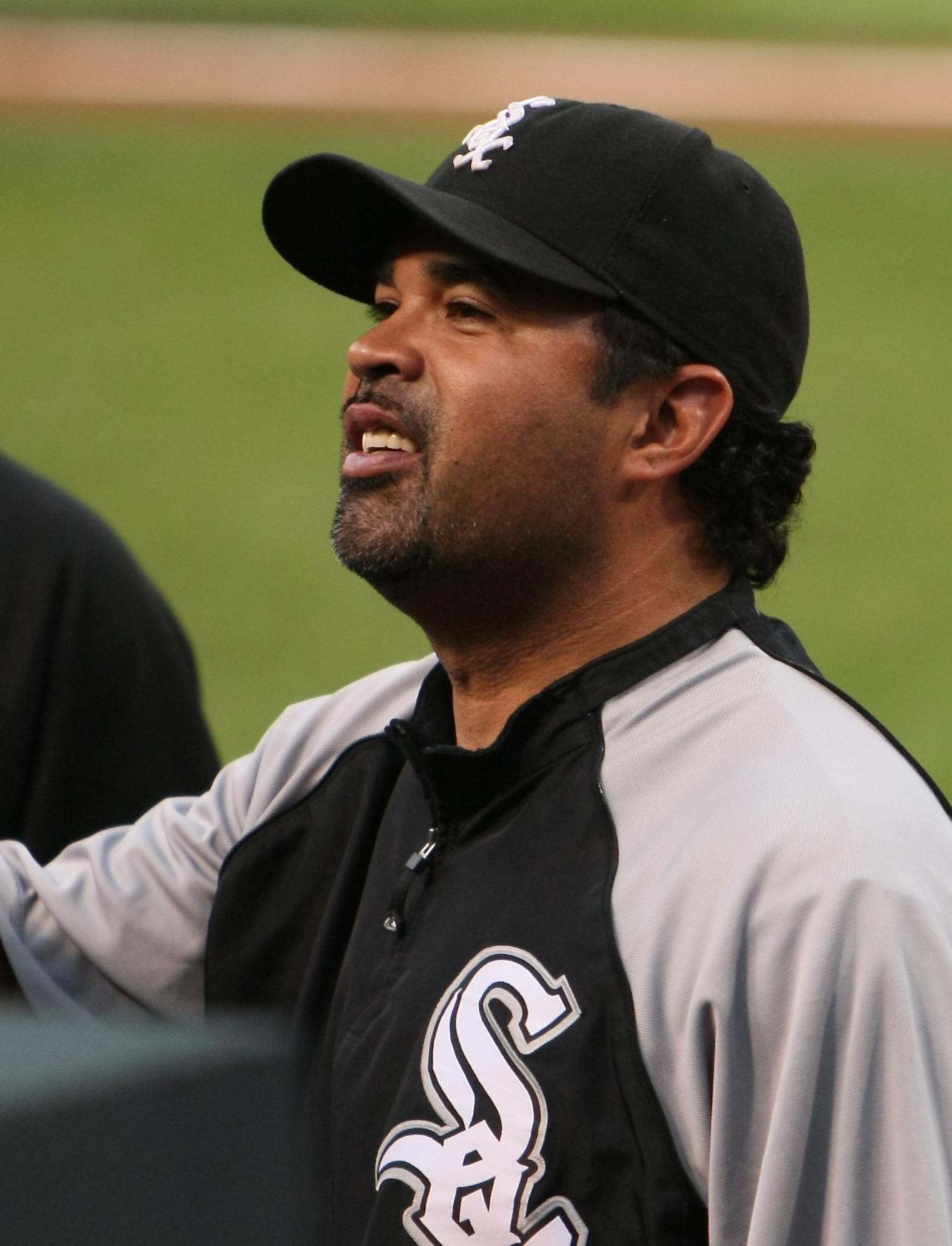
- Guillén in 2008
- Shortstop / Manager
- Born: January 20, 1964 (age 62); Ocumare del Tuy, Venezuela
- Batted: Left Threw: Right

MLB debut
- April 9, 1985, for the Chicago White Sox

Last MLB appearance
- October 1, 2000, for the Tampa Bay Devil Rays

MLB statistics
- Batting average: .264
- Home runs: 28
- Runs batted in: 619
- Managerial record: 747–710
- Winning %: .513
- Stats at Baseball Reference
- Managerial record at Baseball Reference

Teams
- As player: Chicago White Sox (1985–1997); Baltimore Orioles (1998); Atlanta Braves (1998–1999); Tampa Bay Devil Rays (2000); As manager: Chicago White Sox (2004–2011); Miami Marlins (2012); As coach: Montreal Expos (2001); Florida Marlins (2002–2003)

Career highlights and awards
- 3× All-Star (1988, 1990, 1991); 2× World Series champion (2003, 2005); AL Rookie of the Year (1985); Gold Glove Award (1990); AL Manager of the Year (2005); Chicago White Sox No. 13 retired

Member of the Venezuelan

Baseball Hall of Fame
- Induction: 2011

Oswaldo José Guillén Barrios (Spanish pronunciation: [ɡiˈʎen]; born January 20, 1964) is a Venezuelan former professional baseball player and manager. He played in Major League Baseball as a shortstop from 1985 to 2000, most prominently as a member of the Chicago White Sox, where he won the American League Rookie of the Year Award as well as a Gold Glove Award. A three-time All-Star player, Guillén was considered one of the best defensive shortstops of his era. He later managed the Chicago White Sox from 2004 to 2011, winning the World Series in 2005 and then moving to the Miami Marlins in 2012.

As a player, Guillén was known for his passion, speed, hustle, intensity, defensive abilities and his ebullient love for the game. In 2005, Guillen became the first Latino manager in major league history to win a World Series when he captained the Chicago White Sox to their first championship in 88 years. Along with Tommy Lasorda, he is one of only two managers in baseball history to win a World Series, a winter league championship (in his native Venezuela), and a Caribbean Series title.

== Playing career ==
Guillén was a light-hitting, quick-handed shortstop, emerging from a line of Venezuelan shortstops that included Chico Carrasquel, Luis Aparicio (both White Sox players), Dave Concepción, and Omar Vizquel (who Guillen later managed with the White Sox). He was originally signed as a free agent by the San Diego Padres in 1980. In December 1984, he was traded to the Chicago White Sox as part of an eight-player trade, with Tim Lollar, Bill Long and Luis Salazar in exchange for LaMarr Hoyt.

In 1985, Guillén was both the American League Rookie of the Year and The Sporting News Rookie of the Year, while also becoming just the third rookie shortstop in major league history to win a fielding title. He became known for his daring, aggressive style of play, as was demonstrated on August 2, 1985, in a game against the New York Yankees. With the game tied 5–5 in the 11th inning, Guillén hit a two-out single and, then proceeded to steal second base. When the next batter hit an infield single, Guillén never hesitated as he rounded third base, catching the Yankees defense off guard and scored the game-winning run.

In 1989, Guillén was the victim of a hidden ball trick twice. First on June 23 when Greg Brock tagged him out when Guillén, the runner at first base, took his lead, and then had to dive back to the base on a pick off throw from the pitcher. Brock held the ball instead of throwing it back to the pitcher, and when Guillén took his hand off the base to stand up, Brock tagged him out. On August 5, Dave Bergman made the same play, holding onto the ball following a pick off throw. Guillén again dove to the base to beat the throw, and when he took his hand off the base to stand up, Bergman tagged him on top of the batting helmet without looking at him.

On April 21, 1992, Guillén suffered a severe knee injury in a collision with outfielder Tim Raines. The injury caused him to miss almost the entire season, and subsequently diminished his defensive range as well as his stolen base output for the remainder of his career. Guillén recovered in 1993 with his most productive season offensively, posting a .280 batting average, and he hit a career-high four home runs and had 50 runs batted in (RBI) in 134 games. The White Sox went on to win the American League Western Division title. He hit .273 and scored four runs in the 1993 American League Championship Series as the White Sox were defeated by the Toronto Blue Jays in six games.

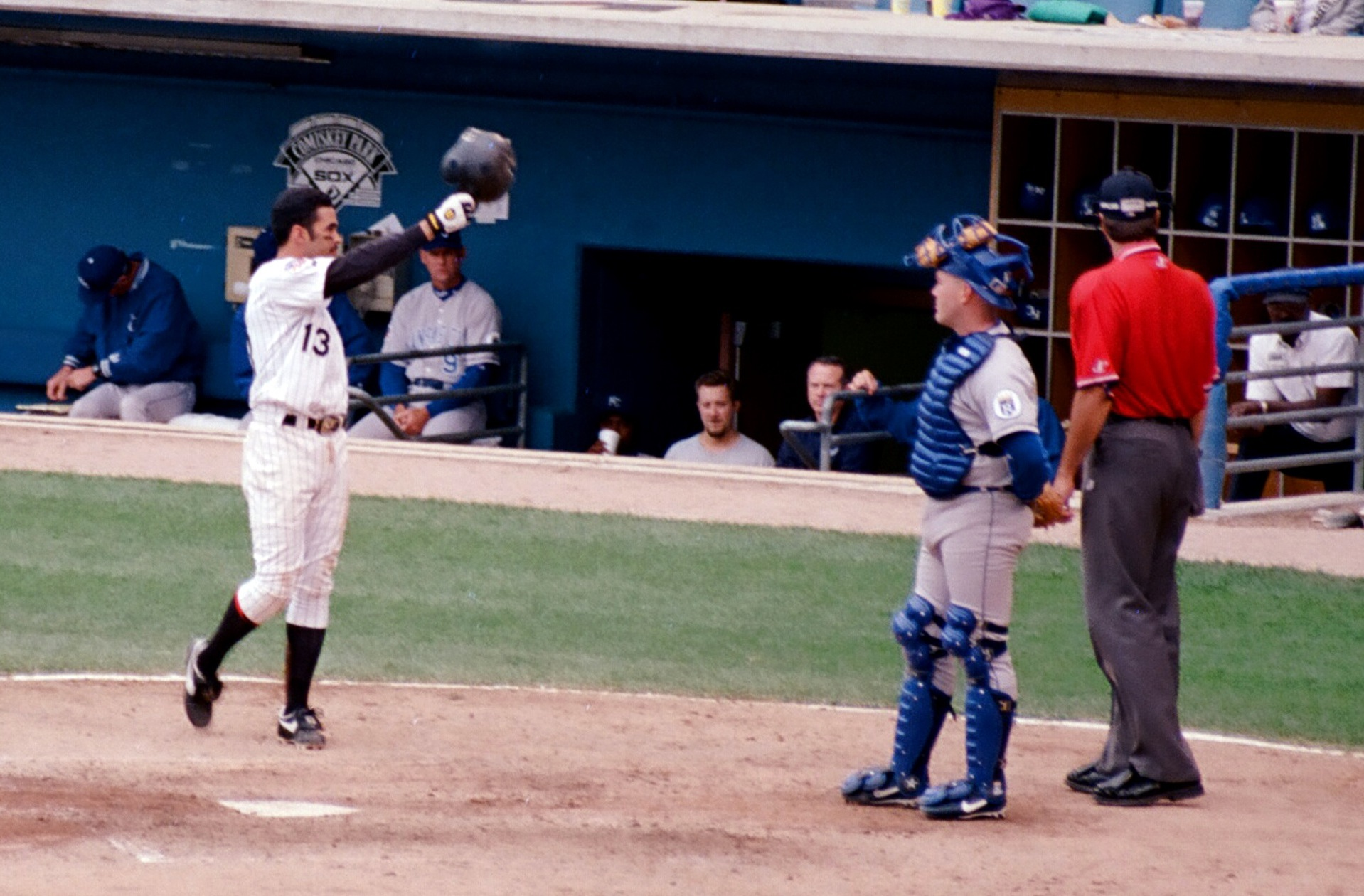
Guillén tips his helmet to the Comiskey Park crowd before his last at-bat with the White Sox – September 28, 1997

In October 1997, after 13 seasons with the White Sox, Guillén elected free agency and signed a contract to play for the Baltimore Orioles. In May 1998, the Orioles released him, and he signed with the Atlanta Braves. He helped Atlanta win the 1999 National League Championship Series against the New York Mets with a 10th inning, pinch hit single in Game 6 that tied the score at nine runs apiece, as the Braves went on to win the game and the series. The Braves would eventually lose to the New York Yankees in Guillén's only World Series appearance as a player. After playing one year with the Tampa Bay Devil Rays in 2000, he retired as a player at the end of the season at the age of 36.

=== Career statistics ===
In a 16-year major league career, Guillén played in 1,993 games, accumulating 1,764 hits in 6,686 at bats for a .264 batting average along with 28 home runs, 619 RBI, and a .287 on-base percentage. Guillén was an All-Star in 1988, 1990, and 1991 and won a Gold Glove Award in 1990. He led American League shortstops twice in range factor, once in assists, and once in fielding percentage. Guillén's .974 career fielding percentage ranks 63rd all time among major league shortstops as of 2024, ahead of, among others, of both Luis Aparicio and Dave Concepción. While he was considered one of the best fielding shortstops in the American League, Guillén was often overlooked in post-season fielding awards because his playing career coincided with those of Tony Fernandez, Cal Ripken Jr., and Omar Vizquel. This trio would win every American League Gold Glove for a shortstop from 1986 until 2001, aside from Guillén's win in 1990. Guillén ranks among the White Sox all-time leaders in games played (sixth), hits (seventh), at-bats (sixth), plate appearances (seventh), total bases (10th) and triples (10th). As a hitter, he was known as a free swinger, posting one of the highest at bats per walk ratios in major league history and also one of the lowest on base percentages for many of the years he played.

Guillén played his entire Venezuelan Winter League career with Tiburones de La Guaira.

== Managerial career ==
=== Chicago White Sox ===
Ozzie Guillén's number 13 was retired by the Chicago White Sox in 2026.

Following his playing career, Guillén coached for the Montreal Expos in 2001 and 2002 and the World champion Florida Marlins (now known as the Miami Marlins) in 2003. That offseason, he replaced Jerry Manuel as the White Sox manager. He received a standing ovation from the crowd of 37,706 fans when introduced before his first game as a manager at U.S. Cellular Field on April 13, 2004. On May 30, 2005, the White Sox extended Guillén's contract, making the move while the team had the best record in the majors (33–17).

In 2005, he led the White Sox to their first American League pennant since 1959, and their first World Series win since 1917 with a four-game sweep of the Houston Astros. Guillén claimed that he might retire after the 2005 season should the White Sox win the World Series, but at the parade celebrating the World Champions he received cheers from the fans when he announced he would indeed return to manage the next season. The White Sox picked up the 2006 option on his contract, added two more years and included an option for the 2009 season. In November, Guillén was voted the 2005 American League Manager of the Year Award by the Baseball Writers' Association of America. On September 11, 2007, Guillén signed another contract extension with the White Sox through the 2012 season.

On September 4, 2009, Guillén won his 500th game as manager of the Chicago White Sox as the White Sox defeated the Boston Red Sox by a score of 12–2. Guillen has publicly stated that he feels the 2003 steroids list should be released to the public.

Personal difficulties with White Sox General Manager Kenny Williams led to speculation dating back to October 2010 that the White Sox would allow Guillén out of his contract to manage the Marlins. On September 26, 2011, an inability to get a contract extension worked out with the White Sox eventually led to his being released from his position, with the White Sox retaining the right to receive compensation should Guillén manage in the 2012 season. He finished with a record of 678 wins and 617 losses. His #13 jersey was retired by the team on August 8, 2026 in a pregame ceremony attended by many players Guillén played with and coached.

=== Miami Marlins ===
On September 28, 2011, the Miami Marlins introduced Guillén as their new manager. Robin Ventura replaced Guillén as manager of the White Sox. The Marlins sent Jhan Mariñez and Osvaldo Martínez to the Chicago White Sox as compensation for the hiring of Guillén by the Marlins, as Guillen had one year remaining on his contract with the White Sox.

The Marlins were expected to contend in their first year in their new park. However, an 8–18 June effectively ended their season, and they finished 69–93, their worst season since the start of the century. On October 23, 2012, Guillen was terminated from the Marlins, despite three years remaining on his contract, after making some inflammatory comments about Fidel Castro earlier in the year.

=== Tiburones de La Guaira ===
In February 2016, Guillen was hired to manage the Tiburones de La Guaira of the Venezuelan Professional Baseball League for the 2016–17 season.

Guillen returned to manage Tiburones for the 2023–24 season, their first championship season in 38 years. He won the LVBP championship and managed and win the Series with the team at the 2024 Caribbean Series, held at LoanDepot Park in Miami, where he had once managed the Marlins.

=== Other teams ===
In 2022, he was named bench coach for France in the World Baseball Classic, joining the staff of manager Bruce Bochy. The French team competed in a qualifier in Regensburg, Germany in September 2022.

=== Managerial record ===
As of December 17, 2014

Team	Year	Regular season					Postseason			
Team	Year	Games	Won	Lost	Win %	Finish	Won	Lost	Win %	Result
CWS	2004	162	83	79	.512	2nd in AL Central	–	–	–	–
CWS	2005	162	99	63	.611	1st in AL Central	11	1	.917	Won World Series (HOU)
CWS	2006	162	90	72	.556	3rd in AL Central	–	–	–	–
CWS	2007	162	72	90	.444	4th in AL Central	–	–	–	–
CWS	2008	163	89	74	.546	1st in AL Central	1	3	.250	Lost ALDS (TB)
CWS	2009	162	79	83	.488	3rd in AL Central	–	–	–	–
CWS	2010	162	88	74	.543	2nd in AL Central	–	–	–	–
CWS	2011	160	78	82	.488	released	–	–	–	–
CWS total		1295	678	617	.524		12	4	.750	
MIA	2012	162	69	93	.426	5th in NL East	–	–	–	–
MIA total		162	69	93	.426		0	0	–	
Total		1457	747	710	.513		12	4	.750	

== Broadcasting career ==
Guillén joined ESPN Deportes in 2013, where he has worked as baseball color analyst and talk show panelist. He is currently a studio analyst for Chicago Sports Network before and after White Sox games, having joined coverage for the team in 2019 with its prior network, NBC Sports Chicago.

== Personal life ==
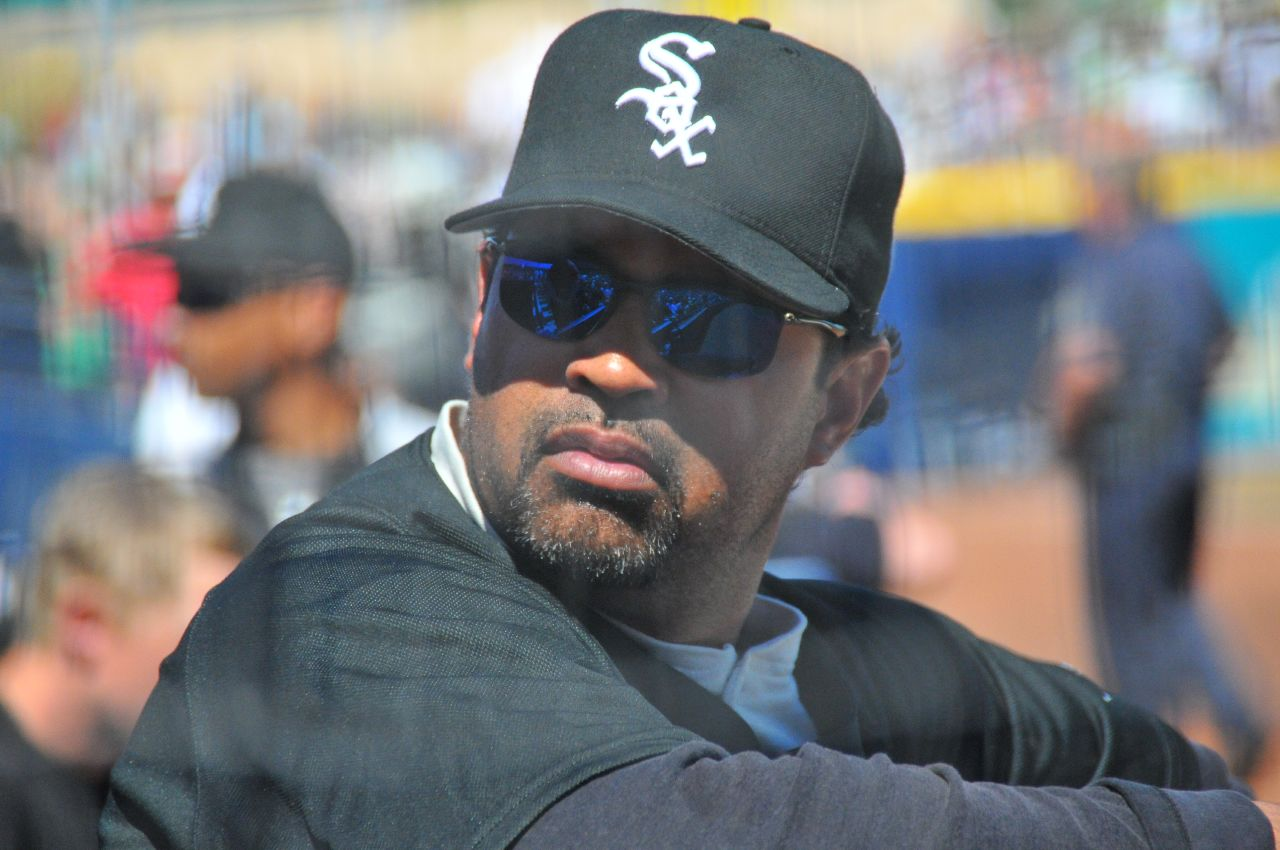
Guillén in 2008

Guillén married Ibis Cárdenas in 1983. They have three sons: Ozwaldo "Ozzie" Jr. (born 1985), Oney (born 1986), and Ozney (born 1992). Ozzie Jr. was born in Las Vegas, Nevada; his two younger brothers were born in Venezuela. When Ozzie Guillen turned 42 in January 2006, he, his wife, and son Oney became naturalized U.S. citizens. Ozzie Jr. is the lead Spanish-language broadcaster on the White Sox radio network.

He is also the brother-in-law of former White Sox teammate Scott Radinsky.

== Controversies ==
Guillen is known for being somewhat eccentric and outspoken, which sometimes lands him in the middle of controversy. He stirred controversy by declining to join the team for the traditional visit to the White House in favor of going on vacation after the 2005 White Sox World Series win.

In June 2006 he was quoted as calling Chicago Sun-Times columnist Jay Mariotti a fag. He later apologized for offending any LGBTQ people, but did not back down in his criticism of Mariotti.

In 2010, he spoke against Arizona's new law to deal with illegal immigration. Guillen described illegal immigrants as "workaholics." "And this country can't survive without them," he said. "There are a lot of people from this country who are lazy. We're not. Prove me wrong. A lot of people in this country want to be on the computer and send e-mails to people. We do the hard work. We're the ones who go out and work in the sun to make this country better." In August, Guillen said that Asian players were treated better than Latino players, stating that while it is common practice for major league clubs to provide a Japanese or Korean translator for their Asian born players, no such translator is provided for their Spanish-speaking Latin American ballplayers.

On April 10, 2012, Guillén was suspended for five games by the Marlins due to comments made about former Cuban president Fidel Castro. In a Time interview Guillen said, "I love Fidel Castro ... I respect Fidel Castro. You know why? A lot of people have wanted to kill Fidel Castro for the last [53] years, but that mofo is still here." The fallout from those comments was a major factor in his ouster after the season; according to Marlins baseball operations chief Larry Beinfest, the Marlins' attendance flatlined after those remarks and never recovered; although the Marlins actually reached over two million fans in attendance that season (the third and so far last time that has happened for the Marlins), it was more due to the allure of a brand new stadium, Marlins Park.

== See also ==
- List of Major League Baseball players from Venezuela
