= Scott Nielsen =

American baseball player (born 1958)

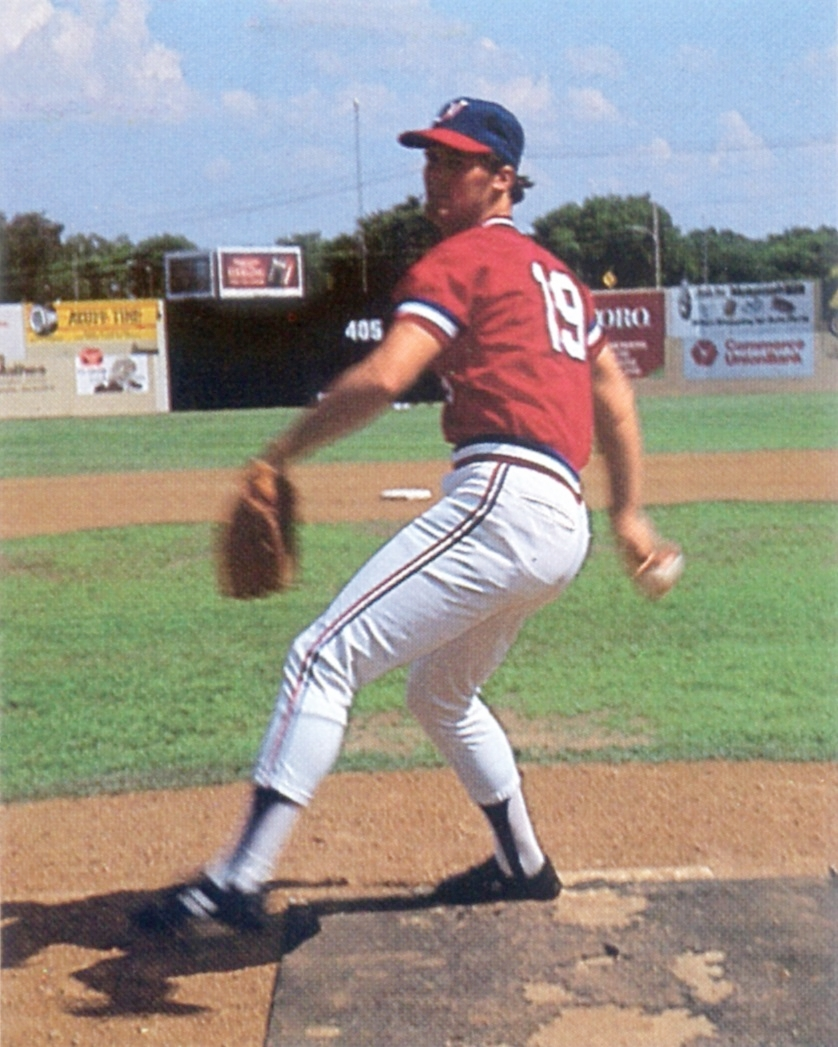
- Nielsen with the Nashville Sounds in 1984
- Pitcher
- Born: December 18, 1958 (age 67); Salt Lake City, Utah, U.S.
- Batted: Right Threw: Right

MLB debut
- July 7, 1986, for the New York Yankees

Last MLB appearance
- June 14, 1989, for the New York Yankees

MLB statistics
- Win–loss record: 9–11
- Earned run average: 5.49
- Strikeouts: 47
- Stats at Baseball Reference

Teams
- New York Yankees (1986, 1988–1989); Chicago White Sox (1987)

Jeffrey Scott Nielsen (born December 18, 1958) is an American former Major League Baseball pitcher. He played during four seasons at the major league level for the New York Yankees and Chicago White Sox. He was drafted by the Seattle Mariners in the 6th round of the 1983 amateur draft. Nielsen, played his first professional season with their Class A (Short Season) Bellingham Mariners in 1983, and his last season with the New York Mets' Triple-A club, the Tidewater Tides, in 1990.

Nielsen was a college baseball player at Brigham Young University. He interrupted his collegiate career to serve a Mission in Argentina for The Church of Jesus Christ of Latter-Day Saints.
