= Adam Peterson (1990s pitcher) =

American baseball player (born 1965)

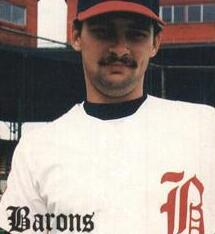
- Peterson with the Birmingham Barons c. 1987
- Pitcher
- Born: December 11, 1965 (age 59); Long Beach, California, U.S.
- Batted: Right Threw: Right

MLB debut
- September 19, 1987, for the Chicago White Sox

Last MLB appearance
- August 6, 1991, for the San Diego Padres

MLB statistics
- Win–loss record: 5–11
- Earned run average: 5.46
- Strikeouts: 75
- Stats at Baseball Reference

Teams
- Chicago White Sox (1987–1990); San Diego Padres (1991)

Adam Charles Peterson (born December 11, 1965) is an American former professional baseball pitcher. Peterson spent parts of five seasons in the majors between 1987 and 1991 with the Chicago White Sox and San Diego Padres of the Major League Baseball (MLB).

Peterson is a 1984 graduate of Timpview High School.

In 1989 he led the Vancouver Canadians, who at that time were the Triple-A affiliates for the Chicago White Sox, to victory in the Triple-A World Series, pitching 25 games and going 14-5 for the season with a 2.27 ERA, earning MVP honors as a result.
