= Deaths in May 1990 =

The following is a list of notable deaths in May 1990.

Entries for each day are listed alphabetically by surname. A typical entry lists information in the following sequence:

- Name, age, country of citizenship at birth, subsequent country of citizenship (if applicable), reason for notability, cause of death (if known), and reference.

== May 1990 ==
=== 1 ===
- Fred Blackburn, 87, British politician.
- Sunset Carson, 69, American actor.
- Heciyê Cindî, 82, Kurdish linguist and researcher from Armenia.
- Ștefan Czinczer, 84, Romanian footballer.
- Djalma Dias, 50, Brazilian footballer, cardiopulmonary arrest.
- Sergio Franchi, 64, Italian-American singer and actor, brain cancer.
- Lothar Geitler, 90, Austrian botanist.
- Oskar Kuhn, 82, German palaeontologist.
- Rab Bruce Lockhart, 73, Scottish rugby player and academic.
- Jindřich Maudr, 84, Czechoslovak Olympic wrestler (1928, 1932)..
- Frits Warmolt Went, 86, Dutch-American biologist.

=== 2 ===
- Germain Bazin, 88, French art historian.
- Ronald Berndt, 73, Australian anthropologist.
- Ann Casson, 74, English actress.
- William L. Dawson, 90, American composer.
- Evert Johansson, 86, Finnish Olympic canoeist (1936).
- Andy McPartland, 74, Australian rules footballer.
- David Rappaport, 38, English actor (Time Bandits, The Wizard, The Bride), suicide by gunshot.
- Giacomo Scalet, 80, Italian Olympic cross-country skier (1936).

=== 3 ===
- Carlos Cerutti, 21, Argentine basketball player, traffic collision.
- Dovima, 62, American supermodel, liver cancer.
- Audrey Ferris, 80, American actress.
- Mathilda Guez, 71, French Tunisian-Israeli politician.
- Karl Ibach, 75, German politician.
- Shōtarō Ikenami, 67, Japanese author, leukemia.
- Pimen I of Moscow, 79, Soviet patriarch of the Russian Orthodox Church (since 1970).
- Charlie Richards, 79, Australian rules footballer.
- Mary Lea Johnson Richards, 63, American theatre producer, liver cancer.
- George Wilson, 84, American football player.

=== 4 ===
- Luther Clifford, 66, American baseball player.
- John Ormond, 67, Welsh poet.
- Emily Remler, 32, American guitarist, heart failure.
- Jim Schelle, 73, American baseball player (Philadelphia Athletics).
- Shepard Stone, 82, American journalist.
- Johnny Wright, 73, American baseball player.

=== 5 ===
- Endre Bohem, 89, Hungarian-American filmmaker.
- Walter Bruch, 82, German electrical engineer and television pioneer.
- Ruy Duarte, 78, Brazilian Olympic modern pentathlete (1936).
- Reginald Goodall, 88, English conductor.
- Cecilia H. Hauge, 94, American nurse.
- Jean Keller, 84, French Olympic runner (1924, 1928, 1932).
- Elton Rule, 72, American television executive (American Broadcasting Company).
- Karl Thielscher, 95, American football player.

=== 6 ===
- Paul Blessing, 71, American NFL player (Detroit Lions).
- Carlos de Cárdenas Jr., 57, Cuban Olympic sailor (1948, 1952, 1960).
- Charles Farrell, 89, American actor, heart failure.
- Lotte Jacobi, 93, Prussian-American photographer.
- Verner Løvgreen, 79, Danish Olympic canoeist (1936).
- Irmtraud Morgner, 56, German writer, cancer.
- Eduardo Nicol, 83, Mexican-Catalan philosopher.

=== 7 ===
- Ann Bishop, 90, English biologist, pneumonia.
- Elizete Cardoso, 69, Brazilian singer and actress, cancer.
- Maurice Carlton, 76, French Olympic sprinter (1936).
- Ashley Lawrence, 55, New Zealand conductor.
- Nicholas Sanduleak, 56, American astronomer, cardiac arrest, heart attack.
- Sam Tambimuttu, 58, Sri Lankan Tamil lawyer and politician.
- Charlie Walker, 78, English football player.
- Prince Andrej of Yugoslavia, 60, Yugoslav royal, suicide by carbon monoxide poisoning.

=== 8 ===
- Severt Dennolf, 69, Swedish Olympic long distance runner (1948).
- Tomás Ó Fiaich, 66, Irish Roman Catholic cardinal, heart attack.
- June James, 27, American football player (Detroit Lions, Indianapolis Colts), traffic collision.
- Luigi Nono, 66, Italian composer.
- Edsard Schlingemann, 23, Dutch Olympic swimmer (1984), traffic collision.
- Rudolf Sellner, 84, German actor.

=== 9 ===
- Lü Wei, 23–24, Chinese diver, murdered.
- Pauline Frederick, 82, American journalist, heart attack.
- David Stuart Parker, 71, American territorial administrator, heart failure.
- Patrick Piggott, 75, English composer.
- Misha Raitzin, 59–60, Soviet-Israeli-American singer, lung aneurysm.
- George Kennedy Young, 79, British politician.

=== 10 ===
- Hilda Buck, 75, New Zealand cricket player.
- Walter Mahan, 87, American football player (Frankford Yellow Jackets).
- Susan Oliver, 58, American actress and aviator, colorectal cancer.
- Walker Percy, 73, American philosophical writer, prostate cancer.

=== 11 ===
- Gérardo Apruzzese, 87, French Olympic wrestler (1924).
- Stratos Dionysiou, 54, Greek singer, aortic aneurysm.
- Heidemarie Hatheyer, 78, Austrian actress.
- Winford Stokes, 39, American convicted serial killer, execution by lethal injection.
- David Wade, 78, American general.
- Harry Whittle, 68, British hurdler and Olympian (1948, 1952).
- Hanne Wieder, 65, German actress, cancer.
- Venedikt Yerofeyev, 51, Soviet writer and dissident, throat cancer.

=== 12 ===
- Bill Bufalino, 72, American Mafia lawyer, leukemia.
- John E. Davis, 77, American politician, governor of North Dakota (1957–1961).
- Andrei Kirilenko, 83, Soviet politician.
- Nate Monaster, 78, American scriptwriter.
- Anthony Masters, 70, British production designer and set decorator.
- Albert Öberg, 101, Swedish Olympic athlete (1912).
- Earl Seibert, 79, Canadian ice hockey player (New York Rangers, Chicago Black Hawks, Detroit Red Wings), brain cancer.

=== 13 ===
- Jorge Garate, 72, Argentine film editor.
- Albert Hendrickx, 73, Belgian racing cyclist.
- Ray Jennison, 80, American football player (Green Bay Packers).
- Hans Raff, 79, German Olympic runner (1936).

=== 14 ===
- André Amellér, 78, French composer.
- Georgi Eftimov, 59, Bulgarian Olympic footballer (1952).
- Gerald T. Flynn, 79, American politician, member of the U.S. House of Representatives (1959–1961).
- George Holliday, 73, British Olympic bobsledder (1948).
- Tarcisio Longoni, 76, Italian politician.
- Ruth Mason, 76, New Zealand botanist.
- Mary Oppen, 81, American poet, ovarian cancer.
- Bill Pace, 58, American football player.
- Ned Pines, 84, American publisher.
- Franklyn Seales, 37, American actor, AIDS.

=== 15 ===
- Jerzy Drzewiecki, 87, Polish airplane engineer.
- Peter Grimwade, 47, British television director and screenwriter, leukemia.
- Ray Pratt, 75, Australian rugby league player.
- Anna Schchian, 84, Soviet botanist.
- Yves Van Massenhove, 81, Belgian Olympic racing cyclist (1928).
- Doug Young, 81, Canadian ice hockey player (Detroit Red Wings, Montreal Canadiens).

=== 16 ===
- Luis Aldás, 80, Argentine actor.
- Rein Aren, 62, Soviet actor.
- Red Carr, 73, Canadian NHL player (Toronto Maple Leafs).
- Fernando Claudín, 74, Spanish historian.
- Sammy Davis Jr., 64, American singer ("The Candy Man") and actor (Ocean's 11, The Cannonball Run), throat cancer.
- Robert Gall, 71, French lyricist.
- Jim Henson, 53, American puppeteer (The Muppets) and film director (Labyrinth, The Dark Crystal), toxic shock syndrome.
- Eduardo Mateo, 49, Uruguayan singer, songwriter, and guitarist, cancer.
- Pretzel Pezzullo, 79, American baseball player (Philadelphia Phillies), cancer.
- Alija Sirotanović, 75, Yugoslav udarnik.

=== 17 ===
- Manuel Anatol, 87, French footballer.
- Rudolf Breuss, 91, Austrian naturopath and pseudoscientific diet advocate.
- Ken Bryant, 67, Australian rules footballer.
- Auguste Jordan, 81, French footballer.
- Jimmy Lawrence, 76, American gridiron football player.
- Per Ljostveit, 61, Norwegian footballer.
- Detlev Peukert, 39, German historian, AIDS.
- Carlos Riquelme, 76, Mexican actor.
- Jackie Stewart, 68, Scottish footballer.
- Frank Wright, 54, American jazz musician.

=== 18 ===
- Joseph-Marie Trịnh Văn Căn, 69, Vietnamese Roman Catholic cardinal.
- Jill Ireland, 54, English actress and singer, breast cancer.
- Lorna Johnstone, 87, English Olympic equestrian (1956, 1968, 1972).
- Karl Meyer, 90, German-American biochemist.
- Rafael Hernández Ochoa, 74, Mexican politician.
- Dalton Prejean, 30, American convicted murderer, execution by electrocution.
- Yannis Spyropoulos, 78, Greek painter.
- Eje Thelin, 51, Swedish trombonist.

=== 19 ===
- Jim Balfour, 75, Australian politician.
- Ted Cook, 69, American basketball player (Minneapolis Lakers).
- Olive Byrne, 86, American writer.
- Hector Dyer, 79, American Olympic sprinter (1932).
- Aladár Háberl, 92, Hungarian Olympic skier (1924).
- Hermann Wulf, 74, German Wehrmacht officer during World War II.

=== 20 ===
- Bina Mossman, 97, American musician and politician.
- Peter Rabe, 68, German-American author, lung cancer.
- Aage Rubæk-Nielsen, 76, Danish Olympic equestrian (1952).
- Franklin Williams, 72, American diplomat.

=== 21 ===
- Mrs. Victor Bruce, 94, British racer.
- Morris Levy, 62, American record executive, cancer.
- Ed Steitz, 69, American basketball coach.
- Lily von Essen, 93, Swedish Olympic tennis player (1920, 1924).
- Max Wall, 82, English actor and comedian, fall.

=== 22 ===
- Rocky Graziano, 71, American boxer, cardiopulmonary failure.
- Pat Reid, 79, British historian and soldier.
- Ling Shuhua, 90, Chinese modernist writer and painter.
- Leslie Spriggs, 80, British politician.
- Woody Williams, 71, American baseball player.
- Ronald Wood, 60, English cricketer.

=== 23 ===
- Affandi, 83, Indonesian artist.
- Charlie Keller, 73, American baseball player (New York Yankees, Detroit Tigers).
- Elliott Lewis, 72, American actor.
- Giuseppe Santomaso, 82, Italian painter and educator.
- Ted Tinling, 79, British-American fashion designer.

=== 24 ===
- Jeanne de Salzmann, 101, French-Swiss choreographer.
- Augie Donatelli, 75, American baseball umpire.
- K. S. Hegde, 80, Indian politician and judge.
- John Kendall-Carpenter, 64, English rugby player.
- Jacques Lob, 57, French comic book artist.
- Dries van der Lof, 70, Dutch racing driver.
- Julijans Vaivods, 94, Soviet Roman Catholic cardinal.

=== 25 ===
- D. S. Amalorpavadass, 57, Indian theologian.
- Athanasios Asimakopulos, 59, Canadian economist, leukemia.
- Ray Atkeson, 83, American photographer.
- Hans-Werner Kraus, 74, German U-boat commander during World War II.
- William Overgard, 64, American cartoonist.
- Vic Tayback, 60, American actor (Alice, Bullitt, All Dogs Go to Heaven), heart attack.
- Gary Usher, 51, American musician, lung cancer.

=== 26 ===
- Marguerite S. Church, 97, American politician, member of the U.S. House of Representatives (1951–1963).
- René David, 64, French legal scholar.
- Brūno Kalniņš, 91, Latvian politician and historian.
- Emil Konopinski, 78, American nuclear scientist.
- Don McFadyen, 83, Canadian ice hockey player (Chicago Black Hawks).
- Chris McGregor, 53, South African musician, lung cancer.
- Varlen Pen, 73, Soviet Russian-Korean painter and graphic artist.
- Nicole Riche, 64, French actress.

=== 27 ===
- José Del Vecchio, 73, Venezuelan physician and youth baseball promoter.
- Heino Dissing, 77, Danish Olympic racing cyclist (1936).
- Adele Duttweiler-Bertschi, 97, Swiss philanthropist.
- Emil Handschin, 62, Swiss Olympic ice hockey player (1948, 1952, 1956).
- Clarrie Heard, 83, New Zealand Olympic swimmer (1924).
- Joe McDonald Ingraham, 86, American judge.
- Pyotr Lomako, 85, Soviet politician.
- Jessie MacWilliams, 73, English mathematician.
- Robert B. Meyner, 81, American politician, governor of New Jersey (1954–1962).
- Mieko Takamine, 71, Japanese actress and singer.

=== 28 ===
- Ralph Alger Bagnold, 94, English geologist.
- Bill Davies, 74, Canadian football player.
- Julius Eastman, 49, American musician, cardiac arrest.
- Wilhelm Effern, 83, Dutch Olympic middle-distance runner (1928).
- Inna Gulaya, 50, Soviet actress, drug overdose.
- Giorgio Manganelli, 67, Italian writer.
- Taiichi Ohno, 78, Japanese industrialist (Toyota Production System).
- Wilhelm Wagenfeld, 90, German industrial designer and engineer.

=== 29 ===
- Mohamed Shah Alam, 27, Bangladeshi Olympic sprinter (1988).
- Yves Brayer, 82, French painter.
- Jimmy Creighton, 84, Canadian ice hockey player (Detroit Falcons), Parkinson's disease.
- Bill MacKenzie, 78, Canadian ice hockey player.
- Fred Patterson, 74, Australian rules footballer.
- Albert Spaulding, 75, American anthropologist.
- Alexander Tsvetkov, 75, Bulgarian chess player.

=== 30 ===
- Charles Morris, Baron Morris of Grasmere, 92, British academic.
- John Francis Hackett, 78, American prelate of the Roman Catholic Church.
- Ole Scavenius Jensen, 69, Danish Olympic rower (1952)cyclist.
- Wilderich Freiherr Ostman von der Leye, 66, German politician.
- José Solís, 76, Spanish politician.

=== 31 ===
- Clotario Blest, 90, Chilean unionist.
- Jerzy Kaliszewski, 77, Polish actor.
- Art Lund, 75, American singer.
- Michael Raffetto, 90, American actor, throat cancer.
- Archibald Bulloch Roosevelt Jr., 72, American CIA agent and writer, heart failure.
- Charlie Shoemaker, 50, American baseball player (Kansas City Athletics), suicide by gunshot.
- Willy Spühler, 88, Swiss politician.

== Sources ==
- Liebman, Roy (2000). The Wampas Baby Stars: A Biographical Dictionary, 1922–1934. Jefferson, North Carolina: McFarland. ISBN 0-7864-0756-5.
