= 1990 in baseball =

The following are the baseball events of the year 1990 throughout the world.

== Champions ==
=== Major League Baseball ===
- World Series: Cincinnati Reds over Oakland Athletics (4-0); José Rijo, MVP

League Championship Series (ALCS, NLCS)
East	Boston	0
West	Oakland	4
East	Pittsburgh	2
West	Cincinnati	4

World Series
AL	Oakland	0
NL	Cincinnati	4

- American League Championship Series MVP Dave Stewart
- National League Championship Series co-MVPs: Rob Dibble and Randy Myers
- All-Star Game, July 10 at Wrigley Field: American League, 2–0; Julio Franco, MVP

=== Other champions ===
- Baseball World Cup: Cuba
- Caribbean World Series: Leones del Escogido (Dominican Republic)
- College World Series: Georgia
- Japan Series: Seibu Lions defeated the Yomiuri Giants (4–0)
- Korean Series: LG Twins over Samsung Lions
- Big League World Series: Taipei, Taiwan
- Junior League World Series: Yabucoa, Puerto Rico
- Little League World Series: San-Hua, Tainan County, Taiwan
- Senior League World Series: Taipei, Taiwan
- Taiwan Series: Wei Chuan Dragons defeated the Mercuries Tigers

== Awards and honors ==
- Baseball Hall of Fame
  - Joe Morgan
  - Jim Palmer
- Most Valuable Player
  - Rickey Henderson, Oakland Athletics (AL)
  - Barry Bonds, Pittsburgh Pirates (NL)
- Cy Young Award
  - Bob Welch, Oakland Athletics (AL)
  - Doug Drabek, Pittsburgh Pirates (NL)
- Rookie of the Year
  - Sandy Alomar Jr., Cleveland Indians (AL)
  - David Justice, Atlanta Braves (NL)
- Manager of the Year Award
  - Jeff Torborg, Chicago White Sox (AL)
  - Jim Leyland, Pittsburgh Pirates (NL)
- Woman Executive of the Year (major or minor league): Leanne Pagliai, Riverside Red Wave, California League
- Gold Glove Award
  - Mark McGwire (1B) (AL)
  - Harold Reynolds (2B) (AL)
  - Kelly Gruber (3B) (AL)
  - Ozzie Guillén (SS) (AL)
  - Ellis Burks (OF) (AL)
  - Ken Griffey Jr. (OF) (AL)
  - Gary Pettis (OF) (AL)
  - Sandy Alomar Jr. (C) (AL)
  - Mike Boddicker (P) (AL)
  - Andrés Galarraga (1B) (NL)
  - Ryne Sandberg (2B) (NL)
  - Tim Wallach (3B) (NL)
  - Ozzie Smith (SS) (NL)
  - Barry Bonds (OF) (NL)
  - Tony Gwynn (OF) (NL)
  - Andy Van Slyke (OF) (NL)
  - Benito Santiago (C) (NL)
  - Greg Maddux (P) (NL)

== MLB statistical leaders ==
	American League		National League
Type	Name	Stat	Name	Stat
AVG	George Brett KC	.329	Willie McGee STL	.335
HR	Cecil Fielder DET	51	Ryne Sandberg CHC	40
RBI	Cecil Fielder DET	132	Matt Williams SF	122
Wins	Bob Welch OAK	27	Doug Drabek PIT	22
ERA	Roger Clemens BOS	1.93	Danny Darwin HOU	2.21
Ks	Nolan Ryan TEX	232	David Cone NYM	233

== Major League Baseball final standings ==
American League

AL East
Team	W	L	Pct.	GB	Home	Road
Boston Red Sox	88	74	.543	—	51‍–‍30	37‍–‍44
Toronto Blue Jays	86	76	.531	2	44‍–‍37	42‍–‍39
Detroit Tigers	79	83	.488	9	39‍–‍42	40‍–‍41
Cleveland Indians	77	85	.475	11	41‍–‍40	36‍–‍45
Baltimore Orioles	76	85	.472	11½	40‍–‍40	36‍–‍45
Milwaukee Brewers	74	88	.457	14	39‍–‍42	35‍–‍46
New York Yankees	67	95	.414	21	37‍–‍44	30‍–‍51

AL West
Team	W	L	Pct.	GB	Home	Road
Oakland Athletics	103	59	.636	—	51‍–‍30	52‍–‍29
Chicago White Sox	94	68	.580	9	49‍–‍31	45‍–‍37
Texas Rangers	83	79	.512	20	47‍–‍35	36‍–‍44
California Angels	80	82	.494	23	42‍–‍39	38‍–‍43
Seattle Mariners	77	85	.475	26	38‍–‍43	39‍–‍42
Kansas City Royals	75	86	.466	27½	45‍–‍36	30‍–‍50
Minnesota Twins	74	88	.457	29	41‍–‍40	33‍–‍48

National League

NL East
Team	W	L	Pct.	GB	Home	Road
Pittsburgh Pirates	95	67	.586	—	49‍–‍32	46‍–‍35
New York Mets	91	71	.562	4	52‍–‍29	39‍–‍42
Montreal Expos	85	77	.525	10	47‍–‍34	38‍–‍43
Chicago Cubs	77	85	.475	18	39‍–‍42	38‍–‍43
Philadelphia Phillies	77	85	.475	18	41‍–‍40	36‍–‍45
St. Louis Cardinals	70	92	.432	25	34‍–‍47	36‍–‍45

NL West
Team	W	L	Pct.	GB	Home	Road
Cincinnati Reds	91	71	.562	—	46‍–‍35	45‍–‍36
Los Angeles Dodgers	86	76	.531	5	47‍–‍34	39‍–‍42
San Francisco Giants	85	77	.525	6	49‍–‍32	36‍–‍45
Houston Astros	75	87	.463	16	49‍–‍32	26‍–‍55
San Diego Padres	75	87	.463	16	37‍–‍44	38‍–‍43
Atlanta Braves	65	97	.401	26	37‍–‍44	28‍–‍53

== Managers ==
=== American League ===
Team	Manager	Comments
Baltimore Orioles	Frank Robinson	
Boston Red Sox	Joe Morgan	Won AL East title
California Angels	Doug Rader	Second season as Angels manager
Chicago White Sox	Jeff Torborg	AL Manager of the Year
Cleveland Indians	John McNamara	First season as Indians manager
Detroit Tigers	Sparky Anderson	12th season as Tigers manager
Kansas City Royals	John Wathan	
Milwaukee Brewers	Tom Trebelhorn	
Minnesota Twins	Tom Kelly	
New York Yankees	Bucky Dent	Replaced during the season by Stump Merrill
Oakland Athletics	Tony La Russa	Won AL Pennant
Seattle Mariners	Jim Lefebvre	
Texas Rangers	Bobby Valentine	
Toronto Blue Jays	Cito Gaston	

=== National League ===
Team	Manager	Comments
Atlanta Braves	Russ Nixon	Replaced during the season by Bobby Cox
Chicago Cubs	Don Zimmer	
Cincinnati Reds	Lou Piniella	Won the World Series
Houston Astros	Art Howe	2nd season with the Astros
Los Angeles Dodgers	Tommy Lasorda	
Montreal Expos	Buck Rodgers	
New York Mets	Davey Johnson	Replaced during the season by Bud Harrelson
Philadelphia Phillies	Nick Leyva	
Pittsburgh Pirates	Jim Leyland	NL East Division title
St. Louis Cardinals	Whitey Herzog	Replaced during the season by Joe Torre
San Diego Padres	Jack McKeon	Replaced during the season by Greg Riddoch
San Francisco Giants	Roger Craig	6th season with the Giants

== Events ==
=== January ===
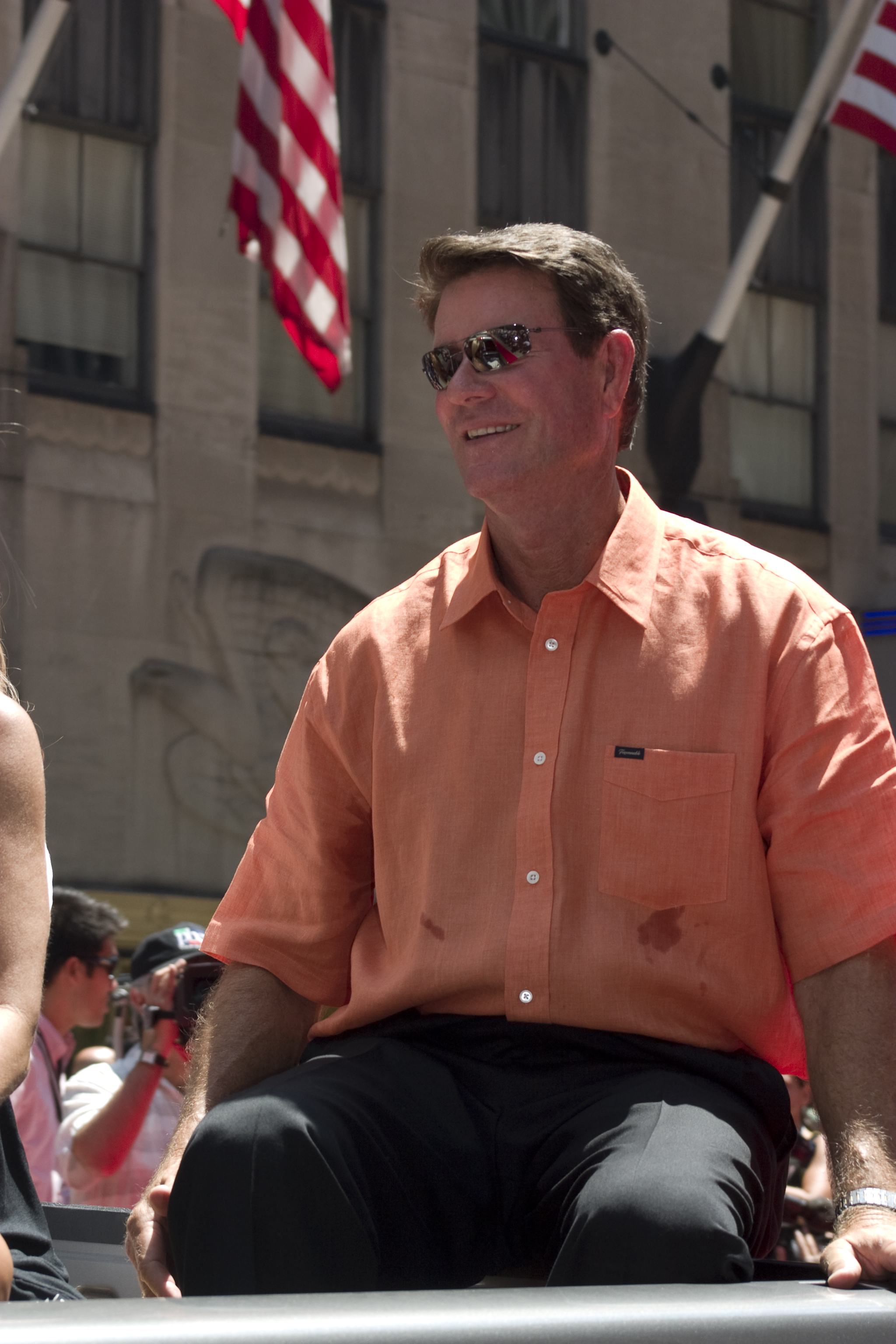
Jim Palmer in 2008

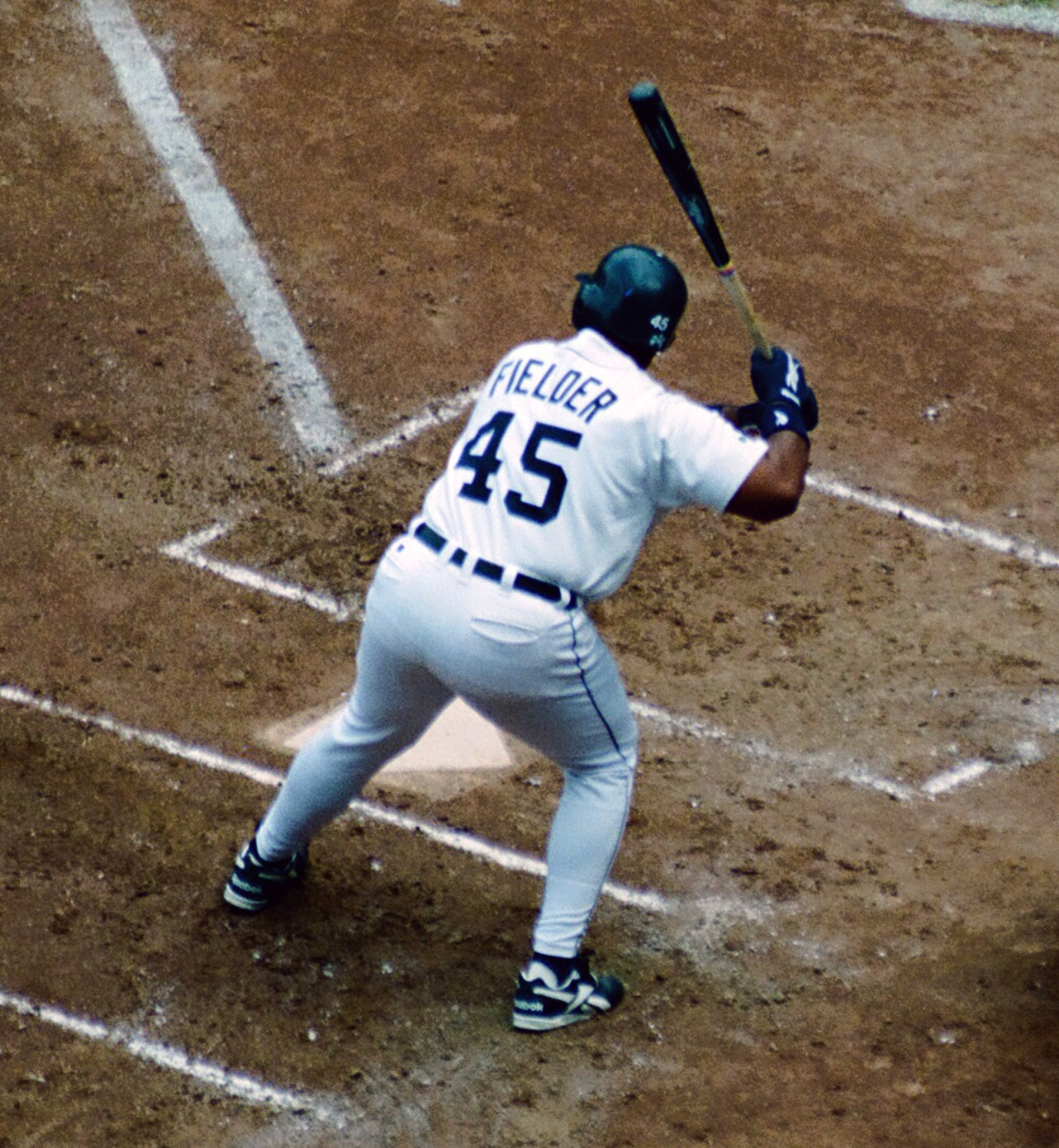
Cecil Fielder batting in 1996

- January 2 – The Chicago Cubs release veteran third baseman Vance Law; he'll sign with the Chunichi Dragons of Nippon Professional Baseball, where at age 33 he hits .313 with 29 home runs in 122 games played this coming season.
- January 3 – The Cubs and Texas Rangers make two separate transactions. In one, Chicago obtains 22-year-old shortstop prospect Rey Sánchez from the Rangers for Triple-A infielder Bryan House. In the second, the Cubs reacquire relief pitcher Dave Pavlas from Texas in a cash transaction.
- January 8 – The Detroit Tigers dip into the ranks of college football and appoint Bo Schembechler, legendary and recently retired head coach of the Michigan Wolverines, as their new club president. Schembechler, 60, succeeds longtime Tiger executive Jim Campbell.
- January 9 – Jim Palmer, a three-time American League Cy Young Award winner, and Joe Morgan, a two-time National League MVP, are elected to the Hall of Fame by the Baseball Writers' Association of America in their first year of eligibility. Palmer is named on 92.6% of ballots, Morgan on 81.8%; at 72.1%, Gaylord Perry falls just short of the 75% threshold.
- January 10 – Major League Baseball owners propose revenue sharing and a pay-for-performance plan as cornerstones of a new collective bargaining agreement with the MLBPA, and set a February 9 deadline for the players' union to accept their offer, setting the stage for a lockout that would threaten the opening of spring training.
- January 15 – The Detroit Tigers sign designated hitter Cecil Fielder as a free agent. Fielder, 26, spent all or part of four seasons (1985–1988) with the Toronto Blue Jays and returns to North America after slugging 38 homers and hitting .302 for the 1989 Hanshin Tigers of the Japan Central League. This coming season, he will become the first American Leaguer to exceed the 50-home-run mark since Roger Maris and Mickey Mantle in 1961.
- January 16 – No fewer than 157 MLB players—a new daily record—file for salary arbitration, seeking higher pay from their current employers.
- January 19 – Future Hall of Famer Gary Carter, 35, signs a free-agent contract with the San Francisco Giants. Carter, a two-time All-Star Game MVP and 1986 World Series champion, is 37 games short of the NL record for most career games played as a catcher. He had been unconditionally released by the New York Mets last November 14.
- January 28 – The San Francisco Giants sign record-setting veteran relief pitcher Dan Quisenberry as a free agent. He'd been released by the St. Louis Cardinals last October 11.
- January 31 – The Pittsburgh Pirates sign infielder Wally Backman, granted free agency from the Minnesota Twins last November 13 as part of the "Class of 1989."

=== February ===
- February 3 – Charles Bronfman, principal owner of the Montreal Expos since their founding in 1968, puts Canada's first-ever MLB franchise on the market. The sale process will last over a year before a suitable buyer is found.
- February 13 – In an attempt to turbocharge stalled labor negotiations, Commissioner of Baseball Fay Vincent advocates setting aside the owners' "revenue participation" proposal in favor of a "more traditional" approach that focuses on issues such as minimum salary and arbitration eligibility—and effectively torpedoes his bosses' attempt to put into place a salary cap.
- February 15:
  - A thirty-two-day lockout begins, as MLB owners refuse to open spring training without reaching a new collective bargaining agreement with the players' union.
  - After appearing in 244 games with the California Angels and Kansas City Royals since being released by the Boston Red Sox on July 23, 1987, first baseman Bill Buckner, now 40, returns to the Bosox as a free agent. Buckner drove in 102 runs for the 1986 Red Sox, but his error in Game 6 of the World Series has become one of the most infamous moments in Fall Classic annals.
- February 17 – The New York Yankees sign 20-year-old Panamanian amateur free-agent pitcher Mariano Rivera.
- February 27 – The St. Louis Cardinals obtain 22-year-old right-hander Omar Olivares from the San Diego Padres for relief pitcher Steve Peters and outfielder Alex Cole.

=== March ===
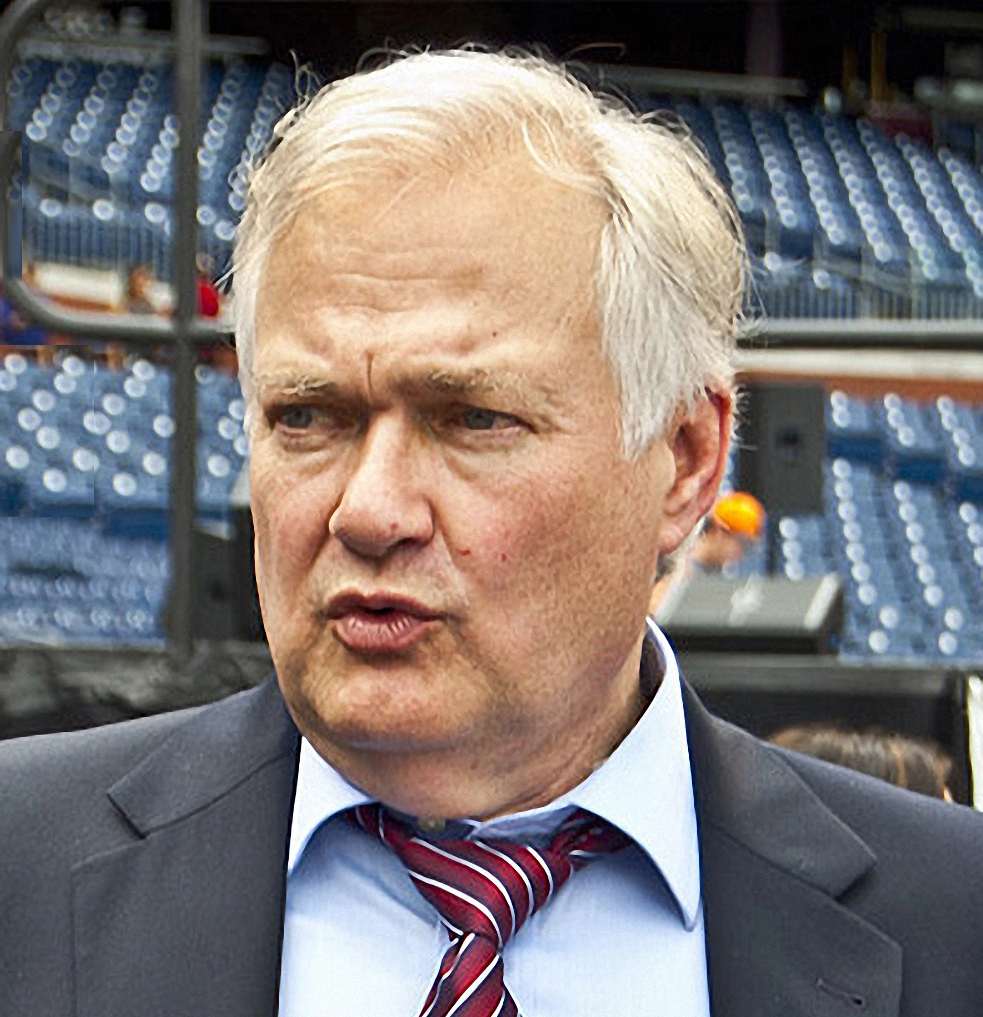
Donald Fehr

Dave Winfield

- March 3 – The $110 million "Florida Suncoast Dome," built expressly for baseball to lure an expansion team or relocated franchise, opens in St. Petersburg. Although it nearly induces the San Francisco Giants to move after the 1992 season, the domed facility, ultimately renamed Tropicana Field, will have to wait eight years until the expansion Tampa Bay Devil Rays become its first baseball tenant in 1998.
- March 13 – The Houston Astros acquire Orlando Miller from the New York Yankees for fellow shortstop prospect Dave Silvestri and a player to be named later, minor-league hurler Daven Bond.
- March 19:
  - Commissioner Fay Vincent announces a new, four-year collective bargaining agreement with the Major League Baseball Players Association, through 1993, known as CBA–7, ending the 32-day 1990 lockout, the second-longest work stoppage to date in MLB history.
    - The agreement raises the minimum salary to $100,000 from $68,000, and increases the owners' contribution to the pension/benefit plan to an average of $55 million over the four years.
    - What had been the key sticking point—salary arbitration eligibility—remains three years, but the top 17% of two-year players by service time will become arbitration-eligible. Soon known as "Super 2", this designation is expected to affect 15–17 players per year. Either side may reopen the CBA after three years.
    - Spring training opens immediately and Opening Day of the regular season, initially scheduled for April 2, will be delayed to April 9. The 162-game schedule is preserved by extending closing day to October 3.
    - Vincent's intervention in the negotiations—which included scuttling the owners' attempt to impose a salary cap and at least one private, one-on-one session with union boss Donald Fehr—will be a major cause of his removal as Commissioner in September 1992.
  - The Atlanta Braves purchase the contract of Vinny Castilla, 22 and currently a shortstop, from Saltillo of the Mexican League. By 1995, Castilla will become a two-time National League All-Star as the slugging third baseman of the Colorado Rockies, racking up three consecutive 40-plus homer seasons, and the most prolific homer-hitter of Mexican birth in MLB annals.
- March 21 – Former 20-game winner and NL All-Star Mike Krukow, granted free agency from the San Francisco Giants last November 13, retires due to a chronic shoulder injury. Krukow, 38, won 124 games over 14 MLB seasons, the last seven as a Giant; in 1990, he'll begin a 37-year-long career as a beloved member of the club's broadcast team.
- March 23 – The FBI arrests Howard Spira, a 31-year-old gambler from the Bronx, after he's indicted by a U.S. grand jury for allegedly extorting money from New York Yankees principal owner George Steinbrenner. Spira claims Steinbrenner hired him in 1986 to ferret out damaging information about the foundation started by Yankee right-fielder Dave Winfield, with whom the owner was then feuding. Steinbrenner admits making a $40,000 payment to Spira two months ago. MLB reveals that it has launched an independent investigation into Steinbrenner's actions.
- March 26 – Hoping to replicate the impact of two-sport stars Bo Jackson of the Kansas City Royals and Deion Sanders, currently with the Yankees, the New York Mets sign Minnesota Vikings running back D. J. Dozier, 24, as an amateur free agent. Dozier, an outfielder, has a strong rookie minor-league campaign in 1990 (.303/.386/.496, with 127 hits and 15 homers in 122 games played), but he'll ultimately appear in only 25 MLB games for the 1992 Mets.
- March 31 – The Philadelphia Phillies acquire right-hander José DeJesús from the Royals for shortstop Steve Jeltz.

=== April ===
- April 1 – The Los Angeles Dodgers trade outfielder/first baseman and former (1992) top draft choice Franklin Stubbs to the Houston Astros for rookie southpaw relief pitcher Terry Wells. Stubbs, 29, has hit only .227 in 542 career games for Los Angeles, but he'll enjoy his best overall MLB season in 1990 for Houston before hitting the free agent market in November.
- April 2:
  - Joan Kroc agrees to sell the San Diego Padres to a group headed by entertainment industry mogul Tom Werner for a reported $75 million. Her late husband, Ray, saved the Padres for San Diego when he bought them for $12 million in January 1974.
  - In the wake of the lockout, owners and the MLBPA approve increasing early-season rosters to 27 men between Opening Day and April 30, before squads must be trimmed to a maximum of 25 players.
  - The Montreal Expos trade shortstop Jeff Huson to the Texas Rangers for pitcher Drew Hall.
  - The Detroit Tigers obtain left-hander Jerry Don Gleaton from the Kansas City Royals for minor-league pitcher Chuck Everson. Gleaton, 32 and a ten-year veteran, will save 13 games coming out of the Tiger bullpen this coming season.
- April 3 – The Cincinnati Reds acquire outfielder Billy Hatcher from the Pittsburgh Pirates for right-hander Mike Roesler and shortstop Jeff Richardson. Hatcher, a 29-year-old, seven-year veteran, will be the batting star (nine-for-14, with an OPS of 2.050 and six runs scored) in the Reds' sweep of the 1990 World Series.
- April 4:
  - The Minnesota Twins trade minor-league pitcher Mike Pomeranz to the Pirates for veteran catcher Junior Ortiz and infielder Orlando Lind.
  - The 21-year MLB career of Darrell Evans ends when the 42-year-old third baseman, author of 414 homers, is unconditionally released by the Atlanta Braves.
- April 7:
  - The Boston Red Sox sign pitcher Jeff Gray, released by the Philadelphia Phillies on March 30.
  - The Twins sign 36-year-old reliever Terry Leach, released by the Kansas City Royals five days ago.
- April 8:
  - The Detroit Tigers sign catcher Mark Salas, released by the Cleveland Indians last December 1.
  - The San Francisco Giants sign outfielder Rick Leach, granted free agency from the Atlanta Braves four days ago.

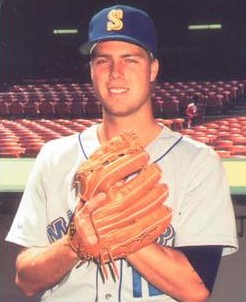
Mark Langston in 1987

- April 9:
  - Because of the recent lockout, the 1990 MLB season opens a week later than originally planned, with five games in the American League and four in the National.
    - ESPN kicks off its regular-season game coverage with an Opening Day "tripleheader," telecasting contests from Kansas City, San Diego and Arlington, Texas. ESPN Sunday Night Baseball will debut on April 15, with Jon Miller and Joe Morgan at the microphone. The cable sports behemoth signed a four-year, $400 million contract with MLB last season for national cable rights.
    - Just after 1 p.m. Eastern time, the ceremony before the season's first contest, at Fenway Park, sees Boston fans give Bill Buckner a standing ovation when he's introduced with the Red Sox' Opening Day squad. Buckner—driven out of town in 1987 by fallout from his crucial error in Game 6 of the 1986 World Series—won a spot as a part-time player on the Bosox' roster this season, his 22nd in the major leagues. A month after hitting an inside-the-park home run at Fenway on April 25, he'll make his final MLB appearance on May 30 before retiring.
    - After hosting the traditional NL opener since 1939, the Cincinnati Reds begin their season on the road against the Houston Astros and triumph, 8–4, in 11 innings. Manager Lou Piniella is victorious in his first National League game. Houston's Glenn Davis is hit by a pitch three times, tying a record.
  - New York Yankees first baseman Don Mattingly becomes 1990's highest-paid player, signing a five-year contract extension for an average annual salary of $3.8 million, to surpass Will Clark ($3.75 million AAV) of the San Francisco Giants.
- April 10 – In an unprecedented twist on the old tradition of "Presidential Openers," which ceased two decades ago, George H. W. Bush throws out a first pitch at an Opening Day. But the game itself is in a foreign country, Canada. At SkyDome, Bush and Canada's prime minister, Brian Mulroney, hurl simultaneous first pitches in unison to celebrate the Toronto Blue Jays' home opener before 49,673 fans. The two national leaders, in the midst of a series of official meetings, stay for five innings in what will be the Blue Jays' 2–1 victory over the Texas Rangers.
  - The visiting Rangers are owned by Bush's son George W., who will eventually become governor of Texas and then 43rd president of the United States.
- April 11:
  - At Anaheim Stadium, in his first start as a marquee free agent, southpaw Mark Langston of the California Angels combines with Mike Witt to throw a no-hitter against Langston's original team, the Seattle Mariners, 1–0. Langston goes seven innings; he walks four and fans three. The combined no-hitter is the first in the majors since July 28, 1976.
  - Games scheduled to be played in Milwaukee, Chicago and Cleveland are snowed out.
- April 14:
  - For the first time in MLB history, two reigning Cy Young Award winners contribute to one club's victory. The 1989 American League "Cy," Bret Saberhagen, gets the win, while the NL's 1989 CYA winner, relief pitcher Mark Davis, picks up the save in the Kansas City Royals' 3–1 triumph over the visiting Toronto Blue Jays. Davis switched leagues when he signed with the Royals as a free agent last December 11.
  - CBS officially assumes the role as Major League Baseball's over-the-air broadcast partner (succeeding both ABC and NBC under a $1.1 billion, four-year deal through the end of the 1993 season) with coverage of the Chicago Cubs at Pittsburgh and Los Angeles at Houston. Jack Buck and Tim McCarver form CBS' top announcing team, with Buck replacing the recently fired Brent Musburger in the play-by-play role.
  - The San Francisco Giants sign outfielder Mike Kingery, granted free agency from the Seattle Mariners on April 6.
- April 20:
  - Pete Rose pleads guilty to two charges of filing false income tax returns not showing income he receives from selling autographs, memorabilia, and from horse racing winnings.
  - After retiring the first 26 Oakland Athletics batters, Brian Holman loses a perfect game when Ken Phelps hits a home run in an eventual 6–1 Seattle Mariners win.
- April 21 – The Cincinnati Reds win their franchise-record ninth consecutive game of the new season, defeating the Atlanta Braves at Riverfront Stadium, 8–1. The Reds' resurgence is keyed by the relief work of the "Nasty Boys"—southpaws Norm Charlton and Randy Myers and righty Rob Dibble—who so far have fanned 36 in 18 combined innings of work and allowed four earned runs. Barry Larkin is hitting .564 with 22 hits to pace the offense, and skipper Lou Piniella is saluted by owner Marge Schott for getting the Reds to "play as a team."
- April 23 – During an in-season exhibition game against the cross-town rival Chicago Cubs, Steve Lyons of the White Sox plays all nine positions.
- April 26 – Nolan Ryan pitches a one-hitter and sets a Texas Rangers record with 16 strikeouts in a 1–0 win over the Chicago White Sox. It is also the 12th career one-hitter for Ryan, which ties him with all-time leader Bob Feller, and records his 200th career game with at least ten strikeouts. Ron Kittle has the only hit for Chicago, a single.
- April 27:
  - Wally Backman of the Pittsburgh Pirates goes six-for-six, collecting five singles and a double, in the Bucs' 9–4 triumph over the San Diego Padres at Jack Murphy Stadium.
  - Two days after being treated roughly by the St. Louis Cardinals in his fourth start of the season, 1988 NL Cy Young Award winner and World Series MVP Orel Hershiser of the Los Angeles Dodgers undergoes season-ending shoulder surgery, performed by Frank Jobe. His next appearance on the Dodger mound will come in 13 months, on May 29, 1991.
  - The Milwaukee Brewers release first baseman and pinch hitter Terry Francona, ending his injury-plagued MLB playing career at age 31. After finishing 1990 with Louisville of the American Association, Francona will begin his career as a manager in 1992 with the South Bend White Sox of the Class A Midwest League.
- April 29:
  - The New York Yankees reacquire Claudell Washington from the California Angels for fellow left-handed-hitting outfielder Luis Polonia. Washington, now 35 and in his 17th MLB season, played for the Bombers between July 1, 1986 and 1988.
  - Opting to not be placed on the disabled list, Dan Quisenberry announces his retirement after only five appearances for the San Francisco Giants. The 37-year-old former relief ace retires with 244 career saves and led the AL five times in that category.
  - In the heart of "football country," two Texas League teams put up a score fit for a gridiron contest when the host Midland Angels fall to the visiting Wichita Wranglers, 33–17. Wichita bats around four times. The 50 runs are the most scored in the minor leagues in seven years.
- April 30:
  - In the fourth inning of a game between the visiting New York Mets and Atlanta Braves, the Braves' Mark Lemke tops a slow grounder that's fielded by Mets infielder Gregg Jeffries, who tosses the ball to pitcher David Cone, covering first base. When Lemke is ruled safe by umpire Charlie Williams, Cone has a meltdown on the field, and during his heated argument with Williams, two Braves runners score. The Mets go on to lose, 7–4.
    - The faltering Mets, now 9–10, obtain centerfielder Daryl Boston from the Chicago White Sox on waivers.
  - The Cleveland Indians obtain right-hander Sergio Valdez from the Atlanta Braves on waivers.
  - Chicago's rival clubs make an interleague deal, with the White Sox sending relief pitcher Bill Long to the Cubs for minor-league hurler Frank Campos.

=== May ===
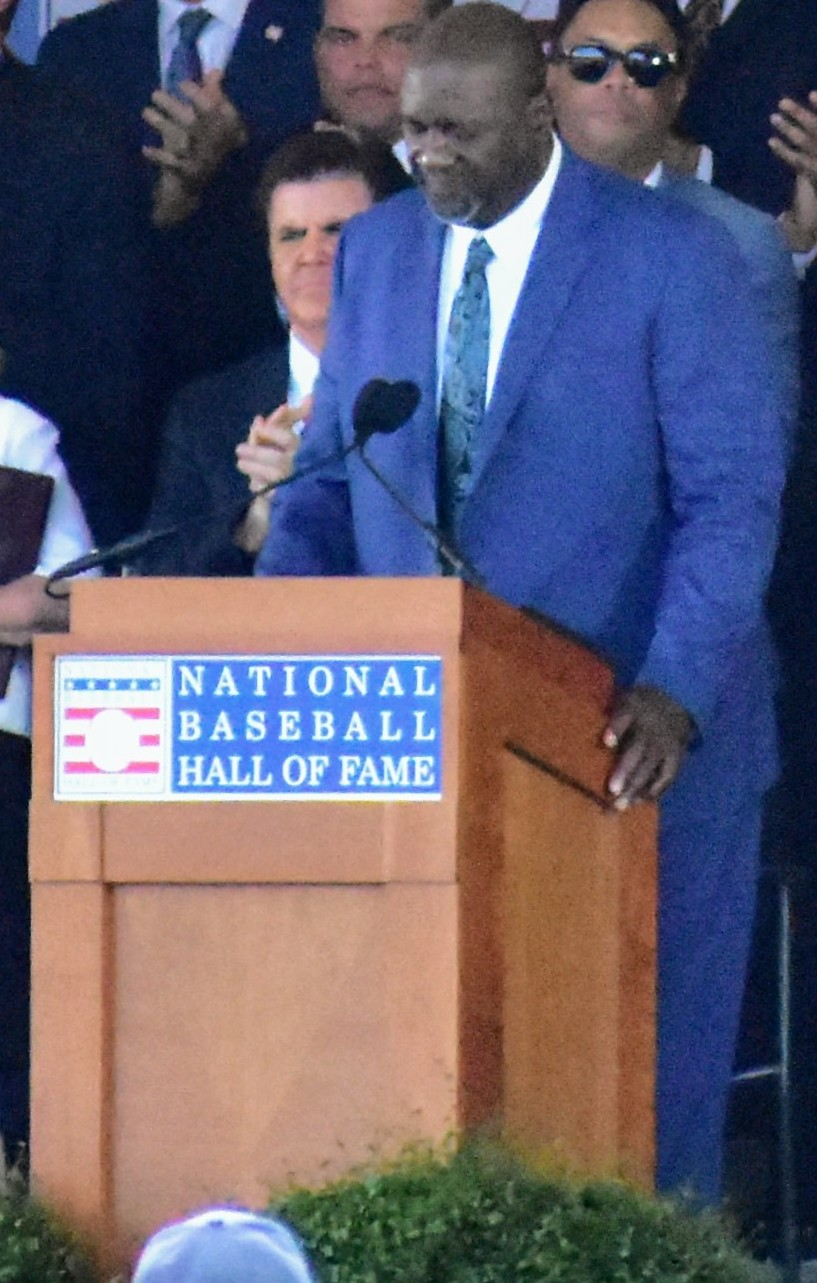
Lee Smith

- May 2 – National League umpire Bob Engel is charged with shoplifting seven boxes and 50 packs of baseball cards from two Bakersfield, California, stores earlier this year. During his 26 years as an NL arbiter, Engel, 56, has worked in 3,630 regular-season games, six NLCS matchups, three World Series, and four MLB All-Star Games, most recently last season's; he's also former president of the MLB umpires' union. Suspended indefinitely April 24, he will plead "no contest" to the misdemeanor in July and immediately retire from baseball.
- May 3 – Rookie third baseman Mike Blowers of the New York Yankees commits four errors, all after the sixth inning, that lead to seven unearned runs and enable the visiting Cleveland Indians to erase a 5–1 deficit and blow past the Yankees, 10–5. Blowers will go on to have a solid, 11-year MLB career, primarily with the Seattle Mariners, and lead American League third basemen in range factor and fielding percentage in 1993.
- May 4 – The Boston Red Sox trade future Hall-of-Fame closer Lee Smith to the St. Louis Cardinals in exchange for outfielder Tom Brunansky. Smith, 32, remains in the prime of his career: he will lead the NL in saves in 1991 and 1992, then the AL in 1994.
- May 11 – Dave Winfield's tumultuous decade with the New York Yankees ends in chaos, when the future Hall of Famer refuses to accept a trade to the California Angels for pitcher Mike Witt. Winfield, 38, rejects the transaction as a ten-year veteran who has spent five straight years with the same team.
  - Since joining the Yankees in 1981, Winfield has collected 1,300 hits, slugged 205 homers, won four Gold Glove Awards, and made eight AL All-Star teams. But he's been scapegoated by George Steinbrenner for the Bombers' World Series drought, currently 11 years and counting, resulting in a prolonged feud between owner and player, and a Winfield lawsuit settled only last September. After back surgery cost him the entire 1989 season, Winfield is hitting only .213 in 20 games so far in 1990.
  - On May 16, Winfield will rescind his protest and join the Angels, signing a three-year contract extension.
- May 22 – In their 16-inning, 2–1 victory at Wrigley Field, André Dawson of the Chicago Cubs—the reigning NL "Player of the Week"—is intentionally walked by the Cincinnati Reds five times, becoming the first hitter to collect five free passes in an MLB game.
- May 26 – The Philadelphia Phillies retire the #20 uniform of eventual Baseball Hall of Famer Mike Schmidt.
- May 29 – When Oakland Athletics outfielder Rickey Henderson swipes third base in the sixth inning of a game against the Toronto Blue Jays, Henderson passes Ty Cobb for most stolen bases in American League history.

=== June ===
- June 2 – At the Kingdome, Randy Johnson of the Seattle Mariners no-hits the Detroit Tigers 2-0. The no-hitter is the first in both Mariner and Kingdome history.
- June 6 – The highest-profile managerial firing of the 1990 season happens when the New York Yankees fire Bucky Dent before a game against their rivals at Fenway Park, where he hit his famous three-run home run in a one-game playoff game in 1978, making Fenway Park the scene of his greatest moment as a player and worst moment as manager. Prior to the game, Yankees broadcaster Tony Kubek blasts owner George Steinbrenner before a television audience, saying the firing of Dent was "mishandled" and calling Steinbrenner a "loser", "bully", and a "coward".
- June 11 – Nolan Ryan pitches the sixth no hitter of his career by defeating the Oakland Athletics in Oakland, 5-0.
- June 12 – The Pittsburgh Pirates' Sid Bream and Kansas City Royals' Bill Pecota each went 4-for-4, but neither one scored or drove in a run.
- June 14 – It is announced that the National League expands by two teams for the 1993 season.
- June 22 – The Atlanta Braves fire manager Russ Nixon and replace him with general manager Bobby Cox.
- June 29 – For the first time in major league history, two no-hitters are thrown on the same day in both leagues. Dave Stewart for the Oakland Athletics, no-hits his future team, the Toronto Blue Jays, at SkyDome. Hours later, Dodger pitcher Fernando Valenzuela no-hit the St. Louis Cardinals at Dodger Stadium.

=== July ===
- July 1 – While no longer recognized as such, the New York Yankees' Andy Hawkins pitches a no-hitter at old Comiskey Park. However, walks and errors lead to four unearned runs as the Chicago White Sox win 4-0. Hawkins pitches for the visiting team, and pitches only 8 innings since there is no bottom of the 9th.
- July 5 – Whitey Herzog quits in his eleventh year as manager of the St. Louis Cardinals. He has a 1,281-1,125 (.532) record in 18 years as a manager, including stints with the Texas Rangers, California Angels and Kansas City Royals..
- July 10 – Six American League pitchers combine for a two-hitter and a 2–0 victory over the National League in a rain-delayed All-Star Game at Wrigley Field. Texas Rangers second baseman Julio Franco drives in both runs in the 7th inning and is named MVP.
- July 12:
  - Barry Bonds hits his 100th career home run.
  - Mélido Pérez of the Chicago White Sox no-hits the New York Yankees at Yankee Stadium 8-0. However, the game is called after six innings by rain. Perez's no-hitter avenges Andy Hawkins no-no back on July 1; coincidentally, Hawkins is the losing pitcher for New York in Perez's game.
- July 17 – The Minnesota Twins turn two triple plays in a single game – the first time that's been accomplished in the major leagues – against the Boston Red Sox, yet still lose the game 1–0 on an unearned run. The following night, the two clubs tie a major league record by turning a combined ten double plays in their game, another Boston victory. Boston ties an American League record by grounding into six double plays in the nine-inning game.
- July 19 – Pete Rose is sentenced to five months in the medium security Prison Camp at the United States Penitentiary in Marion, Illinois and fined $50,000 following his April 20 guilty plea to two charges of filing false income tax returns not showing income he receives from selling autographs, memorabilia, and from horse racing winnings.
- July 28 – The Cleveland Indians retire longtime coach and former player Mel Harder's number 18.
- July 31 – Nolan Ryan of the Texas Rangers earns his 300th career win, against the Milwaukee Brewers.

=== August ===
- August 3 – Against the Philadelphia Phillies at Veterans Stadium, Doug Drabek of the Pittsburgh Pirates has a no-hitter broken up with two out in the ninth. Sil Campusano, who had not even been in the starting lineup, breaks up the bid with a single to right; the hit is the only one Drabek will allow in the Pirates' 11-0 victory. The no-hitter would have been the Pirates' first since John Candelaria in 1976.
- August 15 – At Veterans Stadium, Terry Mulholland of the Philadelphia Phillies no-hits the San Francisco Giants 6-0.
- August 21 – At Dodger Stadium, the Philadelphia Phillies overcome a 10-run deficit to defeat the Los Angeles Dodgers 12-11. After the Dodgers score eight runs in the fifth inning to take an 11-1 lead, the Phillies score twice in the eighth, then five more runs in the ninth before John Kruk ties the game with a three-run home run; a double by Carmelo Martínez scores Rod Booker to complete the comeback.
- August 25 – In the fourth inning of a 14-4 victory over the Oakland Athletics at Tiger Stadium, Cecil Fielder of the Detroit Tigers, batting against Dave Stewart, hits a home run that clears the left-field roof. The home run is the third overall, and the first by a Tiger, to clear the left-field roof. Harmon Killebrew hits a home run over the roof in 1962 and Frank Howard in 1968.
- August 27 – At Cleveland Stadium, Boston Red Sox outfielder Ellis Burks hit two home runs in an eight-run 4th inning of a 12–4 victory over the Indians. It is only the second time a Red Sox hitter homers twice in an inning. Bill Regan is the first, on June 16, 1928.
- August 31 – Ken Griffey and his son Ken Griffey Jr. start for the Seattle Mariners in a game against the Kansas City Royals. It marks the first time a father and son ever play in the same Major League game.

=== September ===
- September 2 – After coming close on numerous occasions, Dave Stieb of the Toronto Blue Jays hurls his team's first (and so far only) no-hitter, blanking the Cleveland Indians 3–0 at Cleveland Stadium.
- September 3 – Reliever Bobby Thigpen sets a major league season-record with his 47th save of the year in a 4–2 Chicago White Sox victory over the Kansas City Royals. The previous record was set by Dave Righetti of the New York Yankees in the 1986 season.
- September 14 – Ken Griffey and Ken Griffey Jr. hit back-to-back home runs in a 7–5 loss to the California Angels. Pitcher Kirk McCaskill gives up the historic home runs.
- September 15 – Bobby Thigpen of the Chicago White Sox saves his fiftieth game, becoming the first pitcher to reach that mark. The White Sox defeat the Boston Red Sox 7-5.
- September 19 – At Wrigley Field, Barry Bonds of the Pittsburgh Pirates becomes a first-time member of the 30–30 club. Batting in the fifth inning of the Pirates' 8-7 victory over the Chicago Cubs, Bonds, who had stolen his 49th base earlier in the game, hits his 30th home run off Cub pitcher Bill Long. Bonds will go on to tie his father Bobby for most 30 home run/30 stolen base seasons with five.
- September 22 – Andre Dawson of the Chicago Cubs steals his 300th base in an 11–5 loss to the New York Mets, becoming only the second player in major league history with 300 home runs, 300 steals and 2,000 hits; Willie Mays is the first, though they are later joined by Barry Bonds.
- September 29 – While waiting through a rain delay, the Cincinnati Reds watch the Los Angeles Dodgers lose to the San Francisco Giants 4-3, which clinches the National League West Division for the Reds, their first Western Division title since the 1979 season. The Reds are the first National League team to lead their division wire-to-wire since the inception of the 162-game season.
- September 30:
  - Harold Reynolds of the Seattle Mariners grounds out; second baseman Scott Fletcher to first baseman Steve Lyons, giving the Chicago White Sox a 2-1 victory in the final game to ever be played at historic Comiskey Park. Bobby Thigpen is on the mound to earn his 57th save, establishing a Major League record for saves in a season.
  - In St. Louis, Pirates pitcher Doug Drabek threw only 80 pitches as he gave up only 3 hits and retiring the final 13 batters as the Pittsburgh Pirates beat the St. Louis Cardinals 2-0 to clinch their first National League East title since their famed 1979 world championship team.

=== October ===
- October 3: A day for batting champions:
  - George Brett became the first player to win a batting title in three straight decades. Brett went 1-for-1 in a 5-2 Kansas City loss to Cleveland. Brett also won the AL batting titles in 1976 and 1980.
  - Willie McGee became the first player to win a batting title in a league he didn't finish. He was in Oakland when he won the title when Dave Magadan of the New York Mets failed to catch him on the season's final day.
- October 10 – The Oakland Athletics beat the Boston Red Sox 3–1 in Game 4 of the ALCS to sweep the series and win their 3rd consecutive American League pennant. Dave Stewart is named Series MVP. Red Sox pitcher Roger Clemens is ejected in the 2nd inning by plate umpire Terry Cooney for arguing balls and strikes, and infielder Marty Barrett is ejected for throwing objects onto the field.
- October 12 – The Cincinnati Reds beat the Pittsburgh Pirates 2–1 in Game 6 of the NLCS to win their first National League pennant since 1976. Rob Dibble and Randy Myers are named co-MVPs of the Series.
- October 20 – The talk of an Oakland Athletics dynasty is proven premature, as the Cincinnati Reds beat Oakland 2–1 to complete one of the most stunning sweeps in World Series history. Series MVP José Rijo (2–0, 0.59 ERA) retires 20 batters in a row, Randy Myers getting the last two outs to give the Reds their first World Championship since 1976. Not joining the celebration at the end is Eric Davis, who ruptures his kidney diving for a ball during the game and is taken to the hospital. It takes Davis several years to fully recover.

=== November ===
- November 6 – Atlanta Braves outfielder David Justice was named National League Rookie of the Year.
- November 7 – Cleveland Indians catcher Sandy Alomar Jr. was named American League Rookie of the Year.
- November 8 – After 8 up and down years with The New York Mets, Darryl Strawberry signs a 5-year contract with The Los Angeles Dodgers.
- November 19 – Pittsburgh Pirates outfielder Barry Bonds won his first National League MVP.
- November 20 – Oakland Athletics outfielder Rickey Henderson was named American League MVP.
- November 23 – Former Boston Red Sox, Philadelphia Phillies and Cincinnati Reds catcher Baudilio (Bo) Díaz is crushed to death when a rooftop satellite dish topples over at his home in Venezuela. He was 37.

=== December ===
- December 5 – In a blockbuster deal, the Toronto Blue Jays send Tony Fernández and Fred McGriff to the San Diego Padres for Roberto Alomar and Joe Carter.
- December 6 – At Herman Darvick Autograph Auctions in New York City, Shoeless Joe Jackson's signature is sold for $23,100, the most money ever paid for a 19th- or 20th-century signature. Jackson, who did not read or write, copied the signature from one written out by his wife. The signature, which is resold within hours, is cut from a legal document.
- December 18 – The National League announces the six finalist cities for the two expansion clubs that join the league in 1993: Buffalo, Denver, Miami, Orlando, Tampa-St. Petersburg and Washington, D.C.

== Births ==
=== January ===
- January 1 – Xavier Avery
- January 3:
  - Hunter Cervenka
  - Alex Meyer
  - Mike Wright
- January 4 – Raisel Iglesias
- January 5:
  - C. J. Cron
  - José Iglesias
  - Danny Ortiz
- January 11 – Danny Salazar
- January 14 – J. R. Graham
- January 16 – Warwick Saupold
- January 17 – Frank Garcés
- January 18:
  - Anthony Bemboom
  - Brett Lawrie
  - Gift Ngoepe
- January 21:
  - José Ramírez
  - Joe Wieland
- January 22:
  - Jon Berti
  - Mike Hauschild
- January 27 – Tim Beckham
- January 30:
  - Eddy Alvarez
  - C. J. Riefenhauser

=== February ===
- February 1:
  - Nate Orf
  - Stolmy Pimentel
- February 2 – Dan Winkler
- February 8 – Andrew McKirahan
- February 9:
  - Randall Delgado
  - O'Koyea Dickson
  - Henry Rodríguez
- February 10:
  - Tim Hill
  - Allen Webster
- February 13:
  - Nathan Eovaldi
  - Beau Taylor
- February 15 – Michael Roth
- February 18:
  - Joe Colón
  - Didi Gregorius
- February 21 – Brad Goldberg
- February 23 – Jaff Decker
- February 24:
  - Jason Coats
  - Eury De La Rosa
- February 25 – Félix Peña
- February 27:
  - Adam Morgan
  - Carlos Triunfel

=== March ===
- March 1:
  - Kyle Skipworth
  - José Valdez
- March 2 – Wilking Rodríguez
- March 4 – Richard Rodríguez
- March 5 – L. J. Hoes
- March 11 – Ryan Rua
- March 12 – Cole Sulser
- March 13 – Scott Oberg
- March 15 – Nick Ahmed
- March 17:
  - Andrew Kittredge
  - Jean Segura
- March 20 – Brad Hand
- March 22:
  - Brett Marshall
  - Andrew Susac
- March 24 – Starlin Castro
- March 25 – Erisbel Arruebarrena
- March 26 – Jett Bandy
- March 27:
  - Jake Esch
  - Junior Lake
  - Jake Odorizzi
- March 28 – Fernando Cruz

=== April ===
- April 3 – Destin Hood
- April 12:
  - Edgar Olmos
  - Burch Smith
- April 14 – Jacob Barnes
- April 16 – Travis Shaw
- April 17 – Chris O'Grady
- April 18:
  - Henderson Álvarez
  - Anthony DeSclafani
  - Evan Marshall
- April 19:
  - Jackie Bradley Jr.
  - Brian Flynn
- April 20 – Kyle Higashioka
- April 21 – Zack Godley
- April 22:
  - Kevin Kiermaier
  - Colton Murray
- April 23 – Louis Head
- April 26:
  - Johnny Davis
  - Joey Wendle
- April 27 – Aaron Brooks

=== May ===
- May 1:
  - Scooter Gennett
  - A. J. Jiménez
- May 2 – Erasmo Ramírez
- May 6 – Jose Altuve
- May 7 – Keon Broxton
- May 8 – Sean Gilmartin
- May 9 – Jace Peterson
- May 10 – Salvador Pérez
- May 13 – Mychal Givens
- May 20 – Chris Reed
- May 22 – Sam Gaviglio
- May 23:
  - Kyle Barraclough
  - César Hernández
- May 24:
  - Adam Conley
  - Wilmer Font
- May 25:
  - Jarred Cosart
  - Ryan Sherriff
- May 26:
  - Alex Dickerson
  - Paul Sewald
- May 28:
  - Aaron Northcraft
  - Matt Stites
- May 29:
  - Joe Biagini
  - Tyler Pill
  - Trevor Rosenthal
- May 30:
  - John Brebbia
  - Eury Pérez
  - Zack Wheeler

=== June ===
- June 2 – Jake Smith
- June 6:
  - Tyler Collins
  - Anthony Rendon
- June 9 – John Andreoli
- June 12 – Jed Bradley
- June 13 – James McCann
- June 14 – Trent Baker
- June 16 – Kelby Tomlinson
- June 17:
  - Matt Barnes
  - Andrew Chafin
- June 18 – Lisalverto Bonilla
- June 19 – Logan Verrett
- June 22 – Darrell Ceciliani
- June 26:
  - Ray Black
  - Drew Gagnon
- June 27 – Nick Martini
- June 30:
  - Jesús Aguilar
  - Cody Asche

=== July ===
- July 1 – Colin Rea
- July 2 – Jerad Eickhoff
- July 3 – Brandon Maurer
- July 4 – Matt Dermody
- July 5 – Nick Anderson
- July 6 – Preston Tucker
- July 10 – John Lamb
- July 12 – Chasen Shreve
- July 13 – Casey Sadler
- July 14 – Jack Leathersich
- July 15:
  - Sherman Johnson
  - Kyle Kubitza
  - Peter O'Brien
  - Mac Williamson
- July 17 – Matt Purke
- July 19 – Jonathan Pettibone
- July 20 – Tyler Webb
- July 24 – Sebastián Valle
- July 25 – Román Méndez
- July 29 – Jacob Wilson

=== August ===
- August 1:
  - Aledmys Díaz
  - Kennys Vargas
- August 4 – Brian Ellington
- August 5 – Nick Martínez
- August 7:
  - Andy Burns
  - Carter Capps
  - José Domínguez
  - Tony Zych
- August 8 – Webster Rivas
- August 10 – Anthony Gose
- August 11 – Mayckol Guaipe
- August 12 – Ryan Weber
- August 13:
  - Joe Ortiz
  - Hansel Robles
- August 14 – Chris Rowley
- August 15 – Adam Cimber
- August 16 – Adrián Sánchez
- August 17 – Kyle Farmer
- August 18:
  - Yimi García
  - Eric Yardley
- August 21 – Christian Vázquez
- August 22:
  - Alan Busenitz
  - Ryan Carpenter
  - Drew Hutchison
  - Chris Stratton
- August 23 – Mike Yastrzemski
- August 25:
  - Matt Marksberry
  - Deven Marrero
  - Max Muncy
- August 26 – Daniel Corcino
- August 27 – Nick Tropeano
- August 29 – Chris Taylor

=== September ===
- September 3 – Shae Simmons
- September 4 – Chris Beck
- September 6 – Donnie Hart
- September 7 – Dusten Knight
- September 8 – Gerrit Cole
- September 9 – Billy Hamilton
- September 11 – Shawn Armstrong
- September 13 – Steve Hathaway
- September 14:
  - Cody Anderson
  - David Kandilas
  - Derek Law
- September 15 – Parker Markel
- September 17:
  - Brady Rodgers
  - Marcus Semien
- September 18 – Juan Minaya
- September 20 – Ken Giles
- September 24 – Wynton Bernard
- September 26 – Brooks Pounders
- September 27 – Cameron Perkins
- September 28 – Slade Heathcott
- September 30 – Jack Mayfield

=== October ===
- October 6 – Scott Schebler
- October 8 – Robbie Erlin
- October 9 – Jake Lamb
- October 10:
  - Jonathan Aro
  - Shelby Miller
  - Kolten Wong
- October 14 – William Cuevas
- October 16 – Kyle Lloyd
- October 17 – Rafael Montero
- October 19:
  - Jordan Lyles
  - Tyler Matzek
- October 20 – Ty Blach
- October 22 – Drew VerHagen
- October 27:
  - Carlos Pérez
  - Jason Wheeler
- October 28 – Justin Hancock
- October 29:
  - Ender Inciarte
  - Tyler White
- October 30:
  - Joe Panik
  - Patrick Schuster

=== November ===
- November 2:
  - Brian Goodwin
  - Matt Koch
  - Melvin Mercedes
- November 3 – Madison Younginer
- November 5 – Josh Lucas
- November 7 – Danny Santana
- November 11 – Vinny Nittoli
- November 12:
  - Hideto Asamura
  - Marcell Ozuna
- November 13:
  - Luke Bard
  - Chris Devenski
  - Arodys Vizcaíno
- November 14:
  - Sam Selman
  - Yasmany Tomás
- November 17 – Elías Díaz
- November 20 – David Washington
- November 23:
  - Enrique Burgos
  - Jeff Ferrell
- November 28 – Roemon Fields

=== December ===
- December 3:
  - J. T. Chargois
  - Miguel González
  - Matt Reynolds
  - Mike Tauchman
- December 4 – Ángel Nesbitt
- December 7:
  - Steve Baron
  - Brian Johnson
  - Yasiel Puig
- December 9 – Bruce Rondón
- December 10:
  - Wil Myers
  - Austin Wynns
- December 14 – Mike Ohlman
- December 15 – Trevor Hildenberger
- December 17:
  - Taylor Rogers
  - Tyler Rogers
- December 18 – Micah Johnson
- December 19 – Tim Cooney
- December 20 – Bruce Maxwell
- December 21:
  - Mike Clevinger
  - Kendall Graveman
- December 23 – Mitch Haniger
- December 25 – Garrett Cooper
- December 27:
  - Tyler Duffey
  - Brady Feigl
  - Dylan Floro

== Deaths ==
=== January ===
- January 1 – Carmen Hill, 94, pitcher for three National League teams from 1915 through 1930, who won 22 games in 1927 for the league-champion Pittsburgh Pirates.
- January 2 – Bill Beckmann, 82, pitcher who posted a 21–25 record with a 4.79 ERA in 90 games for the Philadelphia Athletics and St. Louis Cardinals from 1939 through 1942.
- January 4:
  - Bobby Balcena, 64, outfielder for the Cincinnati Reds, who during the 1956 season became the first player of Filipino ancestry to appear in a major league game.
  - Bonnie Hollingsworth, 94, pitcher who posted a 4–9 record with a 4.91 ERA in 36 games for the Pittsburgh Pirates, Washington Senators, Brooklyn Robins and Boston Braves from 1922 to 1928.
- January 6 – Walter Anderson, 92, relief pitcher for the Philadelphia Athletics during the 1917 and 1919 seasons.
- January 7:
  - Horace Stoneham, 86, owner of the Giants from 1936 to 1976 who moved the team from New York City to San Francisco for the 1958 season; the team won five NL pennants and the 1954 World Series during his tenure.
  - Shag Thompson, 92, backup outfielder who hit .203 in 48 games for the Philadelphia Athletics from 1914 to 1916.
- January 8 – Fred McDaniel, 76, outfielder for the Negro American League's Kansas City Monarchs (1940) and Memphis Red Sox (1942–1946).
- January 9 – Spud Chandler, 82, All-Star pitcher for the New York Yankees who was the AL's MVP after a 20–4 season in 1943; owned career .717 winning percentage.
- January 13 – Roy Jarvis, 63, catcher who played in 21 games for the Brooklyn Dodgers and Pittsburgh Pirates between 1944 and 1947.
- January 16 – Earl Naylor, 70, backup outfielder for the Philadelphia Phillies (1942–1943) and Brooklyn Dodgers (1946).
- January 23 – Clarence Bruce, 65, second baseman for the 1947–1948 Homestead Grays of the Negro National League.

=== February ===
- February 3 – Erv Kantlehner, 97, pitcher who posted a 13–29 record with a 2.84 in 87 games for the Pittsburgh Pirates and Philadelphia Phillies from 1914 to 1916.
- February 10 – Tony Solaita, 43, only native of American Samoa to play in MLB (as of 2023); hit .255 with 50 home runs and 203 RBI in 525 games for the New York Yankees, Kansas City Royals, California Angels and Montreal Expos between 1968 and 1979.
- February 17 – Larry Cox, 42, backup catcher who hit .221 in 382 games with the Philadelphia Phillies, Seattle Mariners, Chicago Cubs and Texas Rangers (1973–1981); later a minor league manager (1983–1987) and bullpen coach for the Cubs (1988 until his death).
- February 20 – Cecil Garriott, 73, pinch-hitter for the 1946 Chicago Cubs.
- February 24 – Tony Conigliaro, 45, All-Star right fielder for the Boston Red Sox who in 1965, at age 20, became the youngest player ever to win a home run title; hit in the face by a pitch on August 18, 1967, he missed the 1968 season, then made two comebacks from vision problems (1969 and 1975) and hit 62 more home runs during all or parts of four seasons.
- February 27:
  - Vern Freiburger, 66, first baseman in two games for Cleveland Indians in September 1941 at age 17.
  - Jesse "Bill" Williams, 76, All-Star shortstop for the 1940s Kansas City Monarchs who, as a second baseman, was double-play partner of Jackie Robinson's in 1945; batted .471 for champion Monarchs in 1942 Negro World Series.

=== March ===
- March 1 – Creepy Crespi, 72, second baseman for the St. Louis Cardinals during four seasons, including the 1942 World Series champion team.
- March 6 – Joe Sewell, 91, Hall of Fame shortstop for the Cleveland Indians (1920–1930) and New York Yankees (1931–1933) who batted .312 lifetime and struck out only 114 times in more than 8,300 plate appearances; led AL in doubles in 1924, and in putouts and assists four times each; two-time World Series champion (1920, 1932); brother of Luke Sewell and cousin of Rip Sewell.
- March 9 – Lou Vedder, 92, relief pitcher who appeared in one game for the 1920 Detroit Tigers.
- March 11 – Roy Schalk, 81, second baseman for the 1932 New York Yankees and 1944–1945 Chicago White Sox; played in minor leagues for all or part of 20 seasons.
- March 23 – Margaret Holgerson, 63, All-American Girls Professional Baseball League pitcher who posted a 76–69 record and a 1.94 ERA in seven seasons and hurled a postseason no-hitter.
- March 26 – Chet Brewer, 83, All-Star pitcher of the Negro leagues, later a scout for the Pirates.
- March 28 – Johnny Neun, 89, first baseman for the Detroit Tigers and Boston Braves from 1925 to 1931, who in 1927 completed the seventh unassisted triple play in major league history; managed New York Yankees in September 1946 and Cincinnati Reds in 1947–1948, then a longtime scout.
- March 29 – Phil Masi, 74, four-time All-Star catcher who played for the Boston Braves, Pittsburgh Pirates and Chicago White Sox between 1939 and 1952.
- March – Ralph Wyatt, 72, All-Star shortstop of the Chicago American Giants of the Negro American League, 1941 to 1946.

=== April ===
- April 8 – Bill Kelly, 91, first baseman who led the International League in RBI three times (1924–1926) and in home runs twice (1924, 1926); played briefly for the Philadelphia Athletics and Philadelphia Phillies in 1920s, and later managed and umpired in the minors.
- April 12 – Johnny Reder, 80, Polish-born athlete who was a goalkeeper for several American Soccer League teams; in baseball, appeared in 11 games for 1932 Boston Red Sox, mostly as a first baseman, and later named the 1935 New York–Penn League MVP while playing with Williamsport.
- April 18 – John Antonelli, 74, infielder who spent 50 years in baseball; debuted in 1935 as player–manager in minor leagues aged 19; later, appeared in 133 games with wartime St. Louis Cardinals and Philadelphia Phillies (1944–1945), and managed and coached in the minors for the New York Mets' organization through 1985.
- April 21 – Johnny Beazley, 71, who went 21–6 with a 2.13 ERA in his 1942 rookie season for the Cardinals and pitched two complete-game wins in the team's five-game World Series triumph over the Yankees.
- April 29 – Ray Poat, 72, pitcher who posted a 22–30 record with a 4.55 ERA in 116 games for the Cleveland Indians, New York Giants and Pittsburgh Pirates from 1942 through 1949.

=== May ===
- May 4:
  - Luther Clifford, 66, catcher who played in Negro leagues (1948 Homestead Grays) and minor leagues who became a mainstay in Canada's independent/semiprofessional baseball ranks during the 1950s.
  - Jim Schelle, 73, pitcher for the 1939 Philadelphia Athletics.
  - Johnny Wright, 73, All-Star pitcher who won pitching "Triple Crown" of 1943 Negro National League, leading the circuit in wins (18), ERA (2.45), strikeouts (94), games (30) and innings (181) pitched, and complete games (15) as a member of Negro World Series champion Homestead Grays; a contemporary of Jackie Robinson's, he also was signed to a Brooklyn contract in autumn 1945, but pitched only one season (1946) of minor league baseball in Dodger system before returning to the Grays.
- May 14 – Verne Blackbourn, 95, pitcher for the 1921 Chicago White Sox.
- May 16 – Pretzel Pezzullo, 79, relief pitcher who posted a 3–5 record with a 6.36 ERA and one save in 42 games for the Philadelphia Phillies from 1935 to 1936.
- May 23 – Charlie Keller, 73, five-time All-Star and five-time World Series champion as left fielder for the New York Yankees (1939–1943, 1945–1949, 1952) who hit 30 home runs three times.
- May 24:
  - José Del Vecchio, 73, Venezuelan sports medicine specialist and youth baseball pioneer in his country.
  - Augie Donatelli, 75, National League umpire from 1950 to 1973 who initiated that league's trend toward a low strike zone, and spearheaded the formation of the first umpires' union.
- May 31 – Charlie Shoemaker, 50, backup infielder who hit .258 in 28 games for the Kansas City Athletics between 1961 and 1964.
- May – George McAllister, 91, first baseman for multiple Negro leagues teams, notably the Birmingham Black Barons, between 1923 and 1934.

=== June ===
- June 8:
  - Rafael Cabrera, 65, Cuban-born outfielder who played for the Cincinnati–Indianapolis Clowns of the Negro American League during the mid 1940s.
  - Neb Stewart, 72, backup outfielder who hit .129 in 10 games for the 1940 Philadelphia Phillies.
- June 12:
  - Glen Gorbous, 59, Canadian outfielder who hit .238 in 117 games with the Cincinnati Redlegs and Philadelphia Phillies from 1955 to 1957.
  - George McNamara, backup outfielder who hit .273 in three games with the 1922 Washington Senators.
  - Jim Walkup, 94, relief pitcher for the 1927 Detroit Tigers.
- June 15 – Bucky Jacobs, 77, relief pitcher who posted a 1-2 record with a 4.91 ERA in 22 games for the Washington Senators between 1937 and 1940.
- June 27 – Joe O'Rourke, 85, pinch-hitter for the 1929 Philadelphia Phillies.
- June 29 – Boyd Perry, 76, backup infielder who hit .181 in 36 games for the 1941 Detroit Tigers.

=== July ===
- July 7 – Don Bessent, 59, relief pitcher who posted a 14–7 record with a 4.08 ERA and 12 saves in 108 games for the Brooklyn/Los Angeles Dodgers from 1955 through 1958; member of Brooklyn's 1955 World Series champions.
- July 8 – R. R. M. Carpenter Jr., 74, owner or co-owner (1943–1981), club president (1943–1972) and de facto general manager (1948–1953) of the Philadelphia Phillies; 1949 Major League Baseball Executive of the Year.
- July 10 – Henry Coppola, 77, middle-relief pitcher who was 3–4 with a 5.65 ERA and one save for the Washington Senators from 1935 to 1936.
- July 24 – Andy Woehr, 94, backup third baseman who hit .274 in 63 games with the Philadelphia Phillies from 1923 to 1924.
- July 28 – Red Barrett, 75, All-Star pitcher for three NL teams who set a major league record for the fewest pitches (58) in a nine-inning game in 1944; led NL in wins (23) in 1945, a season split between the Boston Braves and St. Louis Cardinals.

=== August ===
- August 3 – Bob Brown, 79, pitcher who posted a 16–21 record with a 4.48 ERA in 79 appearances with the Boston Braves/Bees from 1930 to 1936.
- August 10 – Cookie Lavagetto, 77, All-Star third baseman who, with the Brooklyn Dodgers, spoiled Yankee Bill Bevens' no-hitter with two out in the ninth inning of Game 4 in the 1947 World Series, hitting a game-winning double; last manager of the 1901–1960 Washington Senators and the first skipper of Minnesota Twins (1957–1961).
- August 11 – Frank Dascoli, 74, National League umpire (1948 to 1961) who worked three World Series, two All-Star games and 2,059 league games; known for his quick thumb, he led NL umpires in ejections in two of his first three seasons, including 23 heave-hos in 1950.
- August 12 – Fay Thomas, 86, pitcher for the New York Giants, Cleveland Indians, Brooklyn Dodgers and St. Louis Browns between 1927 and 1935, who also appeared in the 1942 film The Pride of the Yankees as Christy Mathewson.
- August 15 – Bob Garbark, 80, backup catcher who hit .248 in 145 games with the Cleveland Indians, Chicago Cubs, Philadelphia Athletics and Boston Red Sox between 1934 and 1945.
- August 21:
  - Bill Lasley, 88, relief pitcher who appeared in two games for the 1924 St. Louis Browns.
  - Bob Uhl, 76, relief pitcher who played for the Chicago White Sox (1938) and Detroit Tigers (1940).
- August 24 – Mickey Witek, 74, second baseman who hit .277 with 22 home runs and 196 RBI in 580 games for the New York Giants from 1940 to 1949.
- August 28 – Larry Jackson, 59, five-time All-Star pitcher who won 194 games for the St. Louis Cardinals, Chicago Cubs and Philadelphia Phillies between 1955 and 1968; led NL in wins in 1964 with 24 for a Cubs' team that finished eighth in the ten-club circuit.
- August 30 – Lou Garland, 85, pitcher who posted an 0–2 record for the 1931 Chicago White Sox.
- August 31 – Jack Marshall, 82, second baseman for the Chicago American Giants (1931–1935, 1937–1938) as well as four other Negro leagues clubs between 1926 and 1944; selected an All-Star in 1933.

=== September ===
- September 1 – Buster Adams, 75, backup outfielder who hit .266 with 50 home runs and 249 RBI in 576 games for the St. Louis Cardinals (1939, 1943–1946) and Philadelphia Phillies (1947); member, 1946 World Series champions.
- September 2 – Mark Mauldin, 75, backup third baseman who hit .263 with one home run and three RBI in ten games for the 1934 Chicago White Sox.
- September 3 – Marshall Bridges, 59, relief pitcher who posted a 23–15 record with a 3.75 ERA and 25 saves in 206 games with the St. Louis Cardinals, Cincinnati Reds, New York Yankees and Washington Senators from 1959 to 1965, who during the 1962 World Series became first American League pitcher to cough up a grand slam in Fall Classic history; nevertheless, won World Series ring that season.
- September 6 – Al Veach, 81, pitcher who posted a 0–2 record for the 1935 Philadelphia Athletics.
- September 8 – Joe Gleason, 81, pitcher who posted a 2–2 record in 11 games for the Washington Senators in 1920 and 1922.
- September 9 – Doc Cramer, 85, five-time All-Star center fielder for four AL teams who collected 2,705 hits over 20 seasons (1929–1948) and was a defensive standout; the only AL player to twice go 6-for-6 in a nine-inning game.
- September 12 – Jim Romano, 63, pitcher who appeared in three games for the 1950 Brooklyn Dodgers.
- September 20 – Dick Gyselman, 82, backup infielder who hit .225 in 82 games for the Boston Braves from 1933 to 1934.
- September 23 – Betty Warfel, 62, pitcher and infielder who played for two All-American Girls Professional Baseball League champion teams spanning 1948–1949.
- September 24 – Johnny Werts, 92, pitcher who posted a 15–21 record with a 4.29 ERA in 88 games for the Boston Braves from 1926 through 1929.
- September 29 – Al McLean, 78, relief pitcher for the Washington Senators during the 1935 season.
- September 30 – Nels Potter, 79, pitcher who posted a 92–97 record with a 3.99 ERA in 349 appearances for the St. Louis Cardinals, Philadelphia Athletics, Boston Red Sox, St. Louis Browns and Boston Braves between 1936 and 1949; his 19 wins led 1944 Browns to their lone American League pennant.

=== October ===
- October 1 – June Emerson, 66, Canadian outfielder who played from 1948 to 1949 in the All-American Girls Professional Baseball League.
- October 2 – Heinie Schuble, 83, backup infielder who hit .251 with 11 home runs and 116 RBI in 332 games for the Cardinals and Tigers between 1927 and 1936.
- October 4 – Vance Dinges, 75, backup first baseman/outfielder who hit .291 with two home runs and 46 RBI in 159 games for the Philadelphia Phillies from 1945 to 1946.
- October 5 – Dixie Howell, 70, reserve catcher who appeared in 340 games over eight seasons for the Pittsburgh Pirates, Cincinnati Reds and Brooklyn Dodgers between 1947 and 1956; member of Brooklyn's 1955 world championship club.
- October 7 – Walt Ripley, 73, relief pitcher who played briefly for the 1935 Boston Red Sox.
- October 10:
  - George Barnicle, 73, pitcher who posted a 3–3 record with a 6.55 ERA in 20 games with the Boston Bees/Braves from 1939 to 1941.
  - Ziggy Marcell, 74, catcher/outfielder who played for seven Negro leagues clubs, including the Baltimore Elite Giants, Homestead Grays, and New York Black Yankees, between 1939 and 1948.
  - Wally Moses, 80, right fielder for the Philadelphia Athletics, Chicago White Sox and Boston Red Sox between 1935 and 1951 who hit .300 in his first seven seasons; 1937 All-Star; led AL in doubles and triples once each; later a batting coach for five MLB clubs, including three World Series winners, between 1952 and 1970.
- October 13 – Lino Donoso, 68, Cuban pitcher who posted a 4–6 record with a 5.21 ERA in 28 games for the Pittsburgh Pirates from 1955 to 1956.
- October 18 – Nick Etten, 77, All-Star first baseman who hit .277 with 89 home runs and 526 RBI in 937 games with three teams from 1938 to 1946; led American League in home runs (1944) and RBI (1945), and also was a member of the 1943 world champion New York Yankees.
- October 21 – Frank Waddey, 85, outfielder who hit .273 in 14 games with the 1931 St. Louis Browns.
- October 24 – Jim Clark, 63, backup infielder who hit .250 in nine games for the 1948 Washington Senators.

=== November ===
- November 3 – Jack Russell, 85, All-Star relief pitcher who won 85 games for six teams from 1926 to 1940 and twice led American League in saves (1933–1934); later, critical fundraiser for—and namesake of—Clearwater, Florida's Jack Russell Memorial Stadium, spring training home of the Phillies from 1955 to 2003.
- November 8 – Earl Torgeson, 66, hot-tempered first baseman who played 1,668 games over 16 MLB seasons (1946–1961) with five clubs; hit .389 in 1948 World Series with Boston Braves, led NL in runs in 1950.
- November 10 – Aurelio Monteagudo, 46, Cuban pitcher with five teams who also gained renown for pitching in the Venezuelan and Mexican leagues.
- November 12 – Junior Walsh, 71, middle-relief pitcher who posted a 4–10 record with a 5.88 ERA and two saves for the Pittsburgh Pirates between the 1946 and 1951 seasons.
- November 19 – John Fitzpatrick, 86, coach for the 1953–1955 Pirates and 1958–1959 Milwaukee Braves; former minor-league catcher and manager who spent 45 years in baseball.
- November 20 – Sonny Harris, 76, outfielder for four Negro leagues teams, notably the Cincinnati Tigers, between 1934 and 1942.
- November 22 – Joe Bowman, 80, pitcher for the Philadelphia Athletics, New York Giants, Philadelphia Phillies, Pittsburgh Pirates, Boston Red Sox and Cincinnati Reds over 11 seasons between 1932 and 1945.
- November 23 – Baudilio "Bo" Díaz, 37, Venezuelan catcher who appeared in 993 games between 1977 and 1989 for the Boston Red Sox, Cleveland Indians, Philadelphia Phillies and Cincinnati Reds; batted .333 for Phils in the 1983 World Series and selected All-Star in both major leagues (1979, 1987).
- November 28:
  - Tommy Hughes, 71, pitcher who posted a 31–56 record with a 3.92 ERA in 144 games with the Phillies (1941–1942 and 1946–1947) and Reds (1948).
  - Garcia Massingale, 62, catcher/pitcher for the 1944–1945 Kansas City Monarchs of the Negro American League.

=== December ===
- December 2:
  - John Britton, 71, third baseman who played in the Negro American League from 1942 to 1948, chiefly for the Birmingham Black Barons.
  - Paddy Smith, 96, backup catcher who played for the 1920 Boston Red Sox.
- December 3 – Clint Thomas, 94, outfielder/second baseman who played in Black baseball for 19 seasons (1920 to 1938), including 13 years in the Negro leagues, notably for the Hilldale club; batted .308 lifetime.
- December 7 – Lew Flick, 75, reserve outfielder who hit .175 in 20 games for the Philadelphia Athletics from 1943 to 1944.
- December 10 – Richard A. Meyer, 74, top executive with Anheuser-Busch Companies who became general manager of the St. Louis Cardinals in 1953 when August A. Busch Jr. purchased the team; stepped down as GM in October 1955, but remained executive vice president of Cardinals until February 1974.
- December 13 – Archie Ware, 72, All-Star first baseman who played in the Negro American League between 1941 and 1948, mainly for the Cleveland Buckeyes; also played two seasons (1951–1952) in racially integrated "Organized Baseball" minor leagues.
- December 15 – Bill Otis, 100, backup outfielder who appeared in four games with the 1912 New York Highlanders.
- December 16 – Wally Flager, 69, shortstop who hit .241 with two home runs and 21 RBI in 70 games for the Cincinnati Reds and Philadelphia Phillies during the 1945 season.
- December 18 – Charlie Gibson, 91, backup catcher who hit .133 in 12 games for the 1924 Philadelphia Athletics.
- December 28 – Shirley Crites, 56, AAGPBL infielder for the 1953 pennant-winning Fort Wayne Daisies.
