= Jennison =

Jennison is a surname. Notable people with the surname include:

- Abraham Jennison (1804–?), a convict transported to Western Australia
- Charles R. Jennison (1834–1884), hero of the anti-slavery faction during the Bleeding Kansas Affair and Union colonel during the American Civil War
- Jennison Heaton (1904–1971), American bobsled and skeleton racer who competed in the late 1920s
- Jennison Myrie-Williams (born 1988), English footballer who plays as a winger
- Martin Jennison, former association football player who represented New Zealand at international level
- Melissa Jennison (born 1982), athlete from Australia
- Ray Jennison (1910–1990), player in the National Football League
- Roger Clifton Jennison (1922–2006), radio astronomer at Jodrell Bank under the guidance of Robert Hanbury Brown
- Silas H. Jennison (1791–1849), American Whig politician

== See also ==
- Commonwealth of Massachusetts v. Nathaniel Jennison, decisive court case in Massachusetts in 1783 which effectively abolished slavery in that state
- Joshua Jennison House, historic house at 11 Thornton Street in the Newton Corner village of Newton, Massachusetts
