= Tarcisio =

Tarcisio or Tarcísio is a given name. Notable people with the given name include:

- Tarcisio Vincenzo Benedetti (1899–1972), Italian Roman Catholic bishop
- Tarcisio Bertone (born 1934), Italian Roman Catholic cardinal
- Tarcisio Burgnich (1939–2021), Italian football manager and player
- Tarcisio Catanese (1967–2017), Italian football player
- Tarcísio de Freitas (born 1975), Brazilian politician
- Tarcísio Filho (born 1964), Brazilian actor
- Tarcisio Fusco (1904–1962), Italian composer of film scores
- Tarcisio Gitti (1936–2018), Italian lawyer and politician
- Tarcisio Isao Kikuchi (born 1958), Japanese Roman Catholic bishop
- Tarcisio Longoni (1913–1990), Italian politician
- Tarcisio Lopes da Silva (born 1991), Brazilian football player
- Tarcisio Martina (1887–1961), Italian Catholic prelate
- Tarcísio Meira (1935–2021), Brazilian actor
- Tarcisio Merati (1934–1995), Italian painter
- Tarcisio Navarrete (1954–2025), Mexican politician and diplomat
- Tarcísio Padilha (1928–2021), Brazilian philosopher
- Tarcisio Stramare (1928–2020), Italian priest, biblical scholar, writer and teacher
