= Longoni =

Longoni may refer to:

- Longoni (company), manufacturer of cue sticks
- Longoni, Mayotte, a village in the commune of Koungou on Mayotte
- Longoni (surname), an Italian surname
