= Jennis =

Jennis is a surname. Notable people with the surname include:

- Lucas Jennis (1590–1630), German engraver
- Anne Fleming and Catherine Jennis
- Nellie Jennis and Bob Jennis, fictional characters in The Baby on the Barge, 1915 British silent film

== See also ==
- Jennison
- Jenni
- Ennis (disambiguation)
