= Leo McPartland =

Australian rules footballer

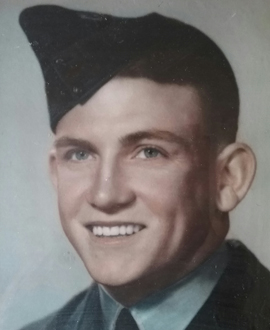

Personal information
- Full name: Leo McPartland
- Born: 26 June 1920; Shepparton, Victoria
- Died: 29 July 1994 (aged 74); Queensland
- Original team: Claremont (WAFL)
- Height: 170 cm (5 ft 7 in)
- Weight: 73.5 kg (162 lb)

Playing career^{1}
Years	Club	Games (Goals)
1943	Collingwood	4 (1)
- ^{1} Playing statistics correct to the end of 1943.

Leo McPartland (26 June 1920 – 29 July 1994) was an Australian rules footballer who played with Collingwood in the Victorian Football League (VFL).

McPartland enlisted in the Royal Australian Air Force in August 1940, serving until the end of World War II. It was during this period of service that he played four senior games for Collingwood, scoring a goal in his final game against Hawthorn.

McPartland's brother Andy played for Essendon.

== Sources ==
- Cullen, B. (2015) Harder than Football, Slattery Media Group: Melbourne. ISBN 9780992379148.
- Holmesby, R. & , Main, J. (2014) The Encyclopedia of AFL Footballers: every AFL/VFL player since 1897 (10th ed.), BAS Publishing: Seaford, Victoria. ISBN 978-1-921496-32-5.
