= Longoni (surname) =

Longoni is a surname of Italian origin. Notable people with the surname include:

- Angelo Longoni (1933–1993), Italian footballer
- Carlo Longoni (1889 – 1969), Italian racing cyclist
- Emilio Longoni (1859–1932), Italian painter
- Lucas Longoni (born 1985), Italian Argentine footballer
- Tarcisio Longoni (1913–1990), Italian politician
