= 1990 Senior League World Series =

American youth baseball tournament

Tournament information
- Location: Kissimmee, Florida
- Dates: August 12–18, 1990

Final positions
- Champions: Taipei, Taiwan
- Runner-up: Danville, California

The 1990 Senior League World Series took place from August 12–18 in Kissimmee, Florida, United States. Taipei, Taiwan defeated Danville, California in the championship game. It was Taiwan's third straight title.

In an effort to boost attendance, the Host team was re-introduced.

== Teams ==
United States	International
(Florida) Conway, Florida; District 3 Host	Edmonton, Alberta Canada
South Gibson, Indiana Central	Brussels, Belgium Europe
(Pennsylvania) Montoursville, Pennsylvania East	(Taiwan) Taipei, Taiwan Far East
(Florida) Venice, Florida South	Maracaibo, Venezuela Latin America
(California) Danville, California West	

== Results ==
Winner's Bracket

Opening Game
—	(Florida) Host	8
—	Belgium	5

—
1–0	(Florida) Host	6
—	Pennsylvania	0
—	Florida	2
—	Canada	0
—	California	4
—	Venezuela	3
—	Indiana	0
—	Taiwan	16

—
2–0	(Florida) Host	6
1–0	Florida	7
1–0	California	1
1–0	Taiwan	14

Bracket Final
2–0	Florida	0
2–0	Taiwan	2

Loser's Bracket

—
0–1	Belgium	2
0–1	Canada	7
0–1	Indiana	2
0–1	Venezuela	15

—
0–1	Pennsylvania	0
1–1	Venezuela	8
1–1	California	19
1–1	Canada	1

—
2–1	(Florida) Host	5
2–1	Venezuela	1
2–1	Florida	6
2–1	California	7

Bracket Final
3–1	(Florida) Host	8
3–1	California	17

Placement Bracket

—
0–2	Belgium	8
0–2	Indiana	7

—
1–2	Canada	6
1–2	Belgium	9
0–2	Pennsylvania	7
2–2	Venezuela	6

—
2–2	Florida	15
2–2	Belgium	6
3–2	(Florida) Host	2
1–2	Pennsylvania	10

Third Place Game
3–2	Florida	8
2–2	Pennsylvania	5

Elimination Round

Semifinals
2–0	Florida	0
2–0	Taiwan	2
3–1	(Florida) Host	8
3–1	California	17

World Championship
3–0	Taiwan	8
4–1	California	0
Third Place Game
3–2	Florida	8
2–2	Pennsylvania	5

1990 Senior League World Series Champions
Taipei, Taiwan
