= 1990 Junior League World Series =

League games which took place in Taylor, Michigan, US

Tournament information
- Location: Taylor, Michigan
- Dates: August 13–18

Final positions
- Champions: Yabucoa, Puerto Rico
- Runner-up: San Antonio, Texas

The 1990 Junior League World Series took place from August 13–18 in Taylor, Michigan, United States. Yabucoa, Puerto Rico defeated San Antonio, Texas in the championship game. It was Puerto Rico's second straight championship.

This year featured the debut of the Europe Region.

== Teams ==
United States	International
(Illinois) Illinois Central	(British Columbia) Whalley, British Columbia Canada
(New Jersey) New Jersey East	(West Germany) Kaiserslautern, West Germany; KMC; Europe
(Texas) San Antonio, Texas; McAllister Park; South	Mexico Mexico
(Hawaii) Aiea, Hawaii West	Yabucoa, Puerto Rico Puerto Rico

== Results ==
Upper round 1	Upper round 2	Upper final	World Championship
—	New Jersey	6
—	Canada	4
1–0	New Jersey	4
1–0	Illinois	8
—	West Germany
—	Illinois
2–0	Illinois
2–0	Puerto Rico
—	Mexico
—	Puerto Rico
1–0	Puerto Rico (F/10)	6
1–0	Hawaii	5
—	Texas	4
—	Hawaii	5	3–0	Puerto Rico	6	—
4–1	Texas	4	—
Lower round 1	Lower round 2	Lower round 3	Lower final
1–1	Hawaii	11
0–1	Canada	1–1	West Germany	4	2–1	Illinois
0–1	West Germany	2–1	Hawaii	3	3–1	Texas
2–1	Texas	8
1–1	New Jersey	4
0–1	Mexico	1–1	Texas	12
0–1	Texas

1990 Junior League World Series Champions
Yabucoa, Puerto Rico
