= Andy McPartland =

Australian rules footballer, born 1915

Personal information
- Full name: Andrew Michael McPartland
- Born: 25 November 1915; Shepparton, Victoria
- Died: 2 May 1990 (aged 74); Bentley, Western Australia
- Original team: Moonee Valley / Dowerin
- Height: 173 cm (5 ft 8 in)
- Weight: 80 kg (176 lb)

Playing career^{1}
Years	Club	Games (Goals)
1941	Essendon	1 (0)
- ^{1} Playing statistics correct to the end of 1941.

Andrew Michael McPartland (25 November 1915 – 2 May 1990) was an Australian rules footballer who played for the Essendon Football Club in the Victorian Football League (VFL).

McPartland enlisted in the Royal Australian Air Force in January 1940, serving until the end of World War II. It was during this period of service that he played his single senior game for Essendon, appearing as 19th man in their Round 16 1941 match against Hawthorn.

McPartland's brother Leo played for Collingwood Football Club.

== Sources ==
- Cullen, B. (2015) Harder than Football, Slattery Media Group: Melbourne. ISBN 9780992379148.
