= Fred Patterson (footballer) =

Australian rules footballer (1916–1990)

Personal information
- Full name: Frederick Patterson
- Born: 1 January 1916; Day Dawn, Western Australia
- Died: 29 May 1990 (aged 74); Western Australia
- Height: 175 cm (5 ft 9 in)
- Weight: 70 kg (154 lb)

Playing career^{1}
Years	Club	Games (Goals)
1935–40	East Perth	
1943	South Melbourne	1 (0)
- ^{1} Playing statistics correct to the end of 1943.

Frederick Patterson (1 January 1916 – 29 May 1990) was an Australian rules footballer who played with East Perth in the West Australian Football League (WAFL) and South Melbourne in the Victorian Football League (VFL).

Patterson played for East Perth from 1935 to 1940 before enlisting in the Royal Australian Air Force during World War II. While serving he played a single game for South Melbourne in Round 1 of the 1943 VFL season. He later served in the Pacific, being part of the Morotai Boomerangs services football team in 1945.
