= Fred McDaniel =

American baseball player

- Outfielder
- Born: January 21, 1913; Henderson, Texas, U.S.
- Died: January 8, 1990 (aged 76); Garland, Texas, U.S.
- Batted: Left Threw: Right

Negro league baseball debut
- 1942, for the Memphis Red Sox

Last appearance
- 1946, for the Memphis Red Sox

Teams
- Memphis Red Sox (1942–1946)

Fred Youngblood McDaniel (January 21, 1913 – January 8, 1990), sometimes listed as "McDaniels", was an American Negro league outfielder in the 1940s.

A native of Henderson, Texas, McDaniel made his Negro leagues debut in 1942 with the Memphis Red Sox. He went on to play four more seasons with Memphis through 1946. McDaniel died in Garland, Texas in 1990 at age 76.
