= Joshua Jennison House =

Historic house in Massachusetts, United States

- U.S. National Register of Historic Places
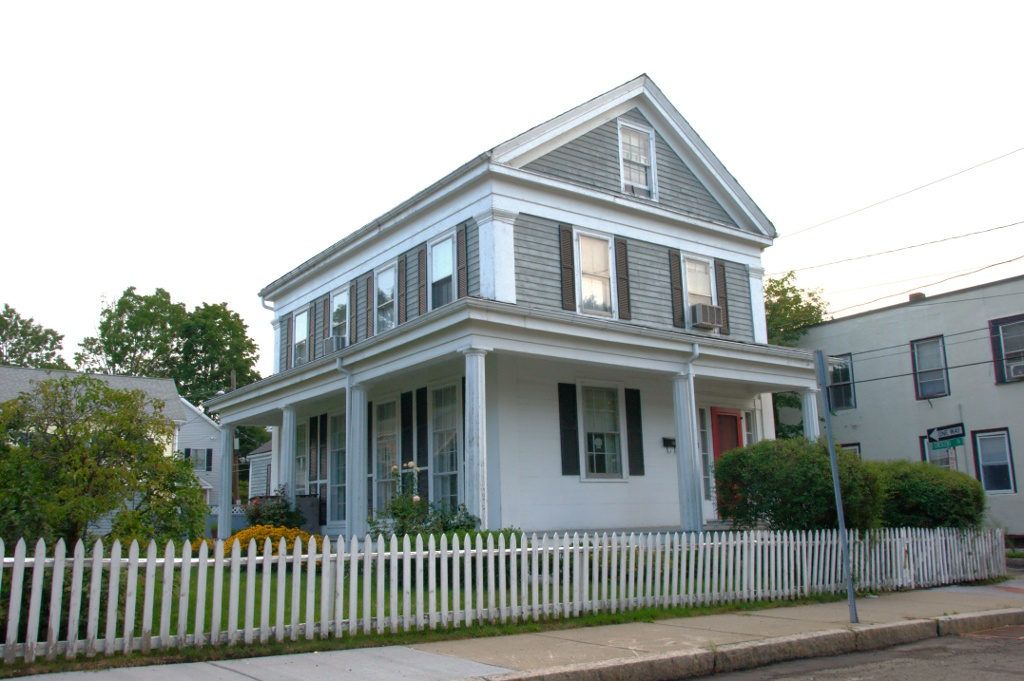

- Location within Massachusetts Location within the United States
- Location: 11 Thornton St., Newton, Massachusetts
- Coordinates: 42°21′28″N 71°11′24″W
- Built: 1845
- Architectural style: Greek Revival
- MPS: Newton MRA
- NRHP reference No.: 86001844
- Added to NRHP: September 04, 1986

The Joshua Jennison House is a historic house at located 11 Thornton Street in the Newton Corner village of Newton, Massachusetts.

== Description and history ==
The 2 1/2-story wood-frame house was built in the 1840s, and is an exceptional example of a modest Greek Revival house. The first floor area under the wraparound porch is flushboarded, and the front entry is flanked by sidelight windows and cornerboards. The house has pilastered corner boards and a full entablature. Houses of this type were once quite common in Newton.

The house was listed on the National Register of Historic Places on September 4, 1986.

== See also ==
- National Register of Historic Places listings in Newton, Massachusetts
