= Tarcisio Merati =

Italian painter

- Born: 27 May 1934; Bonate Sopra, Italy
- Died: 22 October 1995 (aged 61); Bergamo, Italy
- Known for: Painting

Tarcisio Merati (27 May 1934 – 22 October 1995), also known as "Coccolone", was an Italian outsider artist. He spent much of his adult life, including most of his artistically productive years, in a psychiatric hospital. He produced a large quantity of drawings, texts and musical compositions. He is best known for his drawings of "dream toys".

== Early life ==
Merati was born in Bonate Sopra, a town near Bergamo, on 27 May 1934. He grew up an artisanal family (from the book Tarcisio Merati opere 1975-1991 print in the 1993). His mother was sacristan in her spare time. In the summer of 1959 Merati was admitted to a psychiatric hospital in Bergamo. His clinical folder says: "Schizophrenia" and later: "Psychosis, retardate". Over the next several years he was released and readmitted to the hospital many times(from the book Tarcisio Merati opere 1975-1991 print in the 1993).

From 1974 to 1984, Merati's mental condition did not change greatly, but his creative output increased. A clinical note dated 23 July 1983 reads: "He’s discreetly clean, in the atelier [occupational therapy ward] too, he draws pictures quite abstract (from article of Maria Rita Parsi in Tarcisio Merati opere 1975-1991 print in the 1993). Actually those years are the more interesting in his artistic production(from the book Tarcisio Merati opere 1975-1991 print in the 1993. During this time, Merati's care was managed by Amilcare Cristini, who befriended Merati and introduced him to painting. Painting is not the only passion of "coccolone", he's very good with words and music too. As a matter of fact at the beginning he was famous, and sometimes searched, for his particular and eccentric way of talking, and for his unintelligible but genial dialectic performances. The music played by him (especially on the unturned piano in the atelier) had some obsessive and minimalist characteristics. In his artistic collection his objects are often repeated; they're always Story Toy, just simple abstract toys which he describes as "macchinetta trombetta" (trumpet machine) or "aeroplanino silurino" (torpedo airplane) not to mention the without numbers "uccellino sul nidino" (bird in his little nest), the cactus and the pine cones. After the Basaglia's Law, dated 1983, with frequent permissions and later in 1984 he's free to leave the hospital when he desires. As a consequence he has to leave the Atelier, has to live with his sister and that's when Merati gives up painting. In 1991 Tarcisio moves to a home for the aged near the old hospital and near to the beloved Atelier. Thank to some permissions he can go and start drawing again, but his rhythm is very slow and tired. Nevertheless, in 1993 a big event happens: at the Social Theatre of Bergamo his first exhibition is organized and later, in 2006 there has been a second exhibition titled "Beyond the reason" that Bergamo and the county of Lombardia dedicate to the mayor artist of the mental hospital art, the so-called Art Brut. Unfortunately Merati doesn't live here, he died in 1995, 22 October because of a lung cancer. It is deserving to remember how many things in common Merati has with another marginal artist, another great protagonist as Adolf Wölfli. Both shared a surprising simile and (without knowing it) biography, artistic style and human characteristics.

Extracted by a critical report of Bianca Tosatti:

... Tarcisio Merati is the manicomia artist for excellence: to the shelter from the hostile world against which he is insert in form of novelist, musician, political man, teacher; to the shelter from the poverties and from the vulgarity he can finally devote to the operation of the wonder.
