= Garcia Massingale =

American baseball player

- Pinch hitter
- Born: June 22, 1928; Kansas City, Kansas
- Died: November 28, 1990 (aged 62); Seattle, Washington

Negro league baseball debut
- 1944, for the Kansas City Monarchs

Last appearance
- 1945, for the Kansas City Monarchs

Teams
- Kansas City Monarchs (1944–1945)

Garcia Massingale (June 22, 1928 – November 28, 1990) was an American Negro league baseball player in the 1940s.

A native of Kansas City, Kansas, Massingale played for the Kansas City Monarchs in 1945. He died in Seattle, Washington in 1990 at age 62.
