= Roemon Fields =

- Center fielder
- Born: November 28, 1990 (age 35); Seattle, Washington
- Bats: Left Throws: Left
- Stats at Baseball Reference

Roemon C. Fields (born November 28, 1990) is an American professional baseball center fielder who is a free agent.

== High school and college ==
Fields attended Rainier Beach High School, and was not drafted in the 2009 Major League Baseball draft. He then attended Yakima Valley Community College for a year, before transferring to Bethany College in Kansas. In 2012, Fields was invited to take part in a pre-draft workout at Kauffman Stadium, but again went undrafted, and returned to Bethany College. In two seasons at Bethany, he batted .399 with 59 stolen bases. After the 2013 collegiate season, Fields stopped playing baseball and worked at a Lids franchise in addition to delivering mail for the post office.

== Professional career ==
Later in 2013, Fields' manager at Yakima invited him to participate in the 2013 World Baseball Challenge, as he was coaching the USA team. Fields batted .379 with three stolen bases in eight games in the tournament, earning him a contract offer with the Blue Jays organization. Fields signed on August 27, 2013, and made his professional baseball debut with the Short Season-A Vancouver Canadians in 2014. In 72 games, Fields hit .269 with one home run and 26 RBI. He also established a new Canadians franchise record for stolen bases in a single season, with 48.

Fields played in five spring training games for Toronto in 2015, and began the season with the Advanced-A Dunedin Blue Jays. He advanced to the Double-A New Hampshire Fisher Cats, and then to the Triple-A Buffalo Bisons. He was returned to New Hampshire on August 12. In total for 2015, Fields played in 121 games and hit .262 with two home runs, 33 RBI, and 46 stolen bases. Fields was invited to Major League spring training on January 12, 2016, and reassigned to minor league camp on March 12. He was assigned to New Hampshire to open the 2016 minor league season. In 130 games for the Fisher Cats, Fields hit .227 with four home runs, 32 RBI, and 44 stolen bases. Fields played in 119 games in 2017, mostly with Buffalo, and hit .283 with 34 RBI and 50 stolen bases. On January 24, 2018, the Blue Jays invited Fields to spring training. He played 100 games with the Bisons in 2018, batting .238 with two home runs, 27 RBI, and 25 stolen bases. Fields returned to the Bisons in 2019, appearing in 99 games with a .254 average, two home runs, 22 RBI, and 16 stolen bases.
