= Aladár Háberl =

Hungarian Nordic combined skier

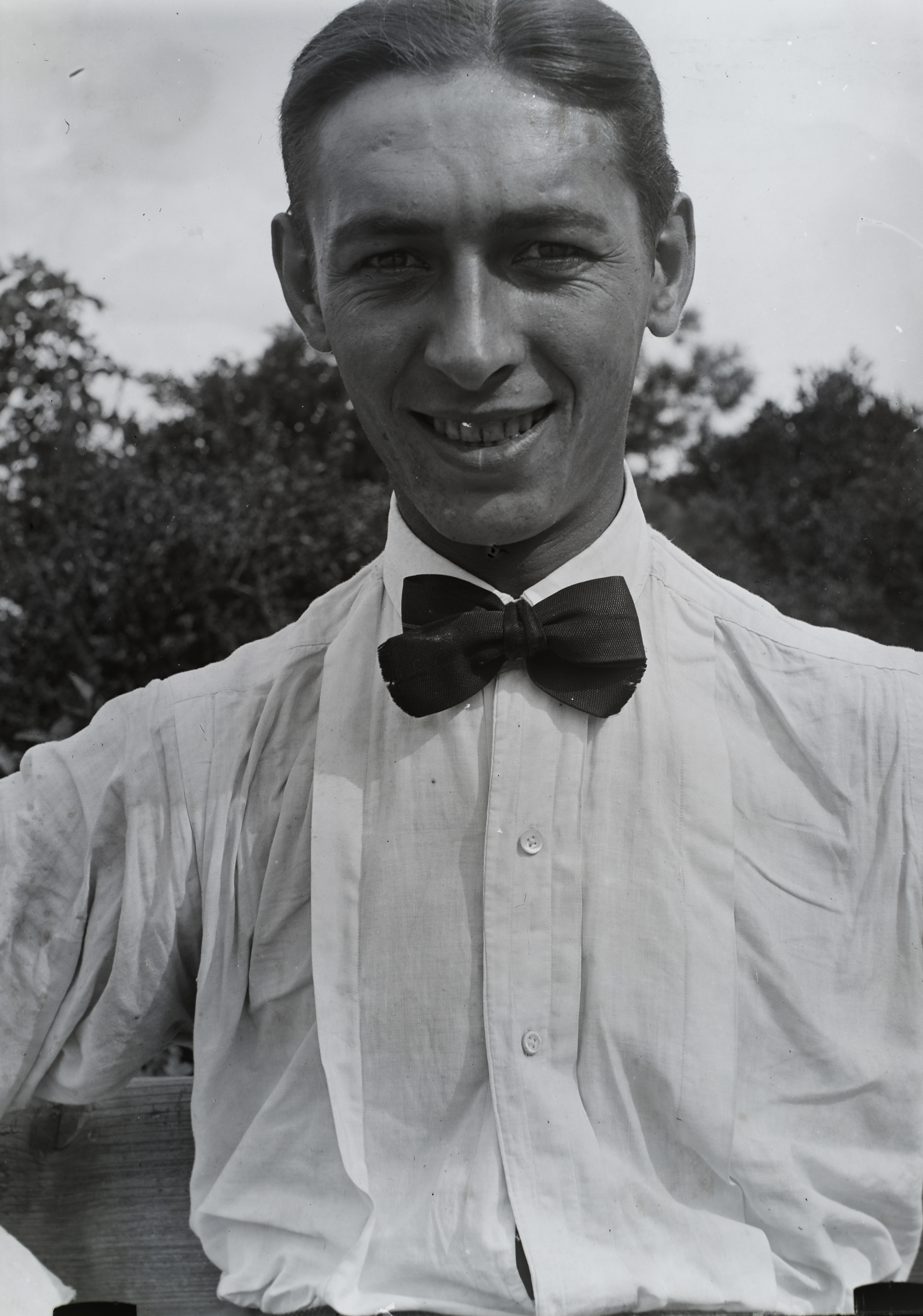

Personal information
- Nationality: Hungarian
- Born: 9 February 1898; Budapest, Austria-Hungary
- Died: 19 May 1990 (aged 92); Budapest, Hungary

Sport
- Sport: Nordic combined

Aladár Háberl (9 February 1898 – 19 May 1990) was a Hungarian skier. He competed in the Nordic combined event at the 1924 Winter Olympics.
