= Wilderich Freiherr Ostman von der Leye =

German politician, member of the Bundestag

Wilderich Freiherr Ostman von der Leye MdB
- In office 1969–1976

Personal details
- Born: June 4, 1923 Bonn, Germany
- Died: May 30, 1990 Bremen
- Party: Social Democratic Party of Germany

Wilderich Freiherr Ostman von der Leye (4 June 1923 – 30 May 1990) was a German SPD politician.

== Life and career ==
Wilderich Freiherr Ostman von der Leye belonged to the Westphalian Ostman von der Leye family. After matriculation, he was a marine from 1941 to 1945. After the War, he studied Law and Medicine from 1946 to 1954. After that, he was a partner in a number of publishing houses.

== Political career ==
Ostman von der Leye joined the SPD in 1957. From 1964 to 1973 he was on the Bonn city council. At the 1969 West German federal election he stood for election and was elected on the party list. He was re-elected in 1972 and remained a member of the Bundestag until the end of the session in 1976. In the Bundestag he sat on the special committee for criminal law reform.

He remained in politics until his death in 1990.
