= Abraham Jennison =

English convict transported to Western Australia

Abraham Jennison (11 April 1804 – ?) was one of the 162,000 British convicts transported to Western Australia. His significance is mainly that one of his letters home to family in England is extant.

== Biography ==
Jennison was born into poverty in April 1804 in Belper. He was the eldest of 5 children to a modestly employed nail-maker and his wife. Jennison followed in his father's vocational footsteps. He began learning the family trade under his father's guidance while receiving supplementary home tutoring from his mother.

He was married in the year 1825 and went on have 11 children. As of July 1848, he was working as a blacksmith. Later that month, he and two companions were convicted of stealing items including a gun and a pig, and Jennison was sentenced to seven years' transportation. He arrived in Western Australia aboard Pyrenees in June 1851, and was immediately issued with a ticket of leave. He received a conditional pardon in December 1854. Thereafter, he worked for a number of years at Tibradden, John Sydney Davis' Champion Bay station.

In November 1861, Jennison received letters from his children telling him that his wife Hannah had died, and enquiring about joining him in Australia. Jennison's reply, in which he stated that "A person can do very well if he is a mind to work", was kept by his family for generations, and is extant today. Jennison's family did not emigrate to Australia and this letter is apparently the last letter that he wrote to his children. Nothing is known of Jennison's later life.

== Sources ==
- Erickson, Rica (1983). "New Horizons". In Erickson, Rica (ed.). The Brand on his Coat: Biographies of some Western Australian Convicts. Nedlands: UWA Publishing. ISBN 0-85564-223-8. LCCN 84145691. OCLC 12051617. OL 2914148M. Wikidata Q133820754.
