= Eduardo Nicol =

Mexican-Catalan philosopher

Eduardo Nicol (13 December 1907 in Barcelona, Spain – 6 May 1990 in Mexico) was a Mexican-Catalan philosopher. He arrived in Mexico in 1939, obtained his major in philosophy from National Autonomous University of Mexico (UNAM), the biggest university in Mexico, where he taught from 1940. While at UNAM, he became the chairs of adolescent psychology and the history of psychology following Ezequiel A. Chávez.

== Bibliography ==
He is author of many books, collected by the press house FCE (Fondo de Cultura Económica) his most notable ones are:

- Psicología de las situaciones vitales
- La idea del hombre
- Historicismo y existencialismo
- La vocación humana
- Metafísica de la expresión
- El problema de la filosofía hispánica
- Los principios de la ciencia
- El porvenir de la filosofía
- Metafísica de la expresión (nueva versión)
- La idea del hombre (nueva versión)
- La primera teoría de la praxis
- La reforma de la filosofía
- La agonía de Proteo
- Crítica de la razón simbólica
- Ideas de vario linaje
- Formas de hablar sublime. Poesía y filosofía
