= Martin Jennison =

New Zealand footballer

Personal information
- Full name: Martin J Jennison
- Place of birth: New Zealand

Senior career*
Years	Team	Apps	(Gls)
- Mount Wellington

International career
1988	New Zealand	2	(0)
- * Club domestic league appearances and goals

Martin Jennison is a former association football player who represented New Zealand at international level.

Jennison played two official A-international matches for the New Zealand in 1988, both World Cup qualifiers against Taiwan, the first a 4–0 win on 12 December, the second three days later a 4–1 win on 12 December 1988.
