= Ray Jennison =

American football player (1910–1990)

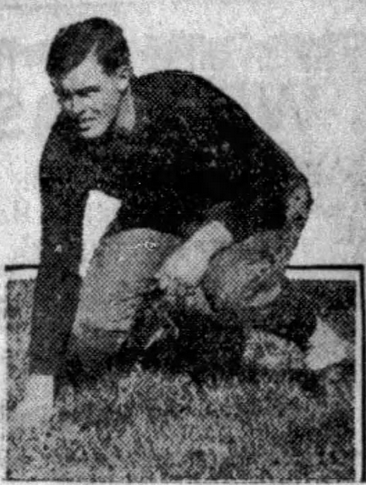
- Jennison, c. 1929

No. 31, 24
- Position: Tackle

Personal information
- Born: January 19, 1910; Onida, South Dakota, U.S.
- Died: May 13, 1990 (aged 80); Bay Pines, Florida, U.S.
- Listed height: 6 ft 2 in (1.88 m)
- Listed weight: 224 lb (102 kg)

Career information
- High school: Avon (Avon, South Dakota)
- College: South Dakota State (1927–1930)

Career history
- Green Bay Packers (1931); Rock Island Greenbush (1931); Cincinnati Reds (1933)*; Indianapolis Indians (1933); St. Louis Gunners (1933–1934); Tulsa Oilers (1934)
- * Offseason or practice squad member only

Awards and highlights
- NFL champion (1931)

Career statistics
- Games played: 2
- Stats at Pro Football Reference

Raymond Ellis Jennison (né Jenison; January 19, 1910 – May 13, 1990) was an American professional football player. A tackle, he played college football for the South Dakota State Jackrabbits. He later played one season in the National Football League (NFL) for the Green Bay Packers in 1931, appearing in two games as they won the NFL championship. He also played with several other professional teams in Illinois, Ohio, Indiana, Missouri and Oklahoma. After his football career, he served as a colonel in the United States Army and as a military attaché in Europe.

== Early life ==
Jennison was born in Onida, South Dakota, on January 19, 1910. His family spelled their last name "Jenison", but he said that "people were always misspelling it," and so he later legally changed his last name to "Jennison". He attended Avon High School in South Dakota, and is their only alumnus to play in the NFL.

Jennison enrolled at South Dakota State College (SDSU) in 1927. He played for SDSU's freshman football team that year as a lineman. He then made the varsity team in 1928 and started at right tackle, helping South Dakota State finish as runner-up in the North Central Conference (NCC) while being named first-team All-NCC. Described as one of the team's "huskiest linemen", he won All-NCC honors again in 1929. The biggest player on the team at 198 pounds (90 kg), he was named captain as a senior in 1930. After the season, he was named second-team All-NCC by the Associated Press (AP). Jennison was nicknamed "Bozo". With South Dakota State, he served as athletic director and basketball coach for SDSU's school of agriculture. He was a member of the Reserve Officers' Training Corps (ROTC) in college. He also competed as a boxer and wrestler, winning competitions in those sports at ROTC events. In June 1931, Jennison was commissioned as a second lieutenant in the U.S. military reserves.

Jennison earned a bachelor's degree and a master's degree from South Dakota State.

== Professional career ==
After college, Jennison signed to play professional football for the Green Bay Packers of the NFL, and played with them early in the 1931 season. Playing tackle, he appeared in two games for the Packers in 1931, both as a starter, as they went on to win the NFL championship. However, he had left the team by October and joined the Rock Island Greenbush, an independent team that played against the Chicago Cardinals. He returned to South Dakota in November and told the Sioux Valley News of his experience as a Packer, noting that the professional game "is faster and cleaner than college football, but ... the old college spirit [is] lacking in many crucial times."

In 1932, Jennison returned to school and received a degree. He also competed as a wrestler when not playing pro football. In August 1933, he signed with the NFL's Cincinnati Reds. However, he was later released, without having appeared in any games. In early September, he joined the Indianapolis Indians prior to their game against the NFL's Portsmouth Spartans. Later that month, he left for the St. Louis Gunners to play guard. He missed some time for the Gunners that season due to a dislocated shoulder. He began the 1934 season with the Gunners but was later purchased in October by the Tulsa Oilers of the American Football League (AFL). He appeared in four games for the Oilers, three as a starter, as they placed sixth in the league with a record of 1–5–1.

== Later life and death ==
Jennison married Marie R. Jennison in 1935, but they later separated in 1936. As of 1937, he was working as a salesman for a plow company. He remarried to Mary Garnett Jennison of Kentucky, and the two had a son and a daughter.

Jennison served in the United States Army. He served in World War II, and according to the Argus-Leader, he "saw action in nearly every theater of war, from the Dieppen raid [sic] to Tunisia where he aided in the defeat of Rummell's Afrika Corps [sic], to England after Dunkirk and to North Africa." He later served as a military attaché in Paris, France, and London, England, and retired with the rank of colonel.

Jennison lived in Hopkinsville, Kentucky, for a time, before later moving to Washington, D.C., and then to South Pasadena, Florida. In Washington, D.C., he served as president of the American Corn Millers Federation and the American Society of Association Executives, while he was also the governor of 157 clubs for Toastmasters International and a charter member of the Elks Lodge in Chevy Chase, Maryland. He was also a member of the Magnolia Lodge and a president of the South Dakota Society. While in Florida, he served as president of the St. Petersburg Beach High Noon Lions Club and the Optimist Club of Bay Islands. He was a member of the Pasadena Community Church.

Jennison died on May 13, 1990, at the age of 80, at the VA Medical Center in Bay Pines, Florida.
