= Luther Clifford =

American baseball player (1924-1990)

- Catcher
- Born: January 16, 1924; Clairton, Pennsylvania, U.S.
- Died: May 4, 1990 (aged 66); Brantford, Ontario, Canada
- Batted: Right Threw: Right

Negro league baseball debut
- 1948, for the Homestead Grays

Last appearance
- 1948, for the Homestead Grays
- Stats at Baseball Reference

Teams
- Homestead Grays (1948)

Luther Franklin Clifford Jr. (January 16, 1924 – May 4, 1990), nicknamed "Shanty", was an American Negro league catcher in the 1940s.

A native of Clairton, Pennsylvania, Clifford attended Clairton High School. He played for the Homestead Grays during their 1948 Negro World Series championship season. Clifford went on to play minor league baseball in the Mandak League with the Brandon Grays in 1952. He died in Brantford, Ontario in 1990 at age 66.
