= Tarcisio Longoni =

Italian minister (1913–1990)

- Born: 28 May 1913; Brugherio
- Died: 14 May 1990 (aged 76)
- Known for: Italian minister

Tarcisio Longoni (28 May 1913 – 14 May 1990) was an Italian minister.

== Life ==
Longoni was born in Brugherio in 1913. He served as an Italian deputy from 12 June 1958 to 15 May 1963. During this time, he served as Secretary of State for Foreign Trade for Amintore Fanfani's third government from 28 July 1960 to 20 February 1962. He died in 1990.
