= List of New York Mets broadcasters =

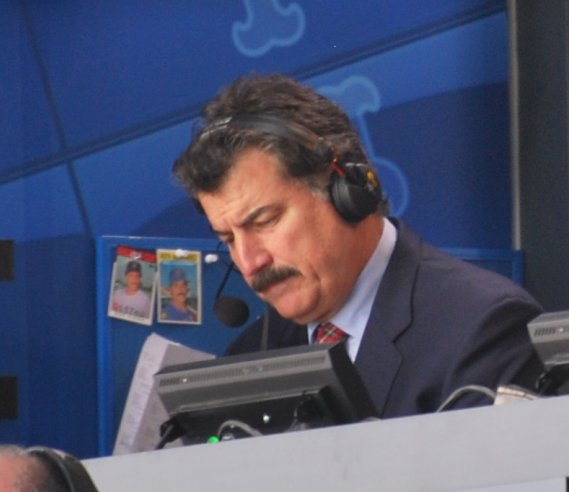
Keith Hernandez in Citi Field's broadcast booth

Current broadcasters:

- Television: SportsNet New York (SNY) or WPIX channel 11
  - Gary Cohen, Steve Gelbs, Ron Darling, Keith Hernandez
- Radio: WHSQ 880 AM (English)
  - Keith Raad, Patrick McCarthy
- Radio: WINS 92.3 HD2 (Spanish)
  - Max Perez-Jimenez, Nestor Rosario, Johnny Trujillo

== Broadcast history ==
=== Television ===
- SportsNet New York (2006–present)
- WPIX (1999–present)
- MSG Network (2002–2005)
- MSG Metro Channels (2002–2005)
- SportsChannel New York/FSN New York (1980–2005)
- (W)WOR-TV (1962–1998)

=== Television Broadcasters by Year ===
Year	Channel	Play-by-play #1	Play-by-play #2	Play-by-play #3	Color Commentator(s)	Field Reporter
1962	WOR-TV	Lindsey Nelson	Bob Murphy	Ralph Kiner	Lindsey Nelson; Bob Murphy; Ralph Kiner	
1963	WOR-TV	Lindsey Nelson	Bob Murphy	Ralph Kiner	Lindsey Nelson; Bob Murphy; Ralph Kiner	
1964	WOR-TV	Lindsey Nelson	Bob Murphy	Ralph Kiner	Lindsey Nelson; Bob Murphy; Ralph Kiner	
1965	WOR-TV	Lindsey Nelson	Bob Murphy	Ralph Kiner	Lindsey Nelson; Bob Murphy; Ralph Kiner	
1966	WOR-TV	Lindsey Nelson	Bob Murphy	Ralph Kiner	Lindsey Nelson; Bob Murphy; Ralph Kiner	
1967	WOR-TV	Lindsey Nelson	Bob Murphy	Ralph Kiner	Lindsey Nelson; Bob Murphy; Ralph Kiner	
1968	WOR-TV	Lindsey Nelson	Bob Murphy	Ralph Kiner	Lindsey Nelson; Bob Murphy; Ralph Kiner	
1969	WOR-TV	Lindsey Nelson	Bob Murphy	Ralph Kiner	Lindsey Nelson; Bob Murphy; Ralph Kiner	
1970	WOR-TV	Lindsey Nelson	Bob Murphy	Ralph Kiner	Lindsey Nelson; Bob Murphy; Ralph Kiner	
1971	WOR-TV	Lindsey Nelson	Bob Murphy	Ralph Kiner	Lindsey Nelson; Bob Murphy; Ralph Kiner	
1972	WOR-TV	Lindsey Nelson	Bob Murphy	Ralph Kiner	Lindsey Nelson; Bob Murphy; Ralph Kiner	
1973	WOR-TV	Lindsey Nelson	Bob Murphy	Ralph Kiner	Lindsey Nelson; Bob Murphy; Ralph Kiner	
1974	WOR-TV	Lindsey Nelson	Bob Murphy	Ralph Kiner	Lindsey Nelson; Bob Murphy; Ralph Kiner	
1975	WOR-TV	Lindsey Nelson	Bob Murphy	Ralph Kiner	Lindsey Nelson; Bob Murphy; Ralph Kiner	
1976	WOR-TV	Lindsey Nelson	Bob Murphy	Ralph Kiner	Lindsey Nelson; Bob Murphy; Ralph Kiner	
1977	WOR-TV	Lindsey Nelson	Bob Murphy	Ralph Kiner	Lindsey Nelson; Bob Murphy; Ralph Kiner	
1978	WOR-TV	Lindsey Nelson	Bob Murphy	Ralph Kiner	Lindsey Nelson; Bob Murphy; Ralph Kiner; Bob Wolff	
1979	WOR-TV SportsChannel New York	Bob Murphy	Ralph Kiner	Steve Albert	Ralph Kiner; Bob Murphy; Steve Albert	
1980	WOR-TV SportsChannel New York	Bob Murphy	Ralph Kiner	Steve Albert	Ralph Kiner; Bob Murphy; Steve Albert; Bob Goldsholl	
1981	WOR-TV SportsChannel New York	Bob Murphy	Ralph Kiner	Steve Albert	Ralph Kiner; Bob Murphy; Steve Albert; Art Shamsky	
1982	WOR-TV; SportsChannel New York	Ralph Kiner	Lorn Brown	Lorn Brown; Ralph Kiner Bob Murphy	Ralph Kiner; Lorn Brown; Bob Murphy; Jiggs McDonald	
1983	WOR-TV; SportsChannel New York	Ralph Kiner	Tim McCarver	Steve Zabriskie Bud Harrelson	Ralph Kiner; Tim McCarver; Steve Zabriskie; Bud Harrelson	
1984	WOR-TV; SportsChannel New York	Ralph Kiner	Tim McCarver	Steve Zabriskie; Fran Healy	Ralph Kiner; Tim McCarver; Fran Healy	
1985	WOR-TV; SportsChannel New York	Ralph Kiner	Tim McCarver	Steve Zabriskie; Fran Healy	Ralph Kiner; Tim McCarver; Fran Healy	
1986	WOR-TV; SportsChannel New York	Ralph Kiner	Tim McCarver	Steve Zabriskie; Fran Healy	Ralph Kiner; Tim McCarver; Fran Healy; Rusty Staub	
1987	(W)WOR-TV; SportsChannel New York	Ralph Kiner	Tim McCarver	Steve Zabriskie; Fran Healy	Ralph Kiner; Tim McCarver; Fran Healy; Rusty Staub	
1988	WWOR-TV; SportsChannel New York	Ralph Kiner	Tim McCarver	Steve Zabriskie; Fran Healy	Ralph Kiner; Tim McCarver; Fran Healy; Rusty Staub	
1989	WWOR-TV; SportsChannel New York	Ralph Kiner	Tim McCarver	Steve Zabriskie; Fran Healy	Ralph Kiner; Tim McCarver; Fran Healy; Rusty Staub	
1990	WWOR-TV; SportsChannel New York	Ralph Kiner	Tim McCarver	Fran Healy	Ralph Kiner; Tim McCarver; Fran Healy; Rusty Staub	
1991	WWOR-TV; SportsChannel New York	Ralph Kiner	Tim McCarver	Don Criqui; Fran Healy	Ralph Kiner; Tim McCarver; Fran Healy; Rusty Staub	
1992	WWOR-TV; SportsChannel New York	Ralph Kiner	Tim McCarver	Bob Carpenter; Fran Healy	Ralph Kiner; Tim McCarver; Fran Healy; Rusty Staub	
1993	WWOR-TV; SportsChannel New York	Ralph Kiner	Tim McCarver	Fran Healy	Ralph Kiner; Tim McCarver; Fran Healy; Rusty Staub	
1994	WWOR-TV; SportsChannel New York	Ralph Kiner	Tim McCarver	Gary Thorne; Fran Healy	Ralph Kiner; Tim McCarver; Fran Healy; Rusty Staub	
1995	WWOR-TV; SportsChannel New York	Ralph Kiner	Tim McCarver	Gary Thorne; Fran Healy	Ralph Kiner; Tim McCarver; Fran Healy; Rusty Staub	
1996	WWOR-TV; SportsChannel New York	Gary Thorne; Howie Rose	Ralph Kiner; Fran Healy		Ralph Kiner; Tim McCarver; Fran Healy	Matt Loughlin
1997	WWOR-TV; SportsChannel New York	Gary Thorne; Howie Rose	Ralph Kiner; Fran Healy		Ralph Kiner; Tim McCarver; Fran Healy	Matt Loughlin
1998	WWOR-TV; Fox Sports New York	Gary Thorne; Howie Rose	Ralph Kiner; Fran Healy	Mike Crispino	Ralph Kiner; Keith Hernandez; Tim McCarver; Fran Healy	Matt Loughlin; Mike Crispino
1999	Fox Sports New York; WPIX	Gary Thorne; Howie Rose	Ralph Kiner; Fran Healy	Mike Crispino	Tom Seaver; Keith Hernandez; Ralph Kiner; Fran Healy	Matt Loughlin; Mike Crispino; Sean Kimerling
2000	Fox Sports Net New York; WPIX	Gary Thorne; Howie Rose	Ralph Kiner; Fran Healy	Mike Crispino	Tom Seaver; Keith Hernandez; Ralph Kiner; Fran Healy	Matt Loughlin; Mike Crispino; Sean Kimerling
2001	Fox Sports Net New York; WPIX	Howie Rose; Gary Thorne	Ralph Kiner	Fran Healy; Mike Crispino	Ralph Kiner; Keith Hernandez; Fran Healy; Tom Seaver	Matt Loughlin; Mike Crispino; Sean Kimerling
2002	Fox Sports Net New York; MSG Network; WPIX	Howie Rose; Gary Thorne	Ralph Kiner	Fran Healy	Ralph Kiner; Fran Healy; Keith Hernandez; Tom Seaver; Ted Robinson	Matt Loughlin; Bill Daughtry; Sean Kimerling
2003	Fox Sports Net New York; MSG Network; WPIX	Howie Rose; Ted Robinson Matt Loughlin; Dave O'Brien	Ralph Kiner	Fran Healy	Keith Hernandez; Ralph Kiner; Fran Healy; Tom Seaver	Matt Loughlin; Bill Daughtry; Sean Kimerling; Kip Lewis
2004	FSN New York; MSG Network; WPIX	Ted Robinson; Matt Loughlin; Dave O'Brien	Ralph Kiner	Fran Healy	Keith Hernandez; Ralph Kiner; Fran Healy; Tom Seaver	Matt Loughlin; Bill Daughtry; Kip Lewis
2005	FSN New York; MSG Network; WPIX	Ted Robinson; Matt Loughlin; Dave O'Brien	Ralph Kiner	Fran Healy	Keith Hernandez; Ralph Kiner; Fran Healy; Tom Seaver	Matt Loughlin; Bill Daughtry; Kip Lewis
2006	SportsNet New York; WPIX	Gary Cohen	Steve Berthiaume	Howie Rose	Ron Darling; Keith Hernandez; Ralph Kiner	Chris Cotter
2007	SportsNet New York; WPIX	Gary Cohen			Ron Darling; Keith Hernandez; Ralph Kiner	Kevin Burkhardt
2008	SportsNet New York; WPIX	Gary Cohen			Ron Darling; Keith Hernandez; Ralph Kiner	Kevin Burkhardt
2009	SportsNet New York; WPIX	Gary Cohen			Ron Darling; Keith Hernandez; Ralph Kiner	Kevin Burkhardt
2010	SportsNet New York; WPIX	Gary Cohen			Ron Darling; Keith Hernandez; Ralph Kiner	Kevin Burkhardt
2011	SportsNet New York; WPIX	Gary Cohen	Kevin Burkhardt		Ron Darling; Keith Hernandez; Ralph Kiner	Kevin Burkhardt; Tiffany Simons
2012	SportsNet New York; WPIX	Gary Cohen	Kevin Burkhardt		Ron Darling; Keith Hernandez; Ralph Kiner	Kevin Burkhardt; Tiffany Simons
2013	SportsNet New York; WPIX	Gary Cohen	Kevin Burkhardt		Ron Darling; Keith Hernandez; Ralph Kiner	Kevin Burkhardt; Steve Gelbs
2014	SportsNet New York; WPIX	Gary Cohen	Kevin Burkhardt		Ron Darling; Keith Hernandez	Kevin Burkhardt; Steve Gelbs
2015	SportsNet New York; WPIX	Gary Cohen	Gary Apple	Scott Braun	Ron Darling; Keith Hernandez	Steve Gelbs; Alexa Datt
2016	SportsNet New York; WPIX	Gary Cohen	Gary Apple		Ron Darling; Keith Hernandez	Steve Gelbs; Alexa Datt
2017	SportsNet New York; WPIX	Gary Cohen	Gary Apple	Wayne Randazzo	Ron Darling; Keith Hernandez	Steve Gelbs; Alexa Datt
2018	SportsNet New York; WPIX	Gary Cohen	Gary Apple	Wayne Randazzo	Ron Darling; Keith Hernandez	Steve Gelbs; Doug Williams; Justine Ward
2019	SportsNet New York; WPIX	Gary Cohen	Gary Apple	Wayne Randazzo	Ron Darling; Keith Hernandez; Todd Zeile	Steve Gelbs; Justine Ward
2020	SportsNet New York; WPIX	Gary Cohen	Wayne Randazzo		Ron Darling; Keith Hernandez; Todd Zeile	Steve Gelbs
2021	SportsNet New York; WPIX	Gary Cohen	Wayne Randazzo	Gary Thorne	Ron Darling; Keith Hernandez; Todd Zeile; Anthony Recker	Steve Gelbs; Michelle Margaux
2022	SportsNet New York; WPIX	Gary Cohen	Wayne Randazzo		Ron Darling; Keith Hernandez; Todd Zeile; Jerry Blevins	Steve Gelbs; Michelle Margaux
2023	SportsNet New York; WPIX	Gary Cohen	Steve Gelbs		Ron Darling; Keith Hernandez; Todd Zeile; Jerry Blevins	Steve Gelbs; Michelle Margaux
2024	SportsNet New York; WPIX	Gary Cohen	Steve Gelbs		Ron Darling; Keith Hernandez; Todd Zeile; Jerry Blevins; Daniel Murphy	Steve Gelbs; Michelle Margaux; Niki Lattarulo
2025	SportsNet New York; WPIX	Gary Cohen	Steve Gelbs		Ron Darling; Keith Hernandez; Todd Zeile; Jerry Blevins; Daniel Murphy	Steve Gelbs; Michelle Margaux; Niki Lattarulo
2026	SportsNet New York; WPIX	Gary Cohen	Steve Gelbs		Ron Darling; Keith Hernandez; Todd Zeile; Jerry Blevins; Daniel Murphy	Steve Gelbs; Michelle Margaux; Niki Lattarulo; Laura Albanese
2027	SportsNet New York; WPIX	Gary Cohen	Steve Gelbs		Ron Darling; Keith Hernandez; Todd Zeile	Steve Gelbs Michelle Margaux

=== Radio ===
==== English ====
- WCBS (WHSQ after August 26, 2024) 880 AM (2019–)
- WOR 710 AM (2014–2018)
- WFAN-FM 101.9 FM (2013)
- WFAN 1050 AM (1987–October 7, 1988); 660 AM (October 7, 1988 – 2013)
- WHN 1050 AM (1983–1987)
- WMCA 570 AM (1978–1982)
- WNEW 1130 AM (1975–1977)
- WHN 1050 AM (1972–1974)
- WJRZ (WWDJ after May 16, 1971) 970 AM (1967–1971)
- WHN 1050 AM (1964–1966)
- WABC 770 AM (1962–1963)

==== Spanish ====
- WINS-FM 92.3 HD2 (2024–)
- WEPN 1050 AM (2013–2023)
- WQBU-FM 92.7 FM (2010–2012)
- WADO 1280 AM (1994–2009)

=== Radio Broadcasters by Year ===
Year	Flagship Station	Play-by-play #1	Play-by-play #2	Play-by-play #3/Host	Analyst
1962	WABC	Lindsey Nelson	Bob Murphy	Ralph Kiner	
1963	WABC	Lindsey Nelson	Bob Murphy	Ralph Kiner	
1964	WHN	Lindsey Nelson	Bob Murphy	Ralph Kiner	
1965	WHN	Lindsey Nelson	Bob Murphy	Ralph Kiner	
1966	WHN	Lindsey Nelson	Bob Murphy	Ralph Kiner	
1967	WJRZ	Lindsey Nelson	Bob Murphy	Ralph Kiner	
1968	WJRZ; WGLI	Lindsey Nelson	Bob Murphy	Ralph Kiner	
1969	WJRZ; WGLI; WABC-FM	Lindsey Nelson	Bob Murphy	Ralph Kiner	
1970	WJRZ; WNBC-FM	Lindsey Nelson	Bob Murphy	Ralph Kiner	
1971	WJRZ (WWDJ); WNBC-FM	Lindsey Nelson	Bob Murphy	Ralph Kiner	
1972	WHN	Lindsey Nelson	Bob Murphy	Ralph Kiner	
1973	WHN	Lindsey Nelson	Bob Murphy	Ralph Kiner	
1974	WHN	Lindsey Nelson	Bob Murphy	Ralph Kiner	
1975	WNEW	Lindsey Nelson	Bob Murphy	Ralph Kiner	
1976	WNEW	Lindsey Nelson	Bob Murphy	Ralph Kiner	
1977	WNEW; WNYC	Lindsey Nelson	Bob Murphy	Ralph Kiner	
1978	WMCA	Lindsey Nelson	Bob Murphy	Ralph Kiner	
1979	WMCA	Bob Murphy	Ralph Kiner	Steve Albert	
1980	WMCA	Bob Murphy	Ralph Kiner	Steve Albert	
1981	WMCA	Bob Murphy	Ralph Kiner	Steve Albert	Art Shamsky
1982	WMCA	Bob Murphy	Steve LaMar		
1983	WHN	Bob Murphy	Steve LaMar		
1984	WHN	Bob Murphy	Steve LaMar		
1985	WHN	Bob Murphy	Gary Thorne		
1986	WHN	Bob Murphy	Gary Thorne		
1987	WHN/WFAN	Bob Murphy	Gary Thorne		
1988	WFAN	Bob Murphy	Gary Thorne	Charlie Slowes	
1989	WFAN	Bob Murphy	Gary Cohen		
1990	WFAN	Bob Murphy	Gary Cohen		
1991	WFAN	Bob Murphy	Gary Cohen	Charlie Slowes	
1992	WFAN	Bob Murphy	Gary Cohen	Todd Kalas	
1993	WFAN	Bob Murphy	Gary Cohen	Todd Kalas	
1994	WFAN	Bob Murphy	Gary Cohen	Howie Rose	
1995	WFAN	Bob Murphy	Gary Cohen	Howie Rose	
1996	WFAN	Bob Murphy	Gary Cohen	Ed Coleman	
1997	WFAN	Bob Murphy	Gary Cohen	Ed Coleman	
1998	WFAN	Bob Murphy	Gary Cohen	Ed Coleman	
1999	WFAN	Bob Murphy	Gary Cohen	Ed Coleman	
2000	WFAN	Bob Murphy	Gary Cohen	Ed Coleman	
2001	WFAN	Bob Murphy	Gary Cohen	Ed Coleman	
2002	WFAN	Bob Murphy	Gary Cohen	Ted Robinson; Ed Coleman	
2003	WFAN	Bob Murphy	Gary Cohen	Ted Robinson; Ed Coleman	
2004	WFAN	Gary Cohen	Howie Rose	Ed Coleman	
2005	WFAN	Gary Cohen	Howie Rose	Ed Coleman	
2006	WFAN	Howie Rose	Tom McCarthy	Ed Coleman	
2007	WFAN	Howie Rose	Tom McCarthy	Ed Coleman	
2008	WFAN	Howie Rose	Wayne Hagin	Ed Coleman	
2009	WFAN	Howie Rose	Wayne Hagin	Ed Coleman	
2010	WFAN	Howie Rose	Wayne Hagin	Ed Coleman	
2011	WFAN	Howie Rose	Wayne Hagin	Ed Coleman	
2012	WFAN	Howie Rose	Josh Lewin	Ed Coleman	
2013	WFAN/WFAN-FM	Howie Rose	Josh Lewin	Ed Coleman	
2014	WOR	Howie Rose	Josh Lewin	Seth Everett	
2015	WOR	Howie Rose	Josh Lewin	Wayne Randazzo	
2016	WOR	Howie Rose	Josh Lewin	Wayne Randazzo	
2017	WOR	Howie Rose	Josh Lewin	Wayne Randazzo	
2018	WOR	Howie Rose	Josh Lewin	Wayne Randazzo	
2019	WCBS	Howie Rose	Wayne Randazzo	John Sadak; Ed Coleman; Brad Heller	
2020	WCBS	Howie Rose	Wayne Randazzo	Ed Coleman; Brad Heller	
2021	WCBS	Howie Rose	Wayne Randazzo	Ed Coleman; Brad Heller; Gregg Caserta	Anthony Recker; Terry Collins; Jerry Blevins; Lee Mazzilli
2022	WCBS	Howie Rose	Wayne Randazzo	Jake Eisenberg; Ed Coleman; Brad HellerGary Thorne; Brendan Burke	Lee Mazzilli Terry Collins
2023	WCBS	Howie Rose	Keith Raad	Patrick McCarthy	
2024	WCBS/WHSQ	Howie Rose	Keith Raad	Patrick McCarthy	
2025	WHSQ	Howie Rose	Keith Raad	Patrick McCarthy	Anthony Recker
2026	WHSQ	Howie Rose	Keith Raad	Patrick McCarthy	
2027	WHSQ	Keith Raad	Patrick McCarthy		

== Broadcasters ==
=== Current ===
- Gary Cohen: Radio (1989–2005), TV, play by play (2006–)
- Keith Hernandez: TV, color (1998–)
- Max Perez-Jimenez: Spanish Radio (2005-)
- Ron Darling: TV, color (2006–)
- Gary Apple: TV, studio host (2006–)
- Jim Duquette: Radio/TV, studio analyst (2012–)
- Nestor Rosario: Spanish Radio (2011-)
- Steve Gelbs: TV, sideline reporter, fill-in studio host (2014-)
- Todd Zeile: TV, analyst (2016-)
- Johnny Trujillo: Spanish Radio (2020-)
- Michelle Margaux: TV, studio host, sideline reporter (2021-)
- Terry Collins: Radio/TV, analyst (2021-)
- Jerry Blevins: Radio/TV, analyst (2021-)
- Keith Raad: Radio (2023-)
- Chelsea Sherrod: TV, studio host (2023-)
- Patrick McCarthy: Radio (2023-)
- Daniel Murphy: TV, analyst (2024-)
- Jose Reyes: TV, analyst (2025-)
- Chelsea Janes: TV, MLB insider (2027-)

=== Former ===
- Lindsey Nelson: Radio/TV (1962–1978)
- Buck Canel: Spanish Radio (1970-1979)
- Steve Albert: Radio/TV (1979–1981)
- Bob Goldsholl:TV (1980)
- Art Shamsky: Radio/TV (1981)
- Lorn Brown: TV (1982)
- Jiggs McDonald: TV (1982)
- Steve LaMar: Radio (1982–1984)
- Billy Berroa: WEPN Spanish Radio (1982–2007)
- Bud Harrelson: TV (1983)
- Steve Zabriskie: TV (1983–1989)
- Tim McCarver: TV (1983–1998)
- Don Criqui: TV (1991)
- Rusty Staub: TV (1986–1995)
- Bob Carpenter: TV (1992–1993)
- Todd Kalas: Radio(1992–1993)
- Renato Morffi: Spanish Radio (1990–1995)
- Armando Talavera:Spanish Radio (1989,1992-1993)
- Mike Crispino: TV (1999–2001)
- Sean Kimerling: V (1999-2003)
- Clemson Smith-Ruiz:TV (2003)
- Bob Murphy: TV (1962–1981); Radio (1962–2003)
- Matt Loughlin: TV, Pregame Host/Sideline Reporter (1996–2005)
- Tom Seaver: TV (1999–2005)
- Ted Robinson: Radio (2002–2003), TV (2002–2005)
- Dave O'Brien: TV (2003–2005)
- Fran Healy: TV, (1984–2005)
- Bill Daughtry: TV, Sideline Reporter (2002-2005)
- Kip Lewis:TV, Sideline Reporter (2003-2005)
- Chris Cotter: TV, Sideline Reporter, Studio Host (2006-2007)
- Tom McCarthy: Radio (2006–2007)
- Dave Gallagher: TV, Studio Analyst (2007)
- Matt Yallof: TV, Studio Host (2006–2008)
- Kevin Berkhardt: TV, Sideline Reporter (2007-2014)
- Harold Reynolds: TV, Studio Analyst (2008)
- Darryl Strawberry: TV, Studio Analyst (2008-2009)
- Dwight Gooden: TV, Studio Analyst (2010)
- Wayne Hagin: Radio (2008–2011)
- Tiffany Simmons TV:Sideline Reporter (2011-2012)
- Chris Carlin: TV, Studio Host (2009–2013)
- CJ Pappa: TV:Sideline Reporter (2012-2013)
- Ralph Kiner: Radio (1962–1981), TV (1962–2013)
- Bob Ojeda: TV, Studio analyst (2009–2014)
- Seth Everett:Radio (2014)
- Cliff Floyd: TV, Studio analyst (2015)
- Scott Braun: TV (2015-2017)
- Alexa Datt: TV, Sideline reporter (2015-2017)
- Bobby Valentine: TV, studio analyst (2015-2017)
- Josh Lewin: Radio (2012–2018)
- John Franco: TV, Studio analyst (2015-2018)
- Jon Heyman: TV, MLB Insider (2008-2018)
- Nelson Figueroa: TV, Studio analyst (2015-2019)
- Justine Ward:TV, sideline reporter (2018-2019)
- John Sadak: Radio (2019)
- Juan Alicea: WEPN Spanish Radio (1982–2019)
- Jonas Schwartz:TV, studio host (2009-2020)
- Doug Williams:TV, studio host/sideline reporter (2016-2021)
- Gregg Caserta: Radio (2021)
- Ed Coleman: Radio (1996–2013, 2019-2022)
- Jake Eisenberg:Radio (2022)
- Chris Williamson:TV, studio host (2022)
- Wayne Randazzo: Radio, TV (2015-2022)
- Brendan Burke: Radio (2022)
- Gary Thorne: Radio (1985–1988, 2022), TV (1994–2002, 2021)
- Brad Heller: Radio (2019-2022)
- Lee Mazzilli: Radio/TV, Studio Analyst/Analyst (2007–2008, 2021-2022)
- Andy Martino: TV, MLB Insider (2014-2025)
- Anthony Recker: TV/Radio, studio analyst/analyst (2020-2021, 2025)
- Howie Rose: Radio (1994–1995, 2003–2026), TV (1996–2003, 2006)
- Eamon McAnaney: TV, studio analyst (2016-2026)
- Anthony DiComo:TV, studio analyst (2026)
- Laura Albanese:TV, sideline reporter/studio analyst (2026)
- Anthony McCarron:TV, studio host (2024-2026)
- Nikki Lattarulo: TV, studio host, field reporter (2024-2026)
- John Harper:TV, MLB Insider (2019-2026)

== See also ==
- List of current Major League Baseball announcers
