= List of National League Championship Series broadcasters =

The following is a list of the national television and radio networks and announcers that have broadcast National League Championship Series games over the years. It does not include any announcers who may have appeared on local broadcasts produced by the participating teams.

== National television ==
=== 2020s ===
| Year | Network | Play-by-play | Color commentator(s) | Field reporter(s) | Pregame host | Pregame analysts | Trophy presentation |
|---|---|---|---|---|---|---|---|
| 2026 | Fox/Fox One (Games 1 and 2) | Joe Davis | John Smoltz | Ken Rosenthal and Tom Verducci | Matt Vasgersian (Game 1); Kevin Burkhardt (Games 2–4) | Alex Rodriguez, David Ortiz, and Derek Jeter | Kevin Burkhardt |
| 2026 | FS1/Fox One (Games 2–4) | Joe Davis | John Smoltz | Ken Rosenthal and Tom Verducci | Matt Vasgersian (Game 1); Kevin Burkhardt (Games 2–4) | Alex Rodriguez, David Ortiz, and Derek Jeter | Kevin Burkhardt |
| 2025 | TBS/TruTV/HBO Max | Brian Anderson | Ron Darling and Jeff Francoeur | Lauren Shehadi | Adam Lefkoe | Jimmy Rollins, Pedro Martínez, and Curtis Granderson | Lauren Shehadi |
| 2024 | Fox (Games 1–2) | Joe Davis | John Smoltz | Ken Rosenthal and Tom Verducci | Matt Vasgersian (Games 1, 6); Kevin Burkhardt (Games 2–5) | Alex Rodriguez, David Ortiz, and Derek Jeter | Tom Verducci |
| 2024 | FS1 (Games 2–6) | Joe Davis | John Smoltz | Ken Rosenthal and Tom Verducci | Matt Vasgersian (Games 1, 6); Kevin Burkhardt (Games 2–5) | Alex Rodriguez, David Ortiz, and Derek Jeter | Tom Verducci |
| 2023 | TBS/Max | Brian Anderson | Ron Darling and Jeff Francoeur | Matt Winer | Lauren Shehadi | Jimmy Rollins, Pedro Martínez, Curtis Granderson, and Albert Pujols (Games 1–2) | Matt Winer |
| 2023 | TruTV (AltCast) | Alanna Rizzo | Pedro Martínez (Games 1–4, 6–7), Albert Pujols (Games 1–2, 4–7), Nestor Cortés (Games 1–3, 6–7), Yonder Alonso (Games 1–3), Enrique Hernández (Games 1–2), Iván Rodríguez (Game 3), Patrick Sandoval (Games 4–5), and Rubén Amaro Jr. (Game 5) | —N/a | Lauren Shehadi | Jimmy Rollins, Pedro Martínez, Curtis Granderson, and Albert Pujols (Games 1–2) | Matt Winer |
| 2022 | FS1 (Games 1–3, 5) | Joe Davis | John Smoltz | Ken Rosenthal and Tom Verducci | Kevin Burkhardt (Games 1–4); Matt Vasgersian (Game 5) | Alex Rodriguez, David Ortiz, and Frank Thomas | Tom Verducci |
| 2022 | Fox (Games 2, 4) | Joe Davis | John Smoltz | Ken Rosenthal and Tom Verducci | Kevin Burkhardt (Games 1–4); Matt Vasgersian (Game 5) | Alex Rodriguez, David Ortiz, and Frank Thomas | Tom Verducci |
| 2021 | TBS | Brian Anderson | Ron Darling and Jeff Francoeur | Lauren Shehadi | Bob Costas | Jimmy Rollins, Pedro Martínez, and Curtis Granderson | Lauren Shehadi |
| 2020 | Fox (Games 1, 4, 7) | Joe Buck (Games 1–6); Joe Davis (Game 7) | John Smoltz | Ken Rosenthal and Tom Verducci | Kevin Burkhardt | Alex Rodriguez, David Ortiz, and Frank Thomas | Tom Verducci |
| 2020 | FS1 (Games 2–7) | Joe Buck (Games 1–6); Joe Davis (Game 7) | John Smoltz | Ken Rosenthal and Tom Verducci | Kevin Burkhardt | Alex Rodriguez, David Ortiz, and Frank Thomas | Tom Verducci |

==== Notes ====
- Beginning in 2022, the new seven-year Major League Baseball television contract called for both Fox network and FS1 to air more post-season games (two Divisional Series and one best-of-7 League Championship Series) while keeping the regular season structure intact. The deal saw Fox continue to air the All-Star Game and World Series exclusively. However, Fox has expanded digital rights, and will air at least two of the first four League Championship Series games and all seventh games in its league from 2020 to 2028. Also, TBS will air Tuesday Night Baseball for the duration of the contract.
- 2020 – Joe Davis called play-by-play for Game 7 due to Joe Buck calling the Tampa Bay Buccaneers-Green Bay Packers NFL game for Fox.
- 2021 – Bob Costas took over for Ernie Johnson as pregame host for TBS due to Johnson's Inside the NBA duties for TNT.
- 2022 – Matt Vasgersian filled in for Kevin Burkhardt as pregame host for Game 5 due to Burkhardt calling the Kansas City Chiefs–San Francisco 49ers NFL game for Fox. Vasgersian also filled in for Burkhardt on the postgame show after Game 4 the night before.
- 2024 – Matt Vasgersian filled in for Kevin Burkhardt as pregame host for Games 1 and 6 due to Burkhardt calling the Week 6 Detroit Lions–Dallas Cowboys and Week 7 Kansas City Chiefs–San Francisco 49ers NFL games for Fox.
- 2026 – Matt Vasgersian filled in for Kevin Burkhardt as pregame host for Game 1 due to Burkhardt calling the Week 5 San Francisco 49ers–Seattle Seahawks NFL game for Fox.

=== 2010s ===
| Year | Network | Play-by-play | Color commentator(s) | Field reporter(s) | Pregame hosts | Pregame analysts | Trophy presentation |
|---|---|---|---|---|---|---|---|
| 2019 | TBS | Brian Anderson | Ron Darling and Jeff Francoeur | Lauren Shehadi | Casey Stern | Gary Sheffield, Pedro Martínez, Jimmy Rollins, and Curtis Granderson | Brian Anderson |
| 2018 | FS1 (Games 1, 3–7) | Joe Buck | John Smoltz | Ken Rosenthal and Tom Verducci | Kevin Burkhardt | Alex Rodriguez, David Ortiz, and Frank Thomas | Tom Verducci |
| 2018 | Fox (Game 2) | Joe Buck | John Smoltz | Ken Rosenthal and Tom Verducci | Kevin Burkhardt | Alex Rodriguez, David Ortiz, and Frank Thomas | Tom Verducci |
| 2017 | TBS | Brian Anderson | Ron Darling | Sam Ryan | Casey Stern | Gary Sheffield, Pedro Martínez, Jimmy Rollins, and Ryan Howard (Games 4–5) | Brian Anderson |
| 2016 | FS1 | Joe Buck | John Smoltz | Ken Rosenthal and Tom Verducci | Kevin Burkhardt | Alex Rodriguez, Pete Rose, Frank Thomas, and Tom Verducci (in Chicago) | Kevin Burkhardt |
| 2015 | TBS | Ernie Johnson | Ron Darling and Cal Ripken | Matt Winer and Sam Ryan | Casey Stern | Gary Sheffield, Pedro Martínez, and Dusty Baker | Ernie Johnson |
| 2014 | Fox (Game 1) | Joe Buck | Harold Reynolds and Tom Verducci | Ken Rosenthal and Erin Andrews | Kevin Burkhardt | C. J. Nitkowski, Eric Karros, Gabe Kapler, and Frank Thomas | Erin Andrews |
| 2014 | FS1 (Games 2–5) | Joe Buck | Harold Reynolds and Tom Verducci | Ken Rosenthal and Erin Andrews | Kevin Burkhardt | C. J. Nitkowski, Eric Karros, Gabe Kapler, and Frank Thomas | Erin Andrews |
| 2013 | TBS | Ernie Johnson | Ron Darling and Cal Ripken | Craig Sager | Keith Olbermann | Tom Verducci, Pedro Martínez, and Gary Sheffield | Ernie Johnson |
| 2012 | Fox | Joe Buck | Tim McCarver | Ken Rosenthal; Erin Andrews (Games 1–4, 6–7); Chris Myers (Game 5) | Matt Vasgersian | Harold Reynolds, Eric Karros, and A. J. Pierzynski | Erin Andrews |
| 2011 | TBS | Brian Anderson | Ron Darling and John Smoltz | Craig Sager | Matt Winer | David Wells, Cal Ripken, and Dennis Eckersley | Matt Winer |
| 2010 | Fox | Joe Buck | Tim McCarver | Ken Rosenthal | Chris Rose | Eric Karros and Mitch Williams | Chris Rose |

==== Notes ====
- The 2010 NLCS did not air in some Philadelphia-area homes after Cablevision pulled local Fox station WTXF off its lineup on October 16 as the result of a carriage dispute with News Corporation, Fox's parent company.
- Brian Anderson took over for Ernie Johnson as the lead play-by-play man for TBS during the 2011 postseason because Johnson had to care for his son Michael (who suffered from Muscular dystrophy and was placed in intensive care around the same time as the playoffs). His son died 10 years later at 33.
- Nielsen ratings for Game 7 of the 2012 NLCS between the San Francisco Giants and St. Louis Cardinals showed that 31.8% of households in the St. Louis area watched the game compared with 27.5 in the San Francisco Bay Area. Nationally, Nielsen found that 8.1 million viewers saw this game, a 4.9% share of households. The rating peaked at 5.8 at 7:30 p.m. (Central Time Zone) before declining as viewers switched to Monday Night Football or the presidential debate.
- Beginning in 2014, when Fox Sports began a new television contract with Major League Baseball, FS1 airs 40 regular season MLB games (mostly on Saturdays), along with up to 15 post-season games (eight Divisional Series games and one best-of-7 League Championship Series). The deal resulted in a reduction of MLB coverage on the Fox network, which will air 12 regular season games, the All-Star Game, and the World Series.
  - Game 1 of the 2014 NLCS was simulcast on Fox Sports 1 and hosted by Kevin Burkhardt, Gabe Kapler and C. J. Nitkowski, who offered sabermetric analysis of the game.
- 2017 – Anderson again took over for Johnson as the NLCS play-by-play announcer for TBS, this time because of Johnson's Inside the NBA duties for TNT.

=== 2000s ===
| Year | Network | Play-by-play | Color commentator(s) | Field reporter(s) | Pregame hosts | Pregame analysts | Trophy presentation |
|---|---|---|---|---|---|---|---|
| 2009 | TBS | Chip Caray | Ron Darling and Buck Martinez | Craig Sager | Ernie Johnson | David Wells, Cal Ripken, and Dennis Eckersley | Ernie Johnson |
| 2008 | Fox | Joe Buck | Tim McCarver | Ken Rosenthal and Chris Myers | Jeanne Zelasko | Kevin Kennedy, Mark Grace, and Eric Karros | Chris Myers |
| 2007 | TBS | Chip Caray | Tony Gwynn and Bob Brenly | Craig Sager and José Mota | Ernie Johnson | Frank Thomas, Cal Ripken, and Ron Darling | Ernie Johnson |
| 2006 | Fox | Joe Buck | Tim McCarver and Luis González | Ken Rosenthal | Jeanne Zelasko | Kevin Kennedy and A. J. Pierzynski | Kenny Albert |
| 2005 | Fox | Thom Brennaman | Steve Lyons and Bob Brenly | Chris Myers, Patrick O'Neal, and Kenny Albert | Jeanne Zelasko | Kevin Kennedy | Steve Lyons |
| 2004 | Fox | Thom Brennaman | Steve Lyons and Bob Brenly | Chris Myers and Josh Lewin | Jeanne Zelasko | Kevin Kennedy | Steve Lyons |
| 2003 | Fox | Thom Brennaman | Steve Lyons and Al Leiter | Josh Lewin | Jeanne Zelasko | Kevin Kennedy | Steve Lyons |
| 2002 | Fox | Joe Buck | Tim McCarver | —N/a | Jeanne Zelasko | Kevin Kennedy | Tim McCarver |
| 2001 | Fox | Joe Buck (in Arizona); Thom Brennaman (in Atlanta) | Tim McCarver (in Arizona); Steve Lyons (in Atlanta) | —N/a | Jeanne Zelasko | Kevin Kennedy | Steve Lyons |
| 2000 | Fox | Joe Buck | Tim McCarver and Bob Brenly | Bob Brenly | Keith Olbermann | Kevin Kennedy | Keith Olbermann |

==== Notes ====
- In 2001, Game 5 of the NLCS and Game 4 of the ALCS were split between Fox and Fox Sports Net. This came off the heels of Fox airing an NFL doubleheader that particular day (October 21).
- In 2002, Game 1 of the NLCS and Game 2 of the ALCS were split between Fox and Fox Sports Net. The regional split was done in order for Fox to avoid televising a weekday afternoon game.
- In 2003, Game 1 of the ALCS and Game 2 of the NLCS were split between Fox and FX.
- In 2004, Game 1 of the NLCS and Game 2 of the ALCS were split between Fox and Fox Sports Net. Also in 2004, Game 5 of the ALCS ran way into the time slot of Game 5 of the NLCS. As a result, the first seven innings of the NLCS game were shown on FX, except in the home markets of the teams competing in the NLCS, which saw the conclusion of the ALCS on FX and the NLCS on Fox.
- In 2005, Game 1 of the NLCS and Game 2 of the ALCS were split between Fox and FX.
- The 2007 NLCS on TBS marked the first time that a League Championship Series was exclusively broadcast on a cable television network.

=== 1990s ===
| Year | Network | Play-by-play | Color commentator(s) | Field reporter(s) |
|---|---|---|---|---|
| 1999 | NBC | Bob Costas | Joe Morgan | Jim Gray and Craig Sager |
| 1998 | Fox | Joe Buck | Tim McCarver and Bob Brenly | |
| 1997 | NBC | Bob Costas | Joe Morgan and Bob Uecker | Jim Gray |
| 1996 | Fox | Joe Buck | Tim McCarver and Bob Brenly | |
| 1995 | ABC (in Cincinnati) | Al Michaels | Jim Palmer and Tim McCarver | Lesley Visser |
| 1995 | NBC (in Atlanta) | Greg Gumbel | Joe Morgan | Johnny Bench |
| 1993 | CBS | Sean McDonough | Tim McCarver | Jim Gray |
| 1992 | CBS | Sean McDonough | Tim McCarver | Jim Gray |
| 1991 | CBS | Jack Buck | Tim McCarver | Andrea Joyce |
| 1990 | CBS | Jack Buck | Tim McCarver | James Brown |

==== Notes ====
- The 1990 postseason started on a Thursday, while World Series started on a Tuesday due to the brief lockout.
  - In 1990, Major League Baseball and CBS went with some rather unconventional scheduling during the LCS round, with two consecutive scheduled off-days in the NLCS after Game 2.
- In 1991, CBS didn't come on the air for baseball for weeknight LCS telecasts until 8:30 p.m. ET. Instead, they opted to show programming such as Rescue 911 at 8 p.m. rather than a baseball pregame show.
- The 1994 National League Championship Series was planned to air on NBC. However, those plans were scrapped when a strike caused the entire postseason to be cancelled.
- The rather messy 1995 arrangement was courtesy of "The Baseball Network", which was Major League Baseball's in-house production facility. ABC and NBC (who essentially, distributed the telecasts rather than produce them by themselves like in the past) shared the same on-air graphics and even the microphone "flags" had the "Baseball Network" logo on it with the respective network logo. In addition, the first four games of both of the 1995 League Championship Series were regionally televised.

=== 1980s ===
| Year | Network | Play-by-play | Color commentator(s) |
|---|---|---|---|
| 1989 | NBC | Vin Scully (Games 1, 3–5); Bob Costas (Game 2) | Tom Seaver |
| 1988 | ABC | Al Michaels | Jim Palmer and Tim McCarver |
| 1987 | NBC | Vin Scully | Joe Garagiola |
| 1986 | ABC | Keith Jackson | Tim McCarver |
| 1985 | NBC | Vin Scully | Joe Garagiola |
| 1984 | ABC | Don Drysdale | Earl Weaver and Reggie Jackson |
| 1983 | NBC | Vin Scully | Joe Garagiola |
| 1982 | ABC | Al Michaels | Tommy Lasorda; Howard Cosell (Games 1, 3) |
| 1981 | NBC | Dick Enberg | Tom Seaver |
| 1980 | ABC | Keith Jackson | Don Drysdale and Howard Cosell |

==== Notes ====
- On October 11, 1980, Keith Jackson called an Oklahoma vs. Texas college football game for ABC in the afternoon, then flew to Houston, Texas to call Game 4 of the NLCS. In the meantime, Don Drysdale filled-in for Jackson on play-by-play for the early innings (up until the middle of the fourth inning). ABC used Steve Zabriskie as a field reporter during the 1980 NLCS.
- The 1981 NLCS between the Los Angeles Dodgers and Montreal Expos was also broadcast by the Canadian Broadcasting Corporation (CBC) with Dave Van Horne and Duke Snider announcing. This was still during a period in which the participating ballclubs were allowed to do their own local League Championship Series telecasts.
  - Even though Dick Enberg did play-by-play for the 1981 NLCS for NBC, Merle Harmon was, for the most part, NBC's backup baseball play-by-play man (serving behind Joe Garagiola, who called that year's ALCS for NBC with Tony Kubek) in 1981. Harmon's broadcast partner during this period was Ron Luciano. Bryon Day covered the postgame interviews for NBC following the Los Angeles Dodgers' victory in Game 5.
- Game 1 of the 1982 NLCS had to be played twice. In the first attempt (on October 6), the Atlanta Braves led against the St. Louis Cardinals 1–0 behind Phil Niekro. The game was three outs away becoming official when the umpire stopped it. When the rain did not subside, the game was cancelled. Game 1 began from the start the following night in a pitching match-up of Pascual Pérez for the Braves and longtime Cardinal starter Bob Forsch.
  - ABC's Howard Cosell did not broadcast Game 2 of the 1982 NLCS because of his commitment of hosting the Pittsburgh Steelers' 50th Anniversary dinner in Pittsburgh on October 9, 1982, which was broadcast live on Pittsburgh's ABC affiliate, WTAE-TV and Pittsburgh's NBC affiliate, WPXI-TV.
  - ABC's Jim Lampley interviewed the winners in the Cardinals' clubhouse after clinching the National League pennant in Game 3.
- 1983 marked the last year that the local flagship television stations for the competing teams were allowed to produce their own League Championship Series broadcasts. In 1982, Major League Baseball recognized a problem with this due to the emergence of cable superstations such as WTBS in Atlanta and WGN-TV in Chicago. When WTBS tried to petition for the right to do a "local" Braves broadcast of the 1982 NLCS, Major League Baseball got a Philadelphia federal court to ban them on the grounds that as a cable superstation, they could not have a nationwide telecast competing with ABC's.
- The rather unusual 1984 NLCS schedule (which had an off day after Game 3 rather than Game 2) allowed ABC to have a prime time game each weeknight even though Chicago's Wrigley Field did not have lights at the time (which remained the case until four years later). ABC used Tim McCarver as a field reporter during the 1984 NLCS. During the regular season, McCarver teamed with Don Drysdale on backup games while Al Michaels, Jim Palmer and Earl Weaver/Howard Cosell formed ABC's number one broadcasting team.
- On Thursday, October 10, 1985, NBC didn't come on the air for Game 2 of the NLCS until 8:30 p.m. ET to avoid disrupting The Cosby Show at 8. NBC would do the same thing for Thursday night games in subsequent postseasons. Dick Enberg hosted the 1985 NLCS pregame shows with Joe Morgan. It was Enberg who broke the news to most of the nation that Vince Coleman was injured before Game 4. NBC even aired an interview with one of the few people who actually saw the incident, a Dodger batboy.
- On October 15, 1986, Game 6 of the NLCS ran so long (lasting for 16 innings, 5 hours and 29 minutes), that it bumped up against the start time of Game 7 of the ALCS (also on ABC).
  - Jack Whitaker served as an essayist during ABC's coverage of the 1986 NLCS.
  - During Game 6 of the NLCS, ABC color commentator Tim McCarver left the booth during the bottom of the 16th, in order to cover the expected celebration in the New York Mets' clubhouse. As a result, play-by-play man Keith Jackson was on the air by himself for a short time. Eventually, McCarver rejoined the broadcast just before the end of the game, watching the action on a monitor in the Mets' clubhouse, then doing the postgame interviews with the Mets.
  - Corey McPherrin, a sports anchor with WABC (ABC's flagship station out of New York) interviewed Mike Scott when he was presented with the 1986 NLCS MVP award after Game 6.
- NBC used Don Sutton as a pre and postgame analyst for their 1987 LCS coverage. Marv Albert went back-and-forth during both 1987 LCS. He hosted the pregame for Game 1 of the NLCS with Joe Morgan, and in fact had to read the lineups to the viewing audience. There was a problem with the St. Louis P.A. feed, so he ended up reading the script from the Cardinal dugout while the players were introduced to the crowd. He then went to Minnesota the next night to host the ALCS pregame with Don Sutton. Jimmy Cefalo hosted the pregame coverage for Game 5 of the NLCS, as Marv Albert was away on a boxing assignment for NBC.
  - NBC's Jay Randolph, who was also the sports director for KSDK-TV, the NBC affiliate in St. Louis, interviewed the winners in the St. Louis Cardinals' clubhouse following their Game 7 victory. Also following Game 7, NBC's Marv Albert interviewed 1987 NLCS MVP, Jeffrey Leonard of the San Francisco Giants (to date, the last person from the losing team to win a postseason series Most Valuable Player Award, either League Championship Series or World Series).
- Game 2 of the 1988 NLCS didn't start until 10 p.m. ET due to a vice presidential debate. This is the latest ever scheduled start for an LCS game.
  - After wrapping up his play-by-play duties for ABC's coverage of the 1988 ALCS, in which the Oakland Athletics swept the Boston Red Sox in four games, Gary Bender covered the postgame interviews in the victorious Los Angeles Dodgers' clubhouse following Game 7 of the 1988 NLCS.
- NBC lead play-by-play man Vin Scully was unable to call Game 2 of the 1989 NLCS because he had come down with laryngitis. Thus, #2 play-by-play man, Bob Costas filled-in for him. Around the same time, Costas was assigned to call the American League Championship Series between Oakland and Toronto. Game 2 of the NLCS occurred on Thursday, October 5, which was an off day for the ALCS. NBC then decided to fly Costas from Toronto to Chicago to substitute for Scully on Thursday night. Afterward, Costas flew back to Toronto, where he resumed work on the ALCS the next night.
  - NBC used Mike Schmidt as a guest analyst (Marv Albert served as the pregame host) for Game 1 of the NLCS. Schmidt subsequently, did on-field reporting for the series. Schmidt also provided periodic commentary (albeit, taped prior to the playoffs) for ABC during the 1988 NLCS.

=== 1970s ===
| Year | Network | Play-by-play | Color commentator(s) |
|---|---|---|---|
| 1979 | NBC | Joe Garagiola | Tony Kubek and Don Sutton |
| 1978 | ABC | Al Michaels | Don Drysdale and Johnny Bench |
| 1977 | NBC | Joe Garagiola (in Los Angeles); Jim Simpson (Game 3); Dick Enberg (Game 4) | Tony Kubek (in Los Angeles); Maury Wills (Game 3); Don Drysdale (Game 4) |
| 1976 | ABC | Al Michaels | Warner Wolf and Tom Seaver |
| 1975 | NBC | Joe Garagiola (in Cincinnati); Curt Gowdy (in Pittsburgh) | Maury Wills (in Cincinnati); Tony Kubek (in Pittsburgh) |
| 1974 | NBC | Jim Simpson (Game 1); Curt Gowdy (in Los Angeles) | Maury Wills (Game 1); Tony Kubek (in Los Angeles) |
| 1973 | NBC | Curt Gowdy (in Cincinnati); Jim Simpson (in Queens, New York) | Tony Kubek (in Cincinnati); Maury Wills (in Queens, New York) |
| 1972 | NBC | Jim Simpson (Game 1); Curt Gowdy (in Cincinnati) | Sandy Koufax (Game 1); Tony Kubek (in Cincinnati) |
| 1971 | NBC | Curt Gowdy (in San Francisco); Jim Simpson (in Pittsburgh) | Tony Kubek (in San Francisco); Sandy Koufax (in Pittsburgh) |
| 1970 | NBC | Curt Gowdy (in Pittsburgh); Jim Simpson (in Cincinnati) | Tony Kubek (in Pittsburgh); Sandy Koufax (in Cincinnati) |

==== Notes ====
- In 1970, NBC televised the second games of both League Championship Series on a regional basis. Some markets got the NLCS at 1 p.m. ET along with a 4 p.m. NFL game while other markets got the ALCS at 4 p.m. along with a 1 p.m. NFL game.
- NBC did not air Game 2 of the 1972 NLCS or the 1974 NLCS.
- Except for Game 1 in both series, all games in 1975 were regionally televised. Game 3 of both League Championship Series were aired in prime time, the first time such an occurrence happened.
- 1976 marked the first time that all LCS games were televised nationally.

=== 1969 ===
| Year | Network | Play-by-play | Color commentator |
|---|---|---|---|
| 1969 | NBC | Jim Simpson (Game 1); Curt Gowdy (Games 2–3) | Sandy Koufax (Game 1); Tony Kubek (Games 2–3) |

==== Notes ====
- In the early years of the League Championship Series, NBC typically televised a doubleheader on the opening Saturday, followed by a single game on Sunday (because of NFL coverage). They then covered the weekday games with a 1.5 hour overlap, joining the second game in progress when the first one ended. NBC usually swapped announcer crews after Game 2.
- From 1969 to 1983, the Major League Baseball television contract allowed a local TV station in the market of each competing team to also carry the LCS games. So in 1969, for example, Mets fans in New York could choose to watch either the NBC telecast or Lindsey Nelson, Bob Murphy, and Ralph Kiner on WOR-TV.

=== Surviving telecasts ===
For all of the League Championship Series telecasts spanning from 1969 to 1975, only Game 2 of the 1972 American League Championship Series (Oakland vs. Detroit) is known to exist. However, the copy on the trade circuit of Game 2 of the 1972 ALCS is missing the Bert Campaneris-Lerrin LaGrow brawl. There are some instances where the only brief glimpse of telecast footage of an early LCS game can be seen in a surviving newscast from that night. For instance, the last out of the 1973 National League Championship Series as described by Jim Simpson was played on that night's NBC Nightly News, but other than that, the entire game is gone. On the day the New York Mets and Baltimore Orioles wrapped up their respective League Championship Series in 1969, a feature story on the CBS Evening News showed telecast clips of the ALCS game (there's no original sound, just voiceover narration). This is all that likely remains of anything from that third game of the Orioles-Twins series. While all telecasts of World Series games starting with 1975 are accounted for and exist, the LCS is still a spotty situation through the late 1970s:

- 1976 ALCS - Only Game 5 from the ABC vault is known to exist.
- 1976 NLCS - An off-air recording of Game 3, taped in the Portland market is the only game that is known to exist. Apparently, this copy which makes the trade circuit is the only extant version because a second-hand story says that the ABC vault copy has no sound.
- 1977 - Major League Baseball has in the vault, Game 3 of the NLCS (from the Philadelphia Phillies' local NBC affiliate) and apparently has all of Game 4 of the NLCS. Also, both the WPIX and NBC versions of Game 5 of the ALCS (both of which are also out there in terms of off-air recordings) are known to exist. Earlier games of the NLCS and ALCS have not surfaced and may not exist in the vault.
- 1978 - Trade collectors have all four games of the ALCS (the ABC version) but only Game 4 of the NLCS (again, the source copies are those taped by those at home).

== Local television ==
As previously mentioned, from 1969 until 1983, the Major League Baseball television contract allowed a local TV station in the market of each competing team to also carry the LCS games.

=== 1960s ===
| Year | Teams | Local TV | Play-by-play #1 | Play-by-play #2 | Play-by-play #3 | Color commentator(s) |
|---|---|---|---|---|---|---|
| 1969 | New York Mets-Atlanta | WOR-TV (New York Mets) | Lindsey Nelson | Bob Murphy | Ralph Kiner | Bob Uecker |
| 1969 | New York Mets-Atlanta | WSB-TV (Atlanta) | Ernie Johnson | Milo Hamilton | | |

==== Notes ====
- 1969 - Locally, the NLCS was broadcast in New York City by WOR-TV, the Mets' flagship TV station, and WNBC-TV, the New York City, New York NBC affiliate, and in Atlanta by WSB-TV, the Braves' flagship TV station and Atlanta, Georgia NBC affiliate.

== National radio ==
From 1969 to 1975, there was no official national radio network coverage of the League Championship Series. NBC only had the national radio rights to the All-Star Game and World Series during this period. Instead, national coverage was provided via broadcasts syndicated over ad hoc networks.

=== 2020s ===
| Year | Network | Play-by-play | Color commentator |
|---|---|---|---|
| 2026 | ESPN | Jon Sciambi | Doug Glanville |
| 2025 | ESPN | Jon Sciambi | Doug Glanville |
| 2024 | ESPN | Jon Sciambi | Doug Glanville |
| 2023 | ESPN | Jon Sciambi | Doug Glanville |
| 2022 | ESPN | Jon Sciambi | Doug Glanville |
| 2021 | ESPN | Jon Sciambi | Jessica Mendoza |
| 2020 | ESPN | Jon Sciambi | Jessica Mendoza |

=== 2010s ===
| Year | Network | Play-by-play | Color commentator |
|---|---|---|---|
| 2019 | ESPN | Jon Sciambi | Jessica Mendoza |
| 2018 | ESPN | Dan Shulman | Chris Singleton |
| 2017 | ESPN | Dan Shulman | Aaron Boone |
| 2016 | ESPN | Dan Shulman | Aaron Boone |
| 2015 | ESPN | Jon Sciambi | Chris Singleton |
| 2014 | ESPN | Dan Shulman | Aaron Boone |
| 2013 | ESPN | Dan Shulman | Orel Hershiser |
| 2012 | ESPN | Jon Sciambi | Chris Singleton |
| 2011 | ESPN | Jon Sciambi (Games 1–3, 6); Dave O'Brien (Games 4–5) | Bobby Valentine (Games 1–4, 6); Buck Martinez (Game 5) |
| 2010 | ESPN | Dan Shulman | Dave Campbell |

==== Notes ====
- Originally Terry Francona was assigned to call the 2012 NLCS with Jon Sciambi. However, he was hired by the Cleveland Indians as its manager.

=== 2000s ===
| Year | Network | Play-by-play | Color commentator(s) |
|---|---|---|---|
| 2009 | ESPN | Dan Shulman | Dave Campbell |
| 2008 | ESPN | Dan Shulman | Steve Phillips (in Philadelphia); Orel Hershiser (in Los Angeles) |
| 2007 | ESPN | Dan Shulman | Dave Campbell |
| 2006 | ESPN | Dan Shulman | Dave Campbell |
| 2005 | ESPN | Dan Shulman | Dave Campbell |
| 2004 | ESPN | Dan Shulman | Dave Campbell |
| 2003 | ESPN | Dan Shulman | Dave Campbell |
| 2002 | ESPN | Dan Shulman | Dave Campbell |
| 2001 | ESPN | Charley Steiner | Dave Campbell |
| 2000 | ESPN | Charley Steiner | Dave Campbell |

=== 1990s ===
| Year | Network | Play-by-play | Color commentator |
|---|---|---|---|
| 1999 | ESPN | Charley Steiner | Kevin Kennedy |
| 1998 | ESPN | Charley Steiner | Kevin Kennedy |
| 1997 | CBS | Gary Cohen | Jerry Coleman |
| 1996 | CBS | Jim Hunter | Jerry Coleman |
| 1995 | CBS | Jim Hunter | Jerry Coleman |
| 1993 | CBS | Jerry Coleman | Johnny Bench |
| 1992 | CBS | John Rooney | Jerry Coleman |
| 1991 | CBS | John Rooney | Jerry Coleman |
| 1990 | CBS | John Rooney | Jerry Coleman |

==== See also ====
- List of Major League Baseball on ESPN Radio broadcasters

=== 1980s ===
| Year | Network | Play-by-play | Color commentator |
|---|---|---|---|
| 1989 | CBS | John Rooney | Jerry Coleman |
| 1988 | CBS | Brent Musburger | Jerry Coleman |
| 1987 | CBS | Dick Stockton | Johnny Bench |
| 1986 | CBS | Brent Musburger | Johnny Bench |
| 1985 | CBS | Brent Musburger | Johnny Bench |
| 1984 | CBS | Harry Kalas | Ross Porter |
| 1983 | CBS | Jerry Coleman | Duke Snider |
| 1982 | CBS | Jack Buck | Jerry Coleman |
| 1981 | CBS | Jack Buck | Jerry Coleman |
| 1980 | CBS | Jack Buck | Jerry Coleman |

=== 1970s ===
| Year | Network | Play-by-play | Color commentator |
|---|---|---|---|
| 1979 | CBS | Jack Buck | Jerry Coleman |
| 1978 | CBS | Ralph Kiner | Jerry Coleman |
| 1977 | CBS | Ralph Kiner | Jerry Coleman |
| 1976 | CBS | Ralph Kiner | Jerry Coleman |
| 1975 | Ad hoc | Ralph Kiner | Red Schoendienst |
| 1974 | Ad hoc | Marty Brennaman | Bob Gibson |
| 1973 | Ad hoc | Vin Scully | Bob Gibson |
| 1972 | WLW | Al Michaels | Joe Nuxhall |
| 1971 | Ad hoc | Vin Scully | Bob Gibson |
| 1970 | Ad hoc | Vin Scully | Bob Gibson |

==== Notes ====
- National radio coverage of the 1972 NLCS between the Cincinnati Reds and Pittsburgh Pirates was essentially, a nationally syndicated simulcast of the Reds' local radio broadcasts on WLW.

=== 1969 ===
| Year | Network | Play-by-play | Color commentator |
|---|---|---|---|
| 1969 | Ad hoc | Bob Prince | Gene Elston |

== Local radio ==
Since 1969, the non-national radio broadcasts of the National League Championship Series have been broadcast on the flagship stations and radio networks of the teams participating in the series.

=== 2000s ===
| Year | Teams | Flagship station | Play-by-play #1 | Play-by-play #2 | Play-by-play #3 | Color commentator(s) |
|---|---|---|---|---|---|---|
| 2002 | San Francisco-St. Louis | KMOX | Mike Shannon | Joel Meyers | | |
| 2002 | San Francisco-St. Louis | KNBR (San Francisco) | Duane Kuiper (Games 1–4); Jon Miller (Game 5) | Joe Angel | Duane Kuiper (Game 5) | Mike Krukow |
| 2001 | Arizona-Atlanta | KTAR-AM (Arizona) | Greg Schulte | Jeff Munn | | Rod Allen and Jim Traber |
| 2001 | Arizona-Atlanta | WSB-AM (Atlanta) | Pete Van Wieren | Skip Caray | | Don Sutton and Joe Simpson |

==== Notes ====
- 2002 - Locally, the NLCS was called on KNBR in San Francisco by Jon Miller (Game 5), Duane Kuiper, Joe Angel, and Mike Krukow, and on KMOX-AM in St. Louis by Mike Shannon and Joel Meyers.
- 2001 - Locally, the NLCS was called on KTAR-AM in Phoenix by Greg Schulte, Jeff Munn, Rod Allen and Jim Traber, and on WSB-AM in Atlanta by Pete Van Wieren, Skip Caray, Don Sutton, and Joe Simpson.

=== 1980s ===
| Year | Teams | Flagship station | Play-by-play #1 | Play-by-play #2 | Color commentator(s) |
|---|---|---|---|---|---|
| 1989 | San Francisco-Chicago Cubs | WGN-AM (Chicago Cubs) | Harry Caray | Dewayne Staats | Dave Nelson |
| 1989 | San Francisco-Chicago Cubs | KNBR (San Francisco) | Hank Greenwald | Ron Fairly | |
| 1986 | New York Mets-Houston | WHN (AM) (New York) | | | |

==== Notes ====
- 1989 - Locally, the NLCS was called on KNBR in San Francisco by Hank Greenwald and Ron Fairly, and on WGN-AM in Chicago by Harry Caray, Dewayne Staats and Dave Nelson.

=== 1960s ===
| Year | Teams | Flagship station | Play-by-play #1 | Play-by-play #2 | Play-by-play #3 |
|---|---|---|---|---|---|
| 1969 | New York Mets-Atlanta | WJRZ-AM/WABC-FM (New York Mets) | Lindsey Nelson | Bob Murphy | Ralph Kiner |
| 1969 | New York Mets-Atlanta | WSB-AM (Atlanta) | Ernie Johnson | Milo Hamilton | |

==== Notes ====
- 1969 - Locally, the NLCS was called on WJRZ-AM/WABC-FM in New York by Lindsey Nelson, Bob Murphy, and Ralph Kiner, and on WSB-AM in Atlanta by Ernie Johnson and Milo Hamilton.
