= List of New Jersey Devils broadcasters =

This is a list of broadcasters for the New Jersey Devils ice hockey team.

== Television ==
Years	Play-by-play	Color commentator(s)
1982–83	Larry Hirsch; Al Albert	Fred Shero (TV); Stan Fischler (Cable)
1983–84	Mike Emrick	John Davidson (select games); Mike Eruzione (select games)
1984–85	Mike Emrick	Peter Mahovlich
1985–86	Mike Emrick	Sal Messina
1986–87	Al Albert	Stan Fischler
1987–93	Gary Thorne (primary); Jiggs McDonald or Al Albert (select games during Thorne's New York Mets baseball assignments and New York Islanders's off-days)	Peter McNab
1993–95	Mike Emrick	Peter McNab
1995–96	Mike Emrick	Doug Sulliman
1996–2011	Mike Emrick	Chico Resch
2011–14	Steve Cangialosi	Chico Resch
2014–2022	Steve Cangialosi	Ken Daneyko; Bryce Salvador (rinkside on all home games)
2022–2025	Bill Spaulding	Ken Daneyko; Bryce Salvador (rinkside on all home games)
2025–present	Don La Greca	Ken Daneyko; Bryce Salvador (rinkside on all home games)

=== Notes ===
On July 21, 2011, Emrick announced that he was leaving the New Jersey Devils to work exclusively for NBC Sports. In the beginning of the 2011–12 season, Steve Cangialosi replaced Emrick for play-by-play duties for the Devils. Cangialosi later announced on May 17, 2022 that he will step down from play-by-play commentary on Devils broadcasts. He is expected to be replaced by Bill Spaulding starting in the 2022-23 season.

Ken Daneyko currently provides his color commentary on Devils' broadcasts on MSG Plus. Before this, he shared commentary and analysis between periods of Devils' broadcasts and was a regular starring analyst on MSG's Hockey Night Live! with host Al Trautwig and fellow commentators Ron Duguay, Dave Maloney, Mike Keenan, and Butch Goring, as well as "The Hockey Maven" Stan Fischler.

=== Current on-air staff ===
Television: MSG Plus

== Radio ==
Years	Play-by-play	Color commentator(s)
1982–86	Larry Hirsch	Fred Shero
1986–87	Dale Arnold	Fred Shero
1987–88	Dale Arnold	Larry Brooks
1988–91	Chris Moore	Larry Brooks
1991–93	Chris Moore	Sherry Ross
1993–95	Mike Miller	Sherry Ross
1995-01	Mike Miller	Randy Velischek
2001–06	John Hennessey	Randy Velischek
2006–07	Matt Loughlin	Tom Chorske
2007–17	Matt Loughlin	Sherry Ross
2017–present	Matt Loughlin	Chico Resch

=== Notes ===
Sherry Ross first broadcast color commentary for the Devils from January 1992 through the strike-shortened 1994–95 season, before being re-hired for the role in 2007. On November 25, 2009, she called a play-by-play of a game between the Devils and the Ottawa Senators, as Loughlin missed the game due to a death in his family, becoming the first woman to provide the English language play-by-play for a full NHL game. On May 23, 2017, Ross was relieved of her duties as the Devils' radio analyst, and Chico Resch replaced her.

=== Current on-air staff ===
Radio: Audacy, WFAN (selected games)

- Matt Loughlin – play-by-play
- Chico Resch – color commentator

== See also ==
- Historical NHL over-the-air television broadcasters
