= Howie Rose =

American sportscaster (born 1954)

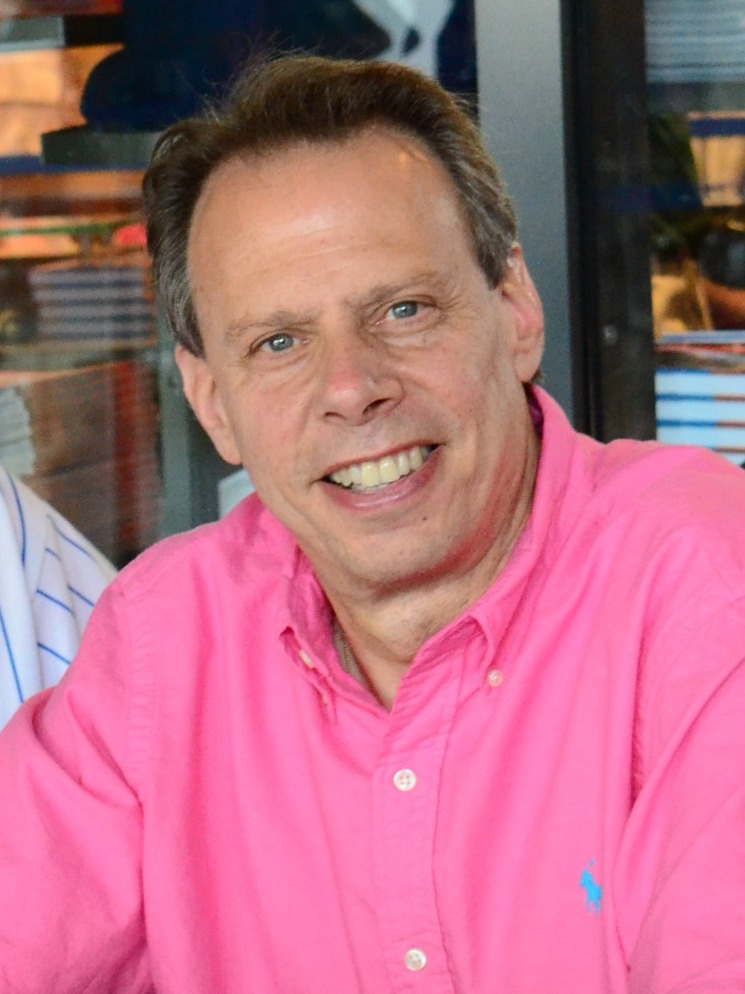
- Rose in 2013
- Born: Howard Jeffrey Rose; February 13, 1954 (age 72); New York City, New York, U.S.
- Occupation: Sportscaster
- Spouse: Barbara
- Children: 2 daughters

Howard Jeffrey Rose (born February 13, 1954) is an American retired sportscaster who was a broadcaster for the New York Mets, New York Rangers and New York Islanders. He was a Mets broadcaster from 1987-2026.

== Early life ==
Rose was born in the New York City borough of Brooklyn to a Jewish family. Rose's father, an avid New York Yankees fan, encouraged his baseball fandom. When the New York Mets moved into Shea Stadium in 1964, Rose became a regular attendee at games. He attended PS 205Q (The Alexander Graham Bell School), Benjamin N. Cardozo High School in Bayside, Queens, and graduated from Queens College in 1977.

== Career ==
Rose started his career doing sports updates on New York City-based Sports Phone, a telephone dial-in service, in 1975, which led to sports updates on news radio station WCBS-AM through the early 1980s. He was the original prime-time radio host on WFAN when the station went all-sports in 1987, hosting the program until 1995.

=== New York Mets (1987–2026) ===
Rose called Mets play-by-play on radio or television from 1995 until his retirement in 2026, and is regarded by fans and media outlets alike as an expert in Mets history. He hosted the "Mets Extra" pre- and post-game shows from 1987–1994. He worked the television booth from 1995 until the retirement of long-time Mets radio voice Bob Murphy in 2003. This included serving as a pre- and post-game host during the 2000 World Series. The following year, Rose took Murphy's spot alongside Gary Cohen on WFAN.

Cohen became the play-by-play broadcaster on then-new Mets television network SportsNet New York (SNY) starting during the 2006 season, and Rose began sharing the radio booth with partner Tom McCarthy from 2006-07. In 2008, Wayne Hagin replaced McCarthy, and from 2012 to 2018, Rose called games with Josh Lewin. From 2019 to 2022, Rose called games with Wayne Randazzo. From 2023 season until his retirement in 2026, Howie's booth partner was Keith Raad, with Pat McCarthy (since 2023) occasionally filling in. From 2014 to 2018, he called games on WOR, before moving to WCBS in 2019. He has also co-hosted MLB Now, joining Brian Kenny, Mark DeRosa, and Ken Rosenthal on MLB Network.

He called the Mets' loss to the Kansas City Royals in the 2015 World Series.

Rose has also been the master of the ceremonies during key Mets events, including Opening Day at Shea Stadium and Citi Field since 2004. He has hosted ceremonies marking the opening of Citi Field in 2009, the 40th anniversary of the Mets 1969 World Series victory, a special pregame ceremony honoring Ralph Kiner in 2008, Mike Piazza's number retirement ceremony in 2016, and Old-Timers' Day in 2022. Additionally, he hosted the number retirement ceremonies of Keith Hernandez, Dwight Gooden (2024), Darryl Strawberry (2024), David Wright (2025), and Carlos Beltran (2026).

In 2022, Rose began to cut back his schedule, calling approximately 100 games a season, following health issues; this included road trips to National League East opponents. By the 2026 season, he only called home games and the Subway Series matchups played at Yankee Stadium.

On March 19, 2026, Rose announced that he would retire from the Mets at the conclusion of the 2026 season. He called his final game on September 20, when the Mets played the Philadelphia Phillies in a 7–2 loss in their final home game of the season. Plans to honor him with a pregame ceremony were scrapped due to inclement weather, with a formal ceremony honoring him set to take place on Opening Weekend 2027.

=== Hockey ===
Rose worked as a play-by-play radio announcer for the New York Rangers, and was paired mainly with Sal Messina. He is most recognized by Rangers fans for his call when Stéphane Matteau scored the game-winning goal in double-overtime of game seven of the 1994 NHL Eastern Conference Finals against the New Jersey Devils en route to the Stanley Cup Final.

"Fetisov, for the Devils, plays it cross-ice into the far corner. Matteau swoops in to intercept. Matteau behind the net, swings it in front – HE SCORES! MATTEAU! MATTEAU! MATTEAU! STÉPHANE MATTEAU! And the Rangers have one more hill to climb, baby! But it's Mount Vancouver! The Rangers are headed to the Finals!"

The Rangers would go on to win the cup that year over the Vancouver Canucks 4 games to 3, their first Stanley Cup victory in 54 years.

Rose was the play-by-play announcer for Islanders telecasts where he worked alongside Butch Goring. For the 2009–10 season, Rose's work was simulcast on radio as well. Rose replaced Jiggs McDonald on Islanders broadcasts in 1995–96 and was previously partnered with Ed Westfall, Joe Micheletti, and Billy Jaffe.

After the 2015–16 season, Rose announced he would not return to call Islanders games after the end of the season.

=== Other career roles ===
Rose occasionally worked games for Fox NHL Saturday in the mid-1990s, and now works for MLB on Fox. He has also called Long Island Blackbirds basketball and soccer.

On March 1, 2013, his book Put It In the Book was released. The book, co-written with Phil Pepe, is an autobiography and memoir of 50 years of Mets history.

== Announcing style ==
Rose's end-of-game catchphrase is, "Put it in the books", used after the final out is recorded in a Mets win. After Mets losses, Rose says "and the ballgame is over". When he uses the phrasing "and the Mets are leading by a score of _ to _", he is using the same diction as original Mets broadcaster Lindsey Nelson.

== Awards and honors ==
In 2012, Rose was inducted into the National Jewish Sports Hall of Fame. He has won two Emmy Awards for excellence in broadcasting for the New York Islanders. In 2019, it was announced that he would be inducted into the New York Baseball Hall of Fame. On June 3, 2023, Rose was inducted into the New York Mets Hall of Fame. That same year, on May 31, Rose was honored by the team with a talking bobblehead which repeats his end-of-game phrase, "Put it in the books!"

Rose is scheduled to be honored by the Mets in a pre-game ceremony on Opening Weekend 2027.

== Personal life ==
Rose is married to Barbara, and they have two daughters. Their daughter Alyssa has worked for the Mets organization as a social media personality, and has worked on soap operas such as One Life to Live, had two separate podcasts, called Scoring Position and Drunk Love, and currently works for SportsNet New York (SNY). He lives in Woodbury on Long Island.

During the 2021 season, Rose missed time with an undisclosed medical issue, first from April 13–20, and later missing the last month of the season. Rose was diagnosed with bladder cancer and underwent a radical cystoprostatectomy in September 2021.
