= Steve Gelbs =

American sportscaster and reporter

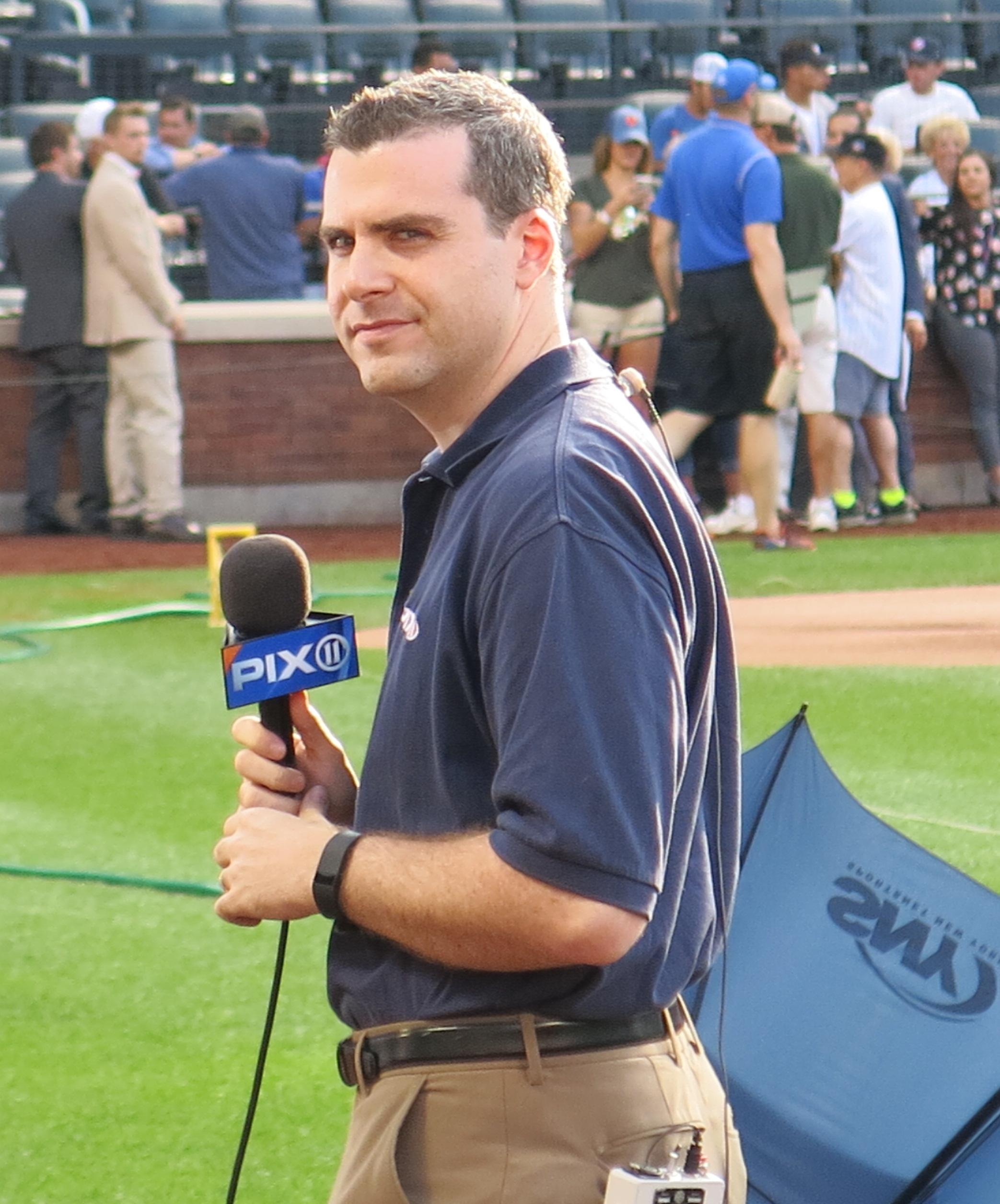
- Gelbs in 2016
- Born: February 1, 1987 (age 39); Rego Park, Queens, New York, U.S.
- Occupations: Sportscaster, reporter
- Spouse: Julie Straus Gelbs
- Children: 2

Steve Gelbs (born February 1, 1987) is an American sportscaster and sports reporter who covers the New York Mets and New York Jets for SNY.

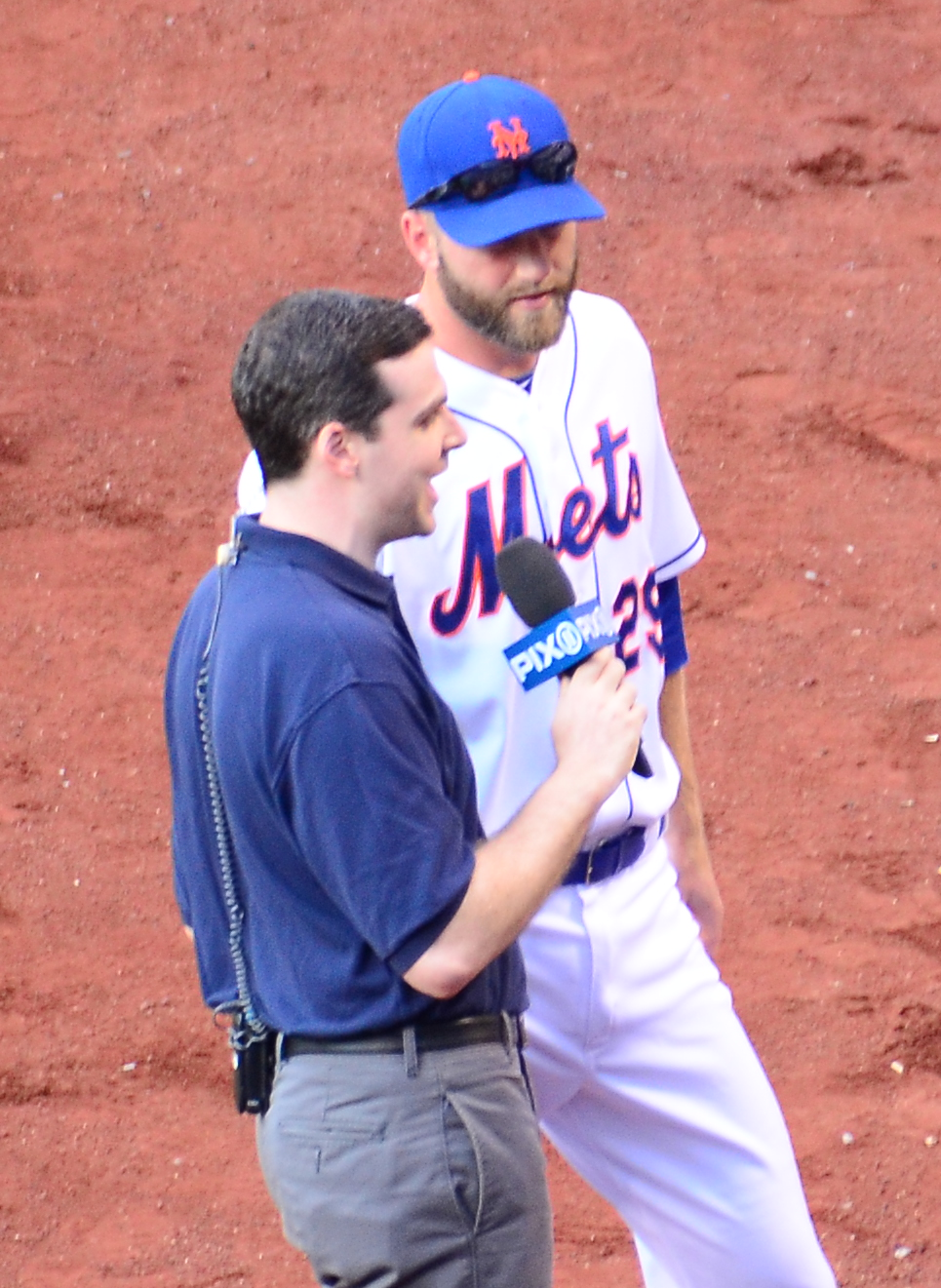
Gelbs interviewing Eric Campbell in 2014

== Early life and education ==
Steven Gelbs was born to Scott H. and Robin A. Gelbs on February 1, 1987, in Rego Park, Queens. He grew up in Greenwich, Connecticut. He has two younger brothers, Jared and Adam; they were raised in Reform Judaism. In the 1990s, when Steve was growing up, his father served as a physical therapist for the New York Rangers of the National Hockey League. Gelbs became a fan of the Rangers, attending Rangers games in part due to his father's position with the team. In his youth, Gelbs was also a fan of the New York Yankees. His uncle operated a dry cleaning business; among his customers was Tom Seaver, who provided the young Gelbs with an autograph, made out to "Little Steven." After graduating from Greenwich High School, Gelbs attended Newhouse School of Public Communications at Syracuse University where he graduated with a BA.

== Career ==
Gelbs began his career broadcasting at MSG Varsity, later moving on to MSG, where he served as the host of MSG 150 during New York Knicks and New York Rangers telecasts. Gelbs joined SportsNet New York in 2013. His first assignment involved covering a Brooklyn Cyclones game for the network. For the 2014 Mets season, Gelbs filled in for Kevin Burkhardt [in what capacity?] for 50 games, leading to him replacing Burkhardt beginning in the 2015 season as Burkhardt left for Fox Sports. In 2009, Gelbs won the Syracuse Press Club award for "Best Radio Sports Feature." He has also been nominated for four New York Emmy Awards, including "Sports Anchor of the Year" in 2012.

Gelbs, along with fellow broadcasters Keith Hernandez, Gary Cohen, and Ron Darling, won the 2019 Sterling Award for best broadcasting booth in the MLB.

Gelbs voiced himself in "Abe League of Their Moe", a 2025 episode of The Simpsons.

During the 2026 Major League Baseball season Gelbs began reviewing ballpark hot dogs during games in a segment SNY titled "Let's Be Frank". He ranked Globe Life Field's hot dog the highest at an 8.8/10, while ranking Great American Ball Park's Skyline Chili-inspired hot dog the lowest at a 1.4.

== Personal life ==
On November 21, 2015, Gelbs married Julie Straus, whom he had proposed to in 2014. He has two children, born in 2019 and 2021.
