= Ed Coleman (sportscaster) =

American sports broadcaster

- Born: October 7, 1949 (age 76); Lawrence, Massachusetts, U.S.
- Education: Syracuse University
- Occupation: Sportscaster
- Years active: 1980s–present

Edward F. Coleman (born October 7, 1949) was a radio reporter for the New York Mets on WFAN.

== Early life ==
Coleman graduated from Syracuse University in 1971.

== Career ==
=== WFAN ===
He started his career on WFAN as Steve Somers' overnight update person in the 1980s before moving on and being replaced by Suzyn Waldman. He also co-hosted the afternoon show with Mike Francesa until Chris "Mad Dog" Russo was hired.

In the early 1990s, he co-hosted WFAN's midday show with Dave Sims. The show was nicknamed the Coleman and the Soul Man. When the show was canceled he was reassigned as WFAN's New York Mets beat reporter. Coleman's duties were expanded to being host of Mets Extra (and later a fill-in play-by-play) when former host Howie Rose was hired to do play-by-play for the Mets and the Islanders games on SportsChannel New York. Coleman hosted programs periodically throughout the baseball off-season as well as a weekly program on Sunday afternoon or evening during the National Football League regular season. From 1998 to 2002, he called St. John's Red Storm men's basketball games with Gary Cohen.

Coleman retired from WFAN on April 1, 2022.

=== Olympics ===
Coleman did some radio work for the 1988 and 1992 Summer Olympics, as well as the 1994 Winter Olympics. His big break in radio came in 1982, when he was the sports announcer during morning drive at WCAP, Lowell, Massachusetts after a stint at the short-lived Enterprise Radio Network. Coleman became a beloved person in the Lowell community, where the Spindle City Press Association's highest award is the Ed Coleman Award for journalistic achievement.
