= Wayne Randazzo =

American sports broadcaster

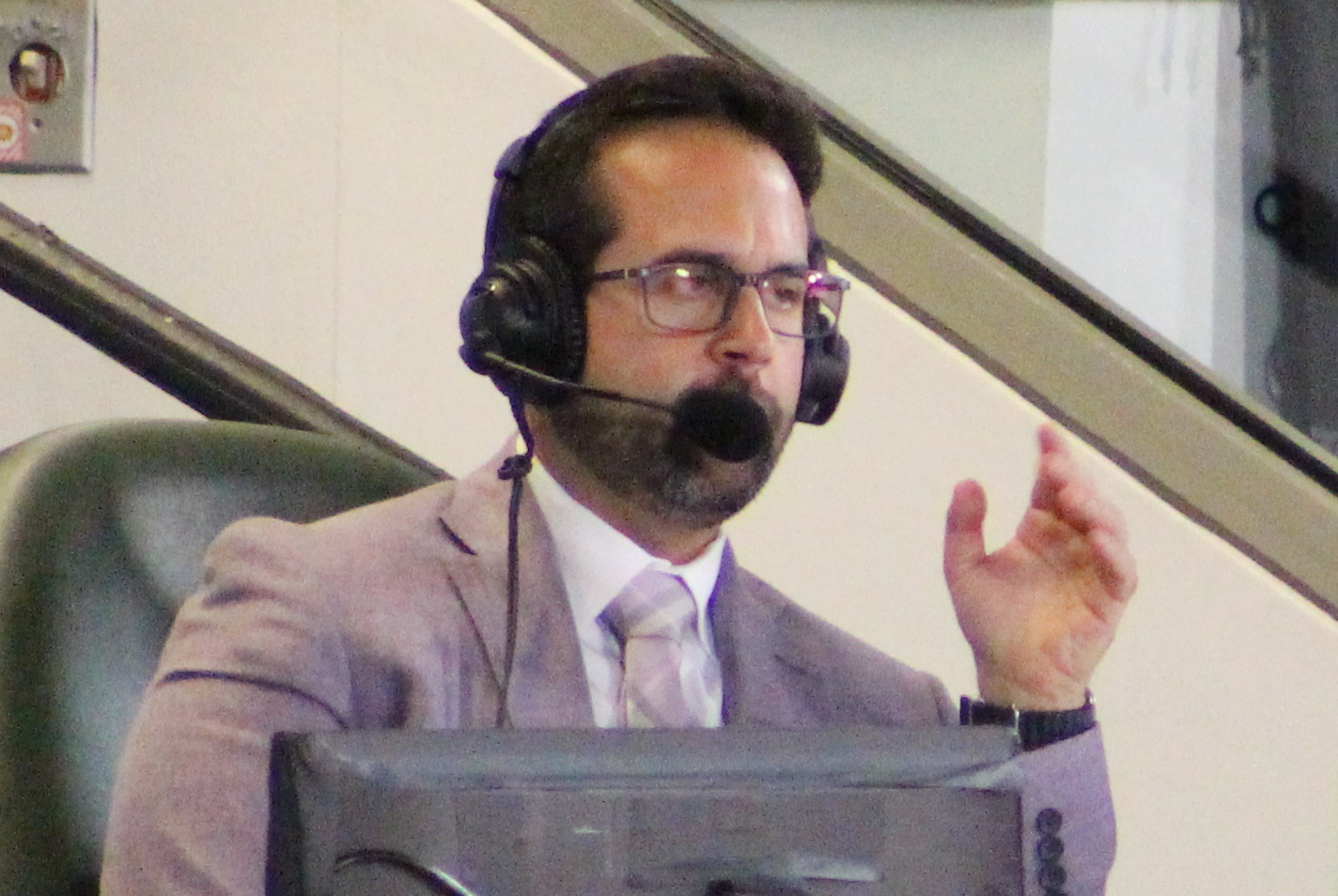
- Randazzo at Angel Stadium in 2024
- Born: Wayne Randazzo; May 2, 1984 (age 42); Chicago, Illinois, U.S.
- Education: North Central College
- Occupation: Play-by-play announcer
- Employer(s): Los Angeles Angels; Apple TV; Big Ten Network; Chicago Bulls

Wayne Randazzo (born May 2, 1984) is an American sportscaster. He is the primary television play-by-play announcer for the Los Angeles Angels of Major League Baseball (MLB), Apple TV, Big Ten Network and the Chicago Bulls.

== Early life and education ==
Randazzo was born in Chicago and attended St. Charles East High School in St. Charles, Illinois. He earned his undergraduate degree at North Central College in Naperville, Illinois.

== Career ==
Randazzo called Kane County Cougars games from 2012 to 2014. Randazzo called college baseball and softball for the Big Ten Network and provided sports commentary on WSCR and WBBM in Chicago, as well as broadcasting games for the Chicago White Sox and Chicago Sky. In 2015, Randazzo was named the host of the New York Mets pre and post-game shows, then on WOR. He became the regular play-by-play broadcast partner of Howie Rose for the 2019 season with the departure of Josh Lewin. On September 23, 2022, filling in on Apple TV+'s Friday Night Baseball broadcast, he called Albert Pujols's 700th home run in a game between the St. Louis Cardinals and Los Angeles Dodgers.

Randazzo departed WCBS after four seasons in December 2022. On January 3, 2023, Bally Sports West confirmed he would become the television play-by-play announcer for the Los Angeles Angels. He continues calling games for Apple TV+ and also serves as a fill-in announcer for national MLB telecasts on Fox and the Chicago Bulls of the NBA on Chicago Sports Network.
