= Sherry Ross =

American sports broadcaster and journalist

Sherry Ross (born c. 1954) is an American sports broadcaster and journalist who most recently worked alongside Matt Loughlin as a color commentator for the NHL's New Jersey Devils radio broadcasts. She is the first woman to serve as an analyst for the Stanley Cup Final, and the first woman to call play-by-play for a full NHL game.

== Background ==
Born in Dover, New Jersey, Ross grew up in Randolph, where she graduated from Randolph High School and was inducted into its Hall of Fame in 2007. She graduated from Rutgers University–Newark in 1977 with a degree in English and attended University of Illinois studying veterinary medicine but later chose journalism as a career.

She has been a resident of West Orange, New Jersey.

== Career ==
Ross began her career in 1978 as a hockey reporter for the Daily Record newspaper in Morristown, New Jersey. She has also worked as a sportswriter for The Record (Bergen County), New York Newsday, and the New York Daily News, for whom she continues to work in the hockey offseason covering horse racing. From the 1990–91 season to the 2003–04 season, she was the author of the Hockey Scouting Report, an annually published guide to all active NHL players.

Ross first broadcast color commentary for the Devils from January 1992 through the lockout-shortened 1994–95 season, prior to being re-hired for the role in 2007. On November 25, 2009, she called play-by-play of a game between the Devils and the Ottawa Senators, as Loughlin missed the game due to a death in his family, becoming the first woman to provide English language play-by-play for a full NHL game.

On May 23, 2017, Ross was relieved of her duties as the Devils' radio analyst. She was later replaced by former Devils goalie Chico Resch.
