= Mike Crispino =

American sportscaster

Mike Crispino is an American sportscaster. Crispino is the lead play by play announcer for UCONN Men's Basketball team on iHeart Radio ESPN 97.9, as well as UCONN Football and Baseball. Crispino was also a play by play announcer for MSG Network for almost 20 years mainly covering New York Knicks basketball before moving on in 2017.

Crispino began his career in 1984 at WRCH Radio and WVIT-TV in Hartford. From 1988 to 1992, Crispino was the sports director of WLVI-TV in Boston. There he called Boston Celtics games during the 1989–1990 season and New England Patriots pre-season games in 1992. Crispino's sports department was named the "Best in New England" by the Associated Press in 1989 and 1990. From 1988 to 1992, he called the play-by-play for college basketball games on ESPN and SportsChannel, while also calling college football, boxing, baseball, and lacrosse for the New England Sports Network. Crispino also hosted a talk show at WEEI concurrently to working at WLVI.

Crispino was hired by MSG in 1992 to host MSG SportsDesk and Knicks GameNight. He has since served in a multitude of roles including stints as host of The St. John's Report, Yankees Scorecard, and Heineken Jets Journal. Crispino has also served as a clubhouse reporter for the New York Yankees, a fill-in play-by-play announcer for the New York Mets, and as the studio host for New York Rangers and New York Liberty. Crispino has called the Colgate Games, the PSAL Championships and Golden Gloves Boxing. At FSN New York, Crispino hosted New Jersey Nets and New York Islanders telecasts.

Crispino has served as a play-by-play announcer for the New York Knicks, New York Liberty, New York Giants, New York Jets, New York CityHawks, PGA Golf and Bridgeport Bluefish, and was a sports anchor at WNBC-TV from 2005 to 2007. He also calls basketball for the Big Ten Network.

Nationally, Crispino has hosted College Football Saturday and NCAA baseball regionals for CSTV. From 2002 to 2006, he served as ESPN's play-by-play announcer for the U.S. Open, NCAA wrestling and tennis, Major League Lacrosse and also called regional college football and basketball games for ESPN Plus. During this time Crispino hosted "Sports Talk" for ESPN Radio. Crispino also hosted Gamenights and Insiders for NBA TV. On July 17, 2018, he was named the voice of the UConn Huskies Men's basketball and football programs on ESPN Radio (97.9) in Connecticut.
