= Cystoprostatectomy =

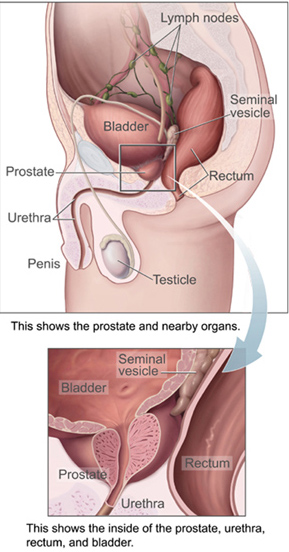
- Prostate and nearby organs
- Other names: Cysto-prostatectomy

A cystoprostatectomy is a surgical procedure in which the urinary bladder and prostate gland are removed. The procedure combines a cystectomy and a prostatectomy.

== See also ==
- List of surgeries by type
