= Josh Lewin =

American sportscaster (born 1967 or 1968)

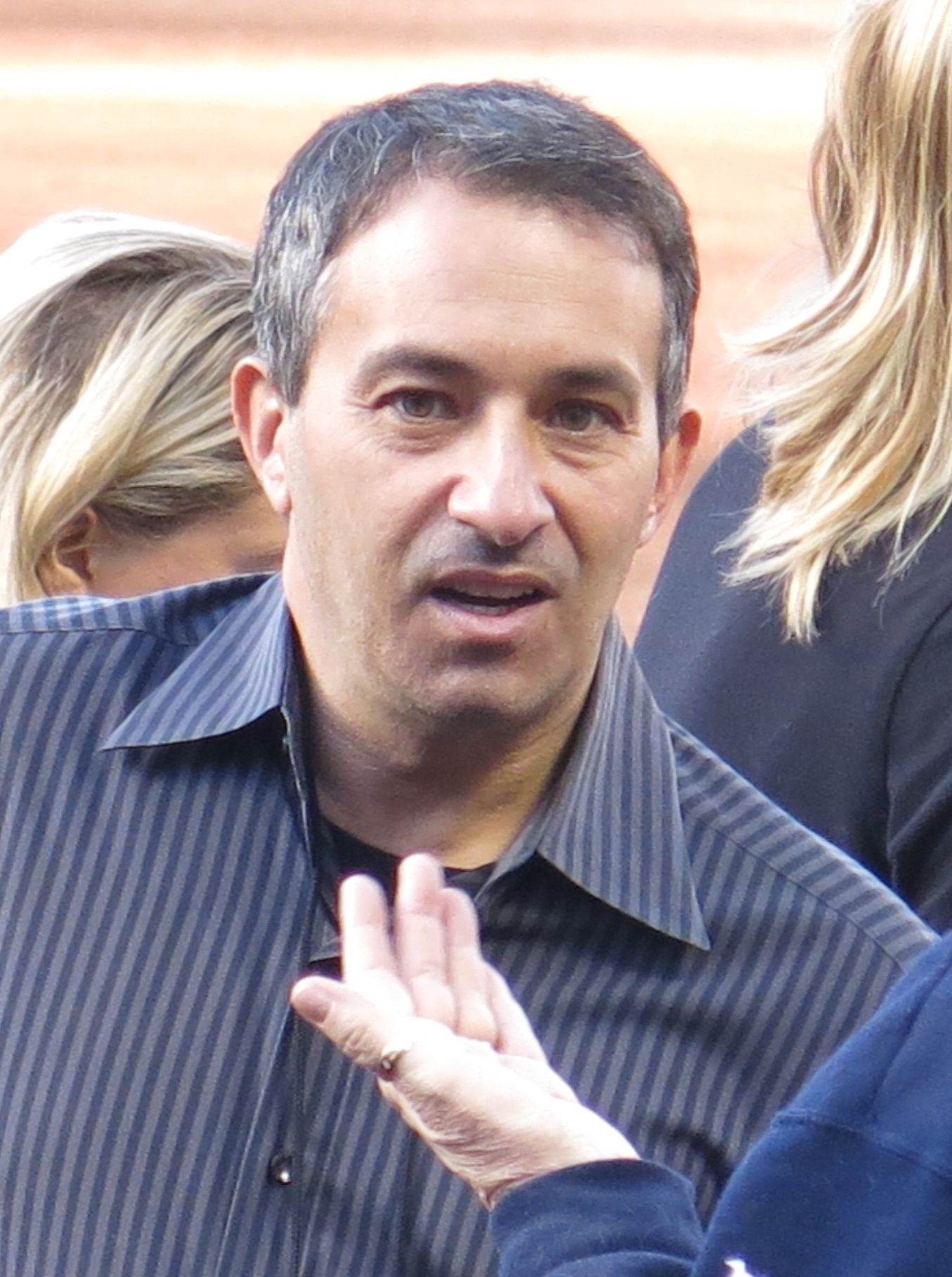
- Lewin in 2017
- Born: 1967 or 1968 (age 57–58); Rochester, New York, U.S.
- Education: Northwestern University
- Occupation: Sportscaster
- Years active: 1991–present

Josh Lewin (born 1967 or 1968) is an American sportscaster who works as a play-by-play announcer for the UCLA Bruins football and basketball teams.

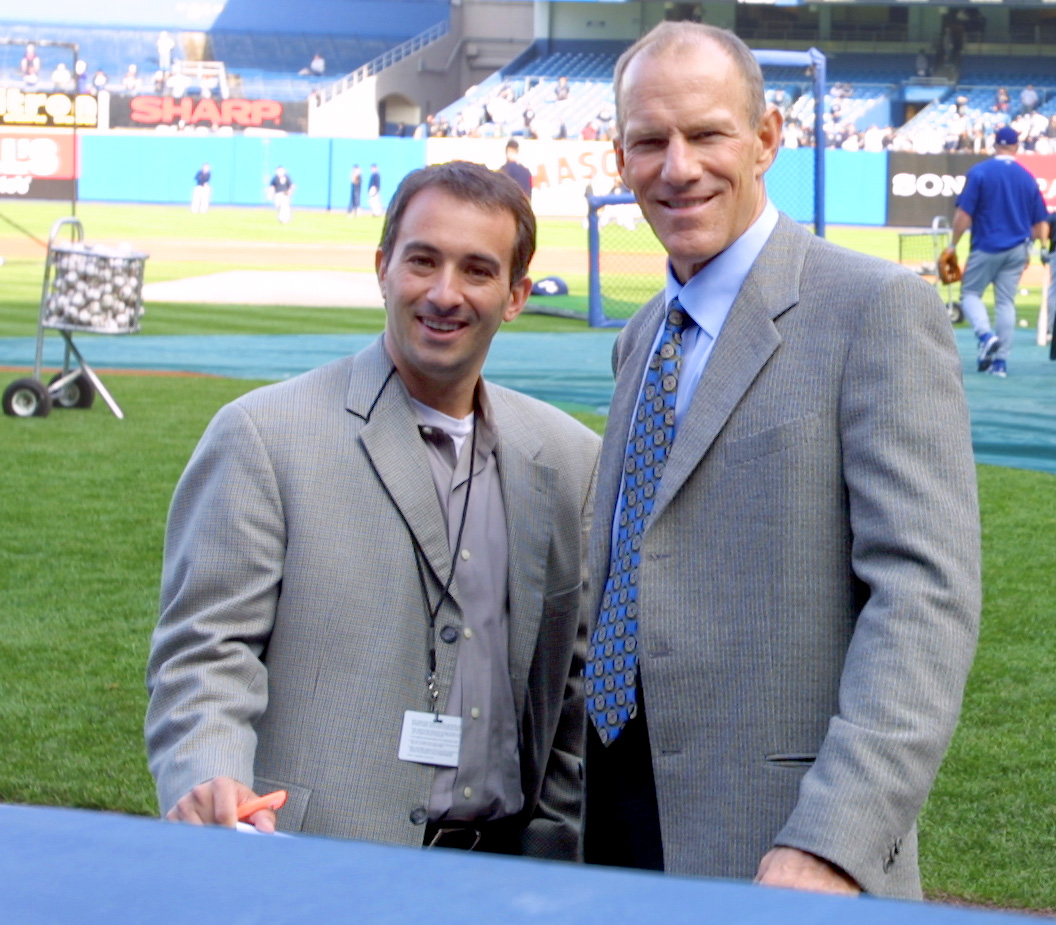
Lewin with Tom Grieve

== Early life and education ==
Lewin was born and raised in Rochester, New York. He attended Brighton High School before graduating from Northwestern University in 1990. He is Jewish.

== Broadcasting career ==
=== Minor league baseball ===
Lewin got his start in broadcasting as the radio commentator for the Rochester Red Wings, then the Triple-A affiliate of the Baltimore Orioles, and became the team's regular play-by-play announcer in 1991. With the Red Wings, Lewin was a member of a staff that included Joe Altobelli, Russ Brandon, Glenn Geffner, Joe Kehoskie, and Bob Socci.

=== Major League Baseball ===
In 1994 Lewin became the host of the sports call-in show Sports Line on WBAL radio in Baltimore. After filling in on Baltimore Orioles radio broadcasts during the 1995 and 1996 seasons, Lewin joined the Chicago Cubs' television broadcasting team on WGN in 1997, before moving on to the Detroit Tigers' TV booth from 1998 to 2001 on Fox Sports Detroit. In 2000, he was the first-ever recipient of the Ty Tyson Award for Excellence in Sports Broadcasting, given by the Detroit Sports Broadcasters Association. Lewin was the TV voice for the Texas Rangers from 2002 through 2011, usually on Fox Sports Southwest but also on local broadcasts for KDFI, KDFW and TXA 21. The Rangers organization announced on October 11, 2010, that Lewin would not be returning as play-by-play announcer for the team. On February 9, 2012, it was announced that Lewin would be joining the New York Mets Radio Network, succeeding Wayne Hagin. He shared play-by-play duties with Howie Rose on Mets broadcasts. Lewin left his position with the Mets following the 2018 season. During the 2019 MLB season, Lewin served as a part-time play-by-play announcer for Boston Red Sox Radio Network broadcasts alongside Joe Castiglione. He is now working for the radio of the Orioles.

Lewin was one of the original play-by-play commentators for Major League Baseball on Fox, calling regular season regional games beginning in 1996. He started on the fourth regional crew calling games, but by 1999 was promoted to the number three booth where he would remain until 2011. He would often fill in for principal play-by-play men Joe Buck (with Tim McCarver during the regular season) or Thom Brennaman (with Steve Lyons during the postseason). Lewin left Fox Sports after his contract with Fox Sports Southwest was not renewed.

=== National Football League ===
During football seasons past, Lewin served as both a sideline reporter and play-by-play man for NFL on Fox and called NFL games for SportsUSA/Jones Radio. From 2005 to 2016, he was the radio voice of the San Diego Chargers (he left after the team's move to Los Angeles at the end of the 2016 season). On August 26, 2006, Lewin provided television play-by-play for Fox Sports' Fox Saturday Baseball game of the week between the New York Yankees and Los Angeles Angels of Anaheim. That game took place at Angel Stadium of Anaheim. When the game was over, he traveled 90 miles down to Qualcomm Stadium in San Diego to provide radio play-by-play coverage of the San Diego Chargers' NFL preseason game against the Seattle Seahawks for the Chargers Radio Network. The two games announced in one day was similar to Ted Leitner's time as announcer for both the Chargers and the San Diego Padres when he would broadcast a Chargers game then travel to join the Padres broadcast late in the baseball season.

=== National Hockey League ===
Lewin has also subbed in as the Dallas Stars play-by-play man when Dallas's usual lead voice, Ralph Strangis, was recovering from a car accident in 2003. He also did play-by-play for Fox NHL Saturday in 1998 and FSN Detroit's coverage of CCHA hockey.

=== The Josh and Elf Show ===
On October 29, 2010, it was announced that Lewin would be moving to 105.3 The Fan to host a new show in their 11am–2pm time slot. The new show started on November 1, 2010, with Greg Williams and Richie Witt moving their show to the 2pm–7pm slot. On Monday, November 29, 2010, it was announced Mark "Elf" Elfenbein would be joining the show now named The Josh and Elf Show. Following Lewin's hiring by the New York Mets and departure from The Fan, Elf and friends was launched. Numerous personalities tried out to fill Lewin's spot. He would eventually be replaced by Jane Slater, making it The Elf and Slater Show.

=== College football ===
Lewin is employed by the Big Ten Network calling football games. He also has called Conference USA football on Sports USA as well. On June 2, 2016, he was hired to be the play-by-play announcer for the UCLA Bruins football team.

=== College basketball ===
Lewin also calls college basketball for UCLA, along with former Bruin standout Tracy Murray. Lewin has made other appearances on Sports USA, Fox Sports Networks, the SMU Mustangs and Michigan State Spartans.

=== XFL ===
In 2023 Lewin began hosting the XFL's official podcast called XFL Week in Review.

eBaseball Pro Spirit 2026 - Konami

Lewin was featured as the play by play commentator for Konami's eBaseball Pro Spirit video game.
