= Kevin Burkhardt =

American sportscaster (born 1974)

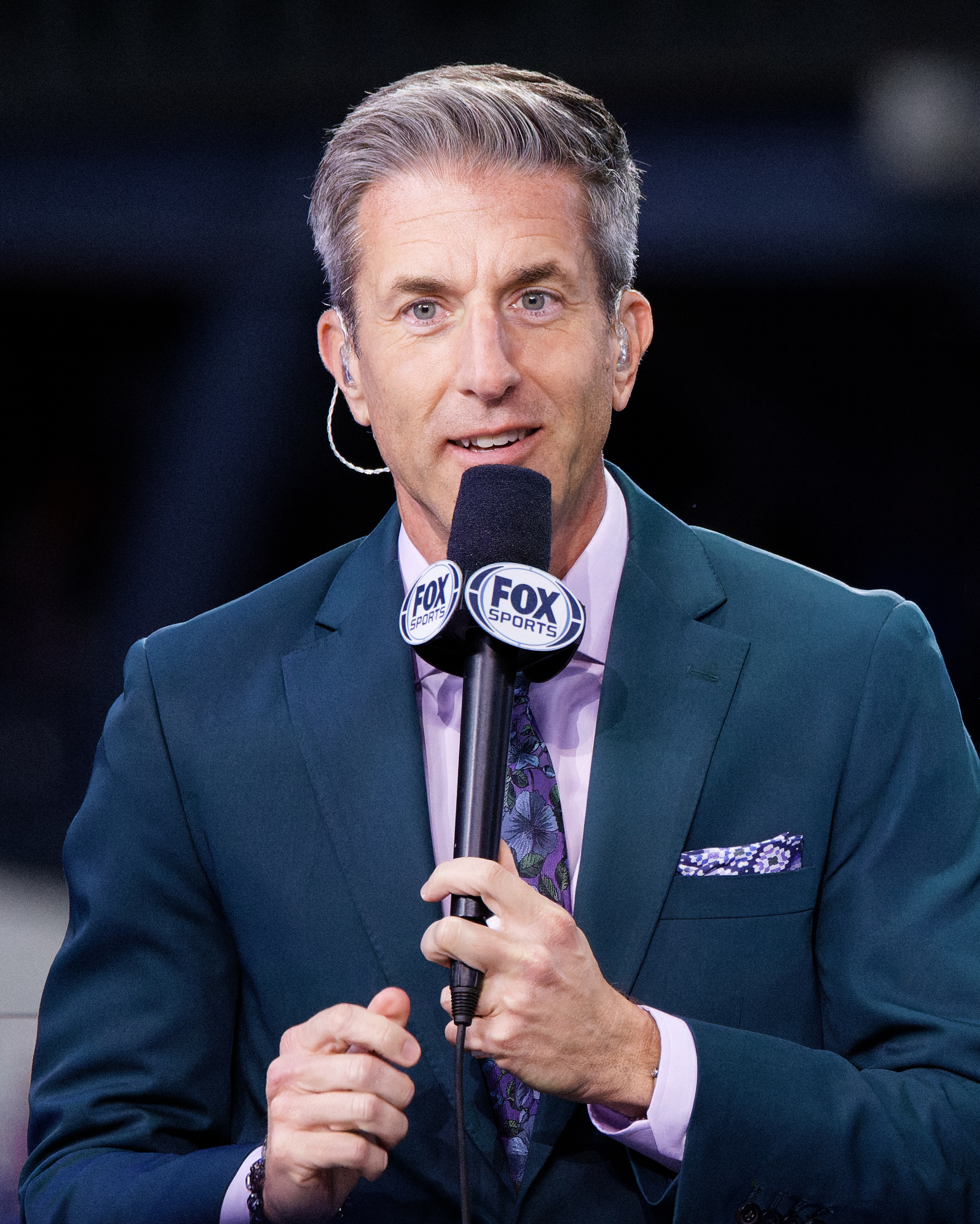
- Burkhardt in 2024
- Born: March 2, 1974 (age 52); Bloomfield, New Jersey, U.S.
- Education: William Paterson University
- Occupation: Sportscaster
- Spouse: Rachel Burkhardt
- Children: 1

Kevin Burkhardt (born March 2, 1974) is an American sportscaster. He is currently the lead play-by-play voice for the NFL on Fox and lead studio host for Fox Major League Baseball.

Burkhardt was formerly a reporter with SportsNet New York (SNY) during New York Mets telecasts from 2007 to 2014. He also called select Mets games during both spring training and the regular season during that time. He has been the primary studio host for Major League Baseball (MLB) telecasts on Fox and FS1 since the 2014 season. He also hosts the "Reunion" episodes of the History Channel's reality series Alone.

== Early life ==
Burkhardt was born on March 2, 1974. He was born and raised in Bloomfield, New Jersey. Growing up, he was a fan of the Philadelphia Eagles. He chose to be an Eagles fan because his favorite NFL Huddle, a stuffed animal mascot sold in Sears Catalog, was one of the Philadelphia Eagles. His favorite player growing up was Ron Jaworski.

In middle school, he did play-by-play for Nintendo games and idolized Gary Cohen (who was later his partner in the Mets' broadcast booth). He graduated from Bloomfield High School in 1992. Burkhardt graduated from William Paterson University in 1997 with a degree in broadcasting.

== Career ==
Burkhardt began his career at the radio station WGHT in Northern New Jersey, spending eight years working for the station, covering events including high school football.

Burkhardt also worked at Jukebox Radio - WJUX, broadcasting New Jersey Jackals minor league baseball games for the Jackals' first four seasons (1998 - 2002). Several years into his career, and unable to get a better broadcasting gig, Burkhardt worked as a car salesman at Pine Belt Chevrolet in Eatontown, New Jersey.

After working at WGHT, Burkhardt got a part-time job working at WFAN, doing freelance work and eventually becoming the station's full-time New York Jets reporter.

During this time, he was a regular on Out of Bounds for Philadelphia's CN8, did sports reporting for Time Warner Cable, and on sports reports for WCBS 880.

=== SportsNet New York ===
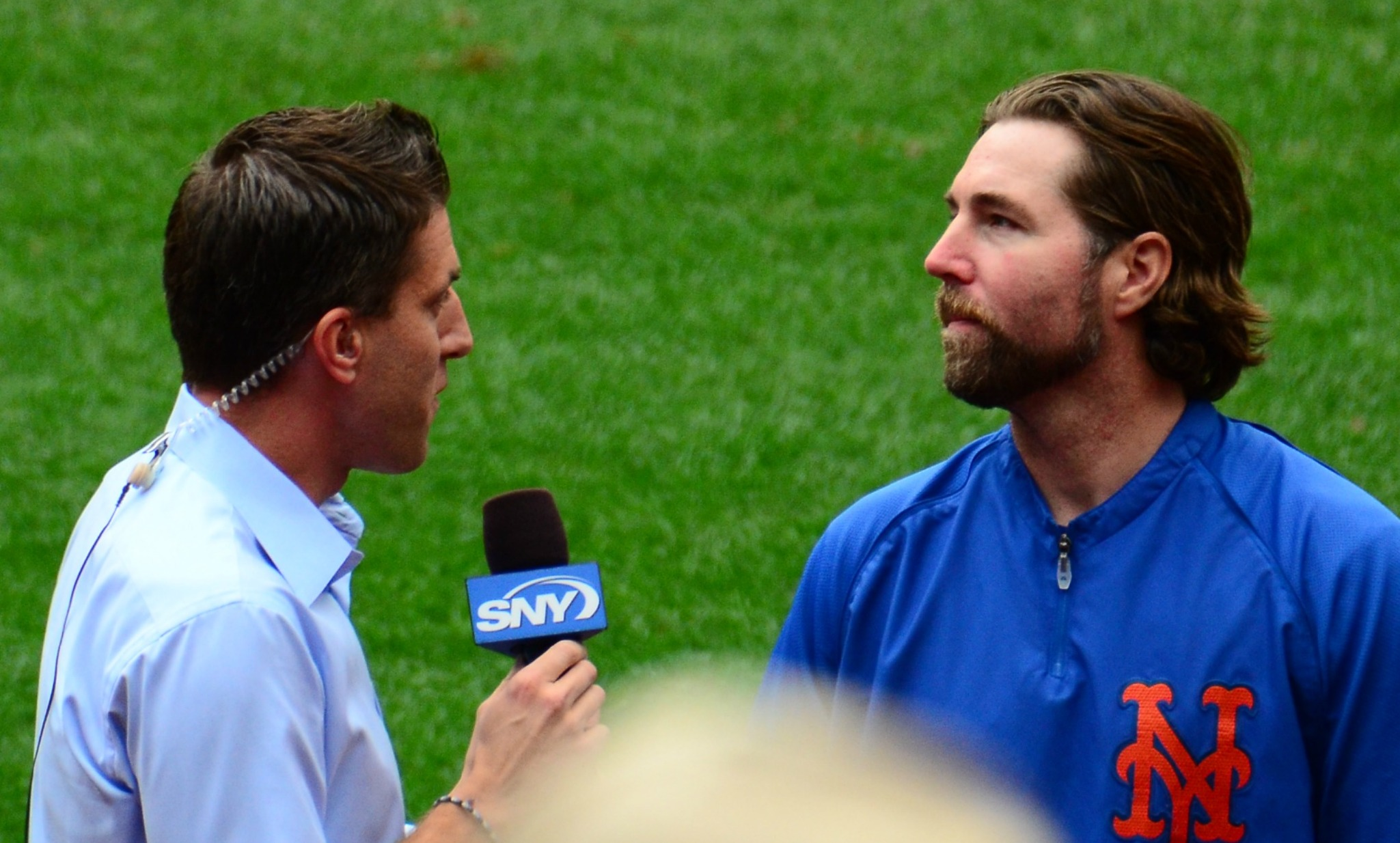
Burkhardt (left) interviewing R. A. Dickey for SNY in 2012

Burkhardt joined the Mets broadcast team at the beginning of the 2007 season, replacing Chris Cotter. Burkhardt interviewed for the SNY job but never thought he would be hired. On SNY he appeared on shows such as Mets Hot Stove, Mets Pre-Game Live, Mets Post-Game Live, and Mets Year in Review. Burkhardt left SNY at the end of the 2014 season for a full-time job at Fox.

=== Compass Radio Network ===
Despite his role with the Mets, Burkhardt wanted to call football games and was offered the ability to do so through the Compass Radio Network. There he called the 2009 Texas Bowl. At Compass Radio Network, he called other college football games, as well.

Burkhardt was also the play-by-play voice for Dallas Cowboys games on Compass Radio Networks from the inauguration of its America's Team Radio Network in 2011 until 2013, when he joined the NFL on Fox and was replaced by Kevin Ray. His color commentator on the broadcasts was Danny White.

=== Fox Sports ===
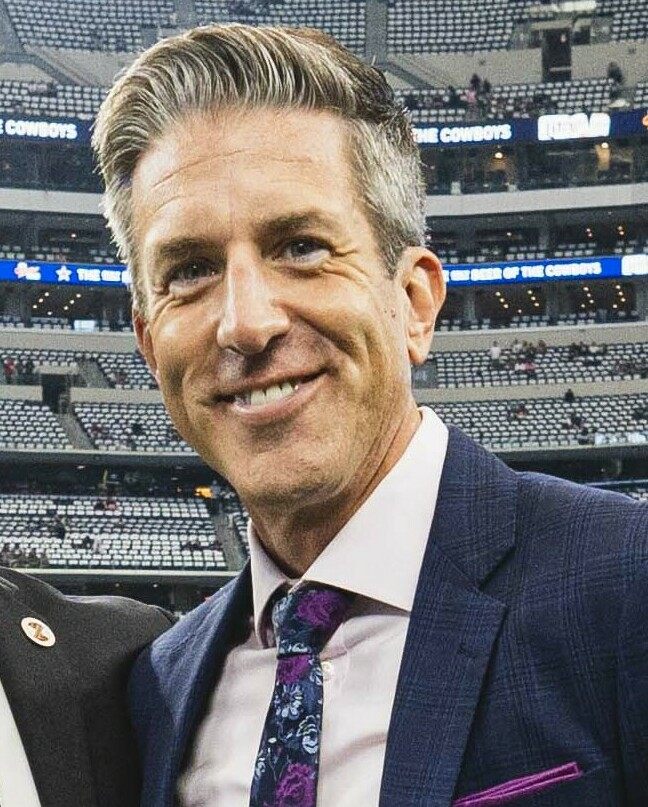
Burkhardt in 2022

In 2013, Burkhardt began calling games for NFL on Fox, teaming with John Lynch and Erin Andrews as the network's #4 announcer team. This crew also called the divisional playoff game between the New Orleans Saints and Seattle Seahawks on January 11, 2014. He also did fill-in work for Major League Baseball on Fox in 2012 and 2013, and in 2014 was named as pre-game host for MLB coverage on Fox and Fox Sports 1. He also joined the Fox College Hoops team.

After Joe Buck left Fox for ESPN and ABC in 2022, Burkhardt was promoted to the lead NFL on Fox broadcast team alongside Greg Olsen as color commentator (until Tom Brady joined Fox's lead broadcast team in 2024). Burkhardt was the television play-by-play announcer for Super Bowl LVII. With his call, he became the first play-by-play announcer other than Jim Nantz, Joe Buck or Al Michaels to call a Super Bowl since Super Bowl XXXVIII.

He was praised for his work in his first season as Fox's lead broadcaster and during his call of Super Bowl LVII. Throughout the season, critics commended Burkhardt for striking a good level of excitement when necessary and for keeping games exciting. In Super Bowl LVII, he was praised for providing important information such as stating that despite the touchdown call by Eagles' running back Kenneth Gainwell being overturned, Gainwell still managed to pick up the necessary yardage for a first and goal.

== Personal life ==
Burkhardt is married to Rachel and they have a son.

Sporting positions
Preceded by Joe Buck	Lead play-by-play announcer The NFL on Fox; 2022–present	Succeeded by Incumbent
Preceded by Joe Buck	Super Bowl television play-by-play announcer (NFC package carrier); 2023–present	Succeeded by Incumbent
