= Lindsey Nelson =

American sportscaster

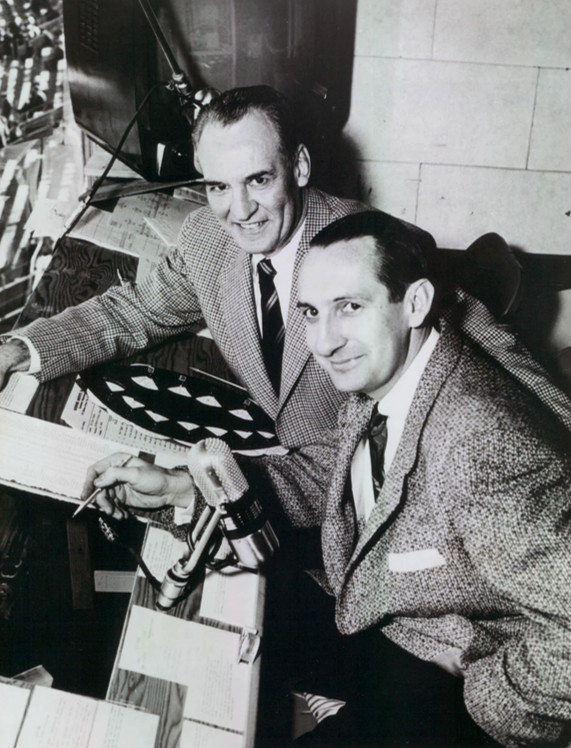
- Nelson (foreground) with Red Grange in 1955
- Born: May 25, 1919; Pulaski, Tennessee, U.S.
- Died: June 10, 1995 (aged 76); Atlanta, Georgia, U.S.
- Occupation: Sportscaster
- Known for: Covering the New York Mets, Cotton Bowls, Sugar Bowls, announcing Notre Dame games, and founder of the University of Tennessee's Vol Network

Lindsey Nelson (May 25, 1919 – June 10, 1995) was an American sportscaster best known for his long career calling play-by-play of college football and New York Mets baseball.

Nelson spent 17 years with the Mets and three years with the San Francisco Giants. For 33 years Nelson covered college football, including 26 Cotton Bowls, five Sugar Bowls, four Rose Bowls, and 14 years announcing syndicated Notre Dame games. He is in or honored by 13 separate Halls of Fame.

== Early life ==
Nelson was born on May 25, 1919, in Pulaski, Tennessee, the third child of Jon and Asie Nelson. He graduated from Columbia Central High School in Columbia. He graduated from the University of Tennessee in 1941, taught English, and then served in the U.S. Army, where he was a captain in North Africa and Europe during World War II. He also served as a war correspondent and public relations specialist, and played on an Army baseball team managed by Harry Walker.

== Career ==
Nelson broke into broadcasting in 1948 following a short career as a reporter in Columbia, Tennessee, for the Columbia Daily Herald newspaper. Nelson then returned to his alma mater in Knoxville, Tennessee, to create and become the first play-by-play announcer for the Vol Network, broadcasting the college football games of the Tennessee Volunteers.

Affectionately known as "Mr. New Year's Day," Nelson subsequently did the play-by-play of the Cotton Bowl Classic for 26 seasons on CBS television, where he earned widespread recognition for his Tennessee drawl and signature opening greeting: "Happy New Year; this is Lindsey Nelson in the Cotton Bowl in Dallas." He also called many Army–Navy Games for CBS, including the 1963 contest in which instant replay was first introduced. (After the initial replay, it fell to Nelson to reassure viewers that Army had not scored again.) For 14 years Nelson was the syndicated television voice of Notre Dame football, and he also called the Mutual Broadcasting System's Monday night radio broadcasts of NFL games from 1974 to 1977, in addition to NFL games for CBS television for many years. He is remembered for being the announcer during the first NFL game on CBS to use "instant replay", which he had to explain repeatedly during the game, reminding viewers that "this is not live."

Nelson began his national baseball broadcast career as one of Gordon McLendon's radio announcers for the Liberty Broadcasting System, which primarily did recreations of games. After a stretch as an administrator with NBC Sports, he began doing the network's baseball broadcasts in 1957. He also worked with CBS Radio broadcasts of Major League Baseball in 1985. Nelson broadcast college football, NBA and college basketball, and professional golf and tennis during his NBC tenure.

=== New York Mets (1962-1978) ===
In 1962, he was hired as the lead broadcaster by the expansion New York Mets, and for the next 17 seasons did both radio and television with Ralph Kiner and Bob Murphy.

While with the Mets, Nelson made the first (and only) radio broadcast of a baseball game from directly above the field. On April 28, 1965, Nelson accompanied the team to the Houston Astrodome for their game against the Astros, and his producer noticed that there was a gondola suspended from the ceiling; Nelson and a broadcast executive agreed to be hoisted in the gondola to a point 208 feet above second base, and called the play-by-play, though as Nelson described it, "At first, I couldn't see anything except a lot of tiny figures. Everybody looked the same height... You couldn't tell a line drive from a pop fly." The Mets lost, 12–9, and Nelson declined to repeat the stunt.

When Chicago White Sox pitcher and former Mets ace Tom Seaver went for his 300th victory in August 1985 against the host New York Yankees, the Yankees TV flagship station WPIX had Nelson call the final half-inning of Seaver's history-making win.

The three-man booth of Nelson, Murphy and Kiner is the second-longest trio of announcers in baseball history, trailing only the Mets current trio of Gary Cohen, Ron Darling and Keith Hernandez.

=== San Francisco Giants ===
In 1979, Nelson moved on to the San Francisco Giants, for whom he worked three seasons. Following the 1981 season, he retired from his on-air role to become a professor of broadcasting at the University of Tennessee.

== Author ==
Nelson released his first book, co-written with Al Hirshberg, Backstage at the Mets, in 1966. In 1985, he wrote his autobiographical memoir entitled Hello Everybody, I'm Lindsey Nelson, his trademark opening phrase.

== Honors ==
Nelson's honors and awards include induction into the National Sportscasters and Sportswriters Association Hall of Fame in Salisbury, North Carolina in 1979; the New York Mets Hall of Fame in 1984; the American Sportscasters Association Hall of Fame in 1986; the Tuss McLaughry Service Award for sports broadcasting in 1988; the Ford C. Frick Award from the Baseball Hall of Fame in 1988; the Pete Rozelle Radio-Television Award from the Pro Football Hall of Fame in 1990; and many more. He was awarded an Emmy Award for Lifetime Achievement in 1991. Nelson was inducted into the University of Tennessee, Knoxville Army ROTC Hall of Fame in 2021. He is a member of the 2020 Class.

The Tennessee Volunteers baseball team's home field was named Lindsey Nelson Stadium after him. Likewise, his high school alma mater of Columbia Central High School's Stadium is also named in honor of Nelson.

== Personal life and retirement ==
Television broadcasts featuring Nelson were notable for his multi-colored plaid sports jackets. He reportedly owned 335 of them at one time. During a broadcast, his jackets often clashed with the set and produced a scintillation effect in the broadcast image. But he figured that if fans could see rather than just hear broadcasts, he might as well give them something interesting to talk about. Nelson's television fashion sense was an inspiration for Jim Brockmire, the title character played by Hank Azaria in the IFC series.

After his retirement from active broadcasting, he moved to Knoxville, Tennessee, to an apartment across the Tennessee River from the University of Tennessee campus from which he had a view of Neyland Stadium, the Vols' home football field.

Nelson died of Parkinson's disease at age 76 on June 10, 1995, in Atlanta, Georgia. He is buried in Polk Memorial Gardens in Columbia. His wife, Mickie, died in 1973. They had two daughters, Nancy and Sharon.

Sporting positions
Preceded by First (official)	Lead play-by-play announcer, Major League Baseball on NBC; 1957–1961	Succeeded by Bob Wolff
Preceded by Van Patrick	Monday Night Football national radio play-by-play announcer 1974-1977	Succeeded by Jack Buck
