= Bob Murphy (sportscaster) =

American sportscaster

- Murphy in front of the radio booth at Shea Stadium named in his honor. (The radio booth at Citi Field is identically named.)
- Born: September 19, 1924; Tulsa, Oklahoma, U.S.
- Died: August 3, 2004 (aged 79); West Palm Beach, Florida, U.S.
- Occupation: Broadcaster
- Years active: 1954–2003
- Known for: Broadcaster for the New York Mets

Robert Allan Murphy (September 19, 1924 – August 3, 2004) was an American sportscaster who spent 50 years doing play-by-play of Major League Baseball games on television and radio. He was best known for announcing the New York Mets, from their inception in 1962 until his retirement in 2003. He was honored by the Baseball Hall of Fame with the Ford C. Frick Award in 1994.

== Early life ==
Murphy was born in Tulsa, Oklahoma, in 1924.

== Broadcasting career ==
Murphy made his first appearance in a baseball broadcast booth with the minor league Muskogee Reds. His first major league job was with the Boston Red Sox in 1954, working alongside Curt Gowdy. In 1960, he moved to the Baltimore Orioles for two seasons, replacing Ernie Harwell.

=== New York Mets ===
Murphy's call of Roger Maris' record-tying 60th home run of the 1961 season became an audition tape that landed him a job with the expansion New York Mets in 1962.

==== Broadcasting style ====
Murphy's broadcasts were known for his optimistic outlook. He would rarely be critical of players and would always strive to emphasize the positive. According to Gary Thorne, who was his partner in the Mets radio booth from 1985 to 1988, Murphy felt that, "the game was to be enjoyed and he sought out the joy in that day's game to bring to the fans."

Murphy, despite his long association with the Mets, never openly rooted for the team from the booth. Listeners knew that he was happier when the Mets won, as evidenced by his mention of a "happy recap" after a Mets win and a "recap" after a Mets loss, but he never referred to the Mets as "we" and, reflecting his love of the game, he would sound equally excited when a good play was made against the Mets as he would when the Mets made a similar play.

Murphy was well known for his sunny outlook. He opened games saying "the sun is shining, the sky is blue, it's a beautiful day for baseball.” Because of this, an unprecedented display of crankiness on his part received much attention. On July 25, 1990, in Philadelphia, the Mets took a 10–3 lead into the ninth inning. But the rival Phillies opened the inning with seven consecutive singles, followed by a walk, and scored six runs to narrow the Mets lead to one run before the Mets were able to turn a double-play and get a line drive out. Murphy's patience was apparently worn thin by the long inning. When the game finally ended, he famously exclaimed, "A line drive caught. The game is over. The Mets win it. A line drive to Mario Díaz. And the Mets win the ballgame! They win the damn thing by a score of 10 to 9!" The use of off-color language was so out of character that it was frequently cited as one of his more memorable moments following Murphy's retirement from the booth in 2003 and later when the Mets honored him after his death in 2004.

Murphy occupied the broadcasting booth in every stadium in the National League, including Jack Murphy Stadium in San Diego, which was named after his brother, Jack, a popular San Diego sportswriter.

==== Broadcast partners ====
From the Mets' first game in 1962 through the post-Tom Seaver days of 1978, on radio and television, the Mets games were announced by the trio of Murphy, along with Lindsey Nelson and Ralph Kiner. Nelson left after the 1978 season and was replaced by Steve Albert. Albert broadcast the Mets for three seasons.

Prior to 1982, the Mets announcers had done television and radio on a rotational system. While two were on TV, the other would take over on radio.

==== 1981-2003 ====
However, in 1982, Murphy was taken out of the television booth, in order to announce the games on radio only. He was joined by Steve Lamar, who also strictly did radio for the Mets. Murphy became known for "painting the word picture;” play-by-play of baseball on radio requires broadcaster to be able to inspire the listener's imagination, which Murphy was cited as doing well. For the rest of his career, with the exception of occasional fill-in duty on the TV side, Murphy announced exclusively from the radio booth.

He was paired with Gary Thorne from 1985 to 1988, and Thorne was his broadcast partner for his memorable call of Bill Buckner's error in Game 6 of the 1986 World Series. Gary Cohen—the current TV voice of the Mets and Murphy's longest tenured partner after Kiner and Nelson—shared the booth with him from 1989 through his 2003 retirement.

In 1995, Murphy briefly returned to television for NBC Sports, his first network broadcasts, calling regional action involving the Mets several times as part of Baseball Night in America.

=== Other broadcasting areas ===
In addition to his baseball work, Murphy was an announcer for the New York Titans (renamed the New York Jets) of the American Football League in 1962–63, and called some college football later in that decade.

He also broadcast minor league hockey and college football in his native Oklahoma. He was the voice of the Oklahoma Sooners during their 47-game winning streak during the 1950s.

Murphy also broadcast several Orange Bowl games in the 1980s on network radio. In addition, from September 17, 1973, through April 5, 1974, Murphy hosted the New York City edition of Bowling for Dollars, on WOR-TV.

== Retirement and death ==
In his later years, Murphy (a smoker) began having trouble calling games due to persistent throat inflammation. After the 2003 season, he left the broadcast booth and retired to Florida. He died of lung cancer August 3, 2004 in West Palm Beach. After his death, the Mets honored Murphy's memory by wearing a patch on the left sleeve of their uniforms for the rest of the 2004 season.

== Awards and honors ==
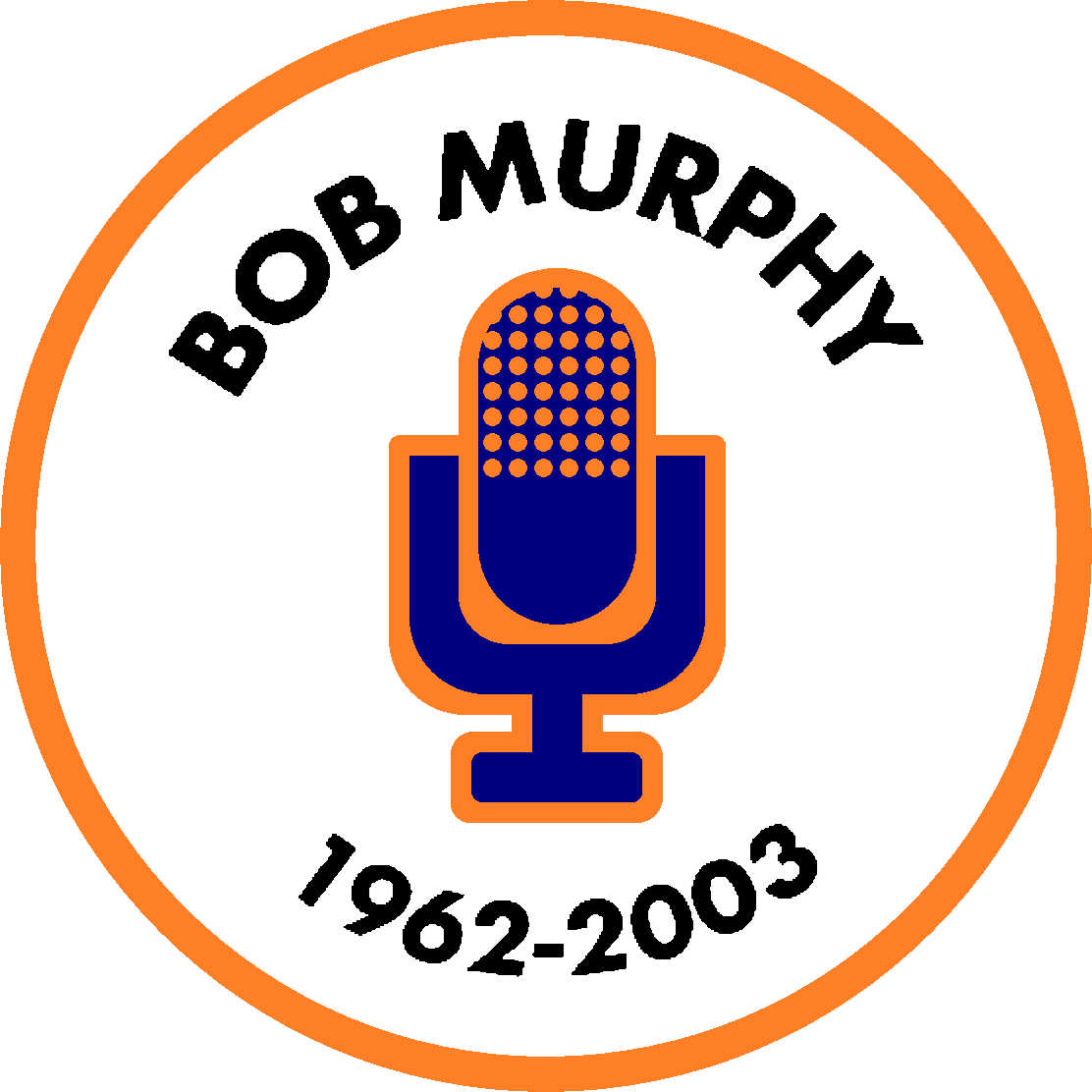
Bob Murphy was honored alongside the retired numbers of the New York Mets in 2023.

Murphy, along with Nelson and Kiner, was inducted into the New York Mets Hall of Fame in 1984. In 1994 he was honored by the Baseball Hall of Fame as a recipient of the prestigious Ford C. Frick Award. He was voted into the National Sportscasters and Sportswriters Hall of Fame in 2002. He was honored with "Bob Murphy Night" at Shea Stadium on September 25, 2003.

In April 2023, the Mets honored Murphy with a large plaque adorning the outfield wall of Citi Field, next to that of his long-time broadcast partner Ralph Kiner.

== Personal life ==
Murphy married Joye in 1972, and they had six children.
