= Wayne Hagin =

American sportscaster (born 1956)

Wayne Hagin (born February 17, 1956) is an American sportscaster, best known as a radio play-by-play announcer for various Major League Baseball teams during his career.

Born in Denver, Colorado, Hagin moved with his family to San Jose, California, where he graduated from Blackford High School in 1974. He attended San Diego State University, graduating in 1979 with a bachelor's degree in radio in television.

Hagin's first play-by-play assignment was with the Oakland Athletics from 1981 to 1984, followed by stints with the San Francisco Giants from 1987 to 1988, the Chicago White Sox from 1989 to 1991, the Colorado Rockies from 1993 (the team's inaugural season) to 2002, the St. Louis Cardinals from 2003 to 2006, and the New York Mets from 2008 to 2011.

Hagin was named Colorado Sportscaster of the Year in 2000 by the National Sportscasters and Sportswriters Association.
