= Matt Loughlin =

American sportscaster

Matt Loughlin is an American sportscaster who is the radio play-by-play voice of the New Jersey Devils of the National Hockey League on WFAN, where he is partnered with former goaltender and former Devils TV color commentator Chico Resch.

Loughlin attended St. Mary's High School in South Amboy, New Jersey, which was later renamed as Cardinal McCarrick High School.

A 1979 graduate of Seton Hall University, Loughlin worked as a sideline reporter and pre- and post-game show host for Devils' telecasts on Fox Sports Net New York from 1997 to 2006. He also hosted intermission reports, where he was often paired with Stan Fischler for a question-and-answer feature called "Matt and the Maven".

Loughlin substituted for play-by-play announcer Mike Emrick on occasion, often due to Emrick's conflicting national broadcast assignments. He served a similar role on New York Mets telecasts from 1996 to 2005.

He has been a resident of Westfield, New Jersey.
