= Gary Cohen =

American sportscaster (born 1958)

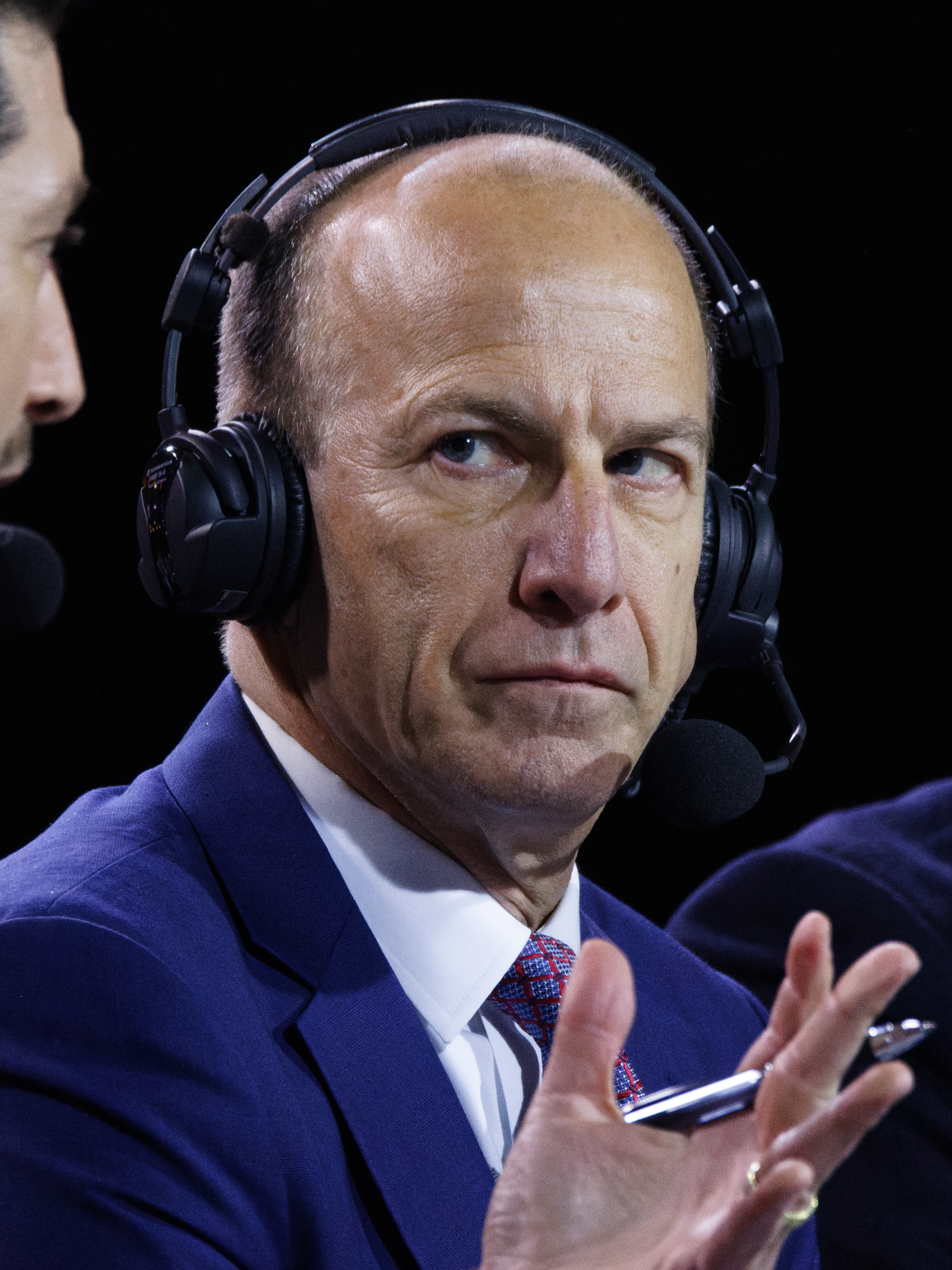
- Cohen during an SNY broadcast in 2022
- Born: April 29, 1958 (age 68); Queens, New York City, U.S.
- Education: Columbia University, '81; B.A., Political Science
- Occupations: Play-by-play and broadcast announcer for the New York Mets & radio announcer for Seton Hall Pirates Men’s Basketball
- Years active: 1983–present
- Spouse: Lynn Cohen (m. 2002)
- Children: 5

Gary Cohen (born April 29, 1958) is an American sportscaster, best known as a radio and television play-by-play announcer for the New York Mets of Major League Baseball (MLB).

Cohen currently calls Mets games for SNY and WPIX, as well as Seton Hall basketball games on WMCA and WNYM. He is famous for his baritone voice and signature calls, most notably "It's outta here!" for when a player hits a home run.

== Early life and education ==
Cohen grew up in the Kew Gardens neighborhood of Queens. He developed an early passion for the New York Mets when the team moved to the newly-constructed Shea Stadium in 1964, and became a regular attendee at games. He closely followed the Mets' World Series victory in 1969 and, as a teenager, attended games on his own during their 1973 pennant run, experiences that cemented his lifelong connection to the team and to the sport of baseball.

Cohen first developed an interest in sports broadcasting while listening to Mets radio announcer Bob Murphy, and came to idolize Marv Albert for his work with the New York Knicks and New York Rangers.

Cohen graduated with a Bachelor of Arts in Political Science from Columbia University in 1981. He began his broadcasting career with WKCR Sports where he did play-by-play for baseball, football and men's basketball. He also announced men's soccer games with future presidential adviser and Good Morning America host George Stephanopoulos.

== Career ==
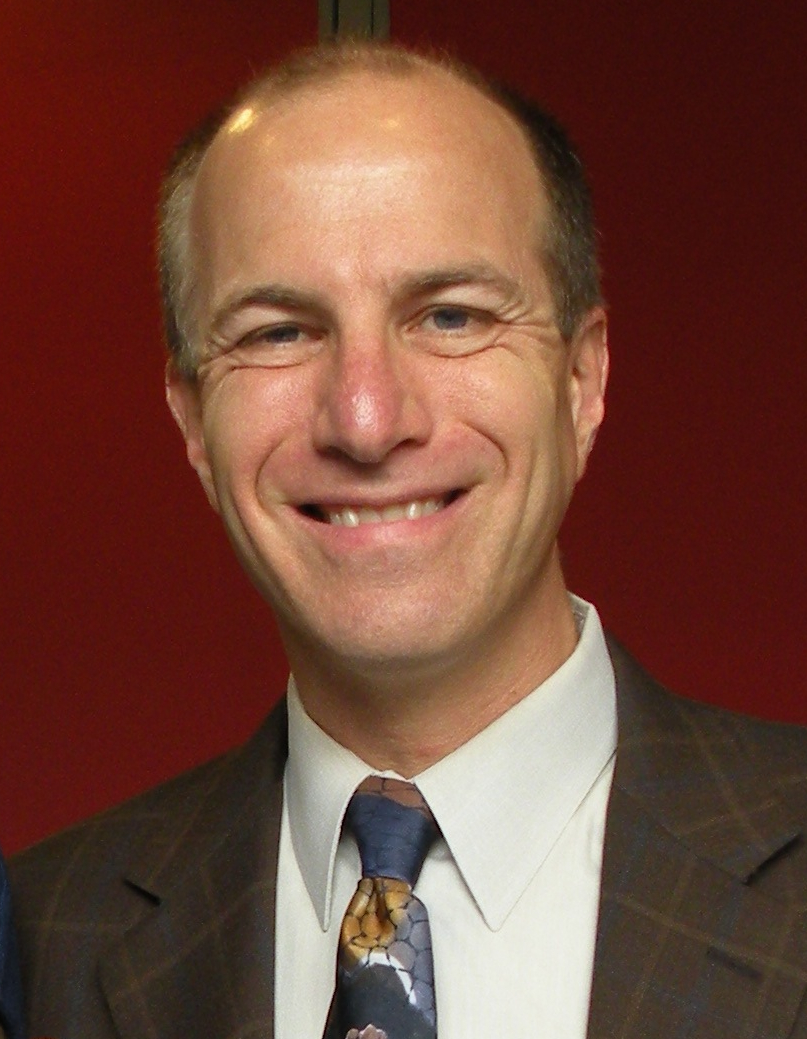
Cohen in 2009

Prior to joining the Mets' broadcast team in 1989, Cohen worked as the voice of the minor league Spartanburg Spinners (1983–1984), Durham Bulls (1986), and Pawtucket Red Sox (1987–1988). He also called ice hockey and basketball games for Providence College from 1988 to 1989, and football for Brown University in 1987. Along with his work with the Mets, Cohen has also called postseason MLB games for ESPN Radio and CBS Radio.

In addition to his baseball duties, Cohen has called men's college basketball games for many years, starting with his duties with St. John's on WFAN, for which he broadcast from 1995 to 2002. Following WFAN's loss of the radio rights to St. John's games, Cohen began broadcasting Seton Hall games, which he continues to do to this day. He also served as a backup announcer on New York Rangers radio broadcasts, called Olympic hockey at the 1992, 1994, and 1998 Winter Olympics, and NCAA tournament games for Westwood One on multiple occasions.

In September 2022, Cohen pre-recorded announcements for the MTA New York City Subway 7 line, along with Keith Hernandez and Ron Darling.

=== Television ===
It was announced on November 9, 2005, that Cohen would become the play-by-play announcer for the new Mets cable television network, SportsNet New York (SNY). As part of the agreement, Cohen also calls about 25 Mets games per year on WPIX along with analysts and former Mets Ron Darling and Keith Hernandez.

He is also known for his vivid and succinct description of the game action, his smooth baritone voice, corny joking with former broadcast partner Howie Rose, and his sometimes biting, but always well-informed baseball commentary. In 2003, Rose became the Mets' lead radio voice following the retirement of Bob Murphy.

== Awards and honors ==
On June 3, 2023, Cohen was inducted into the New York Mets Hall of Fame. In May 2024, Cohen received an honorary doctoral degree from Seton Hall, during a graduation ceremony where he also delivered a commencement speech.

== Personal life ==
Cohen is Jewish. He lives in Connecticut with his wife, Lynn Cohen, and has five children.
