= 1990 New York Mets season =

1990 New York Mets
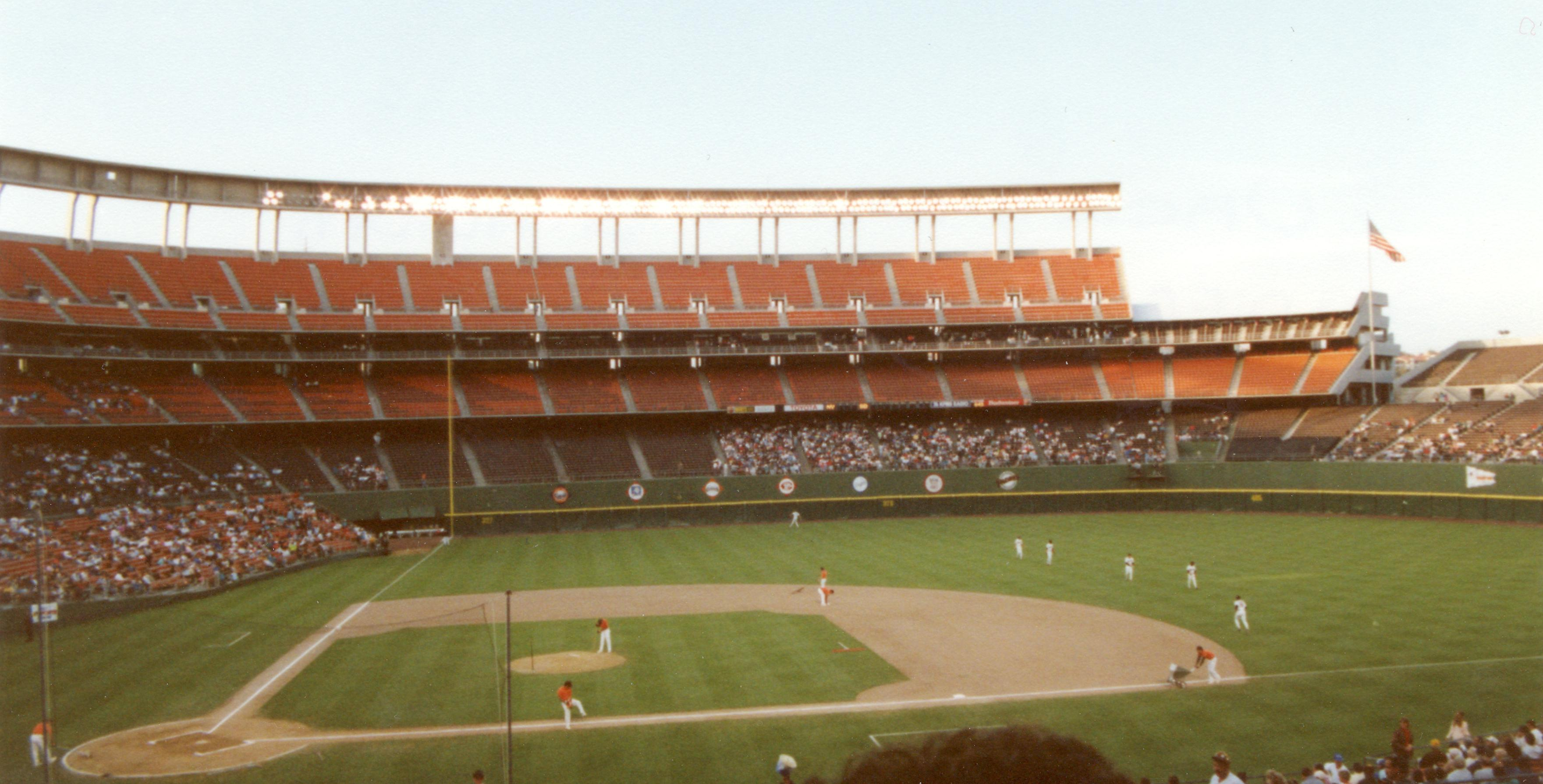
- The Mets playing against the Padres during a 1990 away game at Jack Murphy Stadium.
- League: National League
- Division: East
- Ballpark: Shea Stadium
- City: New York City, New York
- Record: 91–71 (.562)
- Divisional place: 2nd
- Owners: Fred Wilpon and Nelson Doubleday, Jr.
- General manager: Frank Cashen
- Managers: Davey Johnson, Bud Harrelson
- Television: WWOR-TV/SportsChannel New York (Ralph Kiner, Tim McCarver, Fran Healy, Rusty Staub)
- Radio: WFAN (Bob Murphy, Gary Cohen); WSKQ-FM (Spanish) (Juan Alicea, Billy Berroa, Renato Morffi)
- Stats: ESPN.com; Baseball Reference

The 1990 New York Mets season was the 29th regular season for the Mets. They went 91–71 and finished second in the National League East, four games behind the first place Pittsburgh Pirates. The Mets were managed by Davey Johnson and Bud Harrelson. They played home games at Shea Stadium. Despite not making the postseason for the second consecutive year, they would have their last winning season until 1997.

== Offseason ==
- November 14, 1989: Gary Carter was released by the Mets.
- December 5, 1989: John Mitchell and Joaquin Contreras (minors) were traded by the Mets to the Baltimore Orioles for Keith Hughes and Cesar Mejia (minors).
- December 6, 1989: Randy Myers and Kip Gross were traded by the Mets to the Cincinnati Reds for John Franco and Don Brown (minors).
- December 20, 1989: Juan Samuel was traded by the Mets to the Los Angeles Dodgers for Alejandro Peña and Mike Marshall.
- March 26, 1990: D. J. Dozier was signed by the Mets as an amateur free agent.

== Regular season ==
- Darryl Strawberry became the first player in Mets history to have three seasons with 100+ RBIs.
- During the season, Frank Viola became the last pitcher to win at least 20 games in one season for the Mets in the 20th century.

=== Opening Day starters ===
- Kevin Elster
- Dwight Gooden
- Gregg Jefferies
- Howard Johnson
- Barry Lyons
- Mike Marshall
- Kevin McReynolds
- Keith Miller
- Darryl Strawberry

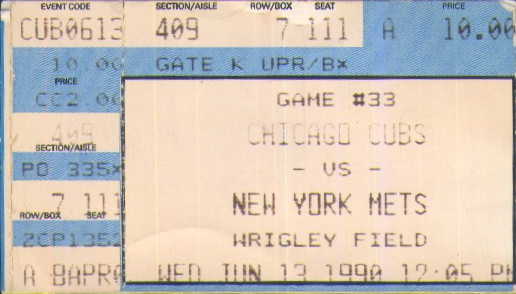
A ticket for a 1990 game between the New York Mets and the Chicago Cubs.

=== Season standings ===
NL East
Team	W	L	Pct.	GB	Home	Road
Pittsburgh Pirates	95	67	.586	—	49‍–‍32	46‍–‍35
New York Mets	91	71	.562	4	52‍–‍29	39‍–‍42
Montreal Expos	85	77	.525	10	47‍–‍34	38‍–‍43
Chicago Cubs	77	85	.475	18	39‍–‍42	38‍–‍43
Philadelphia Phillies	77	85	.475	18	41‍–‍40	36‍–‍45
St. Louis Cardinals	70	92	.432	25	34‍–‍47	36‍–‍45

=== Record vs. opponents ===
1990 National League record Sources:
Team	ATL	CHC	CIN	HOU	LAD	MON	NYM	PHI	PIT	SD	SF	STL
Atlanta	—	6–6	8–10	5–13	6–12	6–6	4–8	5–7	5–7	8–10	5–13	7–5
Chicago	6–6	—	4–8	6–6	3–9	11–7	9–9	11–7	4–14	8–4	7–5	8–10
Cincinnati	10–8	8–4	—	11–7	9–9	9–3	6–6	7–5	6–6	9–9	7–11	9–3
Houston	13–5	6–6	7–11	—	9–9	5–7	5–7	5–7	5–7	4–14	10–8	6–6
Los Angeles	12–6	9–3	9–9	9–9	—	6–6	5–7	8–4	4–8	9–9	8–10	7–5
Montreal	6–6	7–11	3–9	7–5	6–6	—	8–10	10–8	13–5	7–5	7–5	11–7
New York	8–4	9–9	6–6	7–5	7–5	10–8	—	10–8	10–8	5–7	7–5	12–6
Philadelphia	7-5	7–11	5–7	7–5	4–8	8–10	8–10	—	6–12	7–5	8–4	10–8
Pittsburgh	7–5	14–4	6–6	7–5	8–4	5–13	8–10	12–6	—	10–2	8–4	10–8
San Diego	10–8	4–8	9–9	14–4	9–9	5–7	7–5	5–7	2–10	—	7–11	3–9
San Francisco	13–5	5–7	11–7	8–10	10–8	5–7	5–7	4–8	4–8	11–7	—	9–3
St. Louis	5–7	10–8	3–9	6–6	5–7	7–11	6–12	8–10	8–10	9–3	3–9	—

=== Notable transactions ===
- June 4, 1990: Jeromy Burnitz was drafted by the Mets in the 1st round of the 1990 Major League Baseball draft.
- June 19, 1990: Mario Díaz was traded by the Seattle Mariners to the New York Mets for Brian Givens.
- August 30, 1990: Archie Corbin was traded by the Mets to the Kansas City Royals for Pat Tabler.
- August 31, 1990: Julio Machado and Kevin Brown were traded by the Mets to the Milwaukee Brewers for Charlie O'Brien and Kevin Carmody (minors).
- September 10, 1990: Nick Davis (minors) and Steve LaRose (minors) were traded by the Mets to the Houston Astros for Dan Schatzeder.

== Roster ==
1990 New York Mets
Roster
Pitchers: 43 Kevin Brown; 44 David Cone; 15 Ron Darling; 50 Sid Fernandez; 31 John Franco; 16 Dwight Gooden; 40 Jeff Innis; 48 Julio Machado; 13 Jeff Musselman; 19 Bob Ojeda; 26 Alejandro Peña; 43 Dan Schatzeder; 34 Julio Valera; 29 Frank Viola; 47 Wally Whitehurst	Catchers: 49 Todd Hundley; 36 Dave Liddell; 33 Barry Lyons; 35 Orlando Mercado; 33 Charlie O'Brien; 2 Mackey Sasser; 6 Alex Treviño; Infielders: 36 Kevin Baez; 34 Mario Díaz; 21 Kevin Elster; 28 Tom Herr; 9 Gregg Jefferies; 20 Howard Johnson; 10 Dave Magadan; 6 Mike Marshall; 27 Tom O'Malley; 11 Tim Teufel; 24,39 Kelvin Torve	Outfielders: 7 Daryl Boston; 1,7 Chuck Carr; 45 Mark Carreon; 12 Keith Hughes; 46 Chris Jelic; 22 Kevin McReynolds; 25 Keith Miller; 6,28 Darren Reed; 18 Darryl Strawberry; 35 Pat Tabler; 1 Lou Thornton	Manager: 3 Bud Harrelson; 5 Davey Johnson; Coaches: 4 Mike Cubbage (hitting; first base after May 29); 32 Doc Edwards (bench); 3 Bud Harrelson (first base until May 29); 52 Greg Pavlick (bullpen); 30 Mel Stottlemyre (pitching); 23 Chuck Hiller (third base)

== Player stats ==
=== Batting ===
==== Starters by position ====
Note: Pos = Position; G = Games played; AB = At bats; H = Hits; Avg. = Batting average; HR = Home runs; RBI = Runs batted in

Pos	Player	G	AB	H	Avg	HR	RBI
C	Mackey Sasser	100	270	83	.307	6	41
1B	Dave Magadan	144	451	148	.328	6	72
2B	Gregg Jefferies	153	604	171	.283	15	68
SS	Kevin Elster	92	314	65	.207	9	45
3B	Howard Johnson	154	590	144	.244	23	90
LF	Kevin McReynolds	147	521	140	.269	24	82
CF	Daryl Boston	115	366	100	.273	12	45
RF	Darryl Strawberry	152	542	150	.277	37	108

==== Other batters ====
Note: G = Games played; AB = At bats; H = Hits; Avg. = Batting average; HR = Home runs; RBI = Runs batted in

Player	G	AB	H	Avg.	HR	RBI
Keith Miller	88	233	60	.258	1	12
Mark Carreon	82	188	47	.250	10	26
Tim Teufel	80	175	43	.246	10	24
Mike Marshall	53	163	39	.239	6	27
Tom O'Malley	82	121	27	.223	3	14
Tom Herr	27	100	25	.250	1	10
Orlando Mercado	42	90	19	.211	3	7
Barry Lyons	24	80	19	.238	2	7
Charlie O'Brien	28	68	11	.162	0	9
Todd Hundley	36	67	14	.209	0	2
Pat Tabler	17	43	12	.279	1	10
Darren Reed	26	39	8	.205	1	2
Kelvin Torve	20	38	11	.289	0	2
Mario Díaz	16	22	3	.136	0	1
Kevin Baez	5	12	2	.167	0	0
Chris Jelic	4	11	1	.091	1	1
Alex Treviño	9	10	3	.300	0	2
Keith Hughes	8	9	0	.000	0	0
Chuck Carr	4	2	0	.000	0	0
Dave Liddell	1	1	1	1.000	0	0
Lou Thornton	3	0	0	----	0	0

=== Pitching ===
==== Starting pitchers ====
Note: G = Games pitched; IP = Innings pitched; W = Wins; L = Losses; ERA = Earned run average; SO = Strikeouts

Player	G	IP	W	L	ERA	SO
Frank Viola	35	249.2	20	12	2.67	182
Dwight Gooden	34	232.2	19	7	3.83	223
David Cone	31	211.2	14	10	3.23	233
Sid Fernandez	30	179.2	9	14	3.46	181
Julio Valera	3	13.0	1	1	6.92	4

==== Other pitchers ====
Note: G = Games pitched; IP = Innings pitched; W = Wins; L = Losses; ERA = Earned run average; SO = Strikeouts

Player	G	IP	W	L	ERA	SO
Ron Darling	33	126.0	7	9	4.50	99
Bob Ojeda	38	118.0	7	6	3.66	62

==== Relief pitchers ====
Note: G = Games pitched; W = Wins; L = Losses; SV = Saves; ERA = Earned run average; SO = Strikeouts

Player	G	W	L	SV	ERA	SO
John Franco	55	5	3	33	2.53	56
Alejandro Peña	52	3	3	5	3.20	76
Wally Whitehurst	38	1	0	2	3.29	46
Jeff Musselman	28	0	2	0	5.63	14
Julio Machado	27	4	1	0	3.15	27
Jeff Innis	18	1	3	1	2.39	12
Dan Schatzeder	6	0	0	0	0.00	2
Kevin Brown	2	0	0	0	0.00	0

== Farm system ==
Level	Team	League	Manager
AAA	Tidewater Tides	International League	Steve Swisher
AA	Jackson Mets	Texas League	Clint Hurdle
A	St. Lucie Mets	Florida State League	Tim Blackwell
A	Columbia Mets	South Atlantic League	Bill Stein
A-Short Season	Pittsfield Mets	New York–Penn League	Jim Eschen
Rookie	Kingsport Mets	Appalachian League	Jim Thrift
Rookie	GCL Mets	Gulf Coast League	John Tamargo
