= 1991 New York Mets season =

1991 New York Mets
- League: National League
- Division: East
- Ballpark: Shea Stadium
- City: New York
- Record: 77–84 (.478)
- Divisional place: 5th
- Owners: Fred Wilpon and Nelson Doubleday, Jr.
- General manager: Frank Cashen
- Managers: Bud Harrelson, Mike Cubbage
- Television: WWOR-TV/SportsChannel New York (Ralph Kiner, Tim McCarver, Fran Healy, Rusty Staub, Don Criqui)
- Radio: WFAN (Bob Murphy, Gary Cohen, Charlie Slowes); WSKQ-FM (Spanish) (Juan Alicea, Billy Berroa, Renato Morffi)

The 1991 New York Mets season was the 30th regular season for the Mets. They went 77–84 and finished fifth in the National League East for their first losing season since 1983. The Mets were managed by Bud Harrelson and Mike Cubbage. They played home games at Shea Stadium.

== Background ==
The Mets were looking to return to the playoffs for the first time since 1988 in their first full season with Bud Harrelson as manager following the firing of Davey Johnson during the 1990 season. They started out the season strong, briefly holding first place in the National League East during April. They put together a ten-game winning streak in July, and by the 14th stood at 49-34, 2.5 games behind the division leading Pittsburgh Pirates.

From that point forward, the Mets' fortunes changed drastically. After finishing 6-11 in their final games in July, the Mets started August by losing five straight games. After defeating the Pirates in two games on August 7 and 8, they lost their next eleven games to not only fall below .500, but drop to fourth place in the division. As the slump continued into September, Harrelson was fired with seven games to go. Third base coach Mike Cubbage managed the Mets for the remainder of the year, finishing up with a series loss to the Philadelphia Phillies. The Mets finished with a 77-84 record, marking the first time since 1983 that they finished with a sub-.500 record.

== Offseason ==
- November 13, 1990: Chris Jelic was released by the New York Mets.
- December 15, 1990: Bob Ojeda and Greg Hansell were traded by the Mets to the Los Angeles Dodgers for Hubie Brooks.
- January 21, 1991: Rick Cerone was signed as a free agent by the Mets.

== Regular season ==
Howard Johnson set the Mets record for most RBIs in one season with 117.

=== Season standings ===
NL East
Team	W	L	Pct.	GB	Home	Road
Pittsburgh Pirates	98	64	.605	—	52‍–‍32	46‍–‍32
St. Louis Cardinals	84	78	.519	14	52‍–‍32	32‍–‍46
Philadelphia Phillies	78	84	.481	20	47‍–‍36	31‍–‍48
Chicago Cubs	77	83	.481	20	46‍–‍37	31‍–‍46
New York Mets	77	84	.478	20½	40‍–‍42	37‍–‍42
Montreal Expos	71	90	.441	26½	33‍–‍35	38‍–‍55

=== Record vs. opponents ===
1991 National League record Sources:
Team	ATL	CHC	CIN	HOU	LAD	MON	NYM	PHI	PIT	SD	SF	STL
Atlanta	—	6–6	11–7	13–5	7–11	5–7	9–3	5–7	9–3	11–7	9–9	9–3
Chicago	6–6	—	4–8	9–3	2–10	10–7	11–6	8–10	7–11	4–8	6–6	10–8
Cincinnati	7–11	8–4	—	9–9	6–12	6–6	5–7	9–3	2–10	8–10	10–8	4–8
Houston	5–13	3–9	9–9	—	8–10	2–10	7–5	7–5	4–8	6–12	9–9	5–7
Los Angeles	11–7	10–2	12–6	10–8	—	5–7	7–5	7–5	7–5	10–8	8–10	6–6
Montreal	7–5	7–10	6–6	10–2	7–5	—	4–14	4–14	6–12	6–6	7–5	7–11
New York	3–9	6–11	7–5	5–7	5–7	14–4	—	11–7	6–12	7–5	6–6	7–11
Philadelphia	7-5	10–8	3–9	5–7	5–7	14–4	7–11	—	6–12	9–3	6–6	6–12
Pittsburgh	3–9	11–7	10–2	8–4	5–7	12–6	12–6	12–6	—	7–5	7–5	11–7
San Diego	7–11	8–4	10–8	12–6	8–10	6–6	5–7	3–9	5–7	—	11–7	9–3
San Francisco	9–9	6–6	8–10	9–9	10–8	5–7	6–6	6–6	5–7	7–11	—	4–8
St. Louis	3–9	8–10	8–4	7–5	6–6	11–7	11–7	12–6	7–11	3–9	8–4	—

=== Notable transactions ===
- April 2, 1991: Alex Diaz and Darren Reed were traded by the Mets to the Montreal Expos for David Sommer (minors) and Terrel Hansen (minors).
- June 3, 1991: 1991 Major League Baseball draft
  - Bill Pulsipher was drafted by the Mets in the 2nd round. Player signed August 22, 1991.
  - Jason Isringhausen was drafted by the Mets in the 44th round. Player signed May 24, 1992.
- July 15, 1991: Ron Darling and Mike Thomas were traded by the Mets to the Montreal Expos for Tim Burke.

== Roster ==
1991 New York Mets
Roster
Pitchers: 38 Blaine Beatty; 46 Terry Bross; 44 Tim Burke; 36 Tony Castillo; 17,44 David Cone; 15 Ron Darling; 50 Sid Fernandez; 31 John Franco; 16 Dwight Gooden; 40 Jeff Innis; 26 Alejandro Peña; 39 Rich Sauveur; 48 Pete Schourek; 43 Doug Simons; 34 Julio Valera; 29 Frank Viola; 47 Wally Whitehurst; 33 Anthony Young	Catchers: 13 Rick Cerone; 49 Todd Hundley; 5 Charlie O'Brien; 2 Mackey Sasser; Infielders: 23 Chris Donnels; 21 Kevin Elster; 19 Jeff Gardner; 28 Tom Herr; 9 Gregg Jefferies; 20,44 Howard Johnson; 10 Dave Magadan; 25 Keith Miller; 11 Garry Templeton; 11 Tim Teufel; 39 Kelvin Torve	Outfielders: 6 Daryl Boston; 7 Hubie Brooks; 27 Chuck Carr; 45 Mark Carreon; 1 Vince Coleman; 0 Terry McDaniel; 22 Kevin McReynolds	Manager: 4 Mike Cubbage; 3 Bud Harrelson; Coaches: 4 Mike Cubbage (third base); 32 Doc Edwards (bench); 52 Greg Pavlick (bullpen); 51 Tom Spencer (hitting/first base); 30 Mel Stottlemyre (pitching)

== Player stats ==
=== Batting ===
==== Starters by position ====
Note: Pos = Position; G = Games played; AB = At bats; H = Hits; Avg. = Batting average; HR = Home runs; RBI = Runs batted in

Pos	Player	G	AB	H	Avg.	HR	RBI
C	Rick Cerone	90	227	62	.273	2	16
1B	Dave Magadan	124	418	108	.258	4	51
2B	Gregg Jefferies	136	486	132	.272	9	62
3B	Howard Johnson	156	564	146	.259	38	117
SS	Kevin Elster	115	348	84	.241	6	36
LF	Kevin McReynolds	143	522	135	.259	16	74
CF	Vince Coleman	72	278	71	.255	1	17
RF	Hubie Brooks	103	357	85	.238	16	50

==== Other batters ====
Note: G = Games played; AB = At bats; H = Hits; Avg. = Batting average; HR = Home runs; RBI = Runs batted in

Player	G	AB	H	Avg.	HR	RBI
Keith Miller	98	275	77	.280	4	23
Daryl Boston	137	255	70	.275	4	21
Mark Carreon	106	254	66	.260	4	21
Mackey Sasser	96	228	62	.272	5	35
Garry Templeton	80	219	50	.228	2	20
Charlie O'Brien	69	168	31	.185	2	14
Tom Herr	70	155	30	.194	1	14
Chris Donnels	37	89	20	.225	0	5
Todd Hundley	21	60	8	.133	1	7
Jeff Gardner	13	37	6	.162	0	1
Tim Teufel	20	34	4	.118	1	2
Terry McDaniel	23	29	6	.207	0	2
Chuck Carr	12	11	2	.182	0	1
Kelvin Torve	10	8	0	.000	0	0

=== Pitching ===
==== Starting pitchers ====
Note: G = Games pitched; IP = Innings pitched; W = Wins; L = Losses; ERA = Earned run average; SO = Strikeouts

Player	G	IP	W	L	ERA	SO
David Cone	34	232.2	14	14	3.29	241
Frank Viola	35	231.1	13	15	3.97	132
Dwight Gooden	27	190.0	13	7	3.60	150
Ron Darling	17	102.1	5	6	3.87	58
Anthony Young	10	49.1	2	5	3.10	20
Sid Fernandez	8	44.0	1	3	2.86	31

==== Other pitchers ====
Note: G = Games pitched; IP = Innings pitched; W = Wins; L = Losses; ERA = Earned run average; SO = Strikeouts

Player	G	IP	W	L	ERA	SO
Wally Whitehurst	36	133.1	7	12	4.19	87
Pete Schourek	35	86.1	5	4	4.27	67
Tony Castillo	10	23.2	1	0	1.90	10

==== Relief pitchers ====
Note: G = Games pitched; W = Wins; L = Losses; SV = Saves; ERA = Earned run average; SO = Strikeouts

Player	G	W	L	SV	ERA	SO
John Franco	52	5	9	30	2.93	45
Jeff Innis	69	0	2	0	2.66	47
Alejandro Peña	44	6	1	4	2.71	49
Doug Simons	42	2	3	1	5.19	38
Tim Burke	35	3	3	1	2.75	34
Terry Bross	8	0	0	0	1.80	5
Rich Sauveur	6	0	0	0	10.80	4
Blaine Beatty	5	0	0	0	2.79	7
Julio Valera	2	0	0	0	0.00	3

== Awards and honors ==
=== League leaders ===
- Howard Johnson – National League leader, home runs (38)
- Howard Johnson – National League leader, RBI (117)

=== All-Stars ===
Frank Viola, Howard Johnson 1991 Major League Baseball All-Star Game

== Farm system ==
Level	Team	League	Manager
AAA	Tidewater Tides	International League	Steve Swisher
AA	Williamsport Bills	Eastern League	Clint Hurdle
A	St. Lucie Mets	Florida State League	John Tamargo
A	Columbia Mets	South Atlantic League	Tim Blackwell
A-Short Season	Pittsfield Mets	New York–Penn League	Jim Thrift
Rookie	Kingsport Mets	Appalachian League	Andre David
Rookie	GCL Mets	Gulf Coast League	Junior Roman

LEAGUE CHAMPIONS: Columbia
