= Smith–Wills Stadium =

Baseball Stadium in Jackson, Mississippi

- Location within Mississippi Location within the United States
- Interactive map of Smith–Wills Stadium
- Location: Jackson, Mississippi
- Coordinates: 32.336401°N 90.153943°W
- Owner: State of Mississippi
- Operator: KSG-Overtime Sports

Construction
- Opened: 1975

Tenants
- Jackson Mets (TL) 1975–1990; Jackson Generals (TL) 1991–1999; Jackson DiamondKats (TLL) 2000; Jackson Senators (CBL) 2002–2005

Smith–Wills Stadium is a 5,200 seat baseball stadium in Jackson, Mississippi. It is located on Lakeland Drive, less than half a mile east of Interstate 55, in the northeastern part of the city.

== History ==
The stadium was originally built in a move by Jackson administration to attract Professional Minor League baseball team. It opened in 1975. Over the years, it has hosted professional baseball as well as musical concerts. In 1999, the stadium hosted its final affiliated professional baseball game, and in 2005 its final professional game. With the addition of FieldTurf artificial turf, Smith–Wills was converted into a true multipurpose facility, able to host a variety of sports and events including football and soccer. Smith–Wills is still used as a venue for MHSAA football events for Jackson Public School District high schools. A three-year deal was signed for the Smith–Wills Stadium to host the Southwestern Athletic Conference baseball tournament beginning in 2020. However, two weeks after that agreement was announced, the NCAA canceled all spring championship events for the 2020 season, due to the COVID-19 pandemic.

== Home teams ==
=== Mets ===
Smith–Wills Stadium was the home of the Jackson Mets from 1975 to 1990. The Jackson Mets were a Texas League AA affiliate of the New York Mets. The Mets moved into Smith–Wills stadium prior to the end of construction. At the home opener for the Mets in 1975, the stadium still lacked a roof over the press-box, and still had an unpaved parking lot.

=== Generals ===
Smith–Wills Stadium was the home of the Jackson Generals (now Corpus Christi Hooks) from 1991 to 1999. The Jackson Generals were a Texas League AA affiliate of the Houston Astros. After the 1999 season, the Generals were sold to an investment group headed by Major League Baseball hall of famer Nolan Ryan, and were relocated to the newly built Dell Diamond in Round Rock, Texas. Then owner Con Maloney cited poor attendance as well as an aging stadium with no future upgrades or renovations planned as a reason for the demise of the team.

=== DiamondKats ===
Smith–Wills Stadium was the home of the Jackson DiamondKats in 2000. The Jackson DiamondKats were an independent team and played in the Texas-Louisiana League, which changed its name in 2005 to the Central Baseball League but is now defunct.

=== Senators ===
Smith–Wills Stadium was the home of the Jackson Senators from 2002 to 2005. The Jackson Senators were an independent team and played in the Central Baseball League. In 2005, affiliated Minor League Baseball returned to the Jackson, MS market with the arrival of the Mississippi Braves in nearby Pearl. This soon signaled the end of the Senators tenure in Jackson, as well as the end of professional baseball at Smith–Wills Stadium. Although the Senators (playing at Smith–Wills) competed directly with the M-Braves (playing at nearby Trustmark Park) with some success in the 2005 season, they did not return in 2006 due to the Central Baseball League disbanding following the 2005 season.

=== Jackson State University Tigers ===
For a short time while Jackson State University built an on-campus stadium of their own, the Tigers played games at Smith–Wills stadium.

=== Cotton State League ===
Smith–Wills Stadium hosted two teams in the short-lived Cotton State League in the mid-2000s. The wooden bat league was unique in that it provided local Mississippi college and university students the opportunity to play highly competitive summer league baseball.

=== Urban Baseball League ===
Smith–Wills Stadium will be the home of the proposed Urban Baseball League, a league created by former major league ballplayers Dennis "Oil Can" Boyd and Delino DeShields.

=== Belhaven University Baseball ===
Smith–Wills Stadium is currently the home of the Blazers of Belhaven University. The Blazers are an NCAA Division III team in the American Southwest Conference. The stadium was also used by the Blazers football team while the school built an on campus stadium.

== Possible demolition ==
The Smith–Wills Stadium site is often cited by Jackson city officials, as well as area developers as a possible location for a new multipurpose arena the city claims it desperately needs. The stadium's location near two of the metro areas main thoroughfares (Lakeland Drive and Interstate 55), its proximity to the majority of the Jackson Metropolitan Area's population base, as well as already having access to necessary infrastructure for replacement makes it a prime candidate for the city when such talks arise. Former mayor Frank Melton pushed for the city of Jackson to tear down the stadium and replace it with a 12,000-seat privately funded arena, but never garnered much support from the rest of his administration.
