= List of Major League Baseball players with a home run in their final major league at bat =

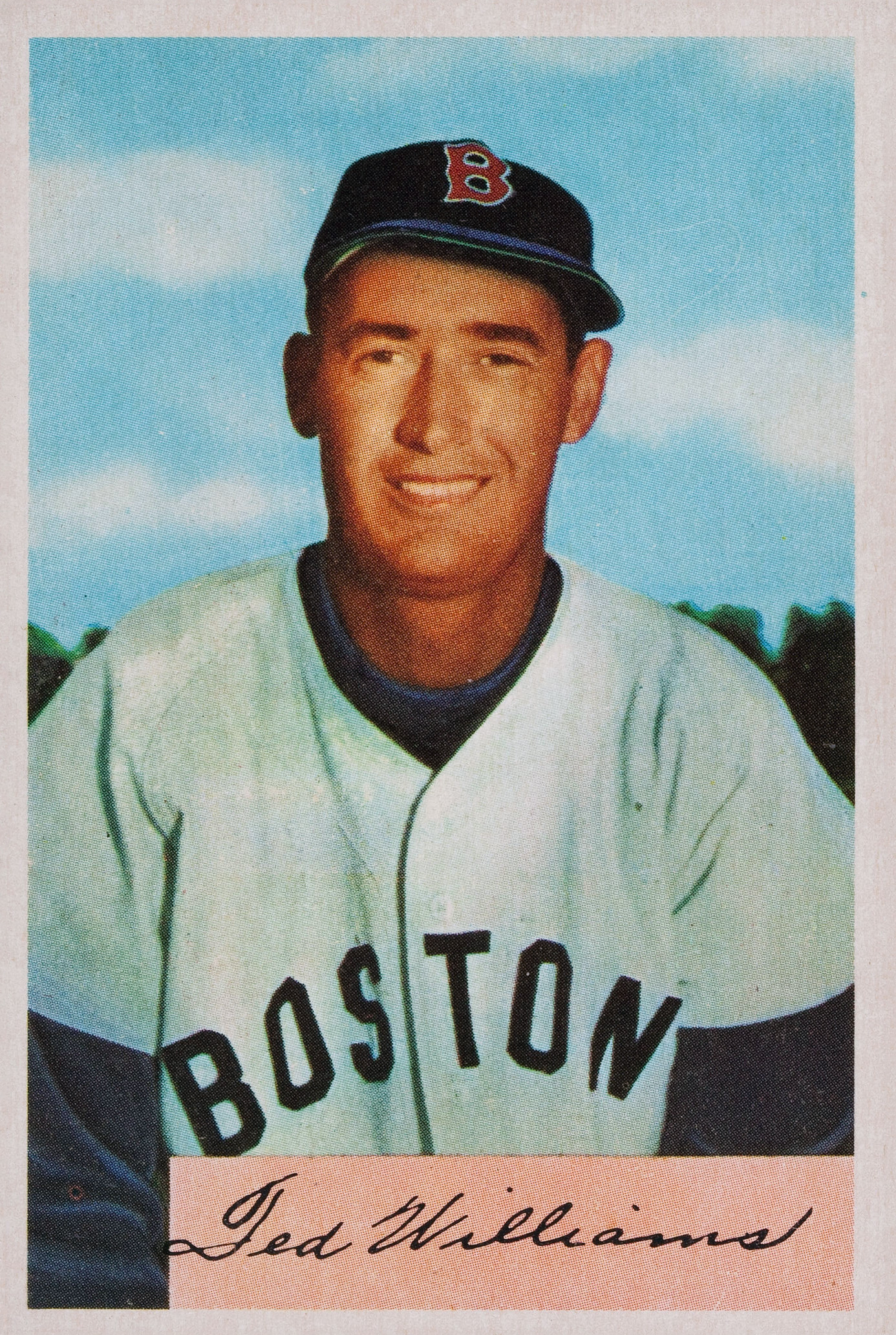
Ted Williams hit the 521st home run of his major-league career in his final at bat.

This is a list of the Major League Baseball (MLB) players who have hit a home run in their final major league at bat. The feat was first accomplished in 1890 by Buck West, and most recently by Stephen Vogt in 2022.

Paul Gillespie and John Miller are the only players in MLB history to hit home runs in their first and last major-league at bats. Miller's first and last major league at-bat home runs (off Lee Stange and Jim Merritt, respectively) were the only two home runs he hit in his MLB career. Bobby Kielty and David Ross both hit their final home runs in a World Series game—Kielty hit his for the Boston Red Sox in the series-clinching Game 4 of the 2007 World Series, while Ross's occurred in Game 7 of the 2016 World Series and was an important contribution to ending the 108 year title drought of the Chicago Cubs. Mickey Cochrane and Ted Williams are the only players on this list who are inductees of the National Baseball Hall of Fame.

== Players ==
Many players in the below list hit a home run the final time they batted in the last game of their professional career—that is, at the professional level, the player never batted again or played in another game—one notable example being Ted Williams. However, circumstances may vary—for example, Mickey Cochrane homered in his final at bat (hence his inclusion in the below list) but was hit by a pitch in his final plate appearance. Because pitchers bat less often than position players, especially since the introduction of the designated hitter, some pitchers in the below list played in many major-league games after their final at bat; for example, Tim Stoddard, who homered in his final at bat in June 1986, pitched in the major leagues through July 1989. In other cases, a player in the below list had a very brief major-league career, but continued playing professionally at the minor-league level—one example is Chris Jelic, who played in only four major-league games, all late in the 1990 season, then continued playing professionally through 1993.

Note: Baseball Almanac, the primary source for this section, lists and numbers players who have accomplished the feat during regular-season games, and provides separate commentary on players who have done so in postseason games.

Key
†	Inducted into the Baseball Hall of Fame
#	Denotes player was a pitcher

=== Regular season ===
No.	Player	Career total (Note: "Career total" figures refer to regular-season home runs only; home runs hit in all-star contests or postseason games are excluded.)	Date	Team
1	Buck West	3	September 18, 1890	Cleveland Spiders
2	Frank O'Connor #	1	August 7, 1893	Philadelphia Phillies
3	Hercules Burnett	2	September 29, 1895	Louisville Colonels
4	Ed Scott #	2	August 3, 1901	Cleveland Naps
5	Chick Stahl	36	October 6, 1906	Boston Americans
6	Del Gainer	14	September 30, 1922	St. Louis Cardinals
7	Mahlon Higbee	1	October 1, 1922	New York Giants
8	Walt Kinney #	2	May 9, 1923	Philadelphia Athletics
9	Johnny Schulte	14	September 20, 1932	Boston Braves
10	Mickey Cochrane^{†}	119	May 25, 1937	Detroit Tigers
11	George Jumonville	1	May 20, 1941	Philadelphia Phillies
12	Paul Gillespie	6	September 29, 1945	Chicago Cubs
13	Bert Haas	22	August 26, 1951	Chicago White Sox
14	Joe Frazier	10	September 30, 1956	Baltimore Orioles
15	Marv Blaylock	15	September 28, 1957	Philadelphia Phillies
16	Ron Samford	5	September 7, 1959	Washington Senators
17	Ted Williams^{†}	521	September 28, 1960	Boston Red Sox
18	Don Gile	3	September 30, 1962	Boston Red Sox
19	Ed Hobaugh #	1	September 2, 1963	Washington Senators
20	Tony Kubek	57	October 3, 1965	New York Yankees
21	John Miller	2	September 23, 1969	Los Angeles Dodgers
22	Ken McMullen	156	September 14, 1977	Milwaukee Brewers
23	Kevin Pasley	1	October 1, 1978	Seattle Mariners
24	Mike Cubbage	34	October 3, 1981	New York Mets
25	Joe Rudi	179	October 3, 1982	Oakland Athletics
26	Tony Brewer	1	September 30, 1984	Los Angeles Dodgers
27	Eddie Miller	1	September 30, 1984	San Diego Padres
28	Willie Aikens	110	April 27, 1985	Toronto Blue Jays
29	Rufino Linares	11	October 6, 1985	California Angels
30	Tim Stoddard #	1	June 18, 1986	San Diego Padres
31	Chris Jelic	1	October 3, 1990	New York Mets
32	Bobby Rose	5	May 19, 1992	California Angels
33	Glenn Braggs	70	September 10, 1992	Cincinnati Reds
34	Chico Walker	17	October 3, 1993	New York Mets
35	Jeff Tackett	7	August 2, 1994	Baltimore Orioles
36	Gregg Olson #	1	April 20, 1998	Arizona Diamondbacks
37	Tony Phillips	160	August 15, 1999	Oakland Athletics
38	Matt Mieske	56	September 30, 2000	Arizona Diamondbacks
39	Albert Belle	381	October 1, 2000	Baltimore Orioles
40	Dusty Allen	2	October 1, 2000	Detroit Tigers
41	Juan Díaz	1	June 23, 2002	Boston Red Sox
42	Ray Lankford	238	October 3, 2004	St. Louis Cardinals
43	Todd Zeile	253	October 3, 2004	New York Mets
44	Curtis Thigpen	1	September 26, 2008	Toronto Blue Jays
45	Gustavo Chacín #	1	May 31, 2010	Houston Astros
46	Jim Edmonds	393	September 21, 2010	Cincinnati Reds
47	Denis Phipps	1	September 23, 2012	Cincinnati Reds
48	Adam Kennedy	80	September 7, 2012	Los Angeles Dodgers
49	Juan Rivera	132	October 3, 2012	Los Angeles Dodgers
50	Ramón Hernández	169	June 12, 2013	Los Angeles Dodgers
51	Chad Tracy	86	September 28, 2013	Washington Nationals
52	Francisco Peguero	1	September 29, 2013	San Francisco Giants
53	Nyjer Morgan	12	May 11, 2014	Cleveland Indians
54	Brad Snyder	2	June 22, 2014	Texas Rangers
55	Nick Evans	10	July 27, 2014	Arizona Diamondbacks
56	Ramón Santiago	30	September 27, 2014	Cincinnati Reds
57	Corey Hart	162	June 21, 2015	Pittsburgh Pirates
58	Dan Uggla	235	October 3, 2015	Washington Nationals
59	Darrell Ceciliani	2	May 18, 2017	Toronto Blue Jays
60	Adonis García	29	October 1, 2017	Atlanta Braves
61	Bruce Maxwell	5	June 2, 2018	Oakland Athletics
62	Tyson Ross #	2	September 13, 2018	St. Louis Cardinals
63	Ian Kinsler (Note: Kinsler played in 1888 regular-season games, predominantly as a second baseman—he made one appearance as a pitcher, which was the final game of his career, in which he hit a home run in his final at bat.)	257	August 12, 2019	San Diego Padres
64	Ian Desmond	181	September 28, 2019	Colorado Rockies
65	Welington Castillo	98	September 29, 2019	Chicago White Sox
66	Ronny Rodríguez	19	September 29, 2019	Detroit Tigers
67	Khris Davis	221	October 3, 2021	Oakland Athletics
68	Jason Castro	97	June 29, 2022	Houston Astros
69	Stephen Vogt	82	October 5, 2022	Oakland Athletics

=== Postseason ===
No.	Player	Career total	Date	Team	Series / Game	Ref.
1	Chuck Carr	13	October 3, 1997	Houston Astros	1997 NLDS / Game 3	
2	Troy O'Leary	127	October 15, 2003	Chicago Cubs	2003 NLCS / Game 7	
3	Tom Wilson	15	October 5, 2004	Los Angeles Dodgers	2004 NLDS / Game 1	
4	Bobby Kielty	53	October 28, 2007	Boston Red Sox	2007 World Series / Game 4	
5	David Ross	106	November 2, 2016	Chicago Cubs	2016 World Series / Game 7	
6	Russell Martin	191	October 6, 2019	Los Angeles Dodgers	2019 NLDS / Game 3	

== See also ==
- List of Major League Baseball players with a home run in their first major league at bat
