= Steve Soliz =

American baseball coach

- Bullpen coach
- Born: January 27, 1971 (age 55); Ventura, California
- Bats: Right Throws: Right
- Stats at Baseball Reference

Teams
- Anaheim Angels / Los Angeles Angels of Anaheim / Los Angeles Angels (2003–2018)

Steven Soliz, Jr. (born January 27, 1971) is an American former Major League Baseball bullpen coach for the Los Angeles Angels of Anaheim. From 2003 to 2010, he was the Angels bullpen catcher. He played professionally from 1993 to 2000 in the Cleveland Indians and the San Diego Padres farm systems.

Sporting positions
Preceded by Orlando Mercado	Los Angeles Angels of Anaheim Bullpen Coach; 2010–2016	Succeeded by Scott Radinsky
