= Bud Harrelson =

American baseball player and manager (1944–2024)

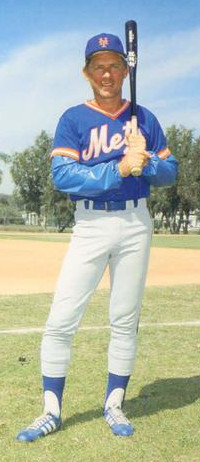
- Harrelson as a New York Mets coach in 1986
- Shortstop
- Born: June 6, 1944; Niles, California, U.S.
- Died: January 11, 2024 (aged 79); East Northport, New York, U.S.
- Batted: Switch Threw: Right

MLB debut
- September 2, 1965, for the New York Mets

Last MLB appearance
- October 5, 1980, for the Texas Rangers

MLB statistics
- Batting average: .236
- Home runs: 7
- Runs batted in: 267
- Stats at Baseball Reference
- Managerial record at Baseball Reference

Teams
- As player: New York Mets (1965–1977); Philadelphia Phillies (1978–1979); Texas Rangers (1980); As manager: New York Mets (1990–1991); As coach: New York Mets (1982, 1985–1990)

Career highlights and awards
- 2× All-Star (1970, 1971); 2× World Series champion (1969, 1986); Gold Glove Award (1971); New York Mets Hall of Fame

Derrel McKinley "Bud" Harrelson (June 6, 1944 – January 11, 2024) was an American professional baseball shortstop, coach and manager. He played in Major League Baseball (MLB) for the New York Mets, Philadelphia Phillies and Texas Rangers from 1965 to 1980. After his retirement as a player, he served as a coach for the 1986 Mets team that won the World Series, and as manager of the Mets in 1990 and 1991. He was a coach and part-owner of the Long Island Ducks of the Atlantic League of Professional Baseball.

Harrelson was inducted into the New York Mets Hall of Fame in 1986. He was the only person to take part in both of the Mets' World Series championships and appear in the first three World Series for the team; he won in 1969 and appeared in the 1973 World Series as a player and in 1986 as a coach. Harrelson is also the only person in Mets history to have appeared in four playoff seasons: as a player in 1969 and 1973 and as a coach in 1986 and 1988.

== Early life ==
Harrelson was born in Niles, California, on D-Day, June 6, 1944. His nickname of "Bud" came from his younger brother, who had trouble saying his name and instead called him "brother", which was shortened to "Bud". Harrelson was raised in Hayward, California, where he attended Sunset High School, graduating in 1962. He enrolled at San Francisco State University and, after one year, signed with the New York Mets as an amateur free agent in 1963.

== Playing career ==
=== New York Mets ===
The Mets promoted Harrelson to the major leagues on September 1, 1965, and he made his debut with the Mets the following day. Harrelson anchored the Mets' infield for 13 seasons, including their 1969 championship season and 1973 pennant-winning season. Weighing only 165 pounds (75 kg), Harrelson received the nicknames of "Twiggy", "Mighty Mouse" and "Mini Hawk" from his teammates. Typical of shortstops of his era, Harrelson was a good fielder but poor hitter. He had a lifetime batting average of .236 and hit a total of seven home runs during his 15-year major league career, but had a lifetime .969 fielding percentage and won a Gold Glove Award at his position in 1971. He was a National League All-Star in 1970 and 1971.

==== Amazin' Mets ====
On May 28, 1969, after a five-game losing streak that saw the Mets fall into fourth place in the newly aligned National League East, Harrelson hit an RBI single that won the game, beginning an 11-game team winning streak and a record of 82–39 over the rest of the season.

On September 10, the Mets jumped into first place for the first time in franchise history. On September 24, the team clinched the NL East with a 6–0 victory over Steve Carlton and the St. Louis Cardinals. The Mets won 38 of their last 50 games and finished the season with 100 wins against 62 losses, eight games over the second-place Chicago Cubs. Harrelson batted .248 with no home runs, 24 RBI and 42 runs scored. He had a .969 fielding percentage in 119 games at shortstop.

==== 1969 postseason ====
Harrelson's two hits in the 1969 National League Championship Series against the Atlanta Braves included a go-ahead triple in the fourth inning of the first game and an RBI double in Game 2 of the Mets' three-game sweep.

==== Fight with Pete Rose ====
Harrelson's light hitting became the subject of controversy during the 1973 National League Championship Series. Mets' starter Jon Matlack held the Cincinnati Reds to two hits in his 5–0 complete game victory in Game 2 of the series at Riverfront Stadium. Following the game, Harrelson commented, "He made the Big Red Machine look like me hitting today." Harrelson was confronted by Reds' second baseman Joe Morgan during pregame warmups for Game 3 and warned that Pete Rose was unhappy with the quote.

In the fifth inning, Rose's hard slide into second base sparked a bench-clearing brawl. The game was nearly forfeited when the Shea Stadium crowd threw objects at Rose, causing manager Sparky Anderson to remove the team from the field until order was restored. Mets' manager Yogi Berra and players Willie Mays, Tom Seaver, Cleon Jones and Rusty Staub walked to left field to attempt to calm the fans.

=== Phillies and Rangers ===
After the Mets reacquired former #1 overall pick Tim Foli, Harrelson was traded to the Philadelphia Phillies for Fred Andrews and cash on March 23, 1978. Rose and Bud became teammates with the Phillies but did not discuss the fight. The Phillies released Harrelson before the start of the 1980 season. He signed with the Texas Rangers in May after Rusty Staub broke a finger.

In 1986, Harrelson was inducted into the New York Mets Hall of Fame.

== Post-playing career ==
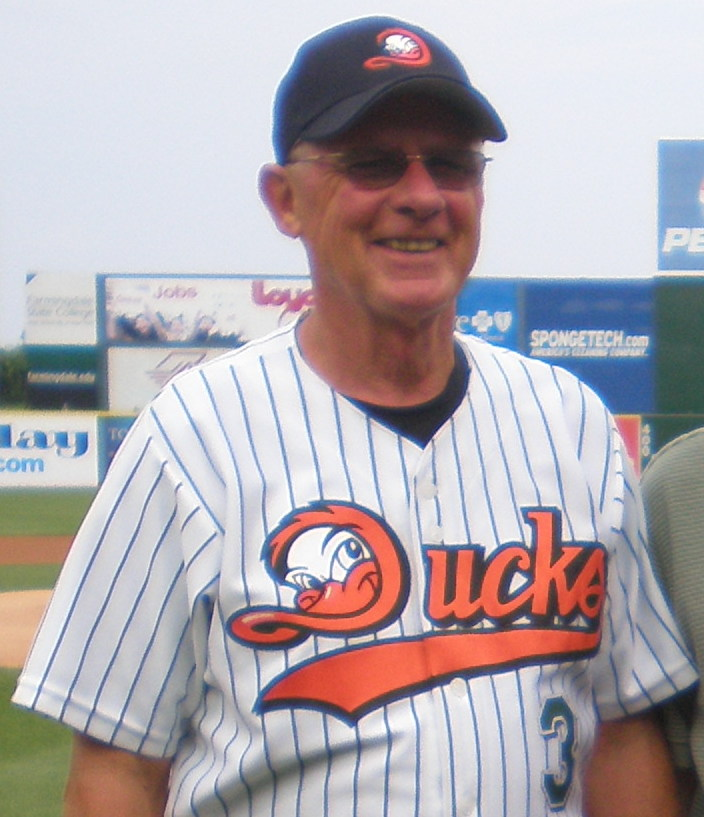
Harrelson with the Long Island Ducks in 2009

After his retirement, Harrelson joined the Mets' coaching staff as a first-base coach and infield instructor for the 1982 season. During the 1983 season, Harrelson substituted for Steve Zabriskie as a broadcaster on 60 Mets games covered by WWOR-TV. Harrelson managed the Little Falls Mets in 1984 and was named the New York–Penn League manager of the year. He managed the Columbia Mets of the South Atlantic League in 1985. When Mets' third base coach Bobby Valentine accepted a managerial position with the Texas Rangers during the 1985 season, Harrelson replaced him on Davey Johnson's coaching staff.

Harrelson was a coach with the Mets during their 1986 World Series championship season and replaced Johnson following his dismissal as the Mets' manager 42 games into the 1990 season. He led the Mets to their seventh consecutive winning season, finishing at 91–71. During the 1990 season, Harrelson hosted a WFAN radio show called The Bud Harrelson Report but ended it early in the 1991 season because he felt that some of Howie Rose's questions were too negative.

Although the Mets were contenders for most of the first half of the 1991 season and as close as 2.5 games behind the eventual division-winning Pittsburgh Pirates, the team collapsed in the second half and Harrelson was fired with a week remaining in the season. He was replaced by his third base coach Mike Cubbage, and the Mets finished in fifth place at 77–84.

In 2000, Harrelson became part-owner of the Long Island Ducks, a newly formed independent league baseball team. He managed the Ducks that year in their inaugural season, and became a coach for the Ducks' home games in their second season. The team retired Harrelson's number 3 uniform in 2018.

== Personal life ==
Harrelson married his first wife Yvonne on December 17, 1965. They later divorced, and Harrelson married Kim Battaglia in 1975. His children are Kimberly, Timothy, Alexandra, Kassandra and Troy Joseph. Harrelson was inducted into the Suffolk Sports Hall of Fame on Long Island in the baseball category in 1992. He appeared as himself in a 1999 episode of Everybody Loves Raymond along with several other members of the 1969 Mets. Harrelson resided in East Northport and Hauppauge, New York.

Harrelson was diagnosed with Alzheimer's disease in 2016 and publicly disclosed his diagnosis in 2018. He died at a hospice in East Northport, New York on January 11, 2024, at age 79.
