= Dave Liddell =

American baseball player (born 1966)

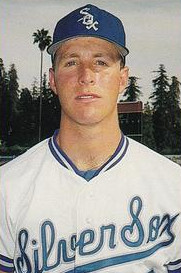
- Liddell in 1988
- Catcher
- Born: June 15, 1966 (age 60); Los Angeles
- Batted: Right Threw: Right

MLB debut
- June 3, 1990, for the New York Mets

Last MLB appearance
- June 3, 1990, for the New York Mets

MLB statistics
- Batting average: 1.000
- Home runs: 0
- Runs batted in: 0
- Stats at Baseball Reference

Teams
- New York Mets (1990)

David Alexander Liddell (born June 15, 1966) is an American former Major League Baseball catcher. He caught one game for the New York Mets in 1990. He hit a single in his only Major League at bat, on June 3, 1990, giving him a lifetime batting average of 1.000. His Major League slugging percentage and on-base percentage are also 1.000. His at bat came in the 8th inning of a game against the Philadelphia Phillies as a pinch hitter for Mets' catcher Mackey Sasser against pitcher Pat Combs. His hit came on the only Major League pitch he ever faced; author George Rose estimates that his Major League career as a hitter thus lasted only about 20 seconds. He scored a run later in the inning. He also caught one inning with one putout for a lifetime fielding percentage of 1.000.

Liddell had been called up to the majors on June 3 due to the death of backup catcher Orlando Mercado's father. Pitcher Wally Whitehurst was sent to the minors to clear roster space for Liddell and after the minimum ten days that Whitehurst was required to remain in the minors, Whitehurst was recalled and Liddell was sent back to the Tidewater Tides for the remainder of the season. After the 1990 season, he was signed by the Cincinnati Reds as a free agent, but he never played in the Reds' system.

Liddell was a 4th round draft pick of the Chicago Cubs in 1984 – the 83rd overall pick in the draft – after attending Rubidoux High School in Riverside, California. He was traded to Mets with minor league pitcher Dave Lenderman on June 30, 1986, in exchange for pitcher Ed Lynch. He also played in the Milwaukee Brewers' and Baltimore Orioles' organizations. In 529 minor league games between 1984 and 1992 he had a batting average of .215 with 24 home runs and at least 109 runs batted in in 1505 at bats. He had a minor league slugging percentage of .309. He also pitched in one game for the unaffiliated Reno Silver Sox in 1988, giving up one run in 2/3 of an inning. He also played as a first baseman in 13 games over the course of his minor league career. Liddell played in 18 games for the 1986 South Atlantic League champion Columbia Mets and 32 games for the 1991 American Association champion Denver Zephyrs.
