= Buck West =

American baseball player (1860–1929)

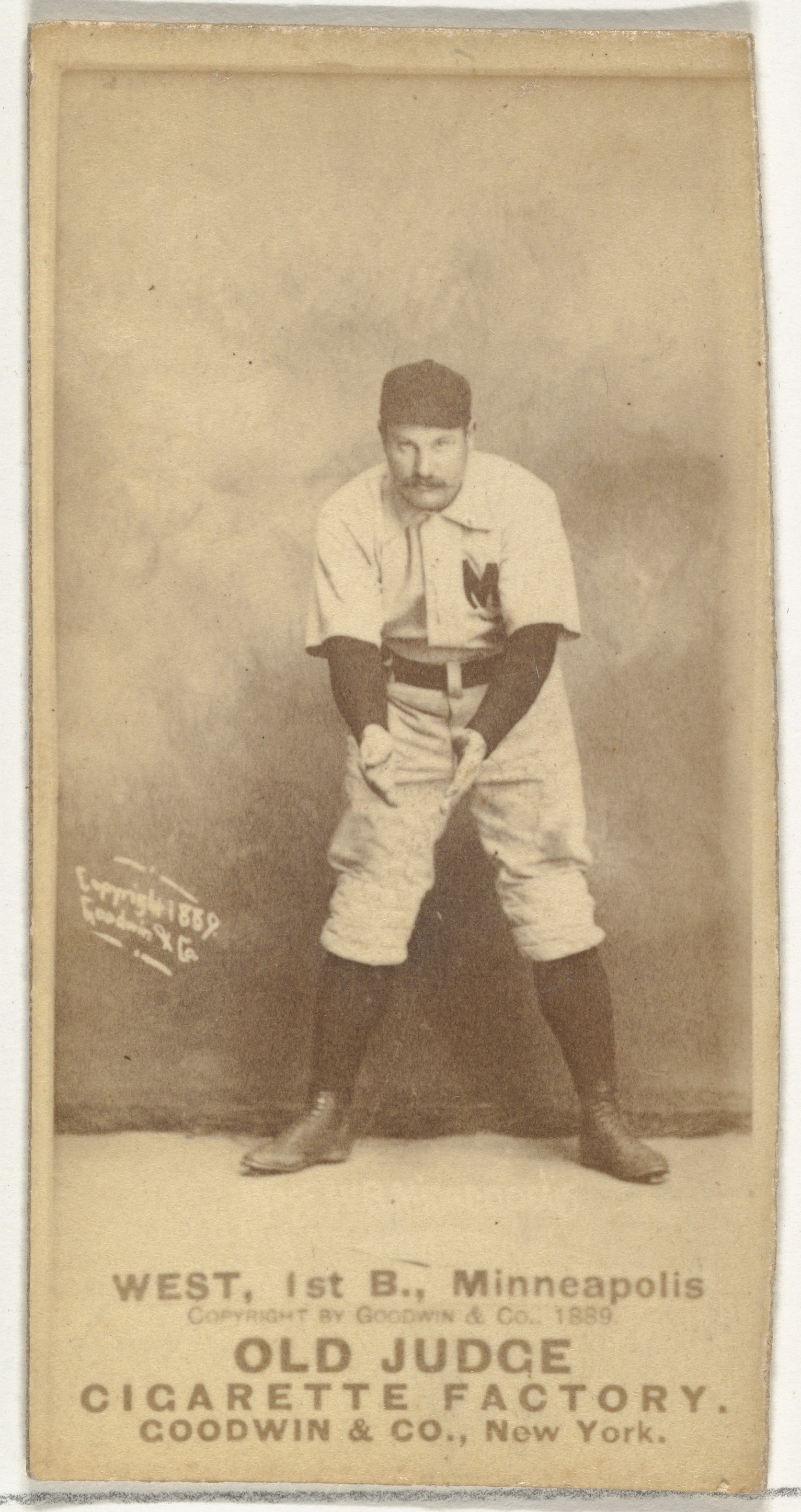
- Outfielder
- Born: August 29, 1860; Spring Mill, Ohio, U.S.
- Died: January 13, 1929 (aged 68); Mansfield, Ohio, U.S.
- Batted: Left Threw: Right

MLB debut
- August 24, 1884, for the Cincinnati Red Stockings

Last MLB appearance
- September 18, 1890, for the Cleveland Spiders

MLB statistics
- At bats: 282
- Batting average: .245
- RBI: 40
- Stats at Baseball Reference

Teams
- Cincinnati Red Stockings (1884); Cleveland Spiders (1890)

Milton Douglas "Buck" West (August 29, 1860 – January 13, 1929) was an American Major League Baseball outfielder. West played for the Cincinnati Red Stockings in 1884 and the Cleveland Spiders in 1890. Both seasons were ones with three major leagues.

West played for the Northwestern League champion Saginaw Old Golds in early 1884. After the league folded, he joined the Red Stockings.

West was the first major leaguer ever to hit a home run in his final at bat.

After his baseball career ended, West went into the retail liquor business and also engaged in a restaurant enterprise.

== See also ==
- List of Major League Baseball players with a home run in their final major league at bat
