= Darryl Strawberry =

American baseball player (born 1962)

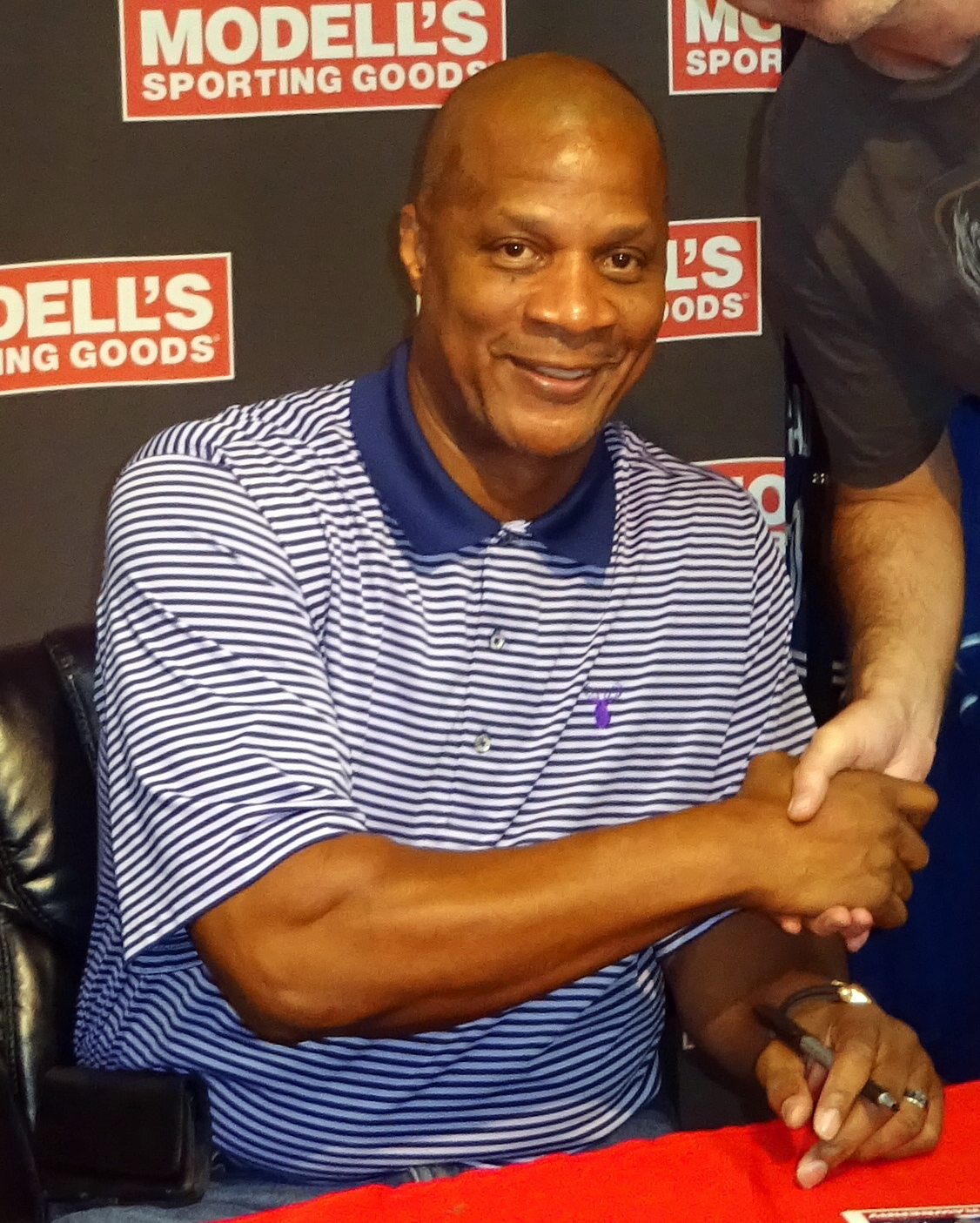
- Strawberry in 2016
- Right fielder
- Born: March 12, 1962 (age 64); Los Angeles, California, U.S.
- Batted: Left Threw: Left

MLB debut
- May 6, 1983, for the New York Mets

Last MLB appearance
- October 3, 1999, for the New York Yankees

MLB statistics
- Batting average: .259
- Home runs: 335
- Runs batted in: 1,000
- Stats at Baseball Reference

Teams
- New York Mets (1983–1990); Los Angeles Dodgers (1991–1993); San Francisco Giants (1994); New York Yankees (1995–1999)

Career highlights and awards
- 8× All-Star (1984–1991); 3× World Series champion (1986, 1996, 1999); NL Rookie of the Year (1983); 2× Silver Slugger Award (1988, 1990); NL home run leader (1988); New York Mets No. 18 retired; New York Mets Hall of Fame

Darryl Eugene Strawberry Sr. (born March 12, 1962) is an American former professional baseball right fielder who played 17 seasons in Major League Baseball (MLB). Throughout his career, Strawberry was one of the most feared sluggers in the sport, known for his prodigious home runs and his intimidating presence in the batter's box with his 6 ft 6 in (1.98 m) frame and his long, looping swing that elicited comparisons to Ted Williams.

Strawberry, who was nicknamed "the Straw Man" or "Straw", helped lead the New York Mets to a World Series championship in 1986 over the Boston Red Sox and the New York Yankees to two World Series championships in 1996 and 1999, both over the Atlanta Braves. Although he did not play in the 1998 World Series, Strawberry was issued a 1998 World Series championship ring because he played for the Yankees during the season. He was suspended three times by MLB for substance abuse, leaving many to believe his massive potential went unfulfilled. A popular player during his career, Strawberry was voted to the All-Star Game eight straight times from 1984 to 1991. Strawberry was formerly an analyst for SportsNet New York. His memoir, Straw: Finding My Way, written with author John Strausbaugh, was published in April 2009.

== Early life and education ==
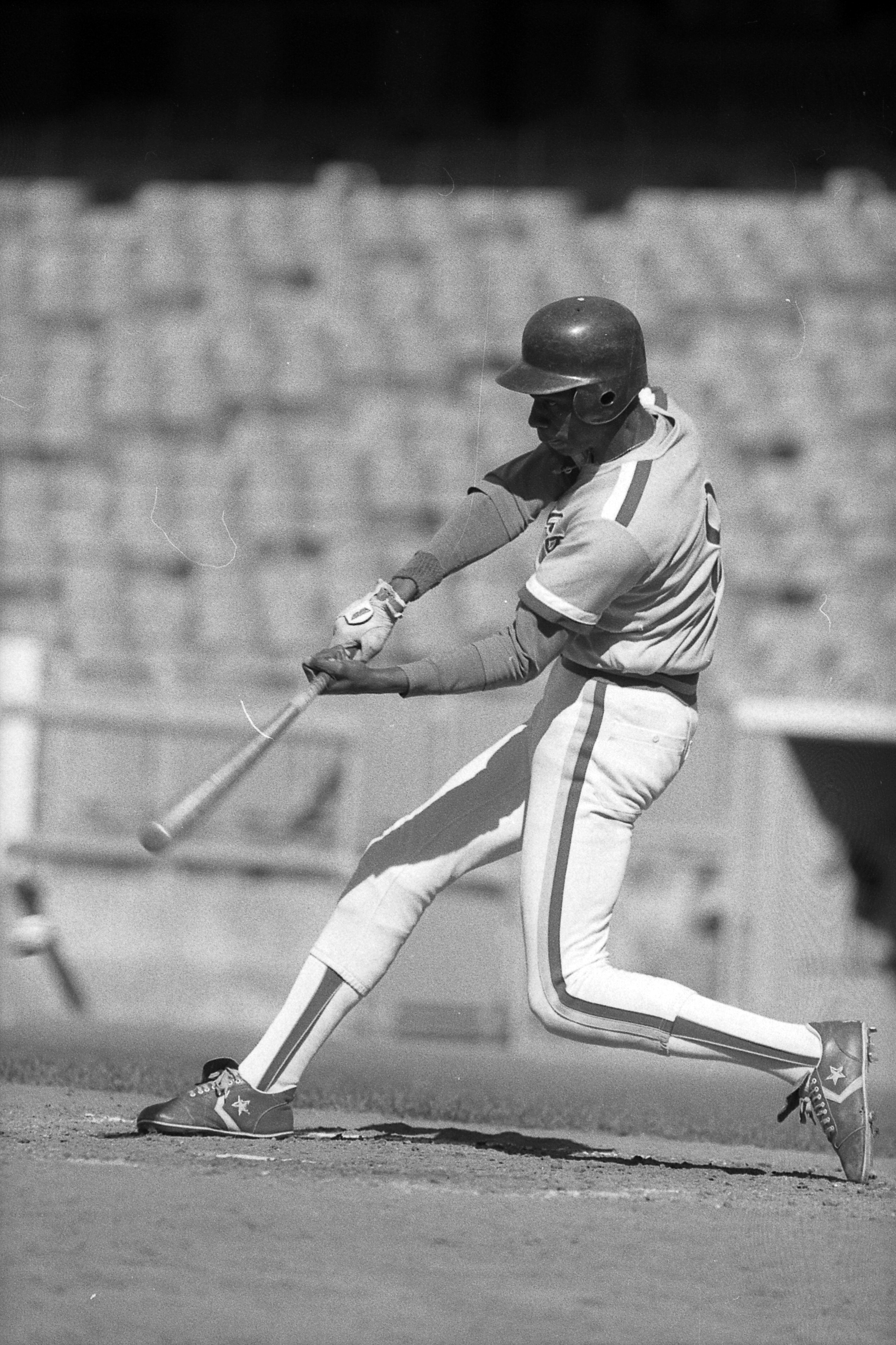
Strawberry playing for Crenshaw High School in 1980

Strawberry was born to Henry and Ruby Strawberry in Los Angeles, California. He played high school baseball for the Crenshaw High School Cougars along with Chris Brown. As an 18-year-old from Los Angeles' Crenshaw High School, Strawberry signed a letter of intent with Oklahoma State, to play baseball for Gary Ward. However, a couple of months later, Strawberry was the first overall pick in the amateur draft, and he signed with the Mets in July 1980. Darryl's older brother Michael Strawberry was also a star athlete who went on to play professional baseball.

== Professional baseball career ==
=== Early career ===
The New York Mets selected Strawberry with the first overall selection in the 1980 Major League Baseball draft. Darryl's older brother, Michael Strawberry, was also selected in that draft, going to the Dodgers in the 31st round.

Employing a distinctive batting stance with a high leg kick, Strawberry rose through the Mets system and reached the major league level in 1983, posting 26 home runs, 7 triples, and 74 runs batted in, while hitting for a .257 average. He was named the National League's Rookie of The Year. In 1984, he made it to the All-Star game for the first of 8 consecutive appearances (the first 5 as a starter), and he once again hit 26 home runs, this time driving in 97 runs.

=== Prime years ===
Strawberry's Mets from 1984–1990 formed one of the premier teams in the National League, finishing either first or second in the division every year.

During the period from 1983 to 1990, Strawberry was very popular, with his image used on action figures (Kenner's Starting Lineup), posters and banners.

On May 11, 1985, Strawberry suffered torn ligaments in his thumb, making a diving catch off of Ozzie Virgil of the Philadelphia Phillies. This required surgery, and Strawberry missed the team's next 43 games, not returning until June 28. The injury was devastating to the Mets, who went only 20–23 (.465) without Strawberry (as opposed to 78–41 [.655] in all other games) and lost the National League East title to the St. Louis Cardinals by only three games.

On October 1, 1985, the Mets began a 3-game series in St. Louis, trailing the Cardinals by three games with only six remaining to play. It seemed that they would need to sweep the series in order to have a chance at the title. After starting pitchers Ron Darling of the Mets and John Tudor of the Cardinals dueled scorelessly into extra innings, Strawberry provided the only run of the Mets' 1–0 victory in the 11th inning, hitting a massive home run off of Ken Dayley that hit the clock on the scoreboard in the right field stands of Busch Stadium. (The Mets won the next game, 5–2, behind Dwight Gooden, but lost the final game, 4–3, despite five hits by Keith Hernandez.) For the season, Strawberry hit 29 home runs and drove in 79 runs; his .947 OPS would have been 2nd in the National League (behind Pedro Guerrero of the Los Angeles Dodgers) if the injury had not limited him to 470 plate appearances.

The 1986 Mets jumped to an early lead (a 4-game sweep of the Cardinals in St. Louis was pivotal) and cruised easily to the divisional title, setting a team record with 108 wins. Strawberry hit 27 home runs and had 93 RBIs, as the Mets defeated the Houston Astros in the National League Championship Series and rallied after losing the first two games at home to defeat the Boston Red Sox in the World Series. With the Mets having rallied to take a 6–5 lead in the 8th inning of Game 7, Strawberry hit a home run off of Al Nipper to seal the victory and the series. He took a notably slow home run trot around the bases, leading to Nipper throwing at him and igniting a brawl between the teams during spring training, the next season.

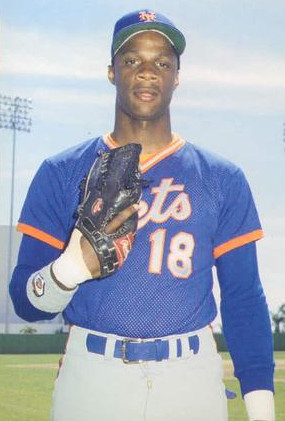
Strawberry in 1986

In 1987, Strawberry hit 39 home runs and stole 36 bases, joining the exclusive 30–30 club at the time becoming one of only 10 players in baseball history to accomplish the feat. (Teammate Howard Johnson [36 HR, 32 SB] also accomplished the feat; to this day, Strawberry and Johnson are the only teammates to have ever gone 30/30 in the same season.) In addition to that, he hit 32 doubles and drove in 104 runs. Despite this, the 1987 team, plagued by pitching injuries, missed the playoffs.

On Opening Day in 1988, Strawberry hit a massive home run (estimated at 525 ft.) that struck the roof of Olympic Stadium in Montreal. For the season, Strawberry once again hit 39 home runs (despite a general decline in home run totals in all of baseball from the atypical 1987 season) to lead the National League. Strawberry also led the league in slugging percentage at .545 and OPS at .911 and finished second with 101 runs batted in. He finished a very close second in MVP voting to the Dodgers' Kirk Gibson. Strawberry led the Mets to the playoffs, losing to the Dodgers in seven games in the National League Championship Series.

In 1989, Strawberry's offensive numbers declined: he had 29 home runs and 77 runs batted in, but only had a .225 average. Nevertheless, the Mets came in a close second place to the Chicago Cubs in the National League East.

In 1990, Strawberry rebounded by hitting 37 home runs, driving in 108 runs and batting for a .277 average. His Mets, however, came once again in a close second place in the National League East, losing to the Pittsburgh Pirates by three games. Strawberry himself finished third in MVP voting that season.

Despite his accomplishments, Strawberry was sometimes criticized for disruptive behavior. He got into a physical altercation on team picture day with team captain Keith Hernandez and in the midst of a war of words with infielder Wally Backman, threatened to "bust that little redneck in the face". On multiple occasions, he overslept and was late for, or missed, team workouts.

Strawberry signed as a free agent with the Los Angeles Dodgers on November 8, 1990, inking a lucrative five-year $22.25 million contract. After hitting 28 home runs and bringing in 99 runs batted in a successful first year for the Dodgers, injuries and personal problems kept him sidelined for much of the next two seasons, hitting five home runs in each season.

By the end of the 1991 season, he had 280 lifetime homers at the age of only 29, drawing comparisons to then home run king Hank Aaron. His 252 home runs as a Met stood as a club record until 2025, when Pete Alonso surpassed him.

=== Later years ===
Strawberry's numbers tailed off considerably after 1991; over the next two years he only played in 75 games. In 1994, he was released in May by the Dodgers after failing to show up to a game. Later that season he signed with the San Francisco Giants, where he saw limited playing time as he tried to make a comeback, hitting only four home runs and driving in 17 runs that year.

After a suspension at the beginning of 1995 after testing positive for cocaine, Strawberry signed with the New York Yankees for the stretch run. The next year, Darryl signed with the Saint Paul Saints of the Northern League on May 3, 1996, in an attempt to rehabilitate. On June 2, the Saints faced the Duluth–Superior Dukes at Wade Stadium, where Strawberry hit his first home run for the Saints, at a distance of 522' off pitcher Pat Ahearne. Soon thereafter, he found himself back with the Yankees, who signed him on July 4, 1996.

With the Yankees, he showed flashes of his former brilliance, belting 11 home runs in a part-time role and helping his team win the World Series in 1996 alongside former Mets teammates Dwight Gooden and David Cone. His second career three-homer game came against the Chicago White Sox on August 6 of that season.

He had a big series against the Baltimore Orioles in the 1996 ALCS as he blasted three home runs with five RBIs and a .417 average in four games. In 1997, he did not have any home runs, with his playing time limited by injuries. He played in just 11 games that year, collecting just two runs batted in.

In 1998, he had 24 home runs, once again helping the Yankees win the World Series and playing 100 games for the first time since 1991. However, he suffered abdominal pain for around two months, which he did not disclose to his teammates or staff, and his playing time declined late in the season. Strawberry was diagnosed with colon cancer during the American League Division Series (ALDS), and he was replaced on the roster by rookie Ricky Ledée. In 1999, he made a comeback from his cancer treatment, but saw limited playing time, hitting 3 home runs. He did however hit a crucial 3-run home run against the Texas Rangers in the ALDS, helping the Yankees advance to the ALCS.

Strawberry was set to return to the Yankees in 2000, but after testing positive for cocaine in February while attending spring training, Strawberry was ordered to leave the team while waiting for commissioner Bud Selig to make a decision on a possible suspension. Six days after news of the positive test broke, Selig announced that Strawberry would be suspended for the entire 2000 season, effectively ending his career.

=== Career accomplishments ===
Strawberry was the starting right fielder in five straight All-Star games and appeared in a total of nine All-Star games. He batted .333 with two stolen bases and two runs in 12 career All-Star at-bats. He had two three-home run games in his career, both of which came against Chicago teams and were almost 11 years to the day between each other. The first came against the Cubs on August 5, 1985, and the second was on August 6, 1996, against the White Sox.

He is one of only five Major League Baseball players to hit two pinch-hit grand slams in the same season. The others are his former coach Davey Johnson, who did it as a member of the Philadelphia Phillies, as well as Mike Ivie of the San Francisco Giants, Ben Broussard of the Cleveland Indians, and Brooks Conrad of the Atlanta Braves.

He is one of only three players in MLB history, along with former Yankees teammate Ricky Ledée and José Vizcaíno, to have played for all four of the former and current New York-based MLB teams: the Mets, Yankees, Dodgers and Giants. However, of the three, Strawberry is the only one to have played solely for the four teams with New York heritage; Ledée and Vizcaino were journeymen who played for numerous other teams.

== Post-playing life ==
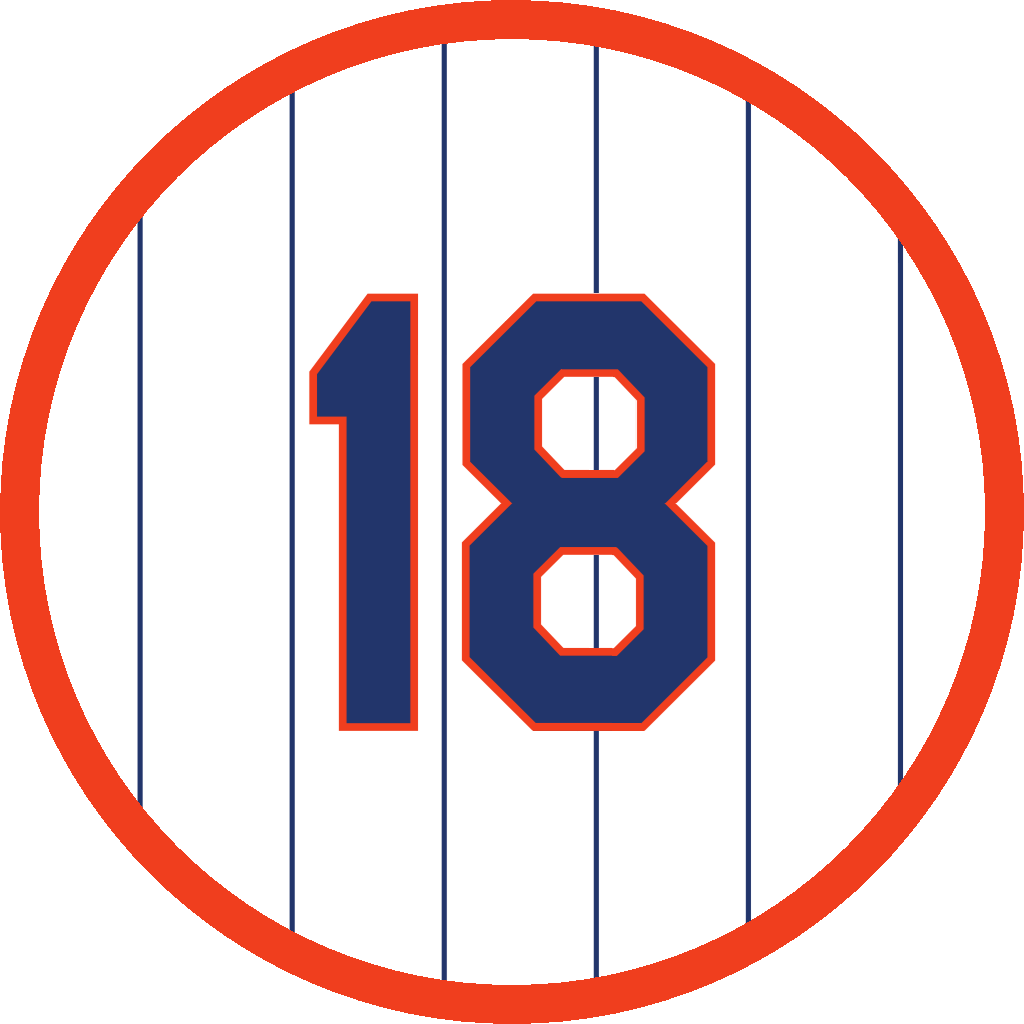
Darryl Strawberry's number 18 was retired by the New York Mets in 2024.

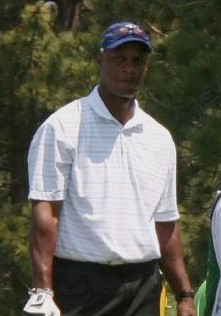
Darryl Strawberry, American Century Celebrity Golf Classic, July 13, 2008

Strawberry attended the Mets' 1986 World Champion team reunion on August 19, 2006, where the team received a standing ovation from fans at Shea Stadium in an on-field ceremony. He worked as an instructor for the New York Mets in 2005 and 2008, and was inducted to the Mets Hall of Fame in 2010.

He has made regular appearances at the New York Yankees' Old Timer's Day, most recently in 2023.

He threw out the ceremonial first pitch at Shea Stadium before Game 1 of the National League Championship Series between the Mets and the St. Louis Cardinals on October 12, 2006. He was given a rousing ovation by the Shea Stadium crowd. He served as an anchor on the Mets pre- and post- game shows on SNY in 2007 and 2008, eventually settling into a part-time analysis role for the 2009 season.

He opened his own restaurant, Strawberry's Sports Grill, in Douglaston, Queens in August 2010. The restaurant closed in October 2012.

On August 24, 2023, the Mets announced plans to retire Strawberry's number 18 - along with the number 16 of former teammate Dwight Gooden - in a ceremony during the 2024 baseball season. His number was retired on June 1, 2024. In his acceptance speech, Strawberry apologized to Mets fans for leaving to sign with the Dodgers, saying it was "the greatest mistake I ever made".

== Personal life ==
Strawberry is an evangelical born-again Christian and has appeared on the Trinity Broadcasting Network. In 1999, he and Tiny Lister appeared on evangelist Benny Hinn's television program giving their testimonies. Strawberry has also appeared on The 700 Club to talk about his life and his newfound Christian faith. He eventually became an ordained minister.

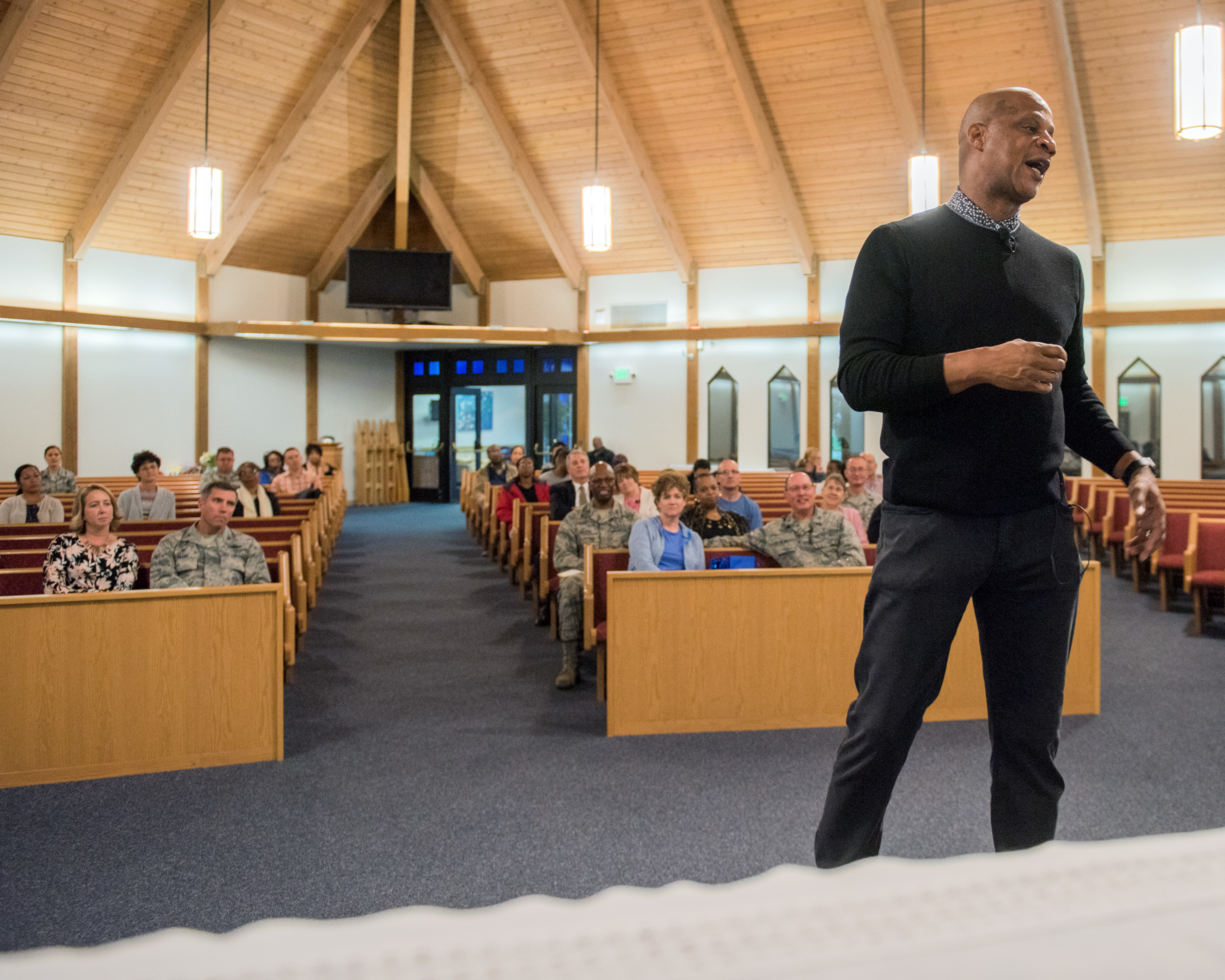
Strawberry speaking in a chapel at Travis Air Force Base in 2018

Strawberry frequently donates to charity and was a headliner of the BGC Charity Day event at BGC Partners in 2010. In 1991, Strawberry was named Southern California Big Brother of The Year, an award recognized his community involvement and youth outreach, including his role as a spokesman for inner-city baseball.

In October 2005, his wife Charisse filed for divorce. After a second divorce, he married his third wife, Tracy Boulware, in October 2006; the couple met at a drug recovery convention and they share a vigorous Christian faith.

In 2006, he and Tracy moved to St. Peters, Missouri. The couple founded "The Darryl Strawberry Foundation", an organization dedicated to children with autism. Strawberry's son, Darryl "D.J." Strawberry Jr., born in 1985, was a star shooting guard with the Maryland Terrapins men's basketball team and was drafted by the Phoenix Suns in the 2007 NBA draft. Strawberry has another son, Jordan, who played college basketball for the Mercer Bears.

Strawberry has stated that his father was an alcoholic who was verbally and physically abusive to him and his brothers. He attributes his initial alcohol and drug use to the pain he endured as a child and his subsequent substance abuse to the pressures of performing in New York.

On September 26, 2020, Strawberry led a prayer in the 2020 Franklin Graham Prayer March. On 5 May 2026, Strawberry led a prayer at the 44th Battle Creek Community Prayer Breakfast.

=== Legal and health problems ===
Strawberry has described himself as having struggled with a sex addiction. After retirement he admitted to routinely having sex between innings of MLB games in which he played.

On December 9, 1994, Strawberry was indicted on one count of income tax conspiracy and two counts of tax evasion for failing to pay $146,000 in income taxes from 1986 to 1990, stemming from failing to report $502,043 made at card shows and other appearances. On February 10, 1995, in a plea deal, Strawberry pled guilty to one count of tax evasion. On November 7, 2025, he was pardoned by President Donald Trump for this 1995 tax evasion conviction, for which he had served 6 months of home confinement and two years of probation.

On December 19, 1995, Strawberry was charged in California with failing to make child support payments. When he missed a June 5, 1996, deadline to pay the child support, a Los Angeles judge set a trial date of July 17, at which time Strawberry agreed to use his signing bonus to pay the debt.

In August 1998, Strawberry was sued by attorney Robert Shapiro for failing to pay $100,000 in legal fees, dating back to 1994, when Shapiro represented him in a contract with the Dodgers.

On October 1, 1998, Strawberry was diagnosed with colon cancer. Two days later, he had surgery to remove a tumor. On October 14, doctors announced that cancer had been detected in a lymph node so he would also have to undergo chemotherapy.

On April 3, 1999, Strawberry was arrested in Tampa, Florida for soliciting sex from a policewoman posing as a prostitute and for having a small amount of cocaine. On April 24, he was suspended for 140 days by Major League Baseball for the incident. On May 29, he pleaded no contest to the charges and was sentenced to 21 months probation and community service.

On July 28, 2000, a C.T. scan suggested that Strawberry's cancer had spread to his lymph nodes. The next month, he had surgery to remove a tumor near his left kidney on August 7.

On September 11, 2000, in Tampa, Florida, Strawberry tried to drive to see his probation officer after taking painkillers. While driving, he blacked out, rear-ended another car, and then tried to drive away. An off-duty police officer witnessed the episode and arrested him at gunpoint. The next day, Strawberry admitted to the charges and his probation was changed to two years of house arrest. On November 21, he was sentenced to a year of probation and community service. On October 25, 2000, Strawberry left a Tampa drug treatment center to use drugs with a female friend, violating his house arrest and parole. On November 9, he was sentenced to 40 days in jail with credit for time served. On November 3, 2000, Strawberry told a judge in Tampa that he had lost his will to live and had stopped chemotherapy. On November 30, he was released from jail and sent back to rehab. On April 2, 2001, Strawberry was arrested for again disappearing from his house arrest drug treatment center in Tampa. On May 1, he was sentenced to more time at a drug treatment center.

On March 12, 2002, Strawberry was back in jail for violating several non-drug rules at the drug treatment center where he was on probation in Ocala, Florida. On April 29, he was ordered to serve the 22-month suspended prison sentence from 1999. On April 8, 2003, he was released from prison after 11 months.

In September 2005, Strawberry was charged with filing a false police report after he claimed his SUV was stolen. He admitted that he had lied on the report but was not arrested because it was a misdemeanor.

On or about March 11, 2024, Strawberry suffered a heart attack, underwent a stent procedure and reported that he was recovering in a hospital in Lake St. Louis, Missouri. He recovered and was able to attend the ceremony where the Mets retired Gooden's number 16 on April 14, as well as his own retirement ceremony on June 1.

== In media ==
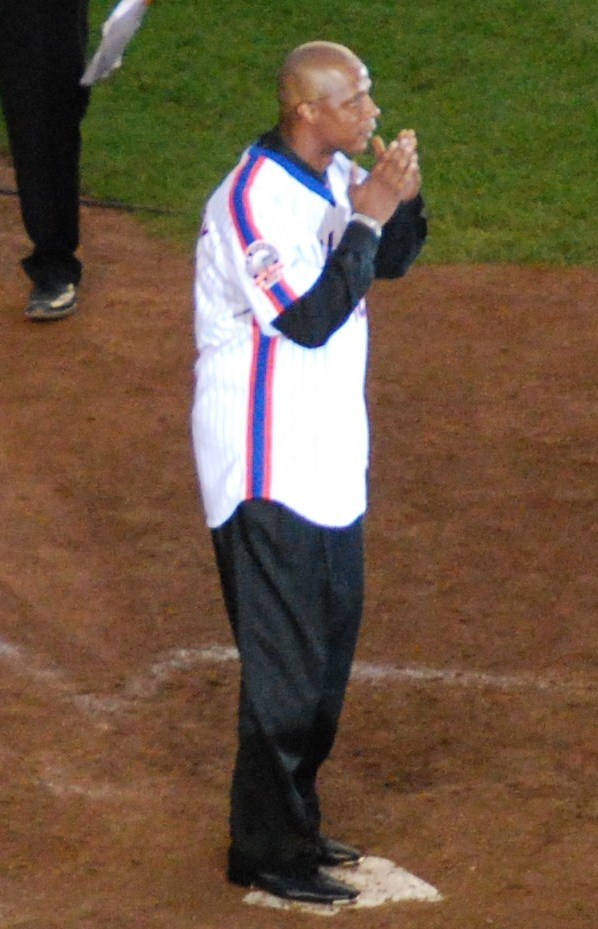
Strawberry at Shea Stadium in 2008

Strawberry appeared on the cover of Sports Illustrated seven times: five times by himself, once with Don Mattingly, and once with Dwight Gooden.

In 1988, he was featured heavily in the William Goldman and Mike Lupica book Wait Till Next Year, which looked at life inside the Mets over a whole season (among other New York sports teams). It gives a frank account of both his importance to the team and his problematic behavior.

In 1992 Darryl Strawberry was mentioned in Adam Sandlers "The Thanksgiving Song" where Adam says "Can't believe the Mets traded Darryl Strawberry." tho Strawberry signed as a free agent for the Los Angeles Dodgers not traded.

In 2004, the Rebecca Gilman play The Sweetest Swing in Baseball premiered at the Royal Court Theatre in London. The lead character ‒ Dana, as portrayed by Gillian Anderson ‒ adopts the personality and speech of Darryl Strawberry in an attempt to pass herself off as schizophrenic. The title is a reference to Strawberry's beautiful swing.

Strawberry appeared, as himself, in The Simpsons episode "Homer at the Bat". He was a featured pro on the second season of the physical reality game show Pros vs. Joes. He currently does occasional commentary for baseball on SportsNet New York.

In 2010, Strawberry appeared on NBC's The Apprentice with Sharon Osbourne, Cyndi Lauper, Bret Michaels, and others. At the end of the third episode, Strawberry was fired after he admitted he was the weakest contestant, was tired, and wanted to go home. Donald Trump sent him home. After Strawberry made a successful return in the season finale to assist Bret Michaels, the show made a donation of $25,000 to The Darryl Strawberry Foundation. Strawberry placed 12th.

On February 8, 2011, Strawberry appeared along with Clara Hughes and Stephane Richer on a Canadian documentary by Michael Landsberg to talk about his battle with depression.

On Wednesday, November 15, 2017, Strawberry appeared on The Tonight Show Starring Jimmy Fallon to talk about his new book Don't Give Up on Me, which sheds light on addiction and recovery.

On September 26, 2025, Strawberry was a guest on the "All the Smoke" podcast where he talked with hosts Stephen Jackson and Matt Barnes about his career, what it was like playing in New York in the '80s, and key moments in his career.

== See also ==
- List of Major League Baseball annual home run leaders
- List of Major League Baseball career home run leaders
- List of Major League Baseball career runs batted in leaders

Preceded by Andre Dawson	National League Player of the Month; September 1987	Succeeded by Bobby Bonilla
