= Paul Gillespie =

American baseball player (1920–1970)

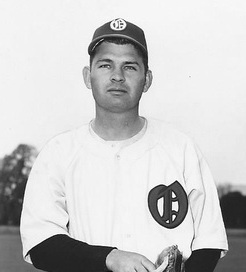
- Gillespie, circa 1947
- Catcher
- Born: September 18, 1920; Gordon County, Georgia, U.S.
- Died: August 11, 1970 (aged 49); Anniston, Alabama, U.S.
- Batted: Left Threw: Right

MLB debut
- September 11, 1942, for the Chicago Cubs

Last MLB appearance
- September 30, 1945, for the Chicago Cubs

MLB statistics
- Batting average: .283
- Home runs: 6
- Runs batted in: 31
- Stats at Baseball Reference

Teams
- Chicago Cubs (1942, 1944–1945)

Paul Allen Gillespie (September 18, 1920 – August 11, 1970) was an American Major League Baseball catcher for the Chicago Cubs in 1942, 1944, and 1945. A native of the Sugar Valley Community in Gordon County, Georgia, he stood 6 ft 3 in (1.91 m) and weighed 195 lbs.

Gillespie is one of many ballplayers who only appeared in the major leagues during World War II. He was a key reserve on the Chicago Cubs pennant-winning team in 1945. That was his best season, as he appeared in 75 games and hit .288 with three home runs, 25 runs batted in, and 12 runs scored. He played great defense, making just two errors in 45 appearances at catcher.

Gillespie hit a home run in his first major league at bat, doing so against the New York Giants at the Polo Grounds on September 11, 1942. He also hit a home run in his final regular season major league at bat, on September 29, 1945, against the Pittsburgh Pirates at Forbes Field. Gillespie and John Miller are the only two players in major league history to do both. Gillespie subsequently played in three out of seven games of the 1945 World Series, and went 0-for-6.

His career totals for 89 games include a .283 batting average (58-for-205), six home runs, 31 RBI, 17 runs scored, a .358 on-base percentage, and a .405 slugging percentage. In 56 appearances as a catcher his fielding percentage was .978, which was exactly the league's average during the time he played.

Gillespie died at the age of 49 in Anniston, Alabama.

== See also ==
- List of Major League Baseball players with a home run in their first major league at bat
- List of Major League Baseball players with a home run in their final major league at bat
