= Dave Magadan =

American baseball player and coach (born 1962)

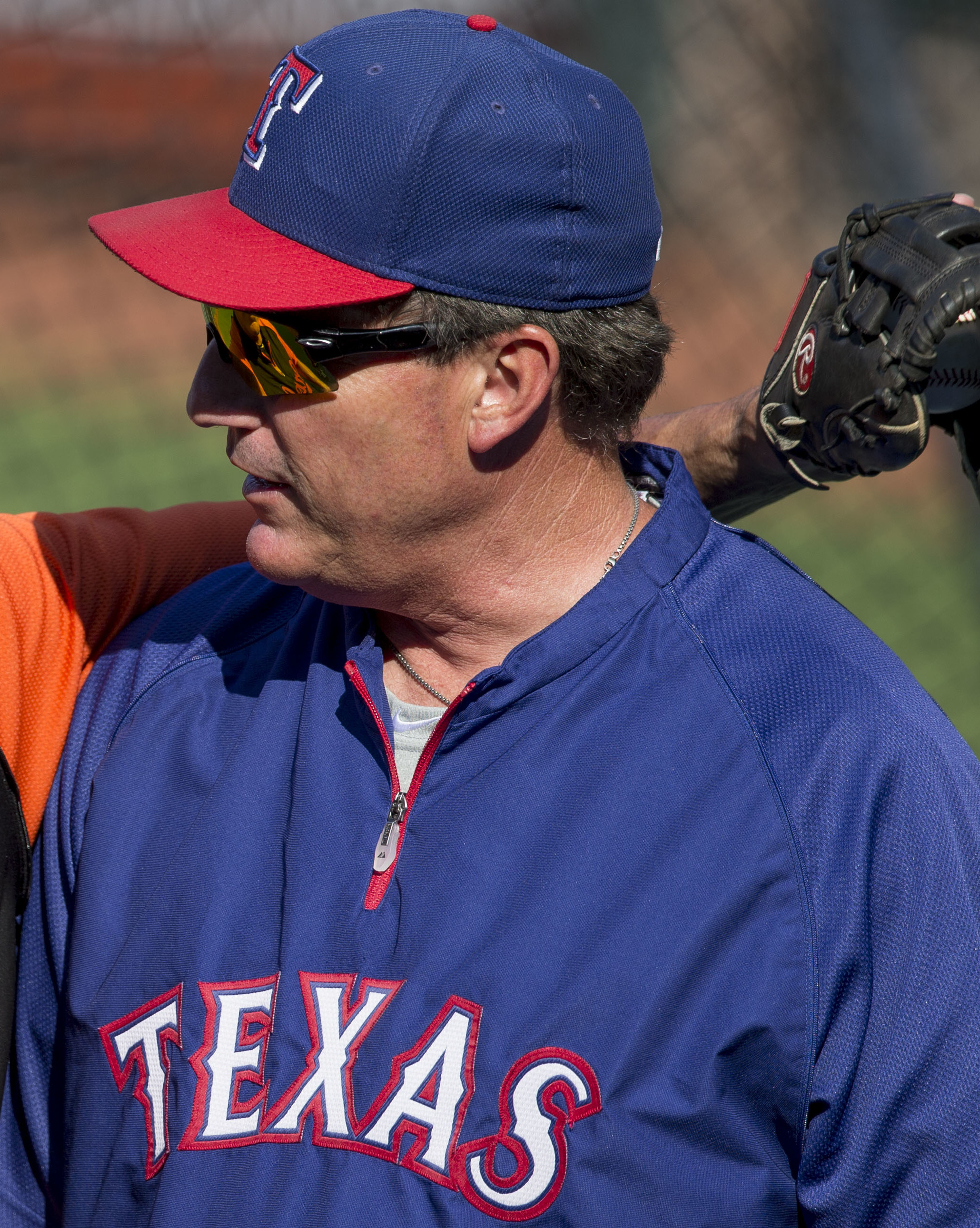
- Magadan with the Texas Rangers in 2014
- Third baseman / First baseman
- Born: September 30, 1962 (age 64); Tampa, Florida, U.S.
- Batted: Left Threw: Right

MLB debut
- September 7, 1986, for the New York Mets

Last MLB appearance
- September 26, 2001, for the San Diego Padres

MLB statistics
- Batting average: .288
- Home runs: 42
- Runs batted in: 495
- Stats at Baseball Reference

Teams
- As player: New York Mets (1986–1992); Florida Marlins (1993); Seattle Mariners (1993); Florida Marlins (1994); Houston Astros (1995); Chicago Cubs (1996); Oakland Athletics (1997–1998); San Diego Padres (1999–2001); As coach: San Diego Padres (2003–2006); Boston Red Sox (2007–2012); Texas Rangers (2013–2015); Arizona Diamondbacks (2016–2018); Colorado Rockies (2019–2022)

Career highlights and awards
- World Series champion (2007); Golden Spikes Award (1983)

David Joseph Magadan (born September 30, 1962) is an American former professional baseball player and coach. He retired as an MLB player after a 16-year career as an above average hitting first and third baseman. He is the cousin and godson of former manager Lou Piniella; Piniella was Magadan's manager during his stint with the Seattle Mariners in 1993.

== Early years ==
Magadan was listed at 6 ft 4 in (1.93 m), 245 lb (111 kg), batted from the left side, and threw from the right. While a 17-year-old senior at Jesuit High School of Tampa, Magadan was selected by the Boston Red Sox in the twelfth round of the 1980 Major League Baseball draft, but elected not to sign. His status as a prospect improved after he led West Tampa Memorial Post No. 248 to a win against a team from Richmond, Virginia, in the American Legion World Series and was named series Most Valuable Player. He also received the George W. Rulon American Legion Baseball Player of the Year award.

After high school, Magadan attended the University of Alabama in Tuscaloosa, where, in 1983, his .525 batting average led the entire National Collegiate Athletic Association (NCAA), while setting a Southeastern Conference (SEC) record, and is still the fifth best in NCAA history.

At the College World Series in 1983, Alabama defeated Michigan and Arizona State twice, but lost to Texas twice. Magadan was named the All-Tournament Team's first baseman, and also was selected as an AP All-American, was named the starting designated hitter on The Sporting News's college All-America team, received College Player of the Year honors from Baseball America and won USA Baseball's Golden Spikes Award as the best amateur baseball player. His .439 career batting average is the SEC record and tenth best in NCAA history. Magadan was selected to the College Baseball Hall of Fame in 2010.

== Minor leagues ==
Following his breakthrough season at Alabama, Magadan was selected by the New York Mets with the 32nd overall pick of the 1983 Major League Baseball draft, early in the second round. He was assigned to the South Atlantic League's Columbia Mets, with whom he batted .336 with three home runs.

Magadan did not hit any home runs his next two seasons, and did not display power as a prospect, but consistently hit for a high batting average and displayed excellent plate discipline, with a low strikeout rate and twice as many walks as strikeouts. He advanced steadily through the system, and was a September call-up for the 1986 championship squad.

== Major league career ==
=== New York Mets ===
Magadan made his major league debut on September 7, 1986, pinch hitting for Kevin Elster, and hit a double in his first MLB at-bat. He won the hearts of Mets fans in his first major league start on September 17, by hitting three singles, and reaching on an error in his four at-bats, and collecting two RBIs in the Mets' National League Eastern division clincher. For the season, Magadan went eight for eighteen for a .444 batting average. Although he arrived too late in the 1986 season to join their postseason roster for their World Series championship run, he was given a World Series ring in 1995 for this, nine years after the series.

Blocked at third base by Howard Johnson and at first by Keith Hernandez, Magadan still found his way into the lineup on a semi-regular basis in 1987 and 1988. He hit his first major league home run April 20, 1987. He provided a quality bat in late-inning situations and a capable spot starter whenever a regular needed a day off. Manager Davey Johnson even went so far as to move Johnson to shortstop for 30 games a year, just to get Magadan more playing time. Magadan became the Mets' regular first baseman in 1989 when injuries limited Hernandez to 75 games and a .233 batting average. Contrary to early reports of a mediocre glove, Magadan proved himself to be adequate at first, though certainly not in Hernandez' class.

Hernandez's contract expired after the season, and the Mets opted not to offer him a contract for the 1990 season. However, instead of giving the starting job to Magadan, the Mets traded Juan Samuel to the Los Angeles Dodgers and received Mike Marshall in return, with the intent of starting him at first. Marshall batted only .239 for the Mets, and had lost his starting job to Magadan by the time he was dealt to the Boston Red Sox on July 27. Magadan batted .328, which ranked third in the league, and his .417 on-base percentage was good for second place. He also ranked eighth in walks and fifth in sacrifice flies, and even drew four points in MVP voting.

Magadan entered the 1991 season as the starting first baseman for the Mets, but his numbers went down significantly. He only managed to bat .258 for the season, with 108 hits, and missed most of the last two months of the season with shoulder injuries. The Mets once again went outside the organization to bring in a first baseman in the off season and brought in Eddie Murray, another former Dodger and eventual Hall of Famer, to fill the role. This time, Magadan stayed in the lineup as he was moved to third base permanently while Howard Johnson was moved to the outfield. He was limited again by injuries to 99 games but managed a .283 average.

=== Florida Marlins, Seattle Mariners, and back ===
Magadan signed a two-year contract with the expansion Florida Marlins on December 8, 1992, and was in the starting line-up for their inaugural season opener, going 1-for-4 in the Marlins' 6-3 victory over the Dodgers on April 5, 1993. In late June, he was traded to the Seattle Mariners for Henry Cotto and Jeff Darwin. For the season Magadan's average was .273, as he recorded the most hits he'd had since his breakout 1990 season with 124. He also stayed relatively healthy when compared to the previous two seasons, playing in 137 games. He also became part of a historic moment on September 22, as the Mariners played host to the Texas Rangers inside the Kingdome. In the first inning, with the Mariners leading 5-0, he stepped in against Nolan Ryan. While Magadan was batting, Ryan suffered a torn ligament in his pitching elbow and had to be removed from the game; as Ryan had already announced he would be retiring following the season, Magadan proved to be the last MLB batter that Ryan faced.

After the season, the Mariners traded Magadan back to Florida in exchange for Jeff Darwin, one of the players they traded to acquire him. He played in only 74 games for the Marlins in 1994 and became a free agent after the season.

=== Houston Astros ===
Taking a pay cut, Magadan agreed to terms with the Houston Astros on a one-year deal for 1995. Magadan found himself once again with a starting job in Houston, batting .313 as their regular third baseman. Still, the Astros chose not to re-sign Magadan at the end of the 1995 season, choosing instead to acquire Sean Berry from the Montreal Expos to play third.

=== Chicago Cubs ===
Magadan signed with the Chicago Cubs in 1996. Injuries and a gold glove first baseman (Mark Grace) limited him to pinch hitting duties, and he batted only .254, and was used sparingly by manager Jim Riggleman.

=== Oakland A's ===
On January 24, 1997, Magadan signed a one-year deal with the Oakland Athletics. He made 328 plate appearances during the 1997 season, splitting his time fairly evenly between first, third, and designated hitter. He batted .303 with four home runs, and later re-signed with the A's on November 12, 1997. While Magadan received far less playing time in 1998, he still emerged with a .321 batting average.

=== San Diego Padres ===
Magadan signed with the San Diego Padres in 1999 to back up first and third base, and subsequently re-signed with the team for the 2000 and 2001 seasons. He made his first career appearance as a shortstop for the Padres in 2000, and in 2001, he made his only appearance at second base.

Seasons	Games	AB	PA	Runs	Hits	2B	3B	HR	RBI	SB	BB	SO	HBP	Avg.	Slg.	OBP	Fld%
16	1582	4159	4963	516	1197	218	13	42	495	11	718	546	12	.288	.377	.390	.983

Magadan had a career .994 fielding percentage at first base and .951 at third base.

== Coaching career ==
After his retirement as a player, Magadan was hired by the Padres as their minor league hitting instructor in 2002, and was hired as the team's hitting coach in 2003. On June 15, 2006, with the Padres batting .252 as a team (last in the National League), Magadan was fired by Padres GM Kevin Towers and replaced by former Padres hitting coach Merv Rettenmund. Their .322 in on-base percentage and .391 slugging percentage was second to last to the Chicago Cubs.

On October 20, 2006, Magadan was named hitting coach for the Boston Red Sox. In his first season on the job, Magadan's Red Sox would go on to see great improvements in batting average (.269 to .279), slugging percentage (.435 to .444) and on-base percentage (.351 to .362), and led the American League with 689 walks. In 2007, Boston would finally end their archrival New York Yankees' nine-year run as American League Eastern division champions, and went on to sweep the Colorado Rockies in the 2007 World Series. The team batted .333 in the World Series.

The Red Sox were among the league leaders in all batting categories again in 2008, leading the major leagues with a .358 on-base percentage and 646 walks, and ranking second in the American League in batting average (.280), runs (845), doubles (353), RBIs (807) and total bases (2,503), and finishing third in slugging percentage (.447).

Magadan was suspended for one game on June 26, 2009, for arguing balls and strikes with home plate umpire Bob Davidson on June 24. While still making the post season as a wild card, the Red Sox saw a substantial dip in all categories in 2009, and were eliminated in the first round of the playoffs against the Los Angeles Angels.

On October 19, 2012, Magadan was named hitting coach for the Texas Rangers. He left the team after the 2015 season.

On November 25, 2015, Magadan was hired as the hitting coach for the Arizona Diamondbacks. On October 1, 2018, the Diamondbacks mutually agreed to part ways with Magadan. Arizona was one of the worst-hitting teams in all of baseball with a .235 batting average for the 2018 season.

During the 2018 winter meetings in Las Vegas, Magadan was hired to be the hitting coach for the Colorado Rockies. On October 13, 2022, it was announced Magadan would not return for the 2023 season.

Preceded by Ron Jackson	Boston Red Sox hitting coach 2007–2012	Succeeded by Greg Colbrunn
Preceded by Scott Coolbaugh	Texas Rangers hitting coach 2013–2015	Succeeded by Anthony Iapoce
Preceded by Turner Ward	Arizona Diamondbacks hitting coach 2016–2018	Succeeded by Darnell Coles
