= John Miller (first baseman) =

American baseball player (1944–2023)

- First baseman/Outfielder
- Born: March 14, 1944; Alhambra, California, United States
- Died: April 23, 2023 (aged 79); Laguna Beach, California, United States
- Batted: Right Threw: Right

Professional debut
- MLB: September 11, 1966, for the New York Yankees
- NPB: April 12, 1970, for the Chunichi Dragons

Last appearance
- MLB: September 27, 1969, for the Los Angeles Dodgers
- NPB: October 5, 1972, for the Chunichi Dragons

MLB statistics
- Batting average: .164
- Home runs: 2
- Runs batted in: 4

NPB statistics
- Batting average: .245
- Home runs: 79
- Runs batted in: 222
- Stats at Baseball Reference

Teams
- New York Yankees (1966); Los Angeles Dodgers (1969); Chunichi Dragons (1970–1972)

John Allen Miller (March 14, 1944 – April 23, 2023) was a Major League Baseball player who played with the 1966 New York Yankees and 1969 Los Angeles Dodgers.

He is one of only two players to hit a home run in his first and last major league at-bats. The other is Paul Gillespie. Miller's first and last major league at-bat home runs (off Lee Stange and Jim Merritt respectively) were the only two home runs he hit in his MLB career.

Following his major league career, Miller played for three seasons in Japan, from 1970 until 1972 for the Chunichi Dragons. There, he primarily played first base, batting .245 with 79 home runs over those three seasons.

Miller died on April 23, 2023.

== See also ==
- List of Major League Baseball players with a home run in their first major league at bat
- List of Major League Baseball players with a home run in their final major league at bat
