= Steve Dillard (baseball) =

American baseball player (born 1951)

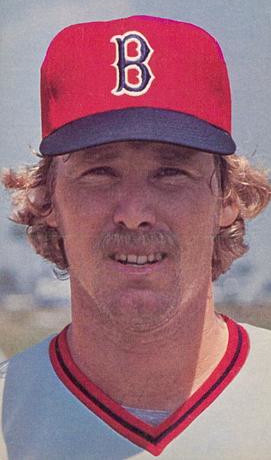
- Dillard with the Boston Red Sox in 1976
- Second baseman
- Born: February 8, 1951 (age 75); Memphis, Tennessee, U.S.
- Batted: Right Threw: Right

MLB debut
- September 28, 1975, for the Boston Red Sox

Last MLB appearance
- October 3, 1982, for the Chicago White Sox

MLB statistics
- Batting average: .243
- Home runs: 13
- Runs batted in: 102
- Stats at Baseball Reference

Teams
- Boston Red Sox (1975–1977); Detroit Tigers (1978); Chicago Cubs (1979–1981); Chicago White Sox (1982)

Stephen Bradley Dillard (born February 8, 1951) is an American former professional baseball player and manager. He played eight seasons in Major League Baseball (MLB) for the Boston Red Sox, Detroit Tigers, Chicago Cubs, and Chicago White Sox. Dillard, a reserve infielder, played mainly as a second baseman.

== Early life ==
Born in Memphis, Tennessee, Steve Dillard was raised in Saltillo, Mississippi. He played shortstop for Saltillo High School. Dillard was drafted by the San Diego Padres in the 13th round of the 1970 Major League Baseball draft, but did not sign as he had been awarded a full scholarship to the University of Mississippi. After two years of college, he was drafted by the Boston Red Sox in the second round of the 1972 MLB draft.

== Playing career ==
=== Boston Red Sox (1972–1977) ===
Dillard began his professional career in 1972 playing for the Winston-Salem Red Sox of the Class A Carolina League, with whom he played the entirety of the 1973 season. After recovering from offseason shoulder surgery, Dillard was assigned to the Double-A Bristol Red Sox of the Eastern League for 1974. After approximately one month, he was promoted to the Triple-A Pawtucket Red Sox in the International League.

Though having started the 1975 season at Triple-A, more shoulder problems in the first half resulted in a rehab assignment at Double-A. Dillard was called up to the Boston Red Sox in the final week of the season. He made his major league debut on September 28, scoring two runs on two hits and stealing a base.

He began the 1976 campaign with Boston, but was sent down to the Triple-A Rhode Island Red Sox for two months in an attempt to convert him to second, where as he had primarily played as a shortstop up until this time. While in Boston, Dillard became a valuable backup for second baseman Denny Doyle, and eventually for shortstop Rick Burleson and third baseman Butch Hobson. Dillard played the entire 1977 season with Boston, but saw little playing time. Across three seasons with the Red Sox, he appeared in 124 games, including 63 at second base, 21 at shortstop, 18 at third base, and 13 as a designated hitter.

=== Detroit Tigers (1978) ===
After the Red Sox acquired second baseman Jerry Remy from the California Angels, Dillard was sent to the Detroit Tigers in exchange for two minor leaguers and cash considerations on January 30, 1978. He provided solid support for young infielders Lou Whitaker (second base) and Alan Trammell (shortstop) for a full year. He appeared in 54 games, including 41 at second base, for the Tigers in 1978.

=== Chicago Cubs (1979–1981) ===
During 1979's spring training, he was traded to the Chicago Cubs for a player to be named later (Ed Putman). His most productive season came in his first year at Chicago, when he hit a career-high .283 batting average with five home runs and 31 runs in 89 games played. The following season, he posted career-numbers in games (100), hits (55), and RBI (27). He played three seasons with the Cubs, appearing in 242 games, including 130 at second and 67 at third.

=== Chicago White Sox (1982) ===
Dillard was released by the Cubs after the 1981 season, and he later signed as a free agent with the Chicago White Sox for 1982. He played the majority of the season with the Triple-A Edmonton Trappers of the Pacific Coast League, but was called up for 16 games, all at second base, near the season's end. He was released after the season.

In an eight-season career, Dillard was a .243 hitter (246-for-1013) with 13 home runs and 102 RBI in 438 games, including 148 runs, 50 doubles, 6 triples, and 15 stolen bases.

== Managerial career ==
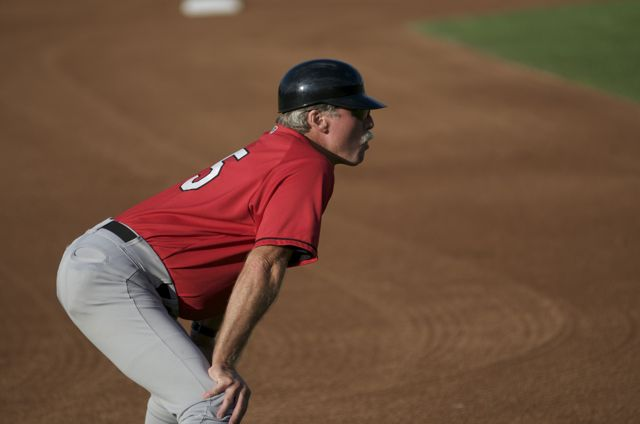
Dillard managing the Quad Cities River Bandits in 2008

Following his playing retirement, Dillard started a managing career in the Chicago White Sox minor league system. In 1983 and 1984, he managed their rookie Gulf Coast League White Sox. He was reassigned to the Double-A Glens Falls White Sox of the Eastern League for 1985, but returned to the GCL White Sox in 1986 and 1987. He managed the Class A South Bend White Sox in the Midwest League in 1988.

From 1989 to 1990, Dillard worked for the Houston Astros as their Minor League Infield Instructor. He continued in the Astros organization as manager of the Class A Short Season Auburn Astros of the New York–Penn League (1991–1992) and Quad Cities River Bandits of the Midwest League (1993–1994). In 1995, he was the hitting coach for the Chicago Cubs' Class A Rockford Cubbies in the Midwest League.

After taking time off to see his children play baseball in high school, he returned to baseball in 2000 as skipper of the Jackson DiamondKats of the independent Texas-Louisiana League. In 2006, he joined the St. Louis Cardinals organization. He served as hitting coach for the Quad Cities Swing/River Bandits from 2006 to 2007, but was moved up to coach hitters with their Class A-Advanced Palm Beach Cardinals in the Florida State League during the 2007 season. He returned to Quad Cities as their manager in 2008 and 2009.

== Personal life ==
His son, Tim Dillard, a right-handed sidearm pitcher, has appeared in Major League Baseball for the Milwaukee Brewers.
