= Chris Jelic =

American baseball player (born 1963)

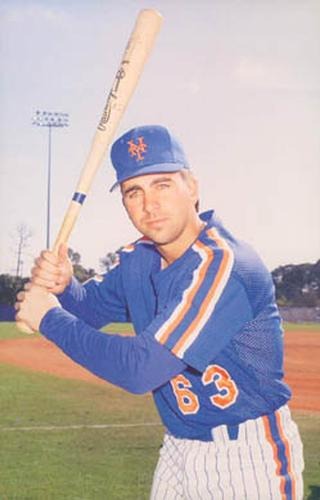
- Left fielder
- Born: December 16, 1963 (age 62); Bethlehem, Pennsylvania, U.S.
- Batted: Right Threw: Right

MLB debut
- September 30, 1990, for the New York Mets

Last MLB appearance
- October 3, 1990, for the New York Mets

MLB statistics
- Batting average: .091
- Home runs: 1
- Runs batted in: 1
- Stats at Baseball Reference

Teams
- New York Mets (1990)

Christopher John Jelic (born December 16, 1963), is an American former professional baseball outfielder who appeared in four Major League Baseball (MLB) games with the 1990 New York Mets.

== Biography ==
Jelic attended the University of Pittsburgh, where he played on both the Panthers baseball team and the Panthers football team. In 1984, he played collegiate summer baseball with the Hyannis Mets of the Cape Cod Baseball League. He was selected by the Kansas City Royals in the second round of the 1985 MLB draft.

Jelic played professionally from 1985 through 1993, primarily in Minor League Baseball for farm teams of the Royals, New York Mets, and San Diego Padres. He was traded to the Mets with David Cone on March 27, 1987, for Rick Anderson, Mauro Gozzo and Ed Hearn.

Jelic played in four major-league games, all for the Mets and all during the 1990 season. He had a batting average of .091, collecting one hit in 11 at bats. That hit was a home run in the final at-bat of his final major-league game. Jelic was released by the Mets in November 1990. He subsequently played in the Padres organization.

After his playing career concluded, Jelic completed his degree at Pittsburgh and began a career in sales.

== See also ==
- List of Major League Baseball players with a home run in their final major league at bat
