= Terry McDaniel (baseball) =

American baseball player

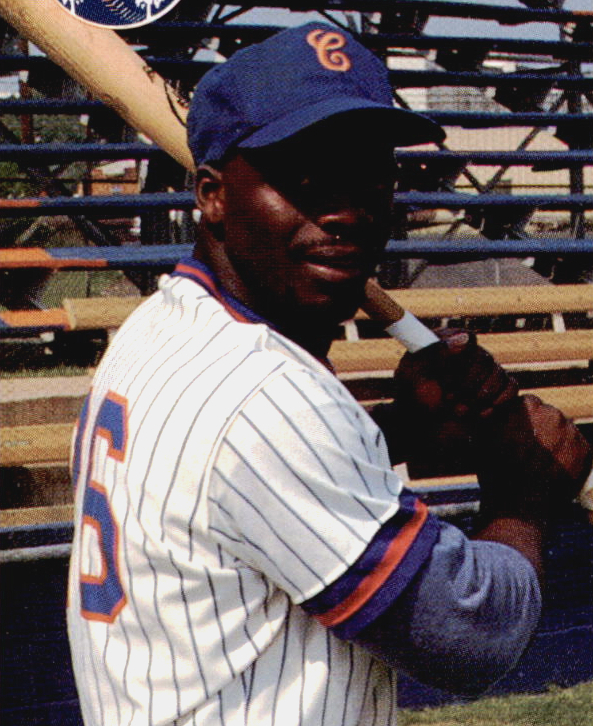
- McDaniel with the Columbia Mets c. 1988
- Outfielder
- Born: December 6, 1966 (age 59); Kansas City, Missouri, U.S.
- Batted: Right Threw: Right

MLB debut
- August 31, 1991, for the New York Mets

Last MLB appearance
- October 4, 1991, for the New York Mets

MLB statistics
- Batting average: .207
- Runs: 3
- Hits: 6
- Stats at Baseball Reference

Teams
- New York Mets (1991)

Terrence Keith McDaniel (born December 6, 1966) is an American former Major League Baseball outfielder.

McDaniel graduated from Southeast High School in Kansas City, Missouri in 1985 and attended Houston on a college football scholarship but dropped out after one year to pursue a professional baseball career.

He played during one season at the major league level for the New York Mets. He was drafted by the Mets in the 6th round of the 1986 amateur draft. McDaniel played his first professional season with their Rookie league Kingsport Mets in 1986, and his split his last season with the Cincinnati Reds' Double-A Chattanooga Lookouts and Triple-A Nashville Sounds in 1992.
