= Doug Simons =

American baseball player (born 1966)

- Pitcher
- Born: September 15, 1966 (age 59); Bakersfield, California, U.S.
- Batted: Left Threw: Left

MLB debut
- April 9, 1991, for the New York Mets

Last MLB appearance
- September 24, 1992, for the Montreal Expos

MLB statistics
- Win–loss record: 2–3
- Earned run average: 6.68
- Strikeouts: 44
- Stats at Baseball Reference

Teams
- New York Mets (1991); Montreal Expos (1992)

Douglas Eugene Simons (born September 15, 1966) is an American former professional baseball pitcher. He played in Major League Baseball (MLB) for the New York Mets (1991) and Montreal Expos (1992).

== Early life and draft ==
Prior to playing professionally, Simons attended Calabasas High School in Calabasas, California and then Oxnard College and Pepperdine University.

He was drafted by major league teams twice. In 1987, he was selected by the Los Angeles Dodgers in the 45th round of the draft, but did not sign. He was next drafted by the Minnesota Twins in the ninth round of the 1988 amateur draft and did sign.

In the 1990 Rule 5 draft, he was selected by the Mets from the Twins.

== Major league career ==
Simons made his major league debut on April 9, 1991 at the age of 24. Pitching for the Mets, he made 42 appearances in his rookie season and went 2–3 with a 5.19 ERA. In 60 2/3 innings, he allowed 55 hits and 19 walks, while striking out 38 batters.

On April 2, 1992, he was traded to the Expos for minor league player Rob Katzaroff. He appeared in seven games for the Expos in 1992 and went 0–0 with a 23.63 ERA. In 5 1/3 innings, he allowed 15 hits and two walks. He struck out six batters. He played his final major league game on September 24, 1992.

Overall, Simons went 2–3 with a 6.68 ERA in 49 big league appearances. In 66 innings, he allowed 70 hits and 21 walks, while striking out 44 batters.

== Minor league career ==
Simons pitched in the minor leagues from 1988 to 1990 and from 1992 to 1997. He played in the Twins (1988–1990), Expos (1992–1993), Kansas City Royals (1994) and Houston Astros (1996) systems, and in 1995 he pitched for the Mobile Baysharks of the independent Texas–Louisiana League.

Overall, he went 72–54 with a 3.46 ERA in 193 games (148 starts). He showed flashes of excellence at times – for example, he went 13–5 with a 2.63 ERA for the Visalia Oaks and Orlando Twins in 1989 and in 1990, he went 15–12 with a 2.54 ERA for Orlando. In 1995, he went 4–2 with a 2.94 ERA for the Mobile Baysharks.

== International career ==
Simons pitched for the Rimini Pirates in the Italian Serie A1 in 1997.

He also played winter ball with the Leones del Caracas club of the Venezuelan League during the 1993–1994 season.

== Post-playing career ==
Simons served as the pitching coach for the Pittsfield Mets in 1998 and 1999, the Capital City Bombers in 2000 and 2001. He later scouted for the Texas Rangers from 2002–2005. In August 2005 he became the head coach of the Covenant College baseball team.
