= Kevin Baez =

American baseball player and manager (born 1967)

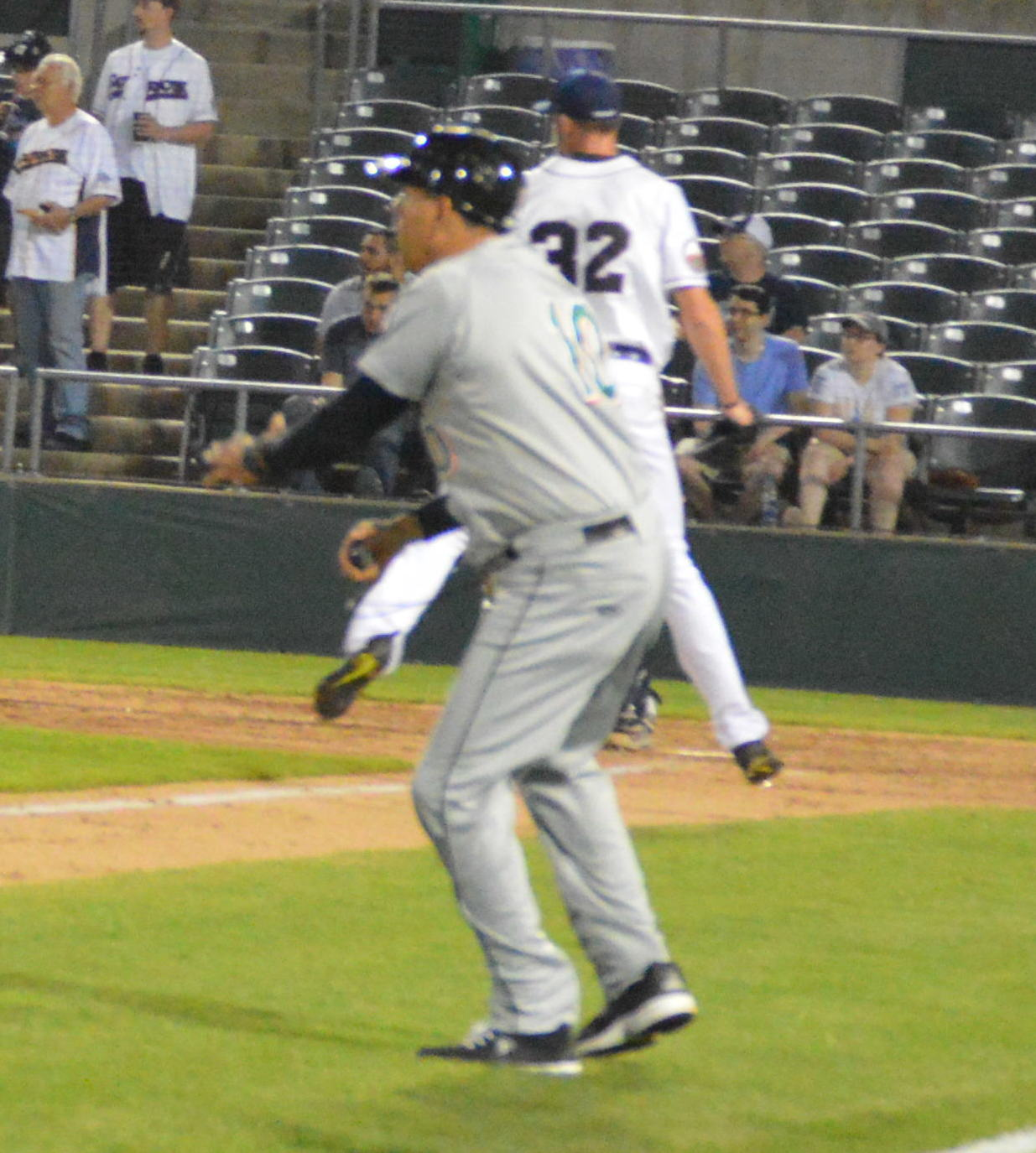
- Baez with the Long Island Ducks in 2018
- Shortstop
- Born: January 10, 1967 (age 59); Brooklyn, New York, U.S.
- Batted: Right Threw: Right

MLB debut
- September 3, 1990, for the New York Mets

Last MLB appearance
- October 3, 1993, for the New York Mets

MLB statistics
- Batting average: .179
- Home runs: 0
- Runs batted in: 7
- Stats at Baseball Reference

Teams
- New York Mets (1990, 1992–1993)

Kevin Richard Baez (born January 10, 1967) is an American former Major League Baseball player. He was a shortstop for the New York Mets in 1990, 1992 and 1993. Baez attended college at Dominican College and was drafted by the New York Mets in the 7th round in 1988. He made his debut on September 3, 1990. In 63 career games, he was 27 for 126 (a .179 average). He had 7 career RBIs. Baez played in his final game on October 3, 1993.

Baez has also served as the manager and third base coach of the Long Island Ducks.

In 2007 Baez spent most of the season coaching in the Mets organization.

Third base/infield coach Baez returned to the Ducks after serving as a coach in 2009. The former Ducks and big league infielder became a full-time coach with Long Island on May 20, 2005, and spent most of the 2007 season coaching in the Mets organization. In his role with the Ducks, he is responsible for working with all players to make sure the level of play is where it is needed both offensively and defensively to support the pitching staff. Baez will also coach third base

Baez ran baseball clinics for all ages in Bay Shore, NY at Pro Game Athletics. He helps children of all ages with the fundamentals of baseball from fielding to hitting.

Baez was an anchor of the Ducks' 2004 championship team, batting .256 with 36 runs scored and 40 RBI in 98 games played. He was selected to the Atlantic League All-Star team and took home MVP honors after going 2-for-4 with two RBI and scored the go-ahead run in the North's 10–8 victory over the South at Camden's Campbell's Field. In the 2004 playoffs, Baez batted .263 en route to his first professional baseball championship.

On November 17, 2010, the Long Island Ducks named Baez their manager for the 2011 season, replacing Dave LaPoint. Baez managed the team through the 2018 season, winning two consecutive championships in the 2012 and 2013 seasons.

On November 27, 2018, the Ducks announced that Baez was stepping down in order to manage the Rockland Boulders of the Can-Am League for the 2019 season.

A veteran of 63 major league and 1,750 minor league games, Baez registered career-highs in hits (113) and doubles (27) in 2000 with the Norfolk Tides (AAA, Mets). He has made three different stops in the majors (all with the Mets). His most lengthy stay came in 1993 when he appeared in 52 games at shortstop for New York.
