= Jackson DiamondKats =

- 2000–2000; Jackson, Mississippi

Minor league affiliations
- Previous classes: Independent (2000)
- League: Texas-Louisiana League (2000)

Team data
- Previous names: Jackson DiamondKats (2000)

The Jackson DiamondKats played one year in the independent Texas-Louisiana League, struggling to a last place finish in 2000 (38-74) and finishing 6th of 8 teams in attendance (37,066). Managed by Steve Dillard, they had no All-Stars. Ryan Creek (5-5, 3.07) was third in the league in ERA. The biggest name was former major leaguer Mark Carreon (.340, .527 SLG in 150 AB).
