= Orlando Mercado =

Puerto Rican baseball player (born 1961)

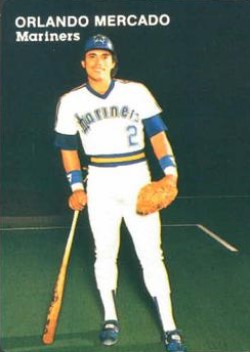
- Catcher
- Born: November 7, 1961 (age 64); Arecibo, Puerto Rico
- Batted: Right Threw: Right

MLB debut
- September 13, 1982, for the Seattle Mariners

Last MLB appearance
- September 30, 1990, for the Montreal Expos

MLB statistics
- Batting average: .199
- Home runs: 7
- Runs batted in: 45
- Stats at Baseball Reference

Teams
- Seattle Mariners (1982–1984); Texas Rangers (1986); Detroit Tigers (1987); Los Angeles Dodgers (1987); Oakland Athletics (1988); Minnesota Twins (1989); New York Mets (1990); Montreal Expos (1990)

Orlando Mercado Rodríguez (born November 7, 1961) is a Puerto Rican former professional baseball player and coach. He played all or parts of eight seasons in Major League Baseball (MLB) with the Seattle Mariners, Texas Rangers, Detroit Tigers, Los Angeles Dodgers, Oakland Athletics, Minnesota Twins, New York Mets, and Montreal Expos. From 2003 to 2010, he was the bullpen coach for the Los Angeles Angels of Anaheim.

Mercado signed with the Mariners in 1978, at the age of 16. He made his first MLB start on September 19, 1982, becoming the first player in modern major league history to hit a grand slam for his first hit. He was the Mariners' starting catcher to begin 1983, but was demoted to Triple-A in July, later returning as a September call-up. He split 1984 between the majors and minors, with his season ending in early September after suffering a hairline fracture in his left arm after being hit by a Danny Darwin pitch. Seattle traded Mercado to Texas for catcher Donnie Scott in April 1985.

Mercado became a local star for the Portland Beavers Triple-A franchise in 1989. He was inducted into the Hispanic Heritage Baseball Museum Hall of Fame on May 22, 2004 in a pregame on-field ceremony at Angel Stadium in Anaheim, California.

After his playing career, Mercado began coaching in the Los Angeles Angels organization. He was the major league team's bullpen catcher from 2000 to 2002, then bullpen coach from 2003 to 2010. He was a roving catching coordinator in 2011. He was the hitting coach of the Trenton Thunder, the Double-A affiliate of the New York Yankees, in 2014.

== Personal life ==
Mercado's son was selected by the Arizona Diamondbacks in the 2003 MLB draft.

Sporting positions
Preceded by Bobby Ramos	Anaheim Angels/Los Angeles Angels of Anaheim Bullpen Coach; 2003–2010	Succeeded by Steve Soliz
