= Mark Carreon =

American baseball player (born 1963)

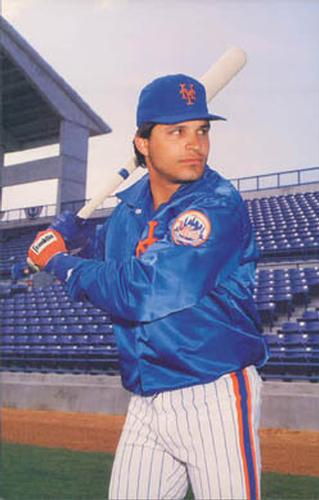
- First baseman / Outfielder
- Born: July 19, 1963 (age 63); Chicago, Illinois, U.S.
- Batted: Right Threw: Left

Professional debut
- MLB: September 8, 1987, for the New York Mets
- NPB: April 5, 1997, for the Chiba Lotte Marines

Last appearance
- MLB: August 23, 1996, for the Cleveland Indians
- NPB: July 15, 1998, for the Chiba Lotte Marines

MLB statistics
- Batting average: .277
- Home runs: 69
- Runs batted in: 289

NPB statistics
- Batting average: .285
- Home runs: 22
- Runs batted in: 114
- Stats at Baseball Reference

Teams
- New York Mets (1987–1991); Detroit Tigers (1992); San Francisco Giants (1993–1996); Cleveland Indians (1996); Chiba Lotte Marines (1997–1998)

Mark Steven Carreon (born July 19, 1963) is an American former first baseman and outfielder in Major League Baseball. He was selected by the New York Mets in the 8th round of the 1981 draft out of Salpointe Catholic High School.

== Career ==
He made his major league debut on September 8, 1987. From 1987 through 1996, he played for the New York Mets (1987–1991), Detroit Tigers (1992), San Francisco Giants (1993–1996) and Cleveland Indians (1996). He also played two seasons in Japan for the Chiba Lotte Marines in 1997 and 1998. Mark is the son of former major league catcher Cam Carreon.

In a 10-season career, Carreon was a .277 hitter (557-for-2012) with 69 home runs and 289 runs batted in (RBI) in 738 games played. Defensively, he recorded a .987 fielding percentage playing at all three outfield positions and first base. Carreon was a rarity, in that he threw left-handed but batted right-handed, as a non-pitcher.

Carreon has the most pinch-hit home runs for the New York Mets with eight. As a member of the Giants, he won the 1995 Willie Mac Award honoring his spirit. He was traded from the Giants to the Indians for Jim Poole and cash on July 9, 1996. He was batting .260 with 22 doubles, three triples, nine homers and 51 RBI at the time of the transaction. The Indians addressed a need for an additional first baseman, a position of which the Giants had a surplus.

Carreon finished his career with the Jackson DiamondKats of the Texas–Louisiana League.

Carreon spent two years playing pro ball in Japan for the Chiba Lotte Marines, after the 1996 season.

Late in 1999, Carreon was reported as missing by his mother, but was later found safe.

On December 13, 2007, Carreon was named in the Mitchell Report. Kirk Radomski alleged that he sold Dianabol pills to Carreon while Carreon played for the Giants.

== See also ==
- List of second-generation Major League Baseball players
- List of Major League Baseball players named in the Mitchell Report
