= Kelvin Torve =

American baseball player (born 1960)

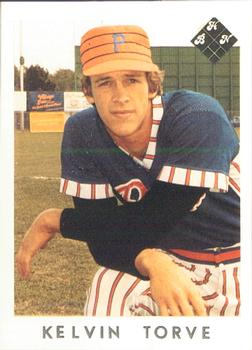
- First baseman
- Born: January 10, 1960 (age 66); Rapid City, South Dakota, U.S.
- Batted: Left Threw: Right

MLB debut
- June 25, 1988, for the Minnesota Twins

Last MLB appearance
- July 24, 1991, for the New York Mets

MLB statistics
- Batting average: .226
- Home runs: 1
- Runs batted in: 4

NPB statistics
- Batting average: .271
- Home runs: 20
- Runs batted in: 93
- Stats at Baseball Reference

Teams
- Minnesota Twins (1988); New York Mets (1990–1991); Orix BlueWave (1992–1993)

Kelvin Curtis Torve (born January 10, 1960) is an American former Major League Baseball and Nippon Professional Baseball First baseman, and current head coach of the American Legion Baseball Post 22 Hardhats in Rapid City, South Dakota. Torve batted left and threw right.

== Minor leagues ==
Torve was drafted by the San Francisco Giants in the second round of the 1981 Major League Baseball draft. Over four seasons in the Giants' farm system, Torve batted .284 with 36 home runs and 227 runs batted in. On April 9, 1985 he was traded to the Baltimore Orioles for minor league pitcher Tommy Alexander. He batted .262 with 28 home runs and 150 RBIs over three seasons in the Orioles' farm system.

== Minnesota Twins ==
After the 1987 season, Torve signed as a Free agent with the Minnesota Twins. He spent most of the 1988 season in triple A with the Portland Beavers, but came up to Minnesota in late June. He hit the only major league home run of his career on June 27 off the California Angels' Stew Cliburn. His only other RBI came on July 5 to blow a save for Hall of Fame closer Lee Smith. He went 3-for-16 in his one month stint with the Twins before returning to triple A in late July. He spent the entire 1989 season in Portland, where he batted .291 with eight home runs and 62 RBIs.

== New York Mets ==
Torve signed with the New York Mets for the 1990 season. He made his Mets debut on August 7, and in his first Mets plate appearance, he was hit by a José DeJesús pitch. More importantly, he made his Mets debut wearing number 24. Torve was the first Mets player to wear number 24 since the legendary Willie Mays played for the Mets in 1973. Then-team owner Joan Payson had promised Mays that the Mets would not reissue number 24, so that it would not be worn again by a player on a New York National League team in recognition of his years with the New York Giants. The number remained unofficially retired after Payson died and the team was sold by her family to Doubleday and Company and to Fred Wilpon, chairman of the board of Sterling Equities.

Equipment manager Charlie Samuels realized his mistake after receiving complaints from fans, and reissued Torve number 39 during the California road trip that began August 17. Torve kept the number for the remainder of the Mets' home stand, however, and batted .545 with two doubles and two RBIs in his short stint in Willie Mays' number. Number 39 batted .185 with no RBIs.

Torve joined the Mets again in 1991 in late June. He had eight at bats without a hit.

== Orix Blue Wave ==
In 1992, Torve signed with the Orix BlueWave, where he became teammates with eighteen year old phenom Ichiro Suzuki. His first season in Japan got off to a slow start, but he turned it around, and led the team with a .305 batting average. His eleven home runs and 58 RBIs were third on the team (behind Satoshi Takahashi & Kazuhiko Ishimine in both cases). In his second season with Orix, Torve batted .232 with nine home runs and 35 RBIs.
