= Billy Berroa =

Dominican Republic baseball announcer

- Born: Porfirio Antonio Berroa Carbucia; February 29, 1928; San Pedro de Macorís
- Died: October 17, 2007 (aged 79); Santo Domingo

Porfirio Antonio Berroa Carbucia (February 27, 1928 – October 17, 2007) was a Dominican broadcaster known for his Spanish language baseball announcing. A native of San Pedro de Macorís, Dominican Republic, Berroa was affectionately known as "Billy" and "El Internacional".

Recognized as one of the most important Spanish voices in baseball, Berroa began announcing Major League Baseball games in 1963, including the post-season games and All-Star competition from 1987 through 2004. He covered the New York Mets Spanish broadcasts between 1987 and 1993 and rejoined the team from 1997 to 2007, mainly on Radio WADO 1280 AM. He also called games for the New York Yankees and Philadelphia Phillies at different points in his career.

Berroa also covered the Caribbean Series, the Olympic Games, as well as professional boxing, and announced Winter League baseball in the Dominican Republic for 50 years, the last 23 years with the Escogido Lions club. On October 17, 1998, he was selected to the Dominican Republic's Sports Hall of Fame. He was also elected into the Hispanic Heritage Baseball Museum Hall of Fame in 2005 At Shea Stadium in New York.

Berroa died of prostate cancer in Santo Domingo, D.R., at the age of 79.

== Sources ==
- New York Mets broadcasters
- NYM/MLB obituary
- El Diario (Spanish)
