= 1983 New York Mets season =

1983 New York Mets
- League: National League
- Division: East
- Ballpark: Shea Stadium
- City: New York
- Record: 68–94 (.420)
- Divisional place: 6th
- Owners: Nelson Doubleday, Jr.
- General manager: Frank Cashen
- Managers: George Bamberger, Frank Howard
- Television: WOR-TV/SportsChannel New York (Ralph Kiner, Steve Zabriskie, Tim McCarver, Bud Harrelson)
- Radio: WHN (Bob Murphy, Steve LaMar, Juan Alicea)

The 1983 New York Mets season was the 22nd regular season for the Mets. They went 68–94 and finished in sixth place in the National League East, twenty-two games behind the first place Philadelphia Phillies. The Mets were managed by George Bamberger and Frank Howard. They played home games at Shea Stadium.

Even though they finished with 94 losses, this Mets team showed the beginnings of what would be a contender for the next decade. Darryl Strawberry made his debut and on June 15 the Mets would get Keith Hernandez from St. Louis to start putting the veteran pieces together for what would be the 1986 Championship team.

This would be the last time the Mets would finish in last place until 1993.

== Offseason ==
- December 10, 1982: Mike Scott was traded by the Mets to the Houston Astros for Danny Heep.
- December 16, 1982: Charlie Puleo, Lloyd McClendon, and Jason Felice (minors) were traded by the Mets to the Cincinnati Reds for Tom Seaver.
- January 13, 1983: The Mets traded a player to be named later to the Boston Red Sox for Mike Torrez. The Mets completed the deal by sending Mike Davis (minors) to the Red Sox on February 15.

== Regular season ==
- May 6, 1983: Darryl Strawberry made his major league debut.
- June 15, 1983: The Mets traded Neil Allen and Rick Ownbey to the Cardinals for Keith Hernandez.

=== Season standings ===
NL East
Team	W	L	Pct.	GB	Home	Road
Philadelphia Phillies	90	72	.556	—	50‍–‍31	40‍–‍41
Pittsburgh Pirates	84	78	.519	6	41‍–‍40	43‍–‍38
Montreal Expos	82	80	.506	8	46‍–‍35	36‍–‍45
St. Louis Cardinals	79	83	.488	11	44‍–‍37	35‍–‍46
Chicago Cubs	71	91	.438	19	43‍–‍38	28‍–‍53
New York Mets	68	94	.420	22	41‍–‍41	27‍–‍53

=== Record vs. opponents ===
1983 National League record Sources:
Team	ATL	CHC	CIN	HOU	LAD	MON	NYM	PHI	PIT	SD	SF	STL
Atlanta	—	5–7	12–6	11–7	7–11	7–5	8–4	7–5	6–6	9–9	9–9	7–5
Chicago	7–5	—	4–8	5–7	6–6	7–11	9–9	5–13	9–9	5–7	4–8	10–8
Cincinnati	6–12	8–4	—	5–13	7–11	4–8	7–5	6–6	6–6	9–9	10–8	6–6
Houston	7–11	7–5	13–5	—	6–12	8–4	9–3	4–8	6–6	11–7	12–6	2–10
Los Angeles	11–7	6–6	11–7	12–6	—	7–5	7–5	11–1	6–6	6–12–1	5–13	9–3
Montreal	5–7	11–7	8–4	4–8	5–7	—	8–10	8–10–1	8–10	8–4	8–4	9–9
New York	4–8	9–9	5–7	3–9	5–7	10–8	—	6–12	9–9	6–6	5–7	6–12
Philadelphia	5-7	13–5	6–6	8–4	1–11	10–8–1	12–6	—	11–7	5–7	5–7	14–4
Pittsburgh	6–6	9–9	6–6	6–6	6–6	10–8	9–9	7–11	—	9–3	6–6	10–8
San Diego	9–9	7–5	9–9	7–11	12–6–1	4–8	6–6	7–5	3–9	—	11–7	6–6
San Francisco	9–9	8–4	8–10	6–12	13–5	4–8	7–5	7–5	6–6	7–11	—	4–8
St. Louis	5–7	8–10	6–6	10–2	3–9	9–9	12–6	4–14	8–10	6–6	8–4	—

=== Opening Day starters ===
- Bob Bailor
- Hubie Brooks
- George Foster
- Brian Giles
- Ron Hodges
- Mike Howard
- Dave Kingman
- Tom Seaver
- Mookie Wilson

=== Notable transactions ===
- April 7, 1983: Clint Hurdle was signed as a free agent by the Mets.
- June 6, 1983: 1983 Major League Baseball draft
  - Stan Jefferson was drafted by the Mets in the 1st round (20th pick).
  - Matt Williams was drafted by the Mets in the 27th round, but did not sign.
- June 15, 1983: Neil Allen and Rick Ownbey were traded by the Mets to the St. Louis Cardinals for Keith Hernandez.
- July 22, 1983: Scott Dye (minors) was traded by the Mets to the Oakland Athletics for Kelvin Moore.

=== Roster ===
1983 New York Mets
Roster
Pitchers: 13 Neil Allen; 44 Ron Darling; 32 Carlos Diaz; 45 Brent Gaff; 29 Tom Gorman; 28 Scott Holman; 38 Tim Leary; 36 Ed Lynch; 47 Jesse Orosco; 20 Rick Ownbey; 41 Tom Seaver; 39 Doug Sisk; 27 Craig Swan; 49 Walt Terrell; 30 Mike Torrez	Catchers: 11 Mike Bishop; 20 Mike Fitzgerald; 42 Ron Hodges; 34 Junior Ortiz; 8 Ronn Reynolds; Infielders: 11 Tucker Ashford; 6 Wally Backman; 4 Bob Bailor; 7 Hubie Brooks; 19 Ron Gardenhire; 23 Brian Giles; 17 Keith Hernandez; 33 Clint Hurdle; 22 Mike Jorgensen; 26 Dave Kingman; 2 José Oquendo; 21 Gary Rajsich; 10 Rusty Staub	Outfielders: 9 Mark Bradley; 15 George Foster; 25 Danny Heep; 5 Mike Howard; 18 Darryl Strawberry; 1 Mookie Wilson; Other batters: 12 John Stearns	Manager: 31 George Bamberger; 55 Frank Howard; Coaches: 56 Gene Dusan; 51 Jim Frey; 55 Frank Howard; 54 Bill Monbouquette; 53 Bobby Valentine

== Player stats ==
= Indicates team leader

= Indicates league leader

=== Batting ===
==== Starters by position ====
Note: Pos = Position; G = Games played; AB = At bats; H = Hits; Avg. = Batting average; HR = Home runs; RBI = Runs batted in

Pos	Player	G	AB	H	Avg.	HR	RBI
C	Ron Hodges	110	250	65	.260	0	21
1B	Keith Hernandez	95	320	98	.306	9	37
2B	Brian Giles	145	400	98	.245	2	27
SS	José Oquendo	120	328	70	.213	1	17
3B	Hubie Brooks	150	586	147	.251	5	58
LF	George Foster	157	601	145	.241	28	90
CF	Mookie Wilson	152	638	176	.276	7	51
RF	Darryl Strawberry	122	420	108	.257	26	74

==== Other batters ====
Note: G = Games played; AB = At bats; H = Hits; Avg. = Batting average; HR = Home runs; RBI = Runs batted in

Player	G	AB	H	Avg.	HR	RBI
Bob Bailor	118	340	85	.250	1	30
Danny Heep	115	253	64	.253	8	21
Dave Kingman	100	248	49	.198	13	29
Junior Ortiz	68	185	47	.254	0	12
Rusty Staub	104	115	34	.296	3	28
Mark Bradley	73	104	21	.202	3	5
Ronn Reynolds	24	66	13	.197	0	2
Tucker Ashford	35	56	10	.179	0	2
Wally Backman	26	42	7	.167	0	3
Gary Rajsich	11	36	12	.333	1	3
Clint Hurdle	13	33	6	.182	0	2
Ron Gardenhire	17	32	2	.063	0	1
Mike Jorgensen	38	24	6	.250	1	3
Mike Fitzgerald	8	20	2	.100	1	2
Mike Bishop	3	8	1	.125	0	0
Mike Howard	1	3	1	.333	0	1
John Stearns	4	0	0	----	0	0

=== Pitching ===
==== Starting pitchers ====
Note: G = Games pitched; IP = Innings pitched; W = Wins; L = Losses; ERA = Earned run average; SO = Strikeouts

Player	G	IP	W	L	ERA	SO
Tom Seaver	34	231.0	9	14	3.55	135
Mike Torrez	39	222.1	10	17	4.37	94
Ed Lynch	30	174.2	10	10	4.28	44
Walt Terrell	21	133.2	8	8	3.57	59
Ron Darling	5	35.1	1	3	2.80	23
Tim Leary	2	10.2	1	1	3.38	9

==== Other pitchers ====
Note: G = Games pitched; IP = Innings pitched; W = Wins; L = Losses; ERA = Earned run average; SO = Strikeouts

Player	G	IP	W	L	ERA	SO
Scott Holman	35	101.0	1	7	3.74	44
Craig Swan	27	96.1	2	8	5.51	43
Neil Allen	21	54.0	2	7	4.50	32
Tom Gorman	25	49.1	1	4	4.93	30
Rick Ownbey	10	34.2	1	3	4.67	19

==== Relief pitchers ====
Note: G = Games pitched; W = Wins; L = Losses; SV = Saves; ERA = Earned run average; SO = Strikeouts

Player	G	W	L	SV	ERA	SO
Jesse Orosco	62	13	7	17	1.47	84
Doug Sisk	67	5	4	11	2.24	33
Carlos Diaz	54	3	1	2	2.05	64
Brent Gaff	4	1	0	0	6.10	4

== Awards and honors ==
- Darryl Strawberry, Rookie of the Year
- Keith Hernandez, Gold Glove

All-Star Game

- Jesse Orosco, Pitcher

== Farm system ==
Level	Team	League	Manager
AAA	Tidewater Tides	International League	Davey Johnson
AA	Jackson Mets	Texas League	Bob Schaefer
A	Lynchburg Mets	Carolina League	Sam Perlozzo
A	Columbia Mets	South Atlantic League	John Tamargo
A-Short Season	Little Falls Mets	New York–Penn League	Mike Cubbage
Rookie	GCL Mets	Gulf Coast League	Vern Hoscheit

LEAGUE CHAMPIONS: Tidewater, Lynchburg
