= Frank Cashen =

American baseball executive

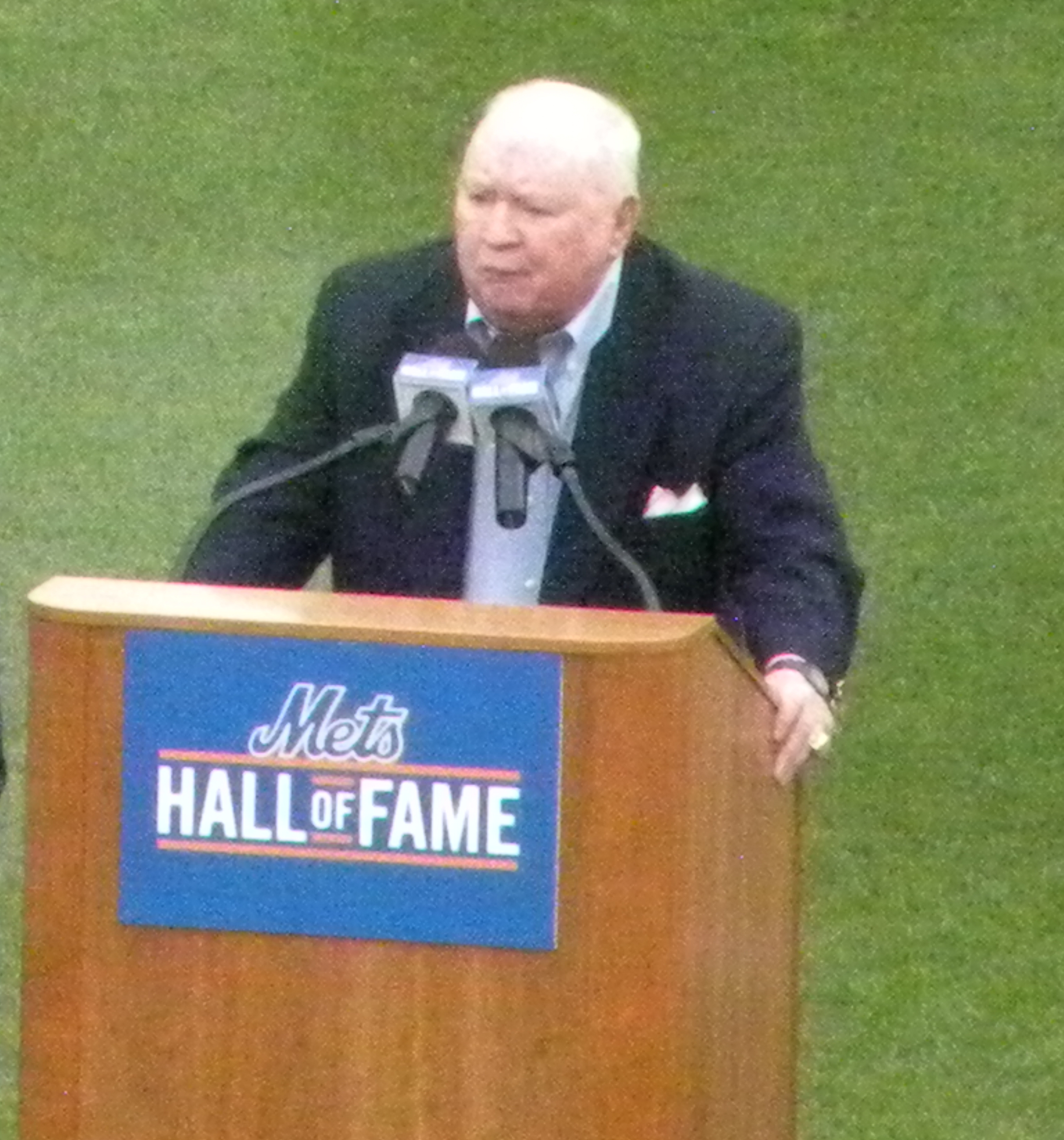
- Cashen speaking after being inducted into the New York Mets Hall of Fame, 2010
- General manager
- Born: September 13, 1925; Baltimore, Maryland, U.S.
- Died: June 30, 2014 (aged 88); Easton, Maryland, U.S.

Teams
- As general manager: Baltimore Orioles (1972–1975); New York Mets (1980–1991, 1993); As president: Baltimore Orioles (1966–1971)

Career highlights and awards
- 3× World Series champion (1966, 1970, 1986); Sporting News Executive of the Year (1986); Baltimore Orioles Hall of Fame; New York Mets Hall of Fame

John Francis "Frank" Cashen (September 13, 1925 – June 30, 2014) was an American Major League Baseball general manager. He was an executive when the Baltimore Orioles won the 1966 World Series and 1970 World Series, while also winning three consecutive AL pennants from 1969 to 1971. Later he became general manager of the New York Mets from 1980 to 1991, and the club won the 1986 World Series during his tenure.

== Early life ==
Cashen was born in Baltimore, Maryland, in 1925 and grew up admiring and playing baseball. He played second base at Loyola College in Maryland but was unable to hit well and did not pursue a playing career. Instead, he joined the Baltimore News-American becoming an award-winning sportswriter over 17 years at the newspaper. He spent nights at University of Maryland School of Law, graduating with a JD in 1958. He assumed his career would either be in journalism or law. Instead, he was hired by Jerry Hoffberger to be a publicity director for two Baltimore race tracks and later the advertising head at Hoffberger's National Brewing Company. In 1965, when Hoffberger's brewing company purchased the Baltimore Orioles in full (Hoffberger had been part-owner of the team since their arrival in 1954), Cashen eagerly accepted the position of executive vice president of the team.

== Baltimore Orioles ==
With Cashen overseeing baseball operations in Baltimore, general manager Harry Dalton made a deal to acquire future Hall of Famer Frank Robinson from the Cincinnati Reds, sending pitcher Milt Pappas, pitcher Jack Baldschun, and outfielder Dick Simpson. The following year, Robinson won the triple crown and Baltimore won the 1966 World Series for their first championship. In 1968, the Cashen/Dalton front office hired eventual Hall of Fame manager Earl Weaver. The Orioles won all three American League pennants from 1969 to 1971 and won the 1970 World Series. After 1971, Dalton left to become general manager of the Los Angeles Angels and Cashen took over G.M. duties for the Orioles.

Cashen was being mentioned as a candidate for the American League presidency and was a leading choice to replace Baseball Commissioner Bowie Kuhn when a group of team owners tried to oust Kuhn in 1975. Kuhn survived the storm of 1975. Also in 1975 Hoffberger's National Brewery merged with Carling Brewery (American Operation). Hoffberger requested Cashen to leave the Orioles and return to the Carling National Brewery as senior vice president of marketing and sales. In 1979, he returned to baseball when Commissioner Kuhn hired him as the administrator of baseball operations.

== New York Mets ==
In January 1980, Nelson Doubleday Jr. and Fred Wilpon bought the New York Mets after the Mets' third consecutive last-place finish. They were advised by several people to contact Cashen and, after he predicted four or five years for a turnaround, the new owners hired him for $500,000 over five years. Cashen hired public relations firm Della Femina Travisano & Partners. A new slogan, "The Magic Is Back!", was used along with television commercials emphasizing past New York area stars rather than the dismal Mets of the late 1970s.

On the field, the Mets made few trades early on, but took a chance with the first pick in the Major League Baseball draft to sign a talented, but raw high school player, Darryl Strawberry, who eventually finished his Mets career as the all-time franchise leader in home runs and RBIs. In 1981, Cashen promoted Hubie Brooks and Mookie Wilson to the majors for spring training and then traded for brash home run hitter Dave Kingman. In 1982, Cashen delighted New York fans by trading for former unanimous MVP, George Foster, who then signed a five-year, $10 million contract with the club. Two months later, Cashen alienated many fans by trading away fan favorite Lee Mazzilli, who soon declined while one of the two pitchers the Mets received, Ron Darling, became an All-Star and the other pitcher, Walt Terrell, was later traded for offensive star Howard Johnson. At the same time as the Mazzilli trade, the Mets were scouting young pitcher Dwight Gooden, who they picked in the 1982 draft. Gooden became the ace of the pitching staff through the Mets' strong years and championship.

While Foster and Kingman performed below expectations and the Mets finished poorly in both 1982 and 1983, Cashen made one of the most lopsided trades in franchise history, acquiring former MVP, batting champion, and 1982 World Champion member Keith Hernandez from St. Louis for pitchers Neil Allen and Rick Ownbey. Hernandez became a team leader both offensively and defensively while Allen was an average pitcher and Ownbey played in only 21 more games in the majors.

In 1984, Cashen hired Davey Johnson to be the Mets' manager for a $100,000 annual salary. Johnson had been the second baseman with the Orioles while Cashen was the G.M. After a successful 1984 season which saw the Mets first winning record since 1976, Cashen and the Mets traded Hubie Brooks and three others to the Montreal Expos for future Hall of Fame catcher Gary Carter, and most of the pieces were in place for a championship team. The Mets barely missed the playoffs in 1985 and then won the 1986 World Series with the best record of any team during the 1980s.

== Decline in New York ==
While Cashen was largely credited for building the Mets into the 1986 World Champions, he was quickly vilified for dismantling the franchise when a dynasty never materialized. In various transactions, future MVP Kevin Mitchell, scrappy clubhouse leaders Lenny Dykstra, Roger McDowell, and Wally Backman, as well as fan favorite Mookie Wilson and future All-Stars Rick Aguilera and Kevin Tapani, were traded away.

In return, the Mets received the hugely disappointing Juan Samuel as well as Frank Viola (who won 20 games in 1990 but was otherwise only average in less than three seasons with New York), Jeff Musselman (out of baseball after 1990), and four players who never played in the majors. Hernandez, Carter, and World Series MVP Ray Knight were either released or granted free agency in the years following the championship. Instead, the Mets' hopes were pinned on Gregg Jefferies, who soon faltered and was very unpopular on the team. After stumbling to a fifth-place finish in 1991, Cashen stepped down as the Mets' general manager, just five years after the franchise won the title.

== Later life ==
Following his tenure as general manager of the Mets, Cashen continued working with the team in various capacities, including chief operating officer in 1992 and consultant in 1993. In November 1998, the Mets general manager, Steve Phillips, took time off to address a sexual harassment lawsuit and Cashen was named interim GM for a week.

Cashen was inducted into the New York Mets Hall of Fame on August 1, 2010, alongside Davey Johnson, Dwight Gooden, and Darryl Strawberry. Cashen died on June 30, 2014, from congestive heart failure at the age of 88. Cashen and his wife Jean had seven children. Cashen was noted for frequently wearing a bow tie.

== Record as General Manager ==
Team	Year	Regular season					Postseason			
Team	Year	Games	Won	Lost	Win %	Finish	Won	Lost	Win %	Result
BAL	1972	154	80	74	.519	3rd in AL East	–	–	–	–
BAL	1973	162	97	65	.599	1st in AL East	2	3	.400	Lost ALCS (OAK)
BAL	1974	162	91	71	.562	1st in AL East	1	3	.250	Lost ALCS (OAK)
BAL	1975	162	90	69	.566	2nd in AL East	–	–	–	–
BAL total		640	358	279	.562		3	6	.333	
NYM	1980	162	64	98	.395	6th in NL East	–	–	–	–
NYM	1981	51	17	34	.333	5th in NL East	–	–	–	–
NYM	1981	52	24	28	.462	4th in NL East	–	–	–	–
NYM	1982	162	65	97	.401	6th in NL East	–	–	–	–
NYM	1983	162	68	94	.420	6th in NL East	–	–	–	–
NYM	1984	162	90	72	.556	2nd in NL East	–	–	–	–
NYM	1985	162	98	64	.605	2nd in NL East	–	–	–	–
NYM	1986	162	108	54	.667	1st in NL East	8	5	.615	Won World Series (BOS)
NYM	1987	162	92	70	.568	2nd in NL East	–	–	–	–
NYM	1988	160	100	60	.625	1st in NL East	3	4	.429	Lost NLCS (LAD)
NYM	1989	162	87	75	.537	2nd in NL East	–	–	–	–
NYM	1990	162	91	71	.562	2nd in NL East	–	–	–	–
NYM	1991	161	77	84	.478	5th in NL East	–	–	–	–
NYM	1993	14	4	10	.286	(interim)	–	–	–	–
NYM total		1,896	985	911	.520		11	9	.550	
Total		2,536	1,343	1,190	.530		14	15	.483	

== Death ==
Cashen died on June 30, 2014, at the age of 88, after a short illness.
