= Michael David Bishop =

Michael David Bishop may refer to:

- Michael Bishop, Baron Glendonbrook (born 1942), British businessman and politician
- Mike Bishop (baseball) (1958–2005), Major League Baseball player

== See also ==
- Michael Bishop (disambiguation)
