= Michael Bishop =

Michael Bishop may refer to:

== Music ==
- Michael Bishop (bassist) (born 1968), American bassist, member of GWAR and Kepone
- Michael Bishop (sound engineer) (1951–2021), American musical engineer

== Politics ==
- Michael Bishop, Baron Glendonbrook (born 1942), British businessman and politician
- Mike Bishop (Michigan politician) (born 1967), former Michigan State Senate majority leader and former U.S. representative from Michigan
- Mike Bishop (Arkansas politician), member of the Arkansas House of Representatives

== Sports ==
- Michael Bishop (cricketer) (born 1952), English cricketer
- Michael Bishop (quarterback) (born 1976), American quarterback in NFL, CFL, and Arena Football League
- Mike Bishop (baseball) (1958–2005), former Major League Baseball player

== Other ==
- Michael Bishop (author) (1945–2023), American science fiction/fantasy author
- Michael Bishop (literary scholar) (born 1938), Canadian author and academic
- J. Michael Bishop (1936–2026), American immunologist & microbiologist
- Mike Bishop (actor), Australian actor, director and drama coach
- Michael Bishop, main character in the TV series Nikita

== See also ==
- Michael David Bishop (disambiguation)
