= Ray Knight =

American baseball player and manager (born 1952)

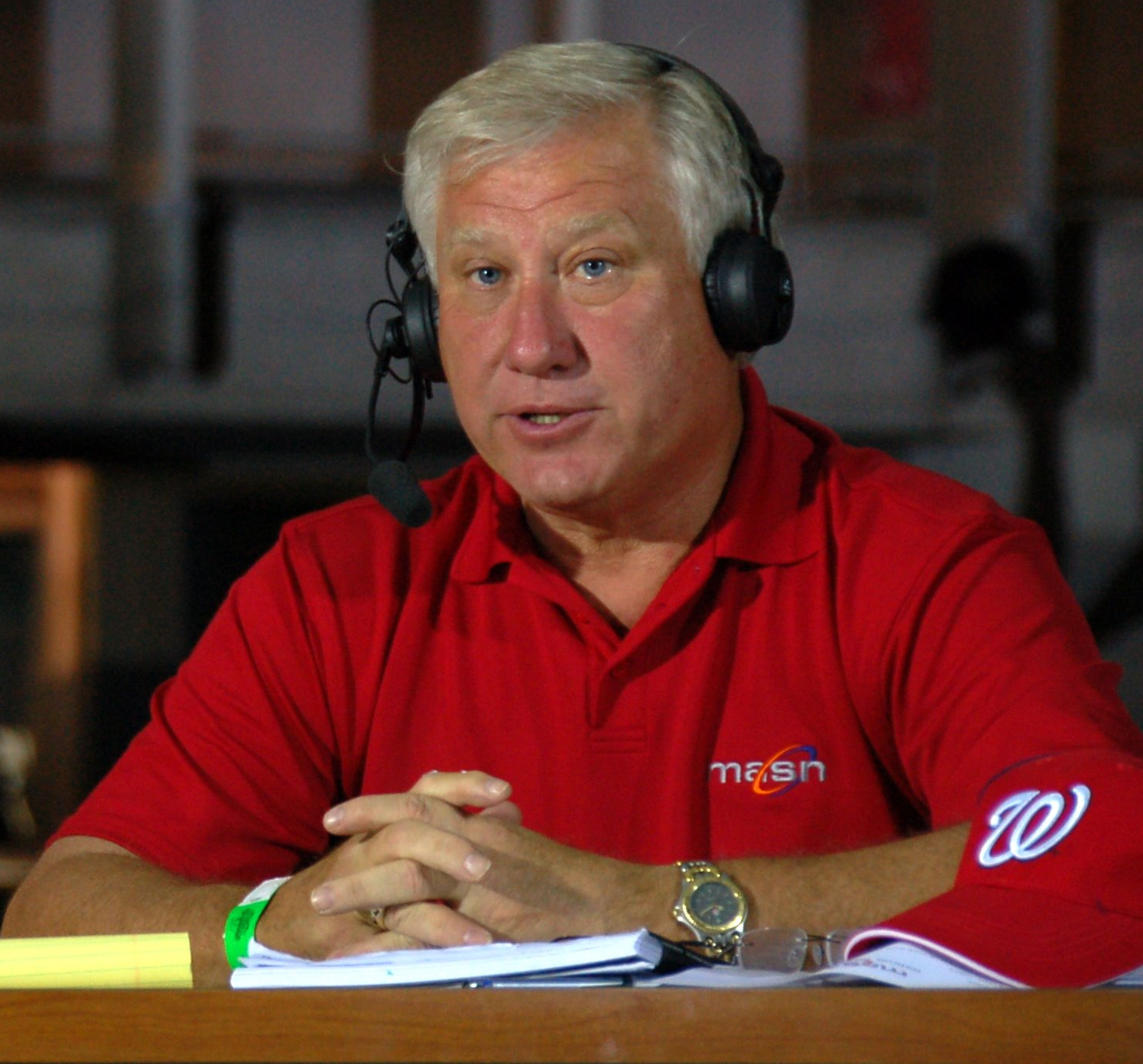
- Knight on Nats Xtra in 2007
- Third baseman / First baseman / Manager
- Born: December 28, 1952 (age 73); Albany, Georgia, U.S.
- Batted: Right Threw: Right

MLB debut
- September 10, 1974, for the Cincinnati Reds

Last MLB appearance
- October 2, 1988, for the Detroit Tigers

MLB statistics
- Batting average: .271
- Home runs: 84
- Runs batted in: 595
- Managerial record: 125–137
- Winning %: .477
- Stats at Baseball Reference

Teams
- As player: Cincinnati Reds (1974, 1977–1981); Houston Astros (1982–1984); New York Mets (1984–1986); Baltimore Orioles (1987); Detroit Tigers (1988); As manager: Cincinnati Reds (1996–1997, 2003)

Career highlights and awards
- 2× All-Star (1980, 1982); World Series champion (1986); World Series MVP (1986)

Charles Ray Knight (born December 28, 1952) is an American former infielder best remembered for his time with the Cincinnati Reds and New York Mets in Major League Baseball (MLB). Originally drafted by the Reds in the 10th round of the 1970 MLB draft, he is best remembered to Reds fans as the man who replaced Pete Rose at third base, whereas Mets fans remember Knight for scoring the winning run of game six of the 1986 World Series, hitting a go-ahead home run in game seven to give the Mets a lead they would not relinquish, and as the MVP of that series. He was most recently a studio analyst and occasional game analyst for the Mid-Atlantic Sports Network's coverage of the Washington Nationals from 2007 to 2018.

== Early life ==
Knight grew up in Albany, Georgia, and attended Dougherty High School and Albany Junior College.

== Career ==
=== Cincinnati Reds ===
Knight made his MLB debut with Cincinnati as a September call-up in 1974. He spent all of 1975 and 1976 with the triple-A Indianapolis Indians. In 1976, with only one home run coming into the final month of the season, Knight borrowed a bat from Reds star George Foster and hit nine in the remaining games of the year. He later borrowed Foster's bat again when Foster was injured. During those seasons, the Reds won two World Series titles. He returned to MLB in 1977.

Knight was a .232 hitter with two home runs and 19 runs batted in when he assumed the role of starting third baseman for the "Big Red Machine" following Rose's signing with Philadelphia Phillies in 1979. Knight responded with a .318 batting average, 10 home runs, 79 RBIs, and 64 runs scored to finish fifth in National League Most Valuable Player balloting.

On May 13, 1980, Knight broke out of an 0-for-15 slump by homering twice in the fifth inning of a 15–4 win over the Mets. He was the first Red to hit two home runs in one inning. Aaron Boone matched the feat on August 9, 2002. He made his first All-Star appearance in 1980, hitting a single off Tommy John in his first at-bat.

In 1981, Knight batted .259 with six home runs and 34 RBIs. On December 18, 1981, he was traded to the Houston Astros for César Cedeño, to accommodate Johnny Bench's move from behind the plate to third base.

=== Houston Astros ===
Knight split his time between third and first base with the Astros. He made the All-Star team in 1982 and played third base in the game. However, he made more appearances at first than he did at third during the regular season.

After batting .304 in 1983, Knight was batting only .237 in 1984 when he was traded on August 28, 1984, to the New York Mets for three players to be named later (Gerald Young, Manuel Lee, and Mitch Cook).

=== New York Mets ===
Knight platooned third base with the newly acquired Howard Johnson for the 1985 and 1986 seasons. In his first full season with the Mets, Knight batted only .218 with six home runs and 36 RBIs. During the off-season, the Mets attempted to trade Knight to the Pittsburgh Pirates for Lee Mazzilli, but were denied.

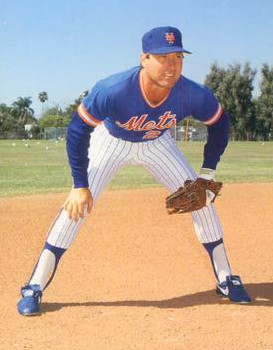
Knight in 1986

Knight adopted a new batting stance in 1986 and saw immediate results, crushing six home runs and batting .306 with 12 RBIs in April. Teammate Ron Darling spoke highly of Knight's contributions in a midseason interview: "Besides our pitching, it has been Ray Knight's emergence that has been the difference. He carried us for a long time." On July 22, Knight incited a bench-clearing brawl at Riverfront Stadium against his former teammates. Eric Davis pinch-running for Reds player/manager Pete Rose in the 10th inning stole second and third base. Knight took the throw from Mets catcher Gary Carter late, brought his glove to Davis' face and knocked his helmet off. A stare-off ensued, followed by a right cross from Knight. The benches emptied, and as a result of all the ejections from this fight (along with Darryl Strawberry who had previously been ejected for arguing balls and strikes), back-up catcher Ed Hearn was brought into the game, and Carter moved from behind the plate to third. The Mets won the game in 14 innings.

The Mets won 108 games in 1986 and took the National League East convincingly by 21.5 games over the Phillies. For the season, Knight batted .298 with 11 home runs and 76 RBIs to earn NL Comeback Player of the Year honors. Knight batted only .167 in the 1986 National League Championship Series against his former teammates, the Houston Astros. In the World Series, however, Knight broke out with a .391 batting average and five RBIs.

The Mets won the 1986 World Series in seven games over the Boston Red Sox. Trailing 5–3 with two outs in the bottom of the 10th inning of game six of the series, Knight drove in Gary Carter for the first run of the inning, and also pushed Kevin Mitchell to third, allowing him to score on Bob Stanley's wild pitch. Knight then scored the winning run from second after Mookie Wilson's ground ball went through the legs of Bill Buckner, and Knight's celebration as he rounded third to score was one of the indelible images of the series.

He hit the tiebreaking home run in game seven, and was rewarded with the World Series MVP award and the Baseball Writers' Association of America's Babe Ruth Award for the best performance in the World Series.

=== Baltimore Orioles ===
Unable to agree on a contract with general manager Frank Cashen for 1987, Knight became the first player to join a new team the season after winning the World Series MVP award, signing with the Baltimore Orioles. The Orioles finished sixth in the American League East in 1987, narrowly avoiding 100 losses (95). For his own part, Knight batted .256 with 65 RBIs and tied his career high with 14 home runs. Following the season, he was traded to the Detroit Tigers for pitcher Mark Thurmond. Knight served primarily as the Tigers' first baseman or designated hitter, though he did see some playing time at third and in the outfield. Knight batted only .217 with three home runs, and retired at the end of the season.

=== Career statistics ===
| Seasons | Games | AB | Runs | Hits | 2B | 3B | HR | RBI | SB | BB | SO | HBP | Avg. | Slg. |
|---|---|---|---|---|---|---|---|---|---|---|---|---|---|---|
| 13 | 1495 | 4829 | 490 | 1311 | 266 | 27 | 84 | 595 | 14 | 343 | 579 | 36 | .271 | .390 |

== After his playing career ==
Upon retiring from baseball, Knight became an ESPN broadcaster. He accepted his first coaching job with the Reds in 1993. Early in the 1995 season, Reds owner Marge Schott announced that Knight would replace Davey Johnson as manager of the Reds in 1996, regardless of how the Reds did. Schott and Johnson had never gotten along, and relations between the two had deteriorated to the point that she almost fired Johnson after the 1994 season. However, the Reds were doing so well under Johnson (they led the National League Central at the time of the 1994 Major League Baseball strike and won the division in 1995) that she instead opted to name Knight as assistant manager, with the understanding that he would succeed Johnson in 1996.

Knight managed the Reds from 1996 to 1997, and served as acting manager for a single game in 2003. He made his managerial debut on April 1, 1996, but the game was postponed when home plate umpire John McSherry suffered a severe cardiac episode and later died after only seven pitches. In 1997, he forgot how many outs had occurred in a half-inning in which the Reds were at bat and called for a bunt at an inopportune time. He later fined himself $250 for the incident. The team's lack of success would lead to his firing midway through the 1997 season in favor of Jack McKeon.

From 2007 to 2018, Knight was a broadcaster with the Mid-Atlantic Sports Network and co-hosted Nats Xtra, the network's pregame and postgame show for its Washington Nationals broadcasts. Johnny Holliday, Knight's fellow broadcaster and Nats Xtra co-host, playfully referred to him as the "Silver Fox".

=== Managerial record ===
As of August 2, 2016

| Team | From | To | Regular season record | | | Post–season record | | |
| Team | From | To | W | L | Win % | W | L | Win % |
|---|---|---|---|---|---|---|---|---|
| Cincinnati Reds | 1996 | 1997 | 124 | 137 | .475 | — | | |
| Cincinnati Reds | 2003 | | 1 | 0 | 1.000 | | | |
| Total | | | 125 | 137 | .477 | 0 | 0 | – |
Ref.:

== 1986 Mets reunion ==
Knight was one of several members of the 1986 championship team not to attend the 20th-anniversary celebration at Shea Stadium on August 19, 2006; the others included manager Davey Johnson, (who was managing Team USA in Cuba), Dwight Gooden (who was serving a jail sentence), Roger McDowell (who was the Atlanta Braves pitching coach at the time), Lee Mazzilli (who was the New York Yankees bench coach at the time), and pitching coach Mel Stottlemyre. Knight's absence was due to a previous commitment.

Another 1986 reunion was held, this one for the 40th anniversary, at Citi Field, the Mets' home since 2009, on August 1, 2026. The 73 year old Knight was pushed out onto the field in a wheelchair by his old Mets' platoon-mate, Howard Johnson.

== Personal life ==
Knight married LPGA golfer Nancy Lopez on October 25, 1982, in Pelham, Georgia. The wedding, the second for both, was at the home of his partner in a Pelham sporting goods store. Knight and Lopez met by chance in Korakuen Stadium in Tokyo in 1978. Lopez and he had three daughters together, Ashley Marie (1983), Erinn Shea (1986), and Torri Heather Knight (1991). They lived in Albany, Georgia, and also had a home in The Villages, Florida. Lopez designed her first golf course for The Villages and the three nines of the 27-hole Lopez Legacy course are named for the daughters: Ashley Meadows, Torri Pines, and Erinn Glenn. In 1985, he had a 7 handicap in golf and sometimes caddied for her, but not in big tournaments. Knight and Lopez divorced in 2009. A son from his first marriage, Brooks Knight, died in 2022.

In 2013, Phoebe Putney Hospital in Albany, Georgia, unveiled a street on the property named Ray Knight Way.

Knight is good friends with former Reds' teammate Harry Spilman, who grew up 29 minutes away from Knight in Georgia. While they were both in the Reds' system, the two spent $700 on a pitching machine to work on their hitting.

Knight is a member of the Golden Gloves boxing association.

On October 23, 2017, Knight was arrested after an altercation at his condominium in the Alexandria, Virginia, area with an unidentified 33-year-old man. Both were taken to the hospital and Knight was charged with assault and battery. The charges were subsequently dropped.

Knight participated in the 2021 ESPN 30 for 30 documentary series about the 1986 New York Mets season, Once Upon a Time in Queens.

== See also ==
- Houston Astros award winners and league leaders
