= Game-winning RBI =

Baseball statistic

A game-winning RBI (GWRBI) is a statistic that was used in Major League Baseball (MLB) from 1980 to 1988. Building upon the run batted in (RBI) statistic, the game-winning RBI was defined in MLB rules as "the RBI that gives a club the lead it never relinquishes."

For example: A batter on the winning team brought his team ahead 3–2 from a 2–2 tie at some point during the game and his team later led 5–2 as a result of the other batters. Then, the opposing team scored two more runs, making the final score 5–4. The batter on the winning team who batted in the third run would be credited with the game-winning RBI, even though the losing team scored four runs. That the statistic "did not adequately distinguish the achievement it was meant to reward" was one of the criticisms that led to the statistic being retired.

Since no RBI is credited when a run scores as the result of an error, stolen base, wild pitch, passed ball, balk - or when the batter grounds into a double play with a runner on third base and no outs, there were certain games in which no one got the game-winning RBI.

== Records ==
- Keith Hernandez had 129 game-winning RBI while these records were kept, more than any other player.
- Hernandez also had the most in a single season (24 in 1985). Mike Greenwell had the most in the American League (23 in 1988).
- Wally Joyner, Jose Canseco, and Mark McGwire each had 14 in their rookie years, the rookie record.
- Kirk Gibson had the game-winning RBI in five consecutive games in 1986.

== See also ==
- Walk-off home run
- Game-winning goal (hockey, soccer)
