= Danny Heep =

American baseball player (born 1957)

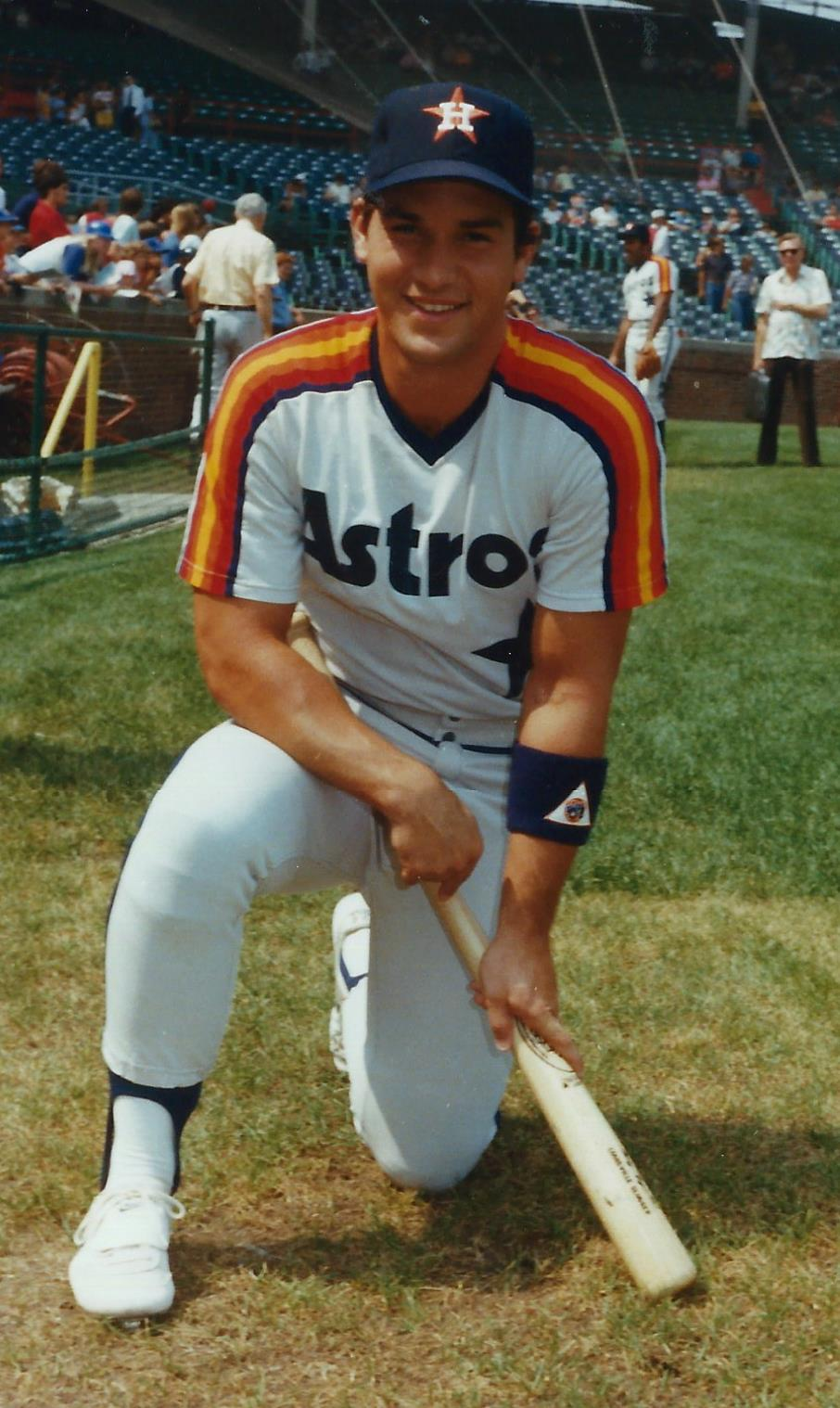
- Outfielder
- Born: July 3, 1957 (age 69); San Antonio, Texas, U.S.
- Batted: Left Threw: Left

MLB debut
- August 31, 1979, for the Houston Astros

Last MLB appearance
- June 8, 1991, for the Atlanta Braves

MLB statistics
- Batting average: .257
- Home runs: 30
- Runs batted in: 229
- Stats at Baseball Reference

Teams
- Houston Astros (1979–1982); New York Mets (1983–1986); Los Angeles Dodgers (1987–1988); Boston Red Sox (1989–1990); Atlanta Braves (1991)

Career highlights and awards
- 2× World Series champion (1986, 1988)

Daniel William Heep (born July 3, 1957) is an American former Major League Baseball outfielder.

Heep, who batted and threw left-handed, played for five different ballclubs during his 13-year career: the Houston Astros (1979–1982), New York Mets (1983–1986), Los Angeles Dodgers (1987–1988), Boston Red Sox (1989–1990), and Atlanta Braves (1991).

Heep played for two different World Series champions: the New York Mets in 1986, and the Los Angeles Dodgers in 1988.

== Baseball career ==
Heep played baseball for, and graduated from, Lee High School in San Antonio.

Heep played for St. Mary's University in San Antonio where he was twice an All-American, in 1976 and 1978, as a pitcher. At St. Mary's he earned his bachelor's degree in physical education, and he is a member of that school's Athletic Hall of Fame.

Originally drafted by the Houston Astros in the 1979 Major League Baseball draft, he compiled a .331 batting average, 23 home runs and 108 runs batted in (RBI) in a little over a year in the minors to earn his first major league call up. His major league debut came on August 31, 1979 against the New York Mets. He remained with the Astros through the end of the season, achieving a .143 average with two runs batted in. The second RBI was a game winner against the Los Angeles Dodgers on September 30. He was the Pacific Coast League batting champion with a .343 average with the Tucson Toros in 1980.

After hitting .237 with four home runs and 22 RBI in 85 games with the Astros in 1982, he was acquired by the New York Mets for Mike Scott at the Winter Meetings on December 10.

Danny Heep was the 4,000th strikeout victim of Nolan Ryan, on July 11, 1985.

== NCAA coach ==
Heep was the head coach for the NCAA Incarnate Word Cardinals in San Antonio from 1998 to 2017. During his tenure as head coach, the program won two conference tournament and three conference regular-season championships. In 2014, Incarnate Word became a Division I program in the Southland Conference.

=== Head coaching record ===
Below is a table of Heep's yearly records as a collegiate head baseball coach.

Record table
Season	Team	Overall	Conference	Standing	Postseason
Incarnate Word (Heart of Texas Conference – DII) (1998–1999)
1998	Incarnate Word	33-17			
1999	Incarnate Word	30-22	12-8		
Incarnate Word (Heartland Conference – DII) (2000–2010)
2000	Incarnate Word	20-28			
2001	Incarnate Word	35-21	12-4	1st	
2002	Incarnate Word	31-24			
2003	Incarnate Word	30-27			
2004	Incarnate Word	41-17			NCAA Regional
2005	Incarnate Word	35-19		1st	
2006	Incarnate Word	38-21		1st	NCAA Regional
2007	Incarnate Word	34-21			
2008	Incarnate Word	39-17	35-15	2nd	
2009	Incarnate Word	36-17	32-14		
2010	Incarnate Word	42-18	34-13	2nd	NCAA Regional
Incarnate Word (Lone Star Conference – DII) (2011–2013)
2011	Incarnate Word	37-18	24-9	1st	NCAA Regional
2012	Incarnate Word	23-21	16-11	3rd	
2013	Incarnate Word	26-26	12-16	6th	
Incarnate Word (Southland Conference – DI) (2014–2017)
2014	Incarnate Word	18-32	9-15	11th	ineligible
2015	Incarnate Word	21-33	11-19	11th	ineligible
2016	Incarnate Word	13-38	5-22	13th	ineligible
2017	Incarnate Word	20-36	8-22	12th	ineligible
Incarnate Word (Div. I):		72-139	33-78		
Total:		601-473			
National champion Postseason invitational champion Conference regular season champion Conference regular season and conference tournament champion Division regular season champion Division regular season and conference tournament champion Conference tournament champion

== Personal ==
His uncle was former major league catcher Matt Batts, who played for the Boston Red Sox, St. Louis Browns, Detroit Tigers, Chicago White Sox and Cincinnati Redlegs between 1947 and 1956.
