= New York Mets Hall of Fame =

MLB team hall of fame

Coordinates: 40°45′20.5″N 73°50′45.5″W

- Established: 1981
- Location: Citi Field, Willets Point, Queens, New York City, U.S.
- Type: Commemorative plaque

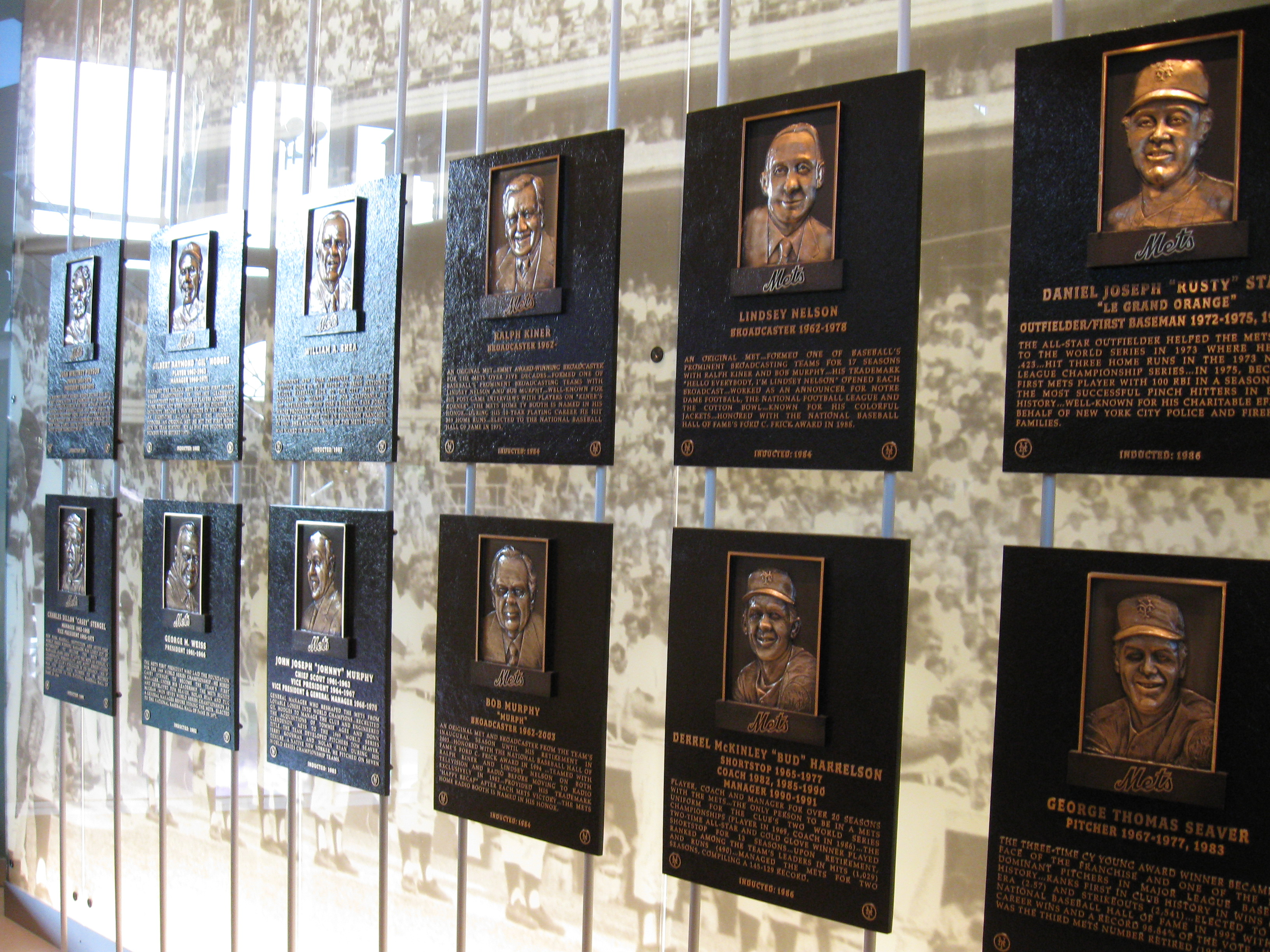
Plaques of the New York Mets Hall of Fame inductees in Citi Field, 2010

The New York Mets Hall of Fame was created in order to recognize the careers of former New York Mets players, managers, broadcasters and executives. There are presently 30 members. Originally located in the Diamond Club at Shea Stadium, the inductees were honored with plaques in the Mets Hall of Fame and Museum at Citi Field, which opened in April 2010. In Citi Field's first season, 2009, the space was part of the Mets Team Store. Following the 2023 season, the Hall of Fame plaques were moved to the Field Level of the Jackie Robinson Rotunda while the museum was closed to expand the Team Store. The museum reopened in a smaller space near the Bullpen Gate in 2024.

== Inductees ==
Key
Year	Year inducted
Bold	Member of the Baseball Hall of Fame
‡	Member of the Canadian Baseball Hall of Fame
†	Member of the Baseball Hall of Fame as a Met
Bold	Recipient of the Hall of Fame's Ford C. Frick Award

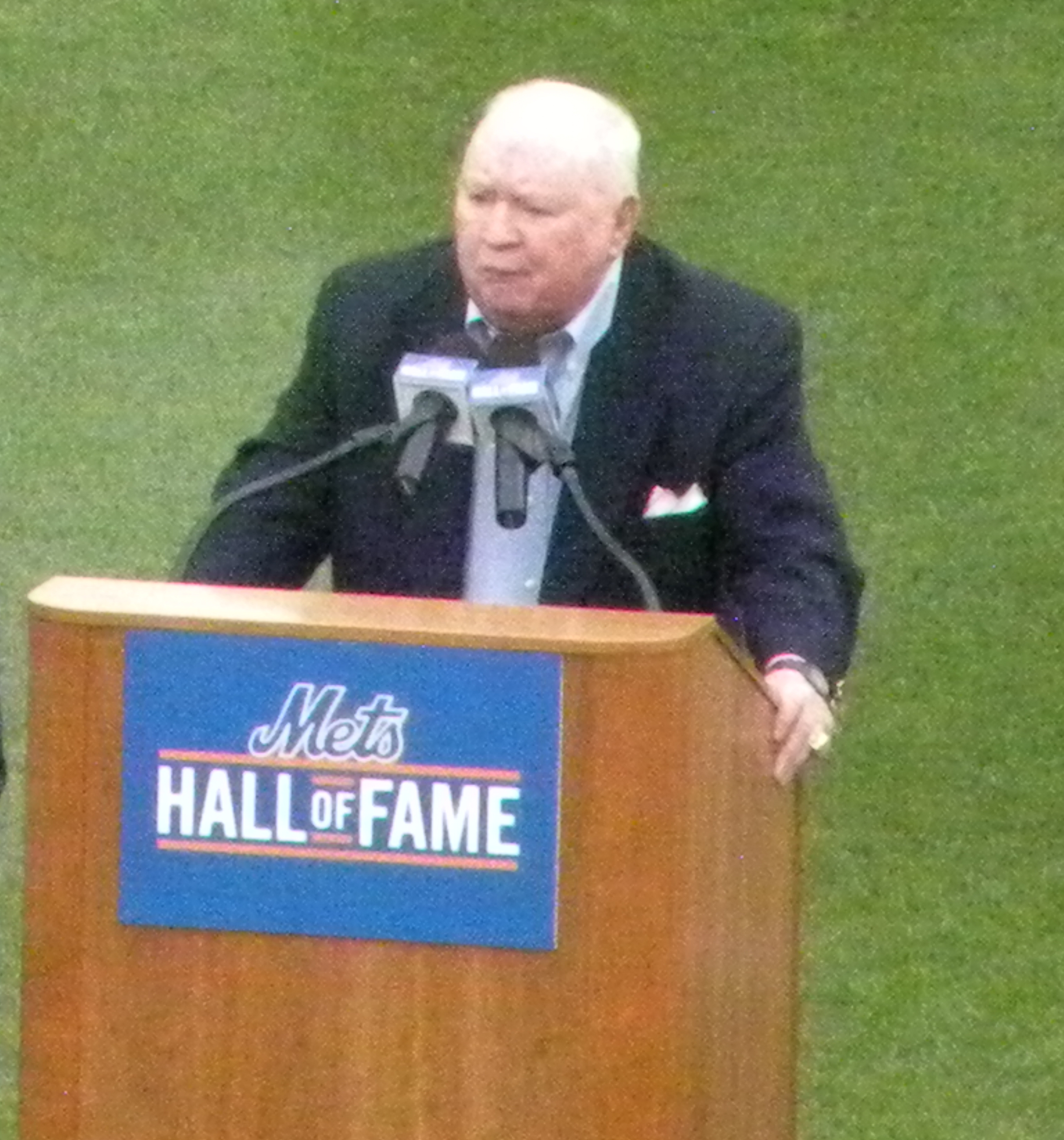
Frank Cashen speaking after being inducted into the Mets Hall of Fame

Year	No.	Name	Position(s)	Tenure
1981	—	Joan Whitney Payson	Owner; President	1960–1975; 1968–1975
1981	37	**Casey Stengel**	Manager; VP	1962–1965; 1965–1975
1982	14	**Gil Hodges**	1B; Manager	1962–1963; 1968–1971
1982	—	**George Weiss**	President	1961–1966
1983	—	Johnny Murphy	Chief Scout; VP; VP & GM	1961–1963; 1964–1967; 1968–1970
1983	—	William Shea	Proponent	
1984	—	**Ralph Kiner**	Broadcaster	1962–2013
1984	—	**Bob Murphy**^{†}	Broadcaster	1962–2003
1984	—	**Lindsey Nelson**^{†}	Broadcaster	1962–1978
1986	3, 23, 53	Bud Harrelson	SS; Coach; Manager	1965–1977; 1982, 1985–1990; 1990–1991
1986	4, 10	Rusty Staub^{‡}	RF / 1B; Broadcaster	1972–1975, 1981–1985; 1986–1995
1988	41	**Tom Seaver**^{†}	P Broadcaster	1967–1977, 1983; 1999–2005
1989	36, 47	Jerry Koosman	P	1967–1978
1990	7, 21	Ed Kranepool	1B	1962–1979
1991	12, 21, 34	Cleon Jones	LF	1963, 1965–1975
1992	15	Jerry Grote	C	1966–1977
1993	45	Tug McGraw	P	1965–1967, 1969–1974
1996	1, 51	Mookie Wilson	CF; Coach	1980–1989; 1997–2002, 2011
1997	17	Keith Hernandez	1B; Broadcaster	1983–1989; 2006–present
2001	8	**Gary Carter**^{‡}	C	1985–1989
2002	20	Tommie Agee	CF	1968–1972
2010	—	Frank Cashen	GM & COO	1980–1991
2010	16	Dwight Gooden	P	1984–1994
2010	5	Davey Johnson	Manager	1984–1990
2010	18	Darryl Strawberry	RF	1983–1990
2012	31, 45	John Franco	P	1990–2004
2013	31	**Mike Piazza**^{†}	C	1998–2005
2020/2021	13	Edgardo Alfonzo	2B / 3B	1995–2002
2020/2021	12	Ron Darling	P Broadcaster	1983–1991; 2006–present
2020/2021	32	Jon Matlack	P	1971–1977
2023	—	Gary Cohen	Broadcaster	1989–present
2023	—	Howie Rose	Broadcaster	1995–2026
2023	20, 44	Howard Johnson	3B	1985–1993
2023	22	Al Leiter	P	1998–2004
2025	5	David Wright	3B	2004–2016, 2018
2026	15	**Carlos Beltrán**^{†}	CF	2005–2011
2026	12, 16, 13	Lee Mazzilli	CF	1976–1981, 1986–1989
2026	2	Bobby Valentine	Manager	1996–2002

== See also ==
- New York Mets retired numbers
- New York Mets award winners and league leaders
