= Mike Howard =

American baseball player (born 1958)

- Outfielder
- Born: April 2, 1958 (age 67); Seattle, Washington
- Batted: both Threw: right

MLB debut
- September 12, 1981, for the New York Mets

Last MLB appearance
- April 5, 1983, for the New York Mets

MLB statistics
- Batting average: .182
- Home runs: 1
- Runs batted in: 7
- Stats at Baseball Reference

Teams
- New York Mets (1981–1983)

Michael Frederic Howard (born April 2, 1958) is a former Major League Baseball player for the New York Mets.

He was drafted by the Los Angeles Dodgers in the 6th round of the 1976 MLB draft and then selected by the Mets from the Dodgers in the 1978 Rule 5 draft. Howard broke into the big leagues at age 23, making his debut on September 12, 1981. His final major league game was played on April 5, 1983 – opening day. Howard singled off of future Hall of Famer Steve Carlton with the bases loaded in a scoreless game, earning the game winning RBI. He did not get another appearance before being sent down to the minors later that month, and never made it back to the major leagues.

== Sources ==
- Career statistics from Baseball Reference · Baseball Reference (Minors) · Retrosheet · Baseball Almanac
- Mike Howard profile provided by baseball-almanac.com
