= Rick Ownbey =

American baseball player (born 1957)

- Pitcher
- Born: October 20, 1957 (age 68); Corona, California, U.S.
- Batted: Right Threw: Right

MLB debut
- August 17, 1982, for the New York Mets

Last MLB appearance
- July 3, 1986, for the St. Louis Cardinals

MLB statistics
- Win–loss record: 3–11
- Earned run average: 4.11
- Strikeouts: 83
- Stats at Baseball Reference

Teams
- New York Mets (1982–1983); St. Louis Cardinals (1984, 1986)

Richard Wayne Ownbey (born October 20, 1957) is an American former Major League Baseball pitcher. He played in parts of four seasons in the majors, between 1982 and 1986, for the New York Mets and St. Louis Cardinals.

== Amateur career ==
Ownbey attended Savanna High School in Anaheim, California but, standing only 5 ft 7 in (1.70 m) and being only 16 years old as a senior, he failed to make the school's baseball team which featured players such as Glenn Hoffman and Marty Castillo. Ownbey entered the workforce after high school and began working at a lock factory for $5 per hour while pitching in an amateur baseball league. By the time he was 20, he had grown to 6 ft 3 in (1.91 m) and had attracted the attention of the head baseball coach at Santa Ana Junior College, his former high school gym teacher. Against the advice of friends and family, he quit his job at the lock factory in order to play college baseball.

== Professional career ==
=== Mets ===
While pitching at Santa Ana, Ownbey drew the attention of the Pittsburgh Pirates, who drafted him in the fourth round of the 1979 Major League Baseball draft. However, he did not sign. A year later, the Mets drafted him in the thirteenth round. In his first season of professional ball, Ownbey was 9–1 with a 1.80 earned run average for the Lynchburg Mets and Jackson Mets.

Ownbey made his major league debut on August 17, 1982, at Riverfront Stadium as the starting pitcher against the Cincinnati Reds. He gave up five runs in five innings pitched and took the loss. Ownbey was a combined 2–5 over his two seasons with the Mets before being traded with Neil Allen to the St. Louis Cardinals for Keith Hernandez on June 15, 1983.

=== Cardinals ===
Ownbey went 7–5 with a 3.63 ERA for the Louisville Redbirds of the American Association his first season in the Cardinals' organization. 1984, his first season in a Cardinals uniform, Ownbey went 0–3 with a 4.74 ERA in four starts. After spending all of 1985 in the minors, Ownbey reemerged with the Cards in 1986 pitching mostly out of the bullpen, and going 1–3 with a 3.80 ERA.

=== Royals ===
After becoming a free agent at the end of the 1986 season, Ownbey signed with the Kansas City Royals for 1987. He pitched only four innings for their double-A Southern League affiliate, the Memphis Chicks before calling it a career.

=== Career totals ===
W-L	PCT	ERA	G	GS	CG	SV	IP	BF	H	ER	R	HR	BB	K	WP	HBP
3-11	.214	4.11	39	19	2	0	146.2	657	67	75	12	91	83	197	3	3
