= Mookie Wilson =

American baseball player (born 1956)

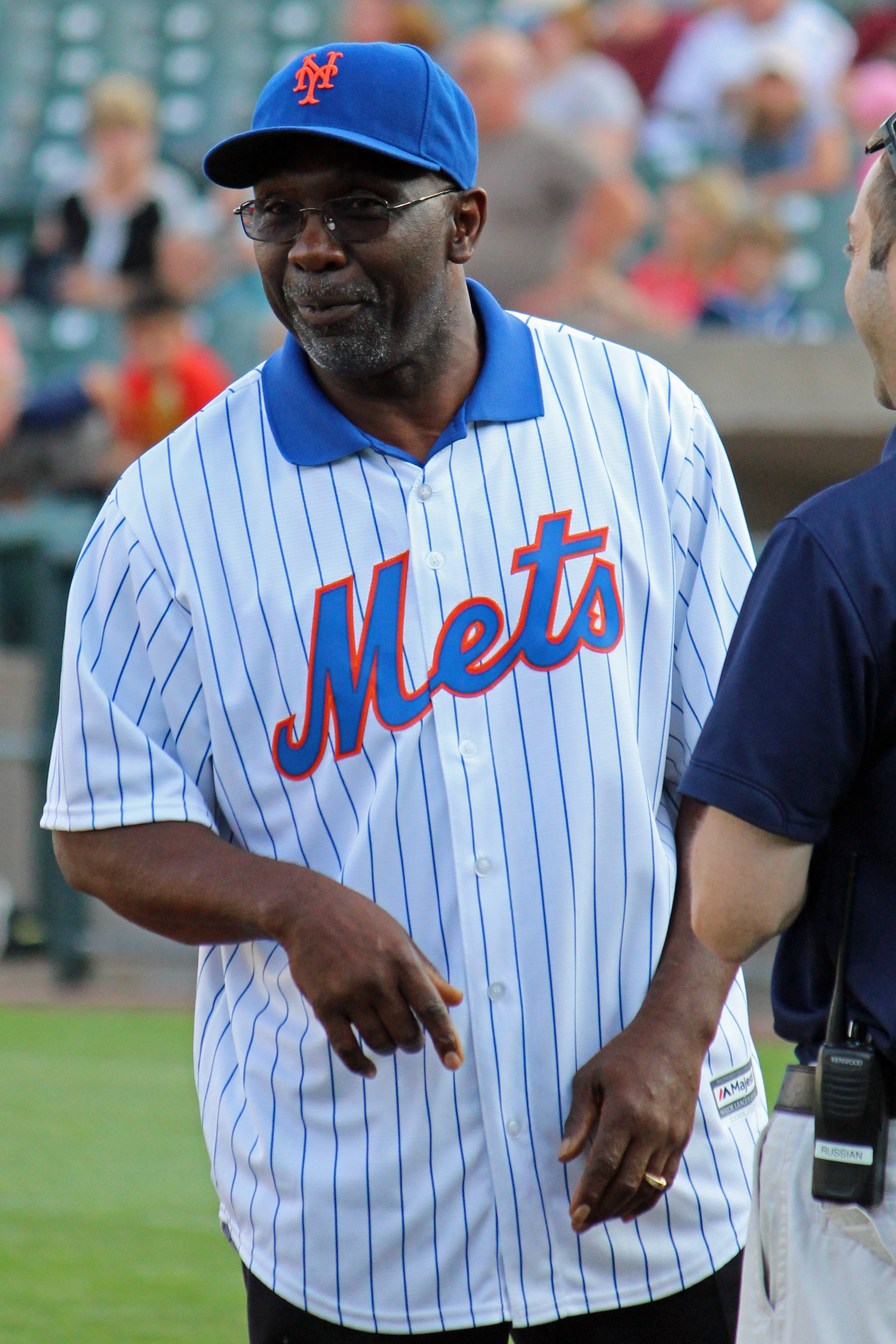
- Wilson in 2016
- Center fielder
- Born: February 9, 1956 (age 70); Bamberg, South Carolina, U.S.
- Batted: Switch Threw: Right

MLB debut
- September 2, 1980, for the New York Mets

Last MLB appearance
- October 6, 1991, for the Toronto Blue Jays

MLB statistics
- Batting average: .274
- Home runs: 67
- Runs batted in: 438
- Stolen bases: 327
- Stats at Baseball Reference

Teams
- As player: New York Mets (1980–1989); Toronto Blue Jays (1989–1991); As coach: New York Mets (1996–2002, 2011)

Career highlights and awards
- World Series champion (1986); New York Mets Hall of Fame

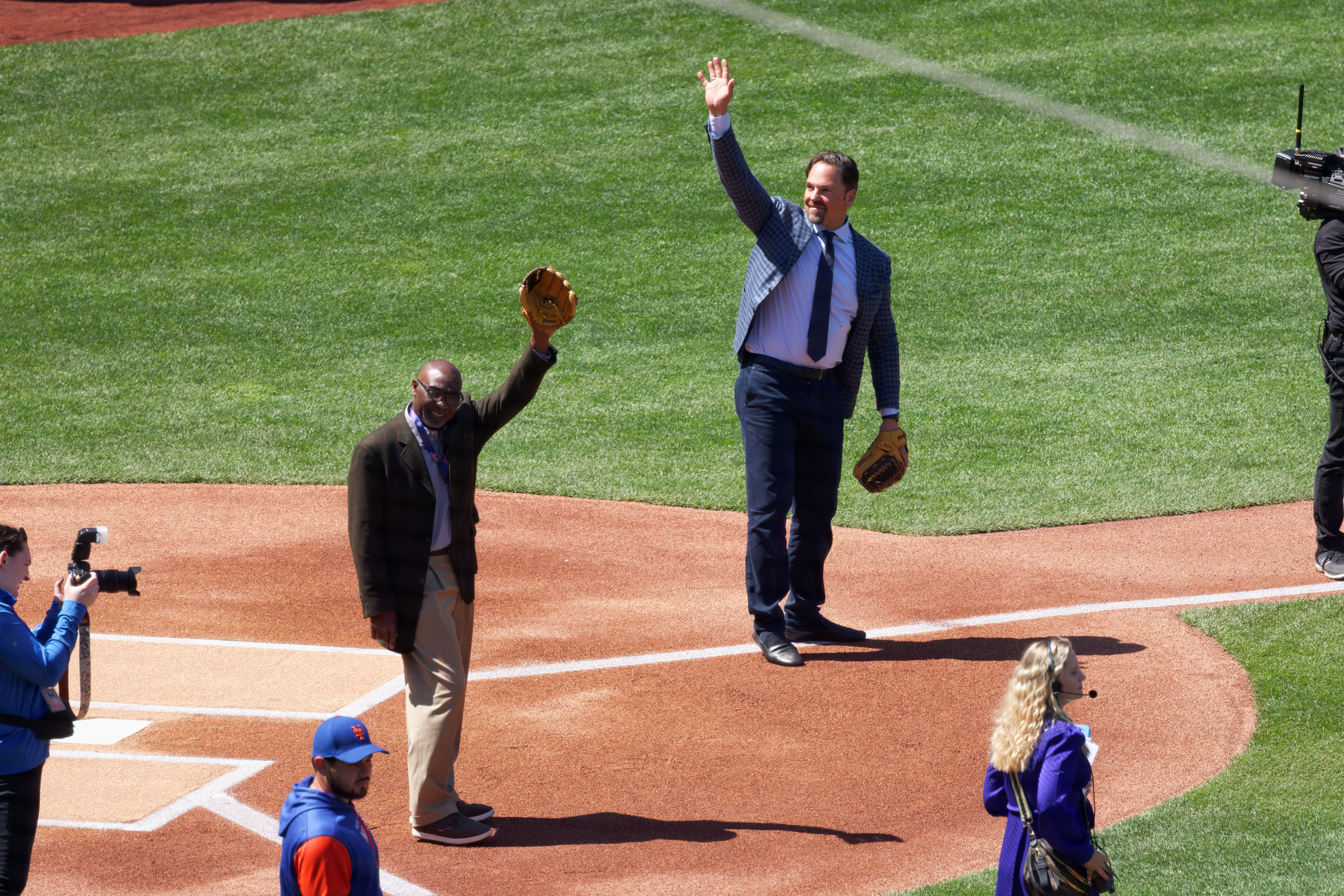
Wilson greets fans alongside Mike Piazza before catching a ceremonial first pitch

William Hayward "Mookie" Wilson (born February 9, 1956) is an American former Major League Baseball outfielder and coach who played for the New York Mets and Toronto Blue Jays over 12 major league seasons. He is best remembered as the Met who hit the ground ball that rolled through Bill Buckner's legs in the bottom of the 10th inning of game six of the 1986 World Series.

A switch hitter, his attitude and hustle resulted in a Mets fan base with precious few stars to root for when he first came up in the early 1980s. He was placed in the New York Mets Hall of Fame in 1996.

== Early life ==
Born in Bamberg, South Carolina, William Hayward Wilson was nicknamed Mookie as a small child. He pitched for the Bamberg-Ehrhardt High School Red Raiders baseball team under coach David Horton.

=== College ===
In the mid-1970s, South Carolina State University, a program located in Orangeburg, South Carolina, and near Wilson's hometown, discontinued its baseball program just days after Wilson had signed a letter of intent to play for the Bulldogs. As a result, Wilson attended Spartanburg Methodist College for the 1974 and 1975 seasons. While attending Spartanburg Methodist, Mookie was drafted by the Los Angeles Dodgers in the fourth round of the January 1976 amateur draft, but did not sign. Instead, Wilson transferred to play for The University of South Carolina Gamecocks, preferring to attempt to better his draft stock by playing for former New York Yankees great and fellow South Carolina native Bobby Richardson, who was the head coach of the Gamecocks at the time. The gamble paid off as Wilson was selected in the second round of the 1977 Major League Baseball draft by the New York Mets. He was part of the Gamecocks' second team to play for a national championship in Omaha, Nebraska, in the 1977 College World Series. He was also named to the 1977 All-Tournament team as an outfielder. Wilson earned a B.S. degree from Mercy College.

== Playing career ==
=== New York Mets ===
==== International League Rookie of the Year ====
Wilson batted .284 with 22 home runs, 184 runs batted in, and 160 stolen bases in four seasons in the Mets' farm system, and earned International League Rookie of the Year honors in 1979. After stealing 50 bases and scoring 92 runs for the Tidewater Tides in 1980, Mookie was called up to the majors when rosters expanded that September. Though he got off to a slow start (0 for his first 8), manager Joe Torre stuck with Wilson in center field for 26 of the 31 games remaining on the Mets' schedule.

==== Mets stolen base king ====
Wilson again got off to a slow start in 1981, with his batting average dipping to .203 on May 24. When Torre shifted Lee Mazzilli, who had been the Mets' center fielder and the face of the organization since his rookie year in 1977, to left field to make room for Mookie in center, he began to turn it around. He ended the first half of the strike-shortened season at .288 with 11 stolen bases, 21 runs scored and a .340 on-base percentage leading off for the Mets.

His average dipped to .259 in the second half; however, he still stole 13 bases and scored 28 runs. Two of the three home runs he hit in 1981 came in the second half, and both were of the game winning dramatic variety. On August 25, he hit a ninth-inning homer off Houston Astros closer Joe Sambito to carry the Mets to a 2–1 win. On September 20, he took St. Louis Cardinals closer and future Hall of Famer Bruce Sutter deep with Frank Taveras on second for the come from behind victory. With Wilson and fellow rookie Hubie Brooks now at the top of the Mets' lineup, the perennial cellar dwellers managed to compete in the second half of the season, finishing 5.5 games back of the National League East division winning Montreal Expos.

Mookie became a fixture atop the Mets' lineup through 1984, and was soon himself the face of the organization. In 1982, he stole at least one base in each of his first five games on his way to breaking Frank Taveras' team record with 58 stolen bases. He passed Mazzilli to become the team's all-time stolen base leader in 1984 (he has since been passed in both categories by José Reyes).

Wilson suffered the first injury of his career in 1985, missing two months of the season after undergoing arthroscopic surgery on his right shoulder. He returned in September, but in a very limited role. The second major injury of his career came the following spring, when Mets shortstop Rafael Santana nailed Wilson in the eye with a thrown ball during base running drills. Wilson needed to be carted off the field and required 21 stitches.

When he returned in May 1986, he was used more frequently in left field, as Lenny Dykstra was batting .300 as the Mets' new lead-off hitter and center fielder. Regardless of the negative effect the eye injury had upon his vision, he posted a respectable .979 fielding percentage, with seven assists, while committing just five errors splitting time between left and center. He also batted .289 with nine home runs, 25 stolen bases and 45 RBI as the Mets won first place in the NL East by 21.5 games over the Philadelphia Phillies.

==== 1986 World Series ====
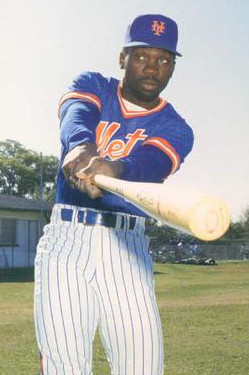
Wilson in 1986

In the postseason for the first time in his career, Wilson batted just .115 in the 1986 National League Championship Series against the Houston Astros. However, he scored the only run allowed by NLCS MVP Mike Scott in game four of the series, and drove in and scored a run in the ninth inning of game six when the Mets scored three runs in their last at bat to send the game into extra innings. He was batting a far better .273 in the World Series when he came to the plate in the tenth inning of game six.

The Boston Red Sox scored twice in the top of the tenth inning to go up 5–3 in a series they led three games to two. After retiring Wally Backman and Keith Hernandez, Red Sox relief pitcher Calvin Schiraldi surrendered singles to the next three batters to bring the score to 5–4 with runners on first and third. With Wilson stepping up to the plate, Bob Stanley replaced Schiraldi on the mound. During his ten pitch at-bat, Wilson avoided being hit by a wild pitch that scored Kevin Mitchell from third and tied the score. Three pitches later, at 3–2, he hit a roller up along first base to Bill Buckner. The ball went under Buckner's glove, through his legs and into right field, allowing Ray Knight to score the winning run from second base.

Wilson went one for three in game seven, scoring one of three runs the Mets plated in the sixth inning while trailing 3–0. The Mets went on to win the 1986 World Series.

==== Mets crowded outfield ====
The Mets acquired Kevin McReynolds to play left field prior to the start of the 1987 season, creating something of a logjam in their outfield. Both Wilson and Dykstra expressed displeasure with the situation, with Wilson going so far as to request a trade. His trade request went ungranted, and Mookie went on to post a career high .299 batting average platooning with Dykstra in center.

Mookie was having his poorest major league season in 1988. Through 104 games on the Mets' schedule, he was batting .234 with three home runs, 19 RBIs and 31 runs scored. Regardless, the Mets were still in first place in the NL East by four games over the Pittsburgh Pirates.

From there, he went on a tear; from August 3 to the end of the season, Mookie batted .385 with five home runs, 22 RBIs and 30 runs scored. He all but single-handedly beat the Pirates on September 5, matching his career high with four RBIs to give the Mets a ten-game lead in their division.

They went on to win 100 games that season, and win the division by 15 games. The Mets faced the Los Angeles Dodgers in the 1988 National League Championship Series, whom they had a 10–1 record against in 1988. Despite their regular season dominance over the Dodgers, the Mets lost the series in seven games. Wilson appeared in four games and collected two hits in 13 at bats.

Mookie could have become a free agent at the end of the 1988 season; however, the Mets picked up the option they had on his contract. He started the 1989 season batting just .199 through 52 games when the Mets acquired Juan Samuel from the Philadelphia Phillies in exchange for Dykstra and Roger McDowell with the intention of having Samuel take over as the Mets' new everyday center fielder and lead-off hitter.

=== Toronto Blue Jays ===
On July 31, the same day the Toronto Blue Jays selected Lee Mazzilli off waivers from the Mets, they also acquired Wilson, for reliever Jeff Musselman and minor league pitcher Mike Brady. Mookie Wilson was immediately plugged into the starting lineup, as right fielder Junior Felix had separated his shoulder against the right-field wall the previous day in Yankee Stadium.

After a slow start (6-for-40 in his first 10 games), Wilson came alive when he returned to Boston for the first time since the 1986 World Series. He went 9-for-14 with four runs scored and an RBI in the Jays' three-game sweep at Fenway Park. From there, they travelled to Baltimore to face the first-place Orioles. Wilson hit his first home run as an American Leaguer, as the Jays took two out of three from their division rivals. In all, he batted .432 over the rest of the month to help his new team jump into a first place tie with the Baltimore Orioles in the American League East. On September 1, Wilson went three for four with a run and an RBI against a trio of Minnesota Twins pitchers to help the Jays attain sole possession of first place. On September 30, with the Jays trailing 3–1 to the Orioles, Wilson singled in a run, and eventually came around to score the winning run in the Jays' division-clinching game.

The Jays returned to the postseason for the first time since 1985, but were handily defeated by the heavily favored AL champion Oakland Athletics in the 1989 American League Championship Series, four games to one. Mookie Wilson went two for four with an RBI and run scored in the Jays' game three victory.

After the season, Wilson signed a two-year deal to stay with the Jays as their starting center fielder. He logged 629 plate appearances in 1990, his most since 1983. At 34 years old, Mookie Wilson still stole 23 bases and hit four triples.

He relinquished the starting center field job to Devon White in 1991, and was part of a revolving door of left fielders employed by manager Cito Gaston. The system worked, as the Jays won their division by seven games over the Red Sox. In the postseason for the fourth time in six years, Wilson appeared in three of the five 1991 American League Championship Series games. He went two for eight with a walk.

The option was not picked up on Wilson's contract after the season. He nearly signed with the Red Sox for the 1992 season, but the Sox chose to go with Herm Winningham instead. When no one else showed interest in signing Wilson, he retired.

=== Career statistics ===
Years	Games	PA	AB	R	H	2B	3B	HR	RBI	SB	CS	BB	SO	AVG	OBP	SLG	FLD%
12	1403	5442	5094	731	1397	227	71	67	438	327	98	282	866	.274	.314	.386	.982

In 25 postseason games (1 World Series, 2 NLCS, 2 ALCS) Wilson hit .207 (19-for-92) with 10 runs, 4 RBI, 6 stolen bases and 7 walks.

== Post-playing career ==
From 1996–2002, Wilson served as the Mets' first-base coach. In 2003 and 2004, he managed the Rookie League Kingsport Mets team, and in 2005, Wilson managed the single-A Brooklyn Cyclones.

After serving as the organization's baserunning coordinator, Wilson returned as first-base coach in 2011. He moved into a front office job after the season, and was replaced at first base by Tom Goodwin. In 2013, he managed the U.S. Team in the All-Star Futures Game held at Citi Field.

== Personal life ==
The Mets drafted Wilson's brother John in the 17th round of the 1982 amateur draft. A speedster like his brother, John stole 56 bases for the Columbia Mets of the South Atlantic League in 1984. Mookie also has a brother, Phil, who played minor league ball for the Minnesota Twins and Montreal Expos. Another brother, Richard, is the biological father of former major league outfielder Preston Wilson. On June 22, 1978, Mookie Wilson married Preston's mother, Rosa Gilbert, making him both Preston's stepfather and uncle. Wilson was an outfielder for the Texas League Class AA Jackson Mets at the time of the wedding. The ceremony was conducted at the home plate of Smith-Wills Stadium in Jackson, Mississippi, before a hometown crowd of 1,200 and included an archway of bats held aloft by Wilson's teammates for the bride and groom's procession.

Wilson earned a bachelor's degree in 1996 from Mercy College in New York. He has been a resident of Lakewood Township, New Jersey, where he and his wife started an educational center for girls, "Mookie's Roses", in 1986.

In 2001, Wilson and his family released a gospel CD entitled Don't Worry, the Lord will Carry You Through.

Wilson became an ordained Baptist minister in 2014.

== See also ==
- List of Major League Baseball career stolen bases leaders

Sporting positions
Preceded by Razor Shines	New York Mets first base coach 2011	Succeeded by Tom Goodwin
