= Mike Bishop (baseball) =

American baseball player (1958-2005)

- Catcher
- Born: November 5, 1958; Santa Maria, California, U.S.
- Died: February 8, 2005 (aged 46); Bakersfield, California, U.S.
- Batted: Right Threw: Right

MLB debut
- April 16, 1983, for the New York Mets

Last MLB appearance
- April 24, 1983, for the New York Mets

MLB statistics
- Games played: 3
- At bats: 8
- Hits: 1
- Stats at Baseball Reference

Teams
- New York Mets (1983)

Michael David Bishop (November 5, 1958 – February 8, 2005) was an American Major League Baseball catcher. Listed at 6' 2", 188 lb., Bishop batted and threw right handed. He was born in Santa Maria, California.

The California Angels selected Bishop in the 12th round of the 1976 MLB draft. He then signed as a free agent with the New York Mets in 1983, appearing for them in just three games in his only season in the majors, while hitting .125 (1-for-8) with a double and two runs scored.

Besides catching, Bishop also played the four infield positions and as a corner outfielder during eight Minor League seasons spanning 1976–1983.

In between, he played winter ball with the Navegantes del Magallanes club of the Venezuelan Winter League in the 1981-82 season.

Bishop died in 2005 in Bakersfield, California, at the age of 46.
