= Ron Darling =

American baseball player and broadcaster (born 1960)

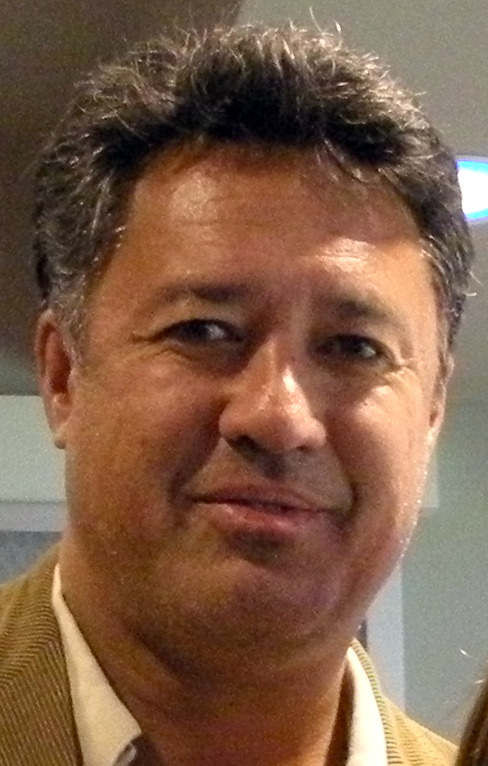
- Darling in 2009
- Pitcher
- Born: August 19, 1960 (age 66); Honolulu, Hawaii, U.S.
- Batted: Right Threw: Right

MLB debut
- September 6, 1983, for the New York Mets

Last MLB appearance
- August 15, 1995, for the Oakland Athletics

MLB statistics
- Win–loss record: 136–116
- Earned run average: 3.87
- Strikeouts: 1,590
- Stats at Baseball Reference

Teams
- New York Mets (1983–1991); Montreal Expos (1991); Oakland Athletics (1991–1995)

Career highlights and awards
- All-Star (1985); World Series champion (1986); Gold Glove Award (1989); New York Mets Hall of Fame

Ronald Maurice Darling Jr. (born August 19, 1960) is an American former professional baseball pitcher and television sports color commentator. He played in Major League Baseball (MLB) as a right-handed pitcher from 1983 to 1995, including as a member of the New York Mets team that won the 1986 World Series. Since 2006, he has been the co-lead color commentator for Mets broadcasts on SNY alongside former teammate Keith Hernandez.

Darling was a 1985 National League All-Star and won the 1989 Gold Glove Award for National League pitchers. He ranks fourth in Mets team history in wins (99) and is also in the top 10 in complete games, innings, strikeouts and shutouts. During the 1986 World Series, Darling allowed just three earned runs in 17 2/3 innings and won Game 4 in Boston to even the series. In 2020, Darling was inducted into the New York Mets Hall of Fame.

Darling had five pitches in his repertoire: the slider, a curveball, a circle changeup, a splitter, and a four seam fastball. In the beginning of his career, Darling's weak point was control, and he finished three seasons in the top four in base on balls; as his career progressed, his control improved considerably. He was considered one of the better fielding pitchers of the time and had one of the best pickoff moves among right-handed pitchers. An above-average athlete, he was sometimes used as a pinch runner and, in 1989, he hit home runs in two consecutive starts. Apart from his career with the Mets, Darling also played for the Montreal Expos and the Oakland Athletics.

Darling is a color commentator for nationwide baseball coverage on TBS, as well as for the Mets on both SNY and WPIX; he also co-hosts several MLB Network programs. In September 2022, he pre-recorded announcements for MTA NYCT's 7 line, along with Keith Hernandez and Gary Cohen.

== Early life ==
Darling was born in Honolulu, Hawaii, to an Hawaiian-Chinese mother and French Canadian father. After growing up in Millbury, Massachusetts, he attended St. John's High School in Shrewsbury, Massachusetts.

== College ==
Darling was recruited to play college football as a quarterback at Yale University for the Yale Bulldogs football team. He was also recruited by Andy Baylock to play football for the University of Connecticut. Darling transitioned to defensive back after finding that Yale had a glut of talent at the quarterback position. He quit the team after his freshman season and focused instead on baseball. He initially played shortstop for the Yale Bulldogs baseball team. Later in his collegiate career, he agreed to pitch only on the condition he be allowed to play shortstop and outfield on his days off.

In 1980, Darling played collegiate summer baseball for the Cotuit Kettleers of the Cape Cod Baseball League (CCBL). He batted .336 with six home runs while posting a 4–3 mark on the mound. At the league's all-star game at Yankee Stadium, he singled, doubled and homered as the CCBL left fielder, then came on in the final inning to pitch in relief, preserving the CCBL's one-run victory over the Atlantic Collegiate Baseball League. Darling was named the league's MVP and outstanding pro prospect, and was inducted into the CCBL Hall of Fame in 2002.

On May 21, 1981, Darling faced future Mets teammate Frank Viola, then playing for St. John's University, in an NCAA post-season game, and he had a no-hitter through 11 innings. In the 12th inning, St. John's broke up the no-hitter and then scored on a double-steal to beat Yale 1–0. Darling's performance remains the longest no-hitter in NCAA history. The game, considered by some to be the best in college baseball history, was the subject of a New Yorker story by the late Roger Angell, who attended the game.

Darling was set to graduate in December 1982, but was drafted by the Texas Rangers in June 1981.

Darling went on to play more games in Major League Baseball than any Yale alumnus, surpasing 19th-century pitcher Bill Hutchison. (Note: Darling played in more games than Hutchison but Hutchison pitched more innings) He was the last Yale Bulldog to reach the Major Leagues until pitcher Craig Breslow made his debut in 2005, and later Yale catcher Ryan Lavarnway in 2011.

He was elected to the College Baseball Hall of Fame class of 2024.

== Career ==
=== Minor leagues ===
The Texas Rangers selected Darling in the first round, with the ninth overall selection, of the 1981 MLB draft. He put up mediocre numbers with the AA Tulsa Drillers. He was traded along with Walt Terrell from the Rangers to the Mets for Lee Mazzilli on April 1, 1982. For the Mets, Darling and Terrell would eventually combine for seven double-digit win seasons. Three seasons later, the Mets traded Terrell to the Detroit Tigers for Howard Johnson. For Texas, Mazzilli never regained his limited glory of the late 1970s.

Darling would have compiled decent numbers with the AAA Tidewater Tides in 1982 and 1983 except for very high base on balls counts during both seasons. Despite his control problems, Darling was called up to the majors in late 1983. The Mets had the worst record in the National League and second-worst in the majors when Darling debuted on September 6, 1983. He was impressive in that start but left the game down 1–0 in a game the Mets lost 2–0. The Mets were also last in offense in the N.L. Each of Darling's first three starts — in which he went 0–3 — were all decent pitching performances (11 strikeouts, 9 walks, 2.08 ERA, and 6 runs over the course of the three starts). He finished his season with a complete game victory and was in the Majors for good.

=== New York Mets ===
==== Building to a championship ====
In 1984, Darling won a spot in the starting rotation and maintained a spot there almost uninterrupted until 1990. While his early walk percentages were poor—he even led the league in walks in 1985—he never again showed the terrible walk percentages he had while playing in Triple-A.

With Darling and Terrell each getting their first long-term chances in the Majors and with the debut of young star and eventual Rookie of the Year Dwight Gooden, the Mets went from second-worst in the majors in 1983 to fourth-best in the majors in 1984; the Mets finished second-best in their division and missed the postseason. Darling had difficulty pitching on the road in 1984 compared to pitching at pitcher-friendly Shea Stadium; his road ERA was more than 50% higher than his home ERA. He had a streak of seven wins in seven starts in June (5–0) and July (1.88 ERA) including a pair of complete game four-hit shutouts, but the other two-thirds of the season were not nearly as successful. The Mets were in first place at the end of July but Darling's 2–6 record the rest of the way was little help, and the Chicago Cubs won the division by 6 1/2 games. Darling finished 12–9 overall with a 3.81 ERA.

The 1985 season was an improvement for Darling, despite a career-high and NL-leading 114 walks. His April included a one-hit seven-inning no-decision and a five-hit shutout with 11 strikeouts.

On July 4, Darling pitched on one day of rest, making the only relief appearance of his first seven seasons during a marathon 19-inning 16–13 win. Darling finished the legendary game in which 13 runs were scored in the extra innings alone; during that game, the Mets blew four leads and nearly blew a fifth. After starting 9–2, he was selected to his only All-Star team but did not participate in the game. Overall, he posted his career-best winning percentage in 1985 with a 16–6 record. His record could have been even better but in eight of his starts, he received seven no-decisions and a loss despite allowing less than two earned runs in each game. On October 1, Darling pitched nine shutout innings on only four hits, but the game was scoreless until the 11th. The Mets narrowly missed the postseason, but Darling established himself as a clear number-two starter behind Gooden's untouchable 24–4 season.

==== World Series ====
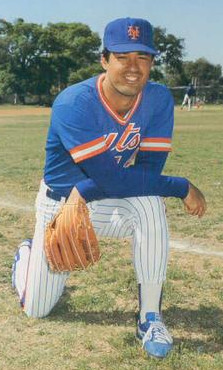
Darling in 1986

In 1986, everything came together for the Mets, and Darling was no exception. He finished with a 15–6 record and posted a career-best 2.81 ERA, which was third-best in the NL. He also received the only Cy Young Award votes of his career, finishing fifth behind Mike Scott of the Astros. The Mets led the way most of the season, and their top four starters all received Cy Young votes. On May 27, Darling tied his career-high with 12 strikeouts in a five-hit complete game victory which, despite a poor April, raised his record to 6–0. He was good on the road but even better at home with a 10–2 record at Shea. His worst blemish was off the field when on July 19, he and teammates Bob Ojeda, Rick Aguilera, and Tim Teufel were arrested outside a bar in Houston for fighting with security guards (who were also off-duty police officers). All four were released in time for the following game. Darling and Teufel pleaded guilty in 1987 to a misdemeanor charge of resisting arrest, were sentenced to a year of probation, and were ordered to pay $200 fines. The probation period was cancelled by a judge one month later. The incident fed into the Mets' reputation as a rowdy crew that season, although Jeff Pearlman wrote in his book The Bad Guys Won that the four players involved were among the few exceptions, and the incident started when the normally placid Tim Teufel—being treated to drinks by the others to celebrate becoming a father—got more drunk than he ever had in his life and mouthed off to security guards who were looking for a fight. Despite the run-in, Darling was featured on the cover of the August 25 issue of Sports Illustrated.

The 1986 National League Championship Series was tied 1–1 when Darling started Game 3, but he pitched poorly and left after giving up four runs in five innings. The Mets recovered to win both the game and eventually the series. Darling opened the World Series against the Boston Red Sox. He pitched extremely well in Game 1, allowing only a single unearned run over seven innings, but lost a hard-luck 1–0 game to Bruce Hurst. With the Mets in danger of falling into a 3–1 series deficit, Darling started Game 4 and extended his 0.00 ERA to 14 innings as the Mets won easily, 6–2. After Game 6, the Red Sox bounced back in Game 7, scoring three early runs against Darling. Shaky into the fourth inning, Darling was relieved, but the Mets recovered to win their second World Championship.

==== Post-championship decline ====
Darling went 12–8 in 1987 but had to battle most of the way, as did the rest of the team. Darling's April ERA was over 6.00, and he did not win a game in either May or June, going 0–4 with 8 no-decisions between victories. He rebounded to win six consecutive starts after the All-Star break, but a good second half only lowered his ERA to 4.29—the worst of his first seven seasons. On June 28, Darling had a no-hitter through seven innings, but the Mets wound up losing the game. They were poised for a run at the division in mid-September when Darling went out with one of the few injuries of his career. He missed the last couple weeks of the season and the Mets missed the postseason.

In 1988, Darling bounced back with a career-high 17 wins. He started quickly with two shutouts in his first four games. A first-half 10–5 record with 3 shutouts and a 2.70 ERA were not enough to earn an All-Star spot. On the season, he compiled a career-high 4 shutouts but also suffered one of his worst games, getting knocked out in the first inning of an 11–2 loss on July 19. Darling's home-versus-road discrepancy was enormous as he went 14–1 at Shea and only 3–8 on the road with a road ERA more than twice as high as his home ERA. He finished the season strong, winning his last five decisions. The Mets coasted into the playoffs, but Darling pitched poorly in the 1988 National League Championship Series against the Los Angeles Dodgers.

With the series tied 1–1, he fell into an early 3–0 hole, but the Mets bounced back twice to win 8–4. In the deciding Game 7, Darling was again matched against 1988's best pitcher, Orel Hershiser, and he was over-matched. Darling gave up six runs and was knocked out in the second inning while Hershiser pitched a five-hit shutout, shocking the Mets and winning the series' Most Valuable Player award. The one-sided game was the last postseason appearance for the Mets until 1999.

After their 100-win 1988 season ended, the Mets started a decline that lasted well into the 1990s. Darling's 1989 started as poorly as 1988 had ended when he lost his first 3 starts with an ERA of 11.57. He recovered with a good May but was inconsistent for the entire season, finishing 14–14 with a 3.52 ERA. Darling's five losses in his last seven starts contributed to the Mets missing the postseason. Darling did become the first Mets pitcher to win the Gold Glove Award. He was also the last NL pitcher to win the award before Greg Maddux's remarkable streak of 13 consecutive Gold Gloves. On August 10, 1989, Darling won his 83rd game with the Mets to move him past Jon Matlack into fourth on the Mets' all-time wins list where he remains today (behind Tom Seaver, Dwight Gooden, and Jerry Koosman).

In 1990, the Mets were in transition, and manager Davey Johnson's job was in jeopardy. Darling was sent to the bullpen part-time for the first time in his career. His first relief performance in late April went well but was followed by three terrible starts. The rest of his season was a mix of starting and relief. With an ERA of 4.60 in late August, Darling was in the bullpen for the next month. He made two starts to close out his season and won them both, but the Mets could not catch the Pittsburgh Pirates. In total, 1990 was Darling's first losing season (7–9) and it was his worst ERA to-date.

=== Trade and American League ===
Darling was back in the New York Mets' starting rotation in 1991. Although his pitching was improved over 1990, he was still inconsistent, winning three games with scoreless pitching but getting hit hard in many other games. Unlike previous seasons, Darling posted poor numbers at Shea Stadium while pitching well on the road. He pitched scoreless two-hit ball over eight innings against the Montreal Expos on the road in his second-last game with the Mets. On July 15, 1991, Darling was traded with a minor leaguer to Montreal for former closer Tim Burke. Darling's three starts for Montreal were poor, with an ERA of 7.41, and on July 31, 1991, the Expos traded him to the Oakland Athletics for two minor leaguers. After the Darling trades, the Expos were left with three minor leaguers, none of whom played more than two games in the majors.

With Oakland, Darling immediately logged two seven-inning scoreless starts and won his first three decisions. Then, his poor control returned and Darling lost seven straight decisions including his last six starts. In three of those losses, he allowed two or fewer runs. Oakland, coming off its third consecutive league pennant, was barely above .500 before acquiring Darling. His acquisition did little to affect Oakland's record.

After the 1991 season, Darling became a free agent and re-signed with Oakland. In 1992, he had his last quality year, finishing with more than 200 innings pitched, a 3.66 ERA, and 15 wins. Inconsistent for most of the season, Darling also showed flashes of brilliance, including three complete game two-hit shutouts—the only two-hitters of his career. He was the victim of poor run support including a no-decision seven-inning one-hitter that was nearly a loss, an eight-inning two-hitter that turned into a no-decision after an unearned run, and two other games where he allowed one earned run and took the loss. Darling finished with the best record on the team percentage-wise. Oakland coasted into the postseason with little trouble, and Darling was called to start Game 3 with the series tied. He pitched well but gave up two costly home runs and took the loss. The A's went on to lose Games 4 and 6 as well and Darling never again pitched in the postseason.

Darling re-signed with Oakland again after 1992, this time a multi-year deal for over $2 million per season, but he was unable to repeat his 1992 performance. The 1993 season was awful for Darling. Through July, his ERA hovered around 6.00, and he was relegated to long relief for over a week. He pitched better after July, lowering his ERA to 5.16, but lost five of his last six decisions.

Outside of July, Darling's 1994 would have been as bad as 1993. In July, he won five starts with one no-decision with an ERA under three. It was Darling's last hurrah. He stumbled through two starts in August before the 1994 Major League Baseball strike ended the season. With his torrid July, Darling reached double digits in wins once again but finished under .500 with a 4.50 ERA. Darling led the American League with 25 games started despite pitching that was average at best.

When the strike lasted into 1995, Darling started terribly, logging an ERA over 9.00 in his four starts without making it through the fifth inning in any of them. His only complete game of the season ended with a 1–0 loss on May 30. Darling won only four games with an ERA of 6.23. After a bad loss, Oakland released him on August 19, 1995 (his 35th birthday), bringing his playing career to an end.

== Career statistics ==
In a thirteen-season major league career, Darling posted a 136–116 won-loss record with 1,590 strikeouts and a 3.87 ERA in 1,620 innings pitched, including 13 shutouts and 37 complete games. He ranks fourth in Mets team history in wins (99) and is also in the top 10 in complete games, innings, strikeouts and shutouts.

== Post-retirement ==
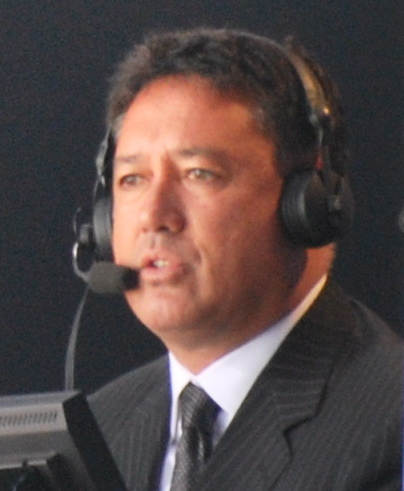
Darling in the broadcast booth during a Mets game at Citi Field in 2010

Since 2000, Darling has been active in television. He worked as a broadcaster for the Oakland Athletics, had a Fox show called Baseball Today, and appeared on The Best Damn Sports Show Period. He also provided baseball analysis for the YES Network, Fox Sports Net and, in 2004, CSTV.

Darling appeared on the Hall of Fame balloting for 2001, receiving only one vote and thus was removed from further consideration. On January 28, 2020, the Mets announced that Darling would be inducted into the New York Mets Hall of Fame on May 17 in a ceremony at Citi Field. The ceremony was moved to July 31, 2021.

In 2005, Darling was involved in banking ventures in Southern California. He was then hired to be the television color commentator for the inaugural season of the Washington Nationals. Darling worked alongside veteran play-by-play announcer Mel Proctor on the Mid-Atlantic Sports Network (MASN), which suffered from low viewership due to legal battles between Baltimore Orioles owner Peter Angelos and Comcast cable television. Darling and Proctor were not asked to return to MASN by the Nationals for 2006.

In 2006, Darling was hired by SportsNet New York as a color commentator and studio analyst for the New York Mets, joining radio veteran Gary Cohen and former Mets teammate Keith Hernandez. Darling also appears on some of the SNY-produced WPIX broadcasts in the New York Metropolitan Area. He won an Emmy Award as Best Sports Analyst for his work on the Mets broadcasts. He appeared in a Sovereign Bank commercial in 2008, which is frequently shown on SNY and is often joked about among the three Mets broadcasters during games.

He threw out the ceremonial first pitch during Game 7 of the 2006 NLCS at Shea Stadium.

In 2007, Darling was a color analyst for TBS's coverage of the 2007 MLB Playoffs. He was paired with play-by-play man Dick Stockton. As of 2008, he provided commentary for the network's regular-season coverage, paired with Chip Caray. During the playoffs, he joined Caray's other regular partner, Buck Martinez.

In 2013, Darling joined MLB Network as a studio analyst.

In 2015, Darling volunteered to provide play-by-play commentary for television broadcasts of Mets spring training games.

In April 2019, Darling took a leave of absence from the Mets booth for health reasons.

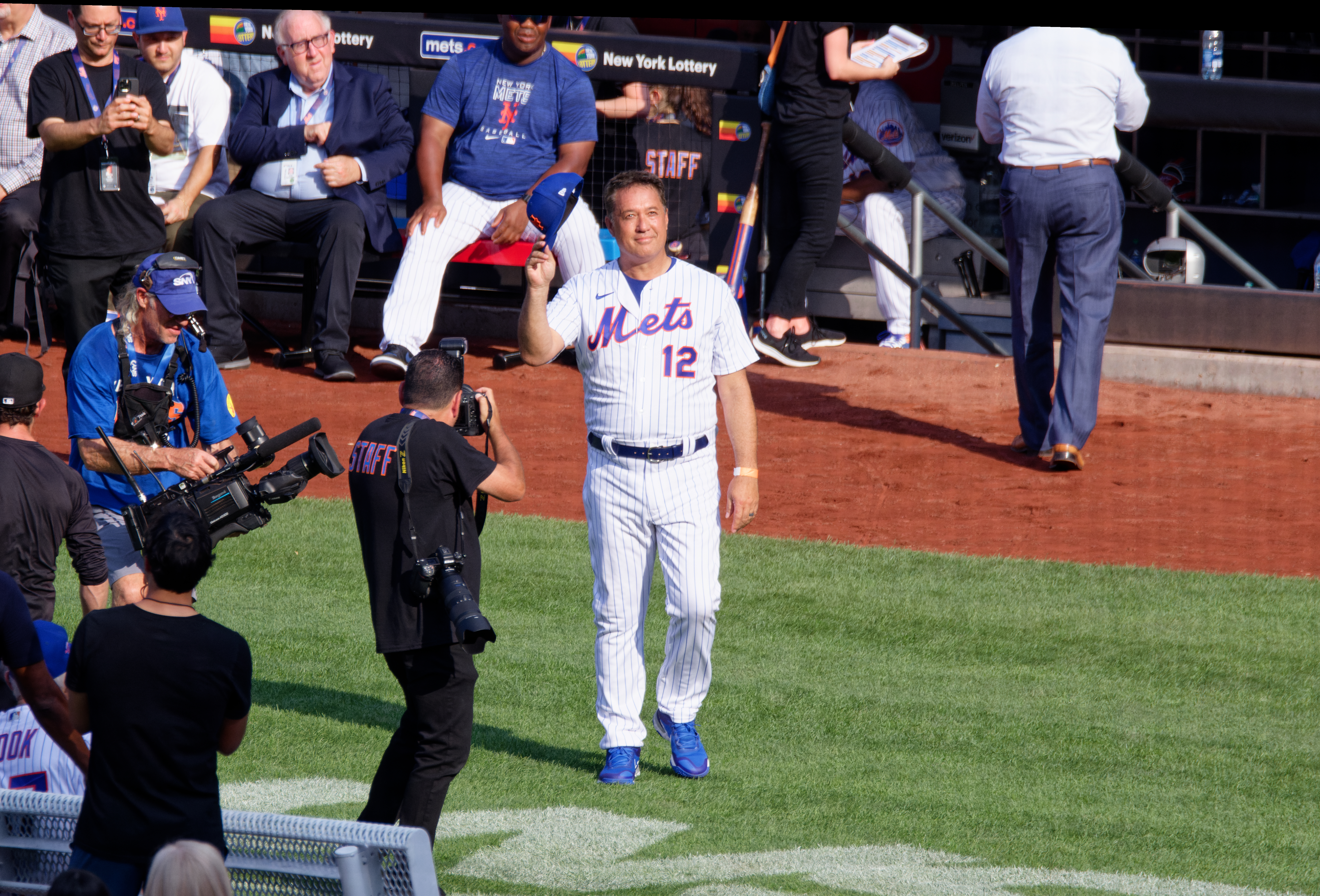
Darling at the Mets' Old-Timers' Day in 2022

Darling is also a New York Times best-selling author and has written three books. In 2019, Darling published his third book, a series of interconnected anecdotes of a variety of baseball players in 108 Stitches: Loose Threads, Ripping Yarns, and the Darndest Characters from My Time in the Game. Following the book's publication, former Met teammate Lenny Dykstra sued Darling for defamation, writing that Dykstra used racial slurs toward Red Sox pitcher Oil Can Boyd during the 1986 World Series—a claim that Dykstra denied. The lawsuit was later dismissed by the judge, ruling that Dykstra's reputation was so poor that it was not legally possible to libel him.

== Personal life ==
Ron was married to Irish Wilhelmina model Antoinette (Toni) O'Reilly, with whom he had two children, Tyler Darling and Jordan Darling. She had small roles on television and in movies, sometimes using her married name, Toni Darling. During their marriage, they appeared in numerous magazine features together.

His first apartment on his own after joining the Mets was in a five-story walk-up on East 53rd Street in Manhattan.

In 2004 in Sonoma, California, Darling married Joanna Last, a makeup artist for Fox Sports. They have lived in Williamsburg, Brooklyn, the Upper East Side of Manhattan, and Rowayton, Connecticut. In February 2016 they had a son, Ronald Maurice Darling III.

His younger brother, Edwin, a first baseman, was drafted by the New York Yankees in 1981 and played 69 games in their farm system over two seasons.

On May 6, 2019, Darling announced that he had been diagnosed with thyroid cancer.

=== In pop culture ===
Darling was the cover model for the August 1986 issue of GQ.

Game 6 of the 1986 World Series, broadcast by NBC, ran so long that the network chose not to air Saturday Night Live rather than show it after the game. When it was shown for the first time two weeks later, Darling filmed a special introduction, apologizing on behalf of the Mets for preempting SNL.

In 1988, Darling appeared in an episode of Sesame Street in which he taught Telly Monster about baseball statistics.

Darling was on the cover of the baseball video game R.B.I. Baseball '95.

Darling had small roles in the films Shallow Hal and The Day After Tomorrow; he also played himself in Mr. 3000.

== Bibliography ==
- The Complete Game: Reflections on Baseball, Pitching, and Life on the Mound. (Alfred A. Knopf, March 2009)
- Game 7, 1986: Failure and Triumph in the Biggest Game of My Life. (St. Martin's Press, April 2016)
- 108 Stitches: Loose Threads, Ripping Yarns, and the Darndest Characters from My Time in the Game. (St. Martin's Press, April 2019)

== See also ==
- List of Washington Nationals broadcasters

== Sources ==
- Darling, Ron (2009). The Complete Game: Reflections on Baseball, Pitching, and Life on the Mound. New York: Alfred A. Knopf.
