= Arlene Hirschfeld =

American community activist (born 1944)

- Born: Arlene Friedman; 1944 (age 81–82); Denver, Colorado, US
- Education: B.A. English, University of Denver, 1966
- Occupation: Community activist
- Years active: 1980s–present
- Spouse: A. Barry Hirschfeld
- Children: 2
- Awards: Colorado Women's Hall of Fame, 2006

Arlene Hirschfeld (born 1944) is an American community activist. Since the 1980s, she has served on the board of trustees of numerous Denver and Colorado state organizations, working in advisory, leadership, and fundraising capacities. The recipient of numerous awards, she was inducted into the Colorado Women's Hall of Fame in 2006.

== Early life and education ==
Arlene Friedman was born in 1944 in Denver, Colorado. She earned her B.A. in English from the University of Denver in 1966.

From 1966 to 1970, she taught English at the Abraham Lincoln High School in Denver, also serving as an American Field Service sponsor.

== Community activism ==
Hirschfeld became active in local and state organizations and nonprofits on an almost full-time basis beginning in the 1980s. She is a member of the board of trustees of the Denver Art Museum, the MDC Richmond American Homes Foundation, the Children's Diabetes Foundation of Denver, Breathe Better Foundation, the Mizel Museum, and the Colorado Governor's Residence Preservation Fund. She is an honorary trustee of the Women's Foundation of Colorado, and an emeritus member of the board of trustees of the Anti-Defamation League.

She was the first Jewish president of the Junior League of Denver (1986–1987), and the first woman board chair for the Rose Community Foundation (2006–2008). She also chaired the Allied Jewish Federation (now JewishColorado). As a member of the steering committee of the Dean's Council at Harvard Divinity School, she was involved in raising $1 million to endow one of the five scholars of that university's Women's Studies in Religion Program.

== Awards and honors ==
Hirschfeld has received many awards, including the 1991 Community Service Award from the University of Denver, the 1997 Denver Women of Distinction award from Girl Scouts of Colorado, the Ellis Island Medal of Honor, the 2002 Rex Morgan Award, the 2003 Colorado Philanthropy Day Outstanding Volunteer Fundraiser Award, and the Martin Luther King, Jr. Business Social Responsibility Award. She was inducted into the Colorado Women's Hall of Fame in 2006. She received a Lifetime Achievement Award from Metro Volunteers in 2015. She and her husband were the 2018 recipients of the Community Service in the Arts Award from the Bonfils–Stanton Foundation.

== Personal life ==
She married A. Barry Hirschfeld, an MBA graduate of the University of Denver, in 1966. They have two sons. Barry became the owner of A. B. Hirschfeld Press (later known as National Hirschfeld, closed in 2009) founded by his grandfather in 1907, and A. B. Hirschfeld & Sons, a real estate company. In the mid-1970s, the couple purchased Shangri-La, an 8,000-square-foot (740 m^{2}) Denver mansion built by movie theater owner Harry E. Huffman as a replica of the monastery featured in the 1937 film Lost Horizon.
