= Shangri-La (house) =

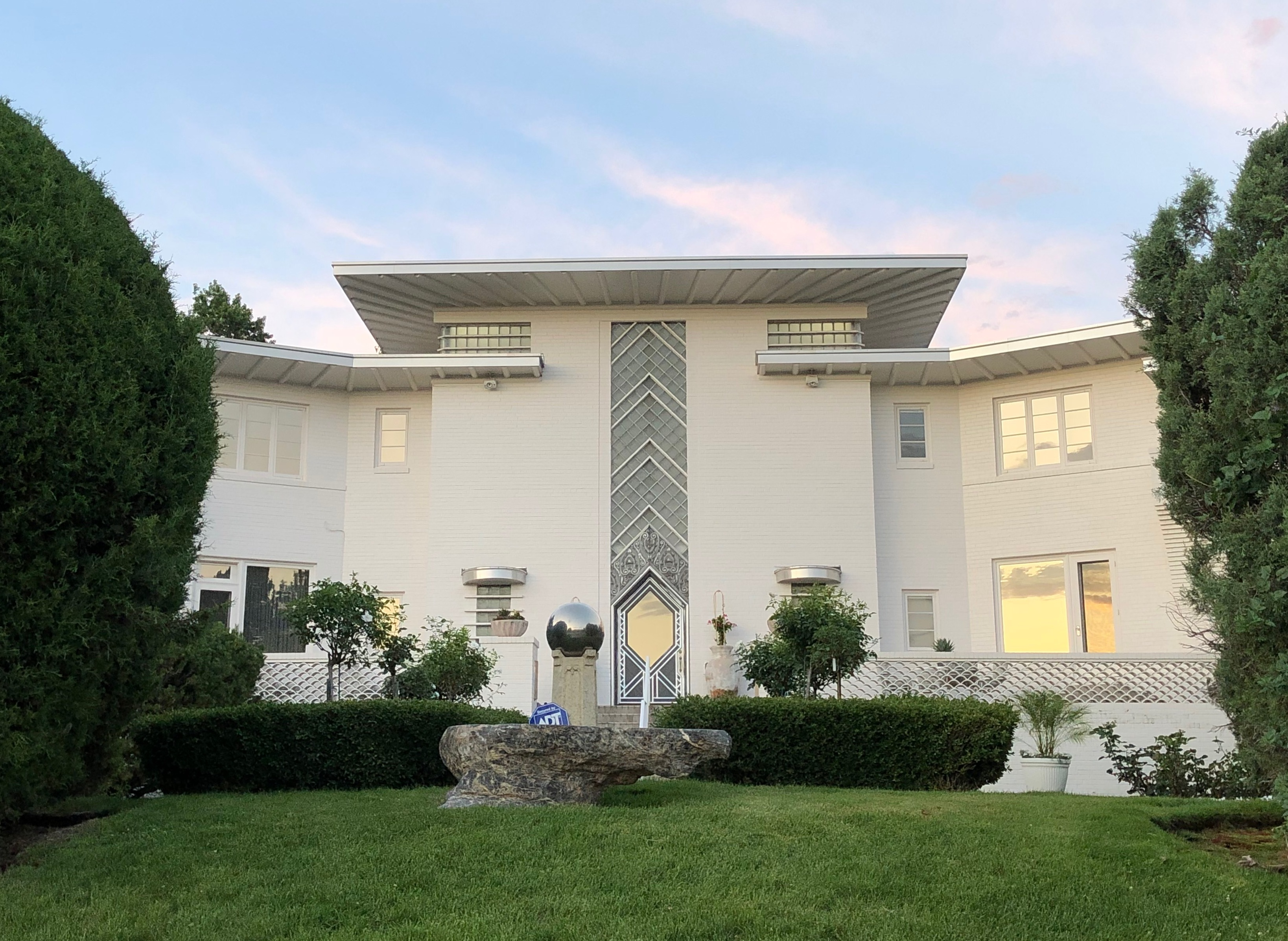
- Interactive map of the Shangri-La area
- Etymology: Fictional valley in the 1937 film Lost Horizon

General information
- Status: Completed
- Type: Residence
- Architectural style: Streamline Moderne with Art Deco elements
- Location: Denver, Colorado, US, Shangri La Drive
- Coordinates: 39.7140°N 104.9379°W
- Completed: 1938
- Owner: A. Barry and Arlene Hirschfeld

Technical details
- Floor count: 2
- Floor area: 8,000 square feet (740 m^{2})
- Grounds: 5-acre (2.0 ha)

Design and construction
- Architect: Raymond Harry Ervin

Other information
- Number of rooms: 13

Shangri-La is a Streamline Moderne mansion in Denver, Colorado, United States. Commissioned by Denver movie theater magnate Harry E. Huffman and designed by architect Raymond Harry Ervin, it is a replica of the fictional monastery featured in the 1937 film Lost Horizon. Built on a 5-acre (2.0 ha) tract of land in 1937–38, it was occupied by Huffman and his wife until 1969. Beginning in 1962, the west lawn was subdivided and populated with additional upscale housing, including Cableland, and the circular drive was remapped as Shangri La Drive. The current owners of the house are A. Barry and Arlene Hirschfeld.

== History ==
The 5-acre (2.0 ha) tract of land on which the house and its grounds originally stood was purchased by Denver movie theater owner Harry E. Huffman in the mid-1930s. Huffman hired Denver architect Raymond Harry Ervin to design the structure, which he and his wife Christine wanted to replicate the fictional monastery featured in the 1937 film Lost Horizon. Ervin reportedly referred to the plans for the model constructed on the Columbia Ranch film set to produce his 1937 design. Construction was completed in 1938. The house was named Shangri-La after the fictional valley featured in Lost Horizon.

The house was noted as one of the "finest buildings" in Denver in a 1939 survey by Architectural Record. The 1951 issue of Popular Gardening and Living Outdoors cited Mrs. Huffman's picturesque garden, which included a large section of four-leaf clovers.

The house was built in 1938 in an area of Hilltop now known as Shangri-La Heights. The house was initially located outside the city. Its original address was 13 Leetsdale Drive. Huffman and his wife hosted gala parties here, inviting many prominent guests from the business and entertainment worlds.

=== Subdivision of grounds ===
Beginning in 1962, the west lawn was subdivided and built up with additional upscale homes. These included Cableland, owned by Bill Daniels, which was bequeathed to the City of Denver for use as the official mayoral residence after Daniels' death. Shangri-La's circular drive was remapped as Shangri La Drive.

=== Later owners ===
Huffman's nieces inherited the mansion when he died in 1969. They sold it to David Rumbough, a 21-year-old student at the University of Denver who had toured the mansion along with nearly 10,000 other visitors during a 1971 Designer Show House tour benefitting the Children's Hospital Fund. Rumbough listed the house for sale after four years, but died in a boating accident before it was sold.

The mansion was purchased from Rumbough's estate by A. Barry and Arlene Hirschfeld, both Denver natives. A. Barry Hirschfeld owned a printing company established by his grandfather in 1907 as well as a real estate firm; his wife is a committee member of many local boards and organizations.

== Description ==
Shangri-La is a two-story mansion in Streamline Moderne style. The façade is white with "silver trim and accents". It is fronted by a two-story Art Deco entrance made of concrete and glass block.

Inside the entrance hall is a sweeping staircase to the upper floor, as in the film model. The interior includes 13 rooms, with a total floor space of 8,000 square feet (740 m^{2}).

The house is notable for having maintained its original architectural appearance and landscaping plan.

== Sources ==
- Bretz, James (2005). Mansions of Denver: The Vintage Years 1870–1938. Pruett Publishing. ISBN 9780871089373.
- Leonard, Stephen J.; Noel, Thomas Jacob (1990). Denver: Mining camp to metropolis. University Press of Colorado. ISBN 9780870811852.
- Noel, Thomas Jacob; Norgren, Barbara S. (1987). Denver: The city beautiful and its architects, 1893–1941. Historic Denver. ISBN 9780914248040.
- "Gardens". Popular Gardening and Living Outdoors. 2. 1951.
