= Cableland =

Official residence of the mayor of Denver, Colorado

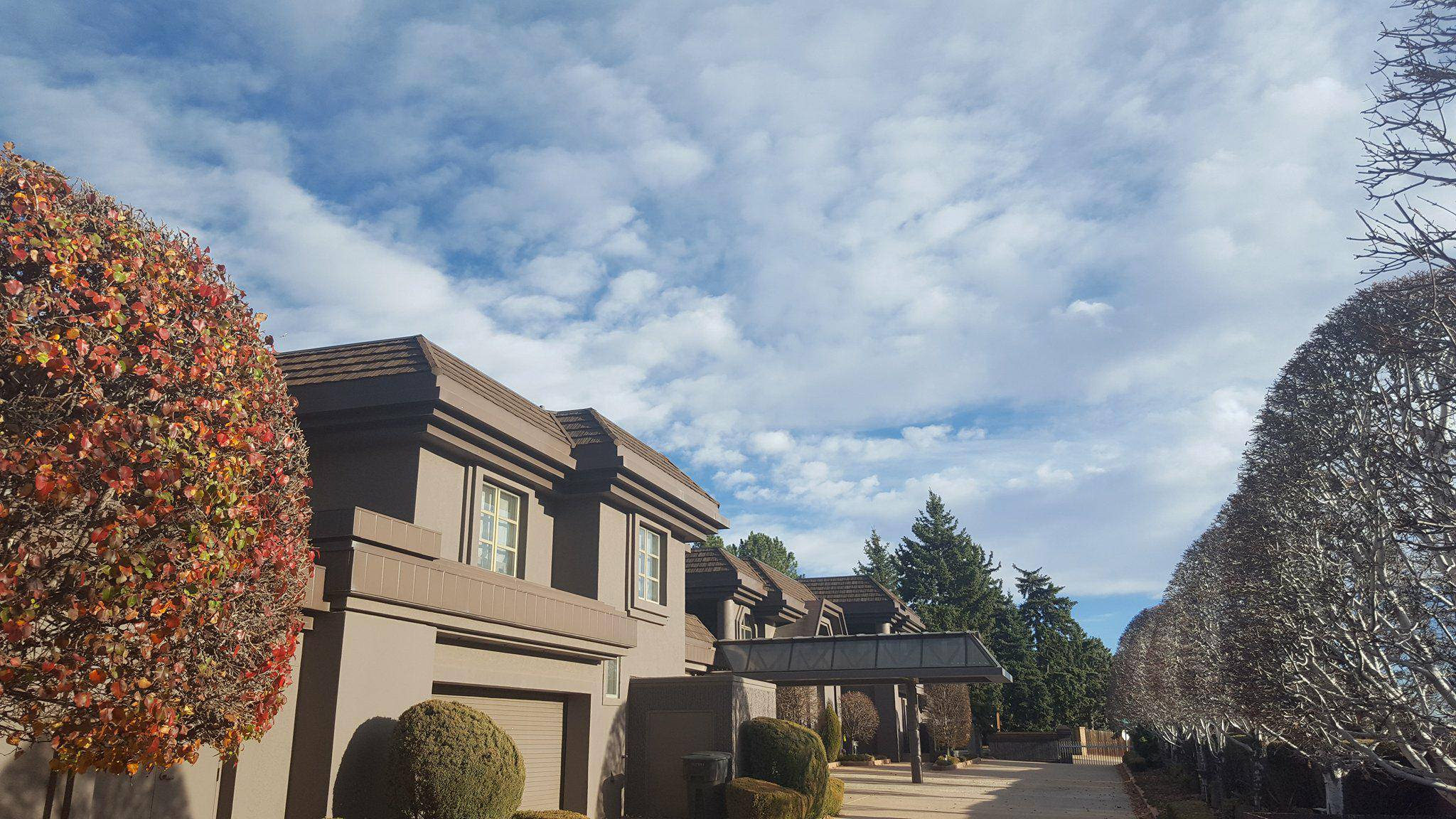
- Front view of Cableland near the entrance at the intersection of Shangri La Drive and Leetsdale Drive
- Interactive map of the Cableland area

General information
- Location: Shangri La Drive & Leetsdale Drive, Denver, Colorado, U.S.
- Coordinates: 39°42′49″N 104°56′19″W
- Current tenants: Mayor of Denver (official residence; unoccupied)
- Owner: City and County of Denver

Cableland is the official residence of the mayor of Denver, Colorado. To date, no Denver mayor has ever lived in the mansion. It is made available for use to certain non-profit organizations for special events and fundraising purposes.

It was donated, along with a $4 million endowment, to the City and County of Denver by cable television mogul Bill Daniels in 1998. He died in 2000.

The mansion originally had many unusual features such as a fire pole down the center of a spiral staircase leading to the master bedroom, elephant sculptures, and a pink piano. In 2012, the mansion received a major remodel to modernize the decor.

The mansion was built on land subdivided from the original grounds of the Shangri-La mansion built by Harry E. Huffman in 1937.
