= Columbia Mets =

Located in Columbia, South Carolina, the Columbia Mets were affiliated with the New York Mets from 1983 to 1992. A member of the South Atlantic League, they became the Capital City Bombers in 1993. They played in Capital City Stadium.

== Year by year record ==
Year	Record	Finish	Manager	Playoffs
1983	88-54	1st	John Tamargo	Lost League Finals
1984	82–57	1st	Rich Miller	
1985	79–57	2nd	Bud Harrelson / Rich Miller	Lost in 1st round
1986	90–42	1st	Tucker Ashford	League Champs
1987	64–75	10th	Butch Hobson	
1988	74–63	5th	Butch Hobson	
1989	73–67	4th	Bill Stein	
1990	83–60	1st	Bill Stein	Lost in 1st round
1991	86–54	2nd	Tim Blackwell	League Champs
1992	79–59	1st	Tim Blackwell	

== Notable alumni ==
- José Bautista (1984)
- Alberto Castillo (1990–1991)
- Brook Fordyce (1990)
- Bud Harrelson (1985, MGR) 2 x MLB All-Star
- Butch Hobson (1987–1988, MGR)
- Todd Hundley (1989) 2 x MLB All-Star
- Gregg Jeffries (1985–1986) 2 x MLB All-Star
- Bobby Jones (1991) MLB All-Star
- Manny Lee (1984)
- Dave Magadan (1983)
- Randy Myers (1983) 4 x MLB All-Star
- Pete Schourek (1989)
- Fernando Vina (1990) MLB All-Star
- David West (1986)
