= Bill Stein =

American baseball player (born 1947)

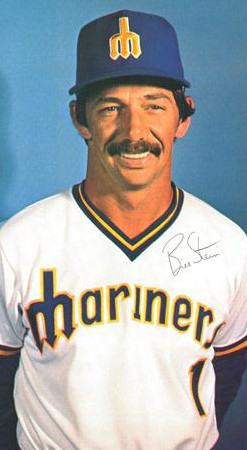
- Stein with the Seattle Mariners in 1978
- Third baseman / Second baseman
- Born: January 21, 1947 (age 79); Battle Creek, Michigan, U.S.
- Batted: Right Threw: Right

MLB debut
- September 6, 1972, for the St. Louis Cardinals

Last MLB appearance
- October 6, 1985, for the Texas Rangers

MLB statistics
- Batting average: .267
- Home runs: 44
- Runs batted in: 311
- Stats at Baseball Reference

Teams
- St. Louis Cardinals (1972–1973); Chicago White Sox (1974–1976); Seattle Mariners (1977–1980); Texas Rangers (1981–1985)

William Allen Stein (born January 21, 1947) is an American former professional baseball player and manager. His playing career spanned 17 seasons, 14 of which were spent in Major League Baseball (MLB) with the St. Louis Cardinals (1972–1973), Chicago White Sox (1974–1976), Seattle Mariners (1977–1980), and Texas Rangers (1981–1985). In the majors, Stein batted .267 with 122 doubles, 18 triples, 44 home runs, and 311 runs batted in (RBIs) in 959 games played. Stein played numerous fielding positions over his major league career, including third base, second base, first base, left field, right field, and shortstop. He also spent significant time as a pinch hitter. After his playing career, he coached and managed in the minors and independent baseball.

== Early life ==
Stein was born on January 21, 1947, in Battle Creek, Michigan. He attended Cocoa High School in Cocoa, Florida and Brevard Community College. The Baltimore Orioles drafted him in the 33^{rd} round of the 1968 MLB draft. Stein did not sign with the Orioles. He began attending Southern Illinois University in 1969. As a member of the school's baseball team, he batted .396 and was named an All-American by the American Baseball Coaches Association.

== Playing career ==
=== St. Louis Cardinals ===
The St. Louis Cardinals drafted Stein in the fourth round of the 1969 MLB draft. He began his professional baseball career that year in the Cardinals minor league organization. The Cardinals assigned him to the Tulsa Oilers, who were their Triple-A affiliates. With the Oilers, Stein batted .295 with 24 runs scored, 54 hits, 11 doubles, five triples, one home run, and 20 runs batted in (RBIs) in 62 games played. Defensively, Stein played 31 games at second base, 14 games at third base, and five games at shortstop. During the 1970 season, the Cardinals assigned Stein to the Double-A level to play with the Arkansas Travelers of the Texas League. In 114 games played that year, he batted .289 with 124 hits, 21 doubles, two triples, and eight home runs. In the field, Stein played second base and outfield. In 1971, Stein was promoted back to Triple-A. He spent the entire season with Tulsa, where he batted .272 with 50 runs scored, 106 hits, 106 hits, 22 doubles, four triples, eight home runs, and 67 RBIs in 103 games played. Stein pitched a game that season, after Tulsa's starting pitcher was ejected from the game after throwing the ball at the umpire. In six innings, he allowed eight hits, and three runs (all earned). He played the majority of the season in the outfield, but also spent limited time at third base, first base, and shortstop.

To start the 1972 season, Stein was a member of Triple-A Tulsa. With the Oilers that year, he batted .278 with 100 hits, 26 doubles, four triples, five home runs, and 36 RBIs in 103 games played. Stein was a September call-up for the Cardinals that year. He made his debut in Major League Baseball (MLB) on September 6 against the Philadelphia Phillies. He got his first hit in that game, a home run in the ninth inning. He played 14 games in the majors that year, batting .314 with two runs scored, 11 hits, one triple, two home runs, and three RBIs. Defensively in the majors, he was positioned at third base, left field, and right field.

During spring training in 1973, the Sarasota Herald-Tribune labeled Stein as the Cardinals candidate for pinch hitting off the bench. He made the Cardinals Opening Day roster that year. He made his season debut on April 6 as a pinch hitter, going hitless in one at-bat against the Pittsburgh Pirates. His first hit of the season came on April 17, against the Pirates. In August, Stein was sent down to the minor leagues, replaced in the majors by outfielder Héctor Cruz. In the minors, Stein played with Tulsa, where he batted .289 with 23 hits, two doubles, and one triple in 21 games played. While in the majors that season, Stein compiled a .218 batting average with four runs scored, 12 hits, two doubles, and two RBIs in 32 games played. On defense with the Cardinals, he played right field, left field, third base, and first base.

=== Chicago White Sox ===
On September 25, 1973, the Cardinals traded to the California Angels for Jerry DaVanon. California then traded Stein to the Chicago White Sox on April 3, 1974, before he made a regular season appearance in the Angels organization. In return, the White Sox sent Steve Blateric to California. Stein started the 1974 season in the White Sox minor league system with the Triple-A Iowa Oaks. In 135 games with Iowa, he batted .326 with 107 runs scored, 178 hits, 32 doubles, eight triples, 16 home runs, and 76 RBIs. Stein led the American Association in hits; was second in runs scored, plate appearances (594), at-bats (554), and doubles; and was tied for second in triples. He was called up by Chicago in September. Stein made his White Sox debut on September 13, against the Angels, getting no hits in four at-bats. His first hit of the season came the next day, against California. In the majors that year, Stein batted .276 with five runs scored, 12 hits, one double, and five RBIs in 13 games played.

Stein spent his first full season in the majors in 1975. His season debut came on April 16, against the Texas Rangers, where in one at-bat he went hitless. In June, Stein was named the starting third baseman after Bill Melton, who was Chicago's regular third baseman, was benched for poor hitting. Stein also played back-up for second baseman Jorge Orta over the season. On July 20, in the second game of a doubleheader against the Milwaukee Brewers, Stein hit his first career grand slam. On the season, Stein batted .270 with 23 runs scored, 61 hits, seven doubles, one triple, three home runs, and 21 RBIs in 76 games. In the field, he played 28 games at second base, 24 games at third base, and one game in left field. Stein also played 18 games that year at the designated hitter spot in the lineup.

Stein played his final season with the White Sox in 1976. On August 17, in the first game of a doubleheader against the Boston Red Sox, he hit a game-winning single in the ninth inning to score Pat Kelly. In August, United Press International noted that it was the first time in his major league career that Stein was getting a chance to start regularly. During the season, he compiled a .268 batting average with 32 runs scored, 105 hits, 15 doubles, two triples, four home runs, and 36 RBIs in 117 games played. Stein played 58 games at second base, 58 games at third base, one game at first base, one game in right field, and one game at shortstop. He was also the designated hitter in one game during that season.

=== Seattle Mariners ===
"The only thing Darrell Johnson, the Mariners manager told me is to work at third base [...] You get worn out if you just sit on the bench. I found it much easier to play every day."

— The Associated Press interviewing Stein in March 1977 on the subject of his new team, the Mariners.

Bill Stein

During the 1976 MLB expansion draft, the Seattle Mariners selected Stein with their third pick in the draft. Stein said he was "glad" that the Mariners drafted him, because he did not like playing at Comiskey Park, the White Sox home ballpark. He was profiled by the Associated Press during spring training in 1977 and was interviewed about his new team and his unique versatility in the field. Stein said that although he had played a wide variety of positions in the past, he hoped he would get a chance to be the Mariners starting third baseman. In a win against Boston on May 3, Stein hit two home runs in the same game. In June, Stein commented on how he liked starting every day at third base for the Mariners. The Mariners manager, Darrell Johnson, praised Stein for playing "good ball" with Seattle. On July 8, in a game against the Minnesota Twins, Stein had his second two-home run performance of the season. In early-September, Stein got hit in the shoulder by a baseball, which was later revealed to have caused a hairline fracture. With the Mariners that year, he batted .259 with 53 runs scored, 144 hits, 26 doubles, five triples, 13 home runs, and 67 RBIs in 151 games played. Defensively, the vast majority of his games (147) were played at third base, but he also played limited time at shortstop. He led the American League (AL) in putouts by a third baseman with 146. Stein was also fifth in the league in defensive games at third base.

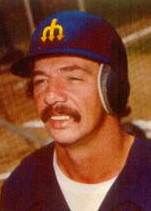
Stein, circa 1977

Before the start of the 1978 season, Stein re-signed with the Mariners. His contract meant he was now signed through the 1980 season. In May 1978, he bruised his left hand, which caused him to miss some playing time. On August 25, he broke up Dennis Martínez's potential no-hitter in the seventh inning of a game against Baltimore. On August 28, in a game against the Red Sox, Stein had a season-high four hits. On the season, he batted .261 with 41 runs scored, 105 hits, 24 doubles, four triples, four home runs, and 37 RBIs in 114 games played. In the field, Stein played 67 games at third base, 17 games at second base, and three games at shortstop. His 24 errors at third base was second in the AL.

Early into the 1979 season, Stein was placed on the disabled list after suffering a rib injury. Charlie Beamon Jr. was called up from the minor leagues to replace Stein. In late June, the Mariners activated Stein from the disabled list. By the time he had returned, the Mariners had already positioned Dan Meyer at his position, so Stein filled in at second base during his first game back. That year, Stein batted .248 with 28 runs scored, 62 hits, nine doubles, two triples, seven home runs, and 27 RBIs in 88 games played. As a fielder, he played 67 games at third base, 17 games at second base, and three games at shortstop.

1980 was Stein's final season with Seattle. On April 29, against the Twins, Stein had a season-high four hit game. He matched that high on July 26, against the Toronto Blue Jays. On July 28, Stein broke up a no-hit bid by Cleveland Indians pitcher Len Barker. Stein batted .268 with 16 runs scored, 53 hits, five doubles, one triple, five home runs, and 27 RBIs in 67 games played in 1980. Defensively, he played 34 games at third base, 14 games at second base, and eight games at first base. He also played five games that season as Seattle's designated hitter.

=== Texas Rangers ===
In December 1980, Stein was signed as a free agent by the Texas Rangers. He made his Rangers debut on April 14, 1981, against Cleveland. In that game, he batted 1-for-2. In May, Stein set an AL record by recording seven consecutive pinch hits. Through June, Stein had a .441 batting average. On the season, Stein batted .330 with 21 runs scored, 38 hits, six doubles, two home runs, and 22 RBIs in 53 games played. In the field, he played 20 games at first base, seven games at third base, seven games in left field, three games at second base, one game in right field, and one game at shortstop.

On April 16, 1982, in a game against Milwaukee, Stein hit a game-winning double in the top of the ninth inning. In June, while playing against his former team, the Mariners, Stein praised their pitching staff. In 85 games that year, Stein batted .239, the lowest average of his career since the 1972 season where he played with the St. Louis Cardinals. He also had 14 runs scored, 44 hits, eight doubles, one home run, and 16 RBIs. In the field, he played 34 games at second base, 28 games at third base, six games at shortstop, two games at first base, and one game in left field. Stein also was the designated hitter during three games.

In March 1983, Stein praised the Rangers new manager, Doug Rader, for working on the game in a "serious" way. On May 18, in a game against Cleveland, Stein got a game-winning pinch hit in the 14^{th} inning. With Texas that year, he batted .310 with 21 runs scored, 72 hits, 15 doubles, one triple, two home runs, and 33 RBIs in 78 games played. Stein played the majority of his games at second base but also played first base and third base. He was used as the Rangers designated hitter in six games. After the season, Stein spoke out against a transaction that the Rangers made, trading Jim Sundberg to Milwaukee, calling him a "mainstay of the organization".

In 1984, the Associated Press stated that Stein was one of the AL's best pinch hitters. Early in the season, he injured his wrist, which caused him to miss some playing time. In mid-June, the Rangers activated him from the disabled list. On the season, Stein batted .279 with three runs scored, 12 hits, one double and three RBIs in 27 games played. Stein played 11 games at second base, three games at first base, and three games at third base. He also spent four games as the Rangers designated hitter.

Before the 1985 season, it was announced that the Rangers had traded Stein to the Pittsburgh Pirates for a player to be named later, pending a physical. The Pirates later canceled the trade after team doctors discovered a "probable disc problem" in his back. Rumors then circulated that it was possible that Stein's career would be ended by the injury. However, Stein did play 44 games with the Rangers that season, batting .253 with five runs scored, 20 hits, three doubles, one triple, one home run, and 12 RBIs. He played 11 games at third base, eight games at first base, three games at second base, and three games in right field. Stein was the team's designated hitter in six games that year. In his final season in the majors, he earned a salary of $250,000 ($748,376 inflation adjusted). At the end of the season, Texas announced that it would not re-sign Stein. Through an agent, Stein commented that if he could not play for Texas in the upcoming season, he would retire.

== Coaching career ==
In 1987, Stein coached the Rockledge High School baseball team, leading them a district title with a 17–11 record. Stein was hired as the manager of the Class A-Short Season Little Falls Mets of the New York–Penn League in 1988, an affiliate of the New York Mets. In his first professional season as a manager, Stein led Little Falls to a 39–36 record. He said that when he became a manager it was difficult to learn pitching after all the years of being a position player. In 1989, the Mets fired Butch Hobson, the manager of the Single-A Columbia Mets, and promoted Stein to that position. At the helm of Colombia that year, Stein led them to a 73–67 record. He also served as a player-coach with the Orlando Juice of the Senior Professional Baseball Association in 1989.

Stein continued to manage Columbia in 1990, leading them to an 83–60 record. The Mets had the best record in the South Atlantic League that season. In 1991, Stein was hired to be the manager of the Bend Bucks of the Northwest League. The non-affiliated Bucks had a record of 30–46 with Stein as the manager. He was hired to be the manager of the Clinton Giants in 1992, a Single-A affiliate of the San Francisco Giants. Stein led Clinton to a 59–79 record that year. After considering taking a year off of baseball in 1994, Stein eventually accepted the managerial position with the independent league Tyler WildCatters.
