= Butch Hobson =

American baseball player and manager (born 1951)

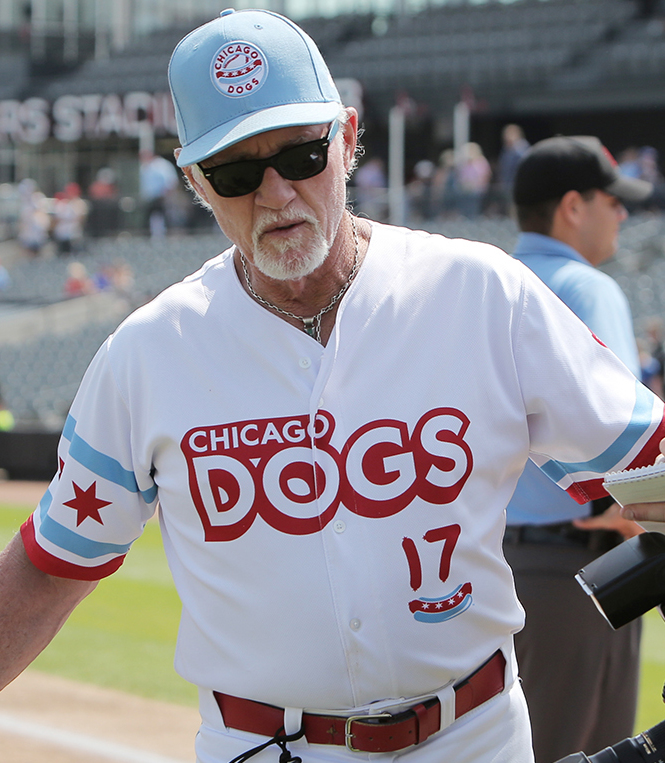
- Hobson as manager of the Chicago Dogs in 2019
- Third baseman / Manager
- Born: August 17, 1951 (age 74); Tuscaloosa, Alabama, U.S.
- Batted: Right Threw: Right

MLB debut
- September 7, 1975, for the Boston Red Sox

Last MLB appearance
- August 3, 1982, for the New York Yankees

MLB statistics
- Batting average: .248
- Home runs: 98
- Runs batted in: 397
- Managerial record: 207–232
- Winning %: .472
- Stats at Baseball Reference

Teams
- As player: Boston Red Sox (1975–1980); California Angels (1981); New York Yankees (1982); As manager: Boston Red Sox (1992–1994)

Clell Lavern "Butch" Hobson Jr. (born August 17, 1951) is an American professional baseball manager and former third baseman.

Hobson played in Major League Baseball (MLB) for the Boston Red Sox, California Angels, and New York Yankees, and managed for the Red Sox from 1992 to 1994. Listed at 6 feet 1 inch (1.85 m) and 193 pounds (88 kg), he batted and threw right-handed. Since retiring as an active player, he has managed several Minor League Baseball teams.

== Playing career ==
Hobson attended Bessemer City High School then University of Alabama, where he played both college football and college baseball. He was a backup quarterback for the Crimson Tide football team, under Bear Bryant, from 1969 through 1972. Hobson appeared in 11 games for Alabama, all during the 1971 season.

College football statistics
	Passing							Rushing			
YEAR	COMP	ATT	COMP%	YDS	TD	INT	RAT	ATT	YDS	AVG	TD
1971	2	8	25.0	29	0	1	30.5	25	154	6.2	2

Hobson was a standout player for the Crimson Tide baseball program, leading the team in 1973 with 38 hits, 13 home runs, and 37 RBIs in 36 games, along with being named a First Team All-SEC selection. He was named to Alabama's All-Century baseball team in 1993.

=== Boston Red Sox ===
Selected by the Boston Red Sox in the 1973 MLB draft, Hobson made his major league debut in 1975. His most productive season came in 1977, when he set team season records for a third baseman with 30 home runs and 112 RBIs. In 1978, Hobson hit 17 home runs with 80 RBIs. However, he posted 43 errors, the most for any American League player in that season, and his .899 fielding average also was the first below .900 by a regular player in 60 years. Hobson hit 28 home runs with 93 RBIs in 1979, but a year later, an injury to his right elbow landed him on the disabled list for major parts of that season and the next.

In parts of six seasons with the Red Sox, Hobson batted .252 with 94 home runs and 358 RBIs.

=== California Angels ===
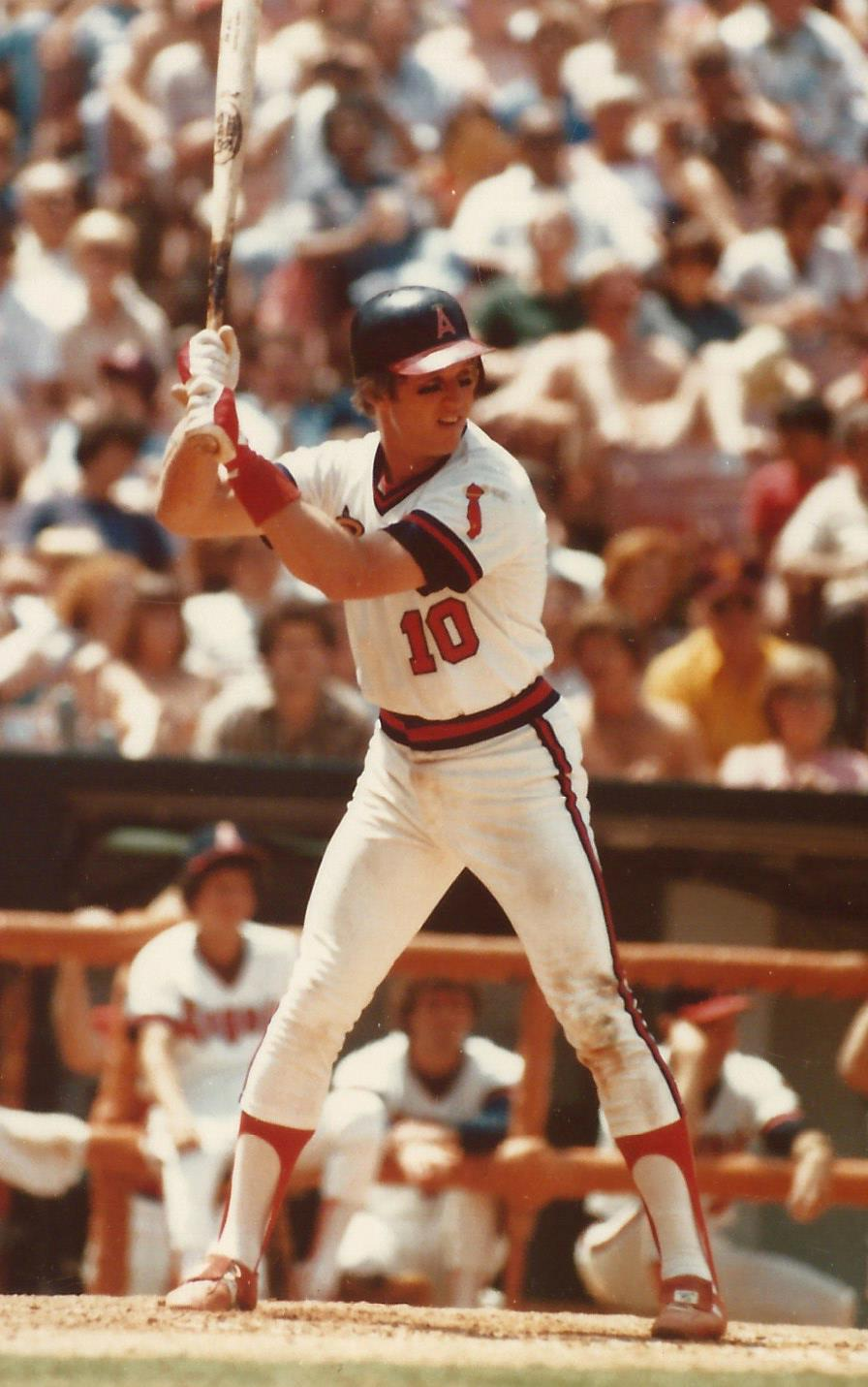
Hobson with the California Angels in 1981

Hobson was traded along with Rick Burleson from the Red Sox to the Angels for Carney Lansford, Rick Miller and Mark Clear on December 10, 1980. During the 1981 season, Hobson played 85 games with the Angels, batting .235 with 4 home runs and 36 RBIs.

=== New York Yankees ===
Hobson was dealt from the Angels to the Yankees for Bill Castro during spring training on March 24, 1982. He finished his major league career in 1982, appearing in 30 games while batting .172 with three RBIs. He played with the Yankees' Triple-A affiliate, the Columbus Clippers, through 1985.

=== Career totals ===
In an eight-year MLB career, Hobson had a .248 batting average with 98 home runs and 397 RBI in 738 games. He holds the MLB record for fewest career home runs by a player with a 30 home run season.

In September 2016, at age 65, Hobson had a single at bat for the Lancaster Barnstormers, an independent baseball league team that he was the manager of, so that he could appear in a professional baseball game with his son K. C. Hobson. He struck out swinging.

== Managerial career ==
Hobson first managed in the New York Mets farm system, leading the Class A Columbia Mets in 1987 and 1988.

Hobson next managed in Boston's minor league system, leading the Double-A New Britain Red Sox in 1989 and 1990. He then managed the Pawtucket Red Sox for the 1991 season and posted a 79–64 record to lead his team to a first-place finish in the International League, and was named the International League Manager of the Year. After losing the Governors' Cup to the Columbus Clippers, he was hired to manage the parent club in MLB. Hobson managed the Boston Red Sox from 1992 to 1994, posting an overall 207–232 record.

Hobson next managed the Mobile BaySharks in the independent Texas–Louisiana League for the 1995 season.

In May 1996, while managing the Scranton/Wilkes-Barre Red Barons, then a Triple-A affiliate of the Philadelphia Phillies, Hobson was arrested for possession of cocaine—he was placed on leave, and subsequently fired in August. His record during his brief stint with the Red Barons was 13–14.

After not managing during the 1997 and 1998 seasons, Hobson returned to managing in 1999, leading the Sarasota Red Sox.

Hobson managed the Nashua Pride for the 2000 through 2007 seasons with a record of 508–456. The team won the Atlantic League Championship in 2000, and the Can-Am League Championship in 2007. On rare occasions when an umpire ejected Hobson from a game for arguing a baserunning decision, Hobson would remove one of the bases and deliver it to a young fan before leaving the stadium. This signature move was one of the meanings of Stolen Bases, a movie the Pride commissioned in 2000. For example, Hobson "stole" first base on July 27, 2007, when a baserunner for the North Shore Spirit was called out at first base, then ruled safe after a protest by the opposing manager. The base was always retrieved, allowing the game to resume.

On November 19, 2007, Hobson was named the first-ever manager of the Southern Maryland Blue Crabs in the independent Atlantic League of Professional Baseball. He won manager of the year for the Atlantic League for the 2008 season, and led the team through the 2010 season.

On October 19, 2010, Hobson was named manager of the Lancaster Barnstormers of the Atlantic League; he managed the Barnstormers for the 2011 through 2016 seasons, winning the Atlantic League title in 2014.

On January 5, 2017, Hobson was named manager of the Class A Kane County Cougars of the Midwest League; He managed the Cougars during the 2017 season.

On March 19, 2018, Hobson was named the inaugural manager of the Chicago Dogs of the independent American Association of Independent Professional Baseball. He guided the Dogs for six seasons, before departing at the end of the 2023 season.

The 2023 season saw Hobson become the first-ever manager in modern (1993-present) independent baseball to win 1,500 games. He finished the 2023 season with a 1538-1325 (.537) record over 24 seasons in independent baseball, holding records for the most games and wins among Indy ball skippers.

=== Managerial record ===
Major League Baseball

Team	Year	Regular season					Postseason			
Team	Year	Games	Won	Lost	Win %	Finish	Won	Lost	Win %	Result
BOS	1992	162	73	89	.451	7th in AL East	–	–	–	–
BOS	1993	162	80	82	.494	5th in AL East	–	–	–	–
BOS	1994	115	54	61	.470	4th in AL East	–	–	–	–
Total		439	207	232	.472		0	0	–	

Minor League Baseball and Independent Baseball

Team	Level	Year	Regular season					Postseason			
Team	Level	Year	Games	Won	Lost	Win %	Finish	Won	Lost	Win %	Result
Columbia	A	1987	139	64	75	.460	6th in SAL South	–	–	–	–
Columbia	A	1988	137	74	63	.494	4th in SAL South	–	–	–	–
New Britain	AA	1989	136	60	76	.470	8th in EL	–	–	–	–
New Britain	AA	1990	139	72	67	.518	4th in EL	3	5	.375	Lost Eastern League Finals
Pawtucket	AAA	1991	143	79	64	.552	1st in IL North	0	3	.000	Lost Governors' Cup Finals
Mobile	Ind.	1995	99	40	59	.404	7th in T-LL	–	–	–	–
Scranton/Wilkes-Barre	AAA	1996	27	13	14	.481	fired	–	–	–	–
Sarasota	A+	1999	139	67	72	.482	6th in FSL	–	–	–	–
Nashua	Ind.	2000	141	82	58	.586	T-1st in AtL North	5	1	.867	Atlantic League Champions
Nashua	Ind.	2001	126	68	58	.540	2nd in AtL North	1	2	.333	Lost Division Finals
Nashua	Ind.	2002	126	54	71	.432	3rd in AtL North	–	–	–	–
Nashua	Ind.	2003	126	71	55	.563	2nd in AtL North	4	4	.500	Lost Atlantic League Finals
Nashua	Ind.	2004	126	65	61	.516	T-2nd in AtL North	0	2	.000	Lost Division Finals
Nashua	Ind.	2005	140	78	62	.557	1st in AtL North	2	3	.400	Lost Atlantic League Finals
Nashua	Ind.	2006	88	40	48	.455	7th in Can-Am	–	–	–	–
Nashua	Ind.	2007	93	50	43	.538	3rd in Can-Am	6	2	.750	Can-Am League Champions
Southern Maryland	Ind.	2008	140	74	66	.529	1st in AtL Liberty	–	–	–	–
Southern Maryland	Ind.	2009	140	79	61	.564	1st in AtL Liberty	4	5	.444	Lost Atlantic League Finals
Southern Maryland	Ind.	2010	139	82	57	.590	2nd in AtL Liberty	1	3	.250	Lost Division Finals
Lancaster	Ind.	2011	125	69	56	.552	2nd in AtL Freedom	2	3	.400	Lost Division Finals
Lancaster	Ind.	2012	140	88	52	.629	1st in AtL Freedom	5	3	.625	Lost Atlantic League Finals
Lancaster	Ind.	2013	139	72	67	.518	3rd in AtL Freedom	–	–	–	–
Lancaster	Ind.	2014	140	81	59	.579	1st in AtL Freedom	6	2	.750	Atlantic League Champions
Lancaster	Ind.	2015	140	75	65	.536	1st in AtL Freedom	1	3	.250	Lost Division Finals
Lancaster	Ind.	2016	140	67	73	.479	3rd in AtL Freedom	–	–	–	–
Kane County	A	2017	137	72	65	.526	3rd in MWL West	0	2	.000	Lost First Round
Chicago	Ind.	2018	99	45	54	.455	4th in AA North	–	–	–	–
Chicago	Ind.	2019	100	59	41	.590	3rd in AA North	–	–	–	–
Chicago	Ind.	2020	58	26	32	.448	6th in AA	–	–	–	–
Chicago	Ind.	2021	100	63	37	.630	1st in AA North	2	3	.400	Lost Division Finals
Chicago	Ind.	2022	100	54	46	.540	T-1st in AA North	1	2	.333	Lost First Round
Chicago	Ind.	2023	100	56	44	.560	T-1st in AA North	5	5	.500	Lost Miles Wolff Cup Finals
Total (Minor League Baseball)			997	501	496	.503		3	8	.273	2 Playoff Appearances
Total (Independent Baseball)			2865	1538	1325	.537		45	43	.511	16 Playoff Appearances 3 League Championships
Total (All Minor Leagues)			3862	2039	1821	.528		48	51	.484	18 Playoff Appearances 3 League Championships

== Personal life ==
Following his May 1996 arrest in Rhode Island for cocaine possession, Hobson faced up to three years in jail and a $5,000 fine. He pleaded innocent, and in December 1996 was placed in a diversion program for first-time offenders after acknowledging past use of the drug.

Hobson's son K. C. played baseball for Stockdale High School where the elder Hobson was an assistant baseball coach in 2008 and 2009, helping the Mustangs win two CIF section championships. Later, K. C. was selected by the Toronto Blue Jays in the sixth round of the 2009 MLB draft. He played in Minor League Baseball for Toronto and San Francisco Giants organizations as a first baseman, reaching the Double-A level. He most recently played in 2022 for the independent American Association Chicago Dogs managed by Butch Hobson.

== Sources ==
- The ESPN Baseball Encyclopedia – Gary Gillette, Peter Gammons, Pete Palmer. Publisher: Sterling Publishing, 2005. Format: Paperback, 1824pp. Language: English. ISBN 1-4027-4771-3

Sporting positions
Preceded by Tucker Ashford	Columbia Mets Manager; 1987–1988	Succeeded by Bill Stein
Preceded by Dave Holt	New Britain Red Sox Manager; 1989–1990	Succeeded by Gary Allenson
Preceded by Johnny Pesky	Pawtucket Red Sox Manager; 1991	Succeeded by Rico Petrocelli
Preceded by Mike Quade	Scranton/Wilkes-Barre Red Barons Manager; 1996	Succeeded by Ramon Aviles
Preceded by Bob Geren	Sarasota Red Sox Manager; 1999	Succeeded by Ron Johnson
