= Steve Blateric =

American baseball player (born 1944)

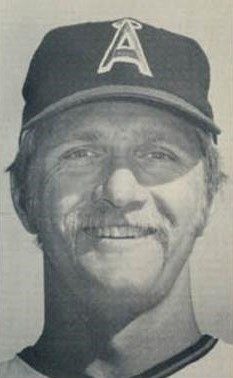
- Pitcher
- Born: March 20, 1944 (age 82); Denver, Colorado, U.S.
- Batted: Right Threw: Right

MLB debut
- September 17, 1971, for the Cincinnati Reds

Last MLB appearance
- April 21, 1975, for the California Angels

MLB statistics
- Win–loss record: 0–0
- Earned run average: 5.73
- Strikeouts: 13
- Stats at Baseball Reference

Teams
- Cincinnati Reds (1971); New York Yankees (1972); California Angels (1975)

Stephen Lawrence Blateric (born March 20, 1944) is a retired professional baseball player who played three seasons for the Cincinnati Reds, New York Yankees, and California Angels of Major League Baseball. He was later the head coach at Sonoma State from 1980-1985.

Blateric attended Lincoln High School and played college baseball at the University of Denver. He was signed as an undrafted free agent by the Boston Red Sox in 1966.

== Professional career ==
Blateric pitched 11 career innings in the Major Leagues. He finished his career with 13 strikeouts and a 5.73 earned run average. On September 16, 1972, he was sent to the New York Yankees by the Cincinnati Reds for future considerations. On March 3, 1973, he was returned to the Reds. On December 12, he was traded to the Cleveland Indians in exchange for Roger Freed. On May 22, 1974, he was traded to the Chicago White Sox in exchange for Johnny Jeter. On August 1, he was traded to the California Angels completing a trade in which the White Sox traded cash and a player to be named later to the Angels in exchange for Bill Stein on April 3.

== Coaching career ==
In 1980, Blateric became the head coach of Sonoma State University. He spent six seasons with the Seawolves.

== Head coaching record ==
Below is a table of Blateric's yearly records as an NCAA Division II head baseball coach.

Record table
Season	Team	Overall	Conference	Standing	Postseason
Sonoma State Seawolves ((Division II)) (1980–1985)
1980	Sonoma State	14–32	n/a		
1981	Sonoma State	5–31	n/a		
1982	Sonoma State	9–32	n/a		
1983	Sonoma State	6–31	5–23	6th	
1984	Sonoma State	15–33–1	12–24	6th	
1985	Sonoma State	7-42	3–27	6th	
Sonoma State:		56–201–1	20–74		
Total:		56–201–1			
National champion Postseason invitational champion Conference regular season champion Conference regular season and conference tournament champion Division regular season champion Division regular season and conference tournament champion Conference tournament champion
