= Abraham Lincoln High School (Colorado) =

Coordinates: 39°40′33.88″N 105°1′37.36″W

Location
- 2285 South Federal Blvd. Denver, Colorado 80219; United States

Information
- Type: Public
- Motto: Simply The Best
- Established: 1959 (67 years ago)
- School district: Denver Public Schools
- CEEB code: 060367
- Principal: Antonio Esquibel
- Staff: 4
- Teaching staff: 66.76 (FTE)
- Grades: 9-12
- Enrollment: 992 (2023-2024)
- Student to teacher ratio: 14.86
- Campus type: Urban
- Colors: Navy blue and grey
- Athletics: 3A
- Mascot: Lancers
- Website: alhs.dpsk12.org

Abraham Lincoln High School is a public high school, founded in 1959, in Denver, Colorado, United States, and is named after former President Abraham Lincoln.

The school's colors are blue and grey, representing the colors worn by the soldiers during the US Civil War; blue represents the North, and grey represents the South. The original shade used in the school's colors was royal blue, distinguishing it from Manual High School's Carolina blue & John F. Kennedy's navy blue in the Denver Public School District. The blue was transitioned from royal to navy beginning in the late 1990s. Some instances can be seen where silver replaces grey.

The school's mascot is a Lancer, which is a jousting knight holding a pole arm/lance.

Abraham Lincoln High School's traditional rival high school is John F. Kennedy High School, although rivalries have also existed with West High School and North High School.

Both Abraham Lincoln High School and John F. Kennedy High School have nearly exact original architecture.

As of the 2020–2021 school year ALHS currently has 964 students.

The principal is Antonio Esquibel, who returned to the job after his initial tenure from 2006 to 2011.

Abraham Lincoln High School is located in the Harvey Park neighborhood on the southwest side of Denver.

== Demographics ==
- 89.9% Latino
- 3.3% African American
- 2.9% Caucasian
- 2.7% Asian
- 0.7% American Indian
- 0.4% Two or More Races

Grade Level

- 38.8% Freshman 9th grade
- 22.3% Sophomore 10th grade
- 18.4% Junior 11th grade
- 20.5% Senior 12th grade

Gender

- 54.8% Male
- 45.2% Female

Using federal government guidelines, 87% of the students were eligible for free or reduced-price lunches.

== Academics ==
The school offers coursework intended to prepare students for college and careers, including 43 concurrent enrollment options, three Advanced Placement (AP) courses, and five Career and Technical Education (CTE) pathways. Students can also pursue a Spanish minor through Metropolitan State University of Denver and earn up to 12 college credits through concurrent enrollment as part of the DPS College First program. We are a Transitional Native Language Instruction (TNLI) school that serves English Language Learners (ELL). We hold all our ELL students to the same standards towards college readiness as our native English speakers.

== Improvement ==
Abraham Lincoln High School was one of 16 schools nationwide (one of four in Denver) selected by the College Board for inclusion in the EXCELerator School Improvement Model program beginning the 2007–2008 school year. EXCELerator includes a college prep curriculum designed to help students focus and succeed in college. The project was funded by the Bill & Melinda Gates Foundation.

Lincoln closely follows the SIOP (Sheltered Instructional Observation Protocol) model, has an JROTC program, and is part of the new Denver Scholarship Foundation, begun by Lincoln alum Tim Marquez, class of 1976.

The Denver Scholarship Foundation is a newly created partnership between community leaders, private donors, the City of Denver and Denver Public Schools. The foundation's mission is to provide post-secondary advising while a student attends Abraham Lincoln High School and financial assistance through a scholarship program for students who are admitted to one of 33 institutions in Colorado.

== Sporting awards ==
On Saturday, March 10, 2007, the Lincoln Lancers boys' basketball team won the class 4A Colorado state championship. Lincoln defeated the Ralston Valley Mustangs by a score of 63–52. This was Lincoln's first state title since a cross country win in 1968. They went back-to-back in 2008 to win their second consecutive 4A Colorado state championship. The men's soccer team were state runner-up in 2009.

State championships:

- Basketball (2007, 4A)
- Basketball (2008, 4A)
- Cross country (1960, I)
- Cross country (1961, I)
- Cross country (1962, I)
- Cross country (1968, I)
- Gymnastics (1961)
- Gymnastics (1962)

== Notable alumni ==
- Steve Blateric, former MLB player (Cincinnati Reds, New York Yankees, California Angels)
- Nick Capra, former MLB player (Texas Rangers, Kansas City Royals)
- Jorge Gutierrez, current LNBP player (Astros de Jalisco)
- Hector Hernandez, former Mexican basketball player and Mexico National Team Member.

== Notable faculty ==
- Arlene Hirschfeld, English teacher.

== See also ==
- Denver Public Schools
