= Young Americans Bank =

American bank serving customers under age 22

Young Americans Center for Financial Education
- Company type: Private company
- Industry: Financial services, Education
- Founded: 1987; 39 years ago in Denver, Colorado
- Headquarters: Denver, Colorado, United States
- Key people: Lang Sias, President and CEO, Bill Daniels, Founder
- Services: Banking services, education
- Number of employees: 44 (2009)
- Parent: Young Americans Center for Financial Education
- Website: www.yacenter.org

The Young Americans Bank (YAB) is an American bank specifically set up for young people under the age of 22. Although designed to teach children and young people how to manage money, Young Americans Bank is a full for-profit, Federal Deposit Insurance Corporation-insured financial institution. As a full service bank, YAB offers, among other financial products, savings accounts, loans, checking accounts, certificates of deposit (CDs), and credit card accounts.

== History ==
Young Americans was set up in 1987 by Bill Daniels, an American cable television executive, after a group of elementary students in Denver, Colorado were denied a loan from other banks for a school project.

Young Americans Bank is housed under Young Americans Center for Financial Education, a 501(c)3 non-profit that organizes programs such as Young AmeriTowne, International Towne, Get a Head for Business, and summer camps.
