= Bill Daniels =

American cable TV executive and sports team owner (1920–2000)

- Born: Robert William Daniels, Jr. July 1, 1920; Greeley, Colorado, U.S.
- Died: March 7, 2000 (aged 79); Rancho Mirage, California, U.S.
- Education: New Mexico Military Institute
- Occupations: Cable television executive, sports owner

Robert William Daniels Jr. (July 1, 1920 – March 7, 2000) was an American cable television executive and owner of professional sports teams. He was a pioneer in building the cable television industry and was known as the "father of cable television." Having an interest in sports, he co-founded the Prime Ticket sports network and was a co-owner of the Los Angeles Lakers and was a founder of the United States Football League as the owner of the Los Angeles Express. He also owned the Utah Stars of the American Basketball Association.

== Early life ==
Daniels was born in Greeley, Colorado and shortly thereafter moved to Hobbs, New Mexico. There he was enrolled at the New Mexico Military Institute (NMMI) in Roswell, New Mexico. In 1941 he won the New Mexico State Golden Gloves Championships (later in 1969, he financed an amateur boxing team called the Denver Rocks, and supported the International Boxing League.) In 1941, he joined the Navy and became an accomplished fighter pilot both in World War II and the Korean War, retiring with the rank of commander. Not long after the war, on his way home he happened upon a bar in Denver that was showing a boxing match from out-of-state, and he became interested in the technology that brought television over long distances.

== Founding an industry ==
Daniels took a chance on this long-distance television market by setting up a microwave feed that delivered Denver programming to Casper, Wyoming in 1952. It was the first broadcast signal sent by microwave feed. His television feed had only one channel and polled his viewers every 90 days on what they preferred to watch.

He later shifted his focus towards brokering and investment banking for the growing industry. In 1958, he founded Daniels and Associates to specialize in this field. By 1965 his company, Daniels and Associates had brokered in excess of $100 million and this represented about 80 percent of the year's transactions. Daniels owned cable systems as well, with 31 cable systems in 10 states by 1986. When selling his cable systems, he often distributed a portion of the sale proceeds to his employees. One such sale of a system in Alaska resulted in $8 million in payouts to Daniels employees. With Lakers co-owner Jerry Buss, Daniels started the Prime Ticket sports programming network in 1985, which he sold in 1994, sharing $12 million with his employees. In 1990, he sold 49% of Daniels & Associates to company executives.

Daniels died in 2000, and in 2006 Royal Bank of Canada acquired Daniels & Associates, renaming it RBC Daniels.

== Sports ==
A lifelong passionate fan for sports of all sorts, Daniels supported the Denver Grand Prix , was a co-owner of the Los Angeles Lakers, and owner of the American Basketball Association's Utah Stars franchise, and a founder of the Los Angeles Express in the United States Football League. Daniels sponsored the USAC Championship Car campaigns of Texan Lloyd Ruby both in 1970 under the Daniels' Cablevision banner and in 1971 while promoting Daniels's Utah Stars franchise and backed boxer Ron Lyle in a championship fight against Muhammad Ali.

He acquired the Los Angeles Stars in 1970 for about $850,000 and moved it to Utah. The Stars proved to be successful on the court, winning the ABA championship in the 1970–71 season, but unsuccessful financially, losing $400,000 that season. In total Daniels estimated that he lost $3.1 million operating the team. In December 1975, 16 games into the season, Daniels announced that the team could not pay the players, who included future Hall of Famer Moses Malone. He initially tried to sell the team in 1974 to focus on his campaign for Governor of Colorado. Later, he tried to merge the team with the Spirits of St. Louis, but that team received enough support from the city that it did not go through with the merger. The league ultimately folded the team and dispersed its players. The bankruptcy left season ticketholders without a team or a refund on their tickets. In 1980, he made amends, by paying out a total of $750,000 to 3,000 former season ticketholders which included their ticket price plus interest.

He was one of the few owners to make money in the USFL. After the teams began signing increasingly lucrative player contracts, Daniels elected to sell his team to J. William Oldenburg for $8 million.

== Politics ==
Daniels became active in politics, winning a seat as a National Committeeman from Colorado for the Republican National Committee and running for the Republican nomination for Governor of Colorado in 1974. Daniels faced incumbent Governor John Vanderhoof in the primary election and was defeated in a 60% to 40% landslide. Vanderhoof would subsequently be defeated in the general election by a 53% to 46% margin against Democrat Richard Lamm.

He remained active in the Republican Party, donating more than $100,000 to the party in 1988. He also provided a job in the cable industry to Neil Bush, a son of Vice President George H. W. Bush after Neil's company, Silverado Savings and Loan, failed in the savings and loan crisis.

== Later life ==
In 1987, Daniels founded the Young Americans Bank, a special bank with a unique Federal Deposit Insurance Corporation-insured state charter. The bank caters only to patrons under the age of 22 and teaches young people about banking and related financial matters.

In 1998, he founded Prime Ventures, which owned six cable networks and added Prime Networks, a sports channel for his cable systems.

== Personal life ==
Daniels was married four times and had two stepsons but no children of his own. His brother Jack was a member of the New Mexico House of Representatives and ran for Governor of New Mexico and United States Senator from New Mexico. His niece Diane Denish was elected as the 28th Lieutenant Governor of New Mexico in 2002 and later became a board member of the Daniels Fund.

Daniels died on March 7, 2000, at his home in Rancho Mirage, California, after a long illness. In his will, he donated his mansion, Cableland, to the city of Denver for use as the official residence of the Mayor of Denver. As of 2010, no mayor had used the home. It is primarily rented for events and the city has considered selling the property to raise money.

== Philanthropy ==
Daniels had problems at times with alcohol and both patronized and supported the Betty Ford Center and helped found Cenikor Foundation, a rehabilitation center in Colorado. With his private Learjet 35, he sponsored a successful challenge to the world speed record which raised money for Junior Achievement. While attending a college graduation, he asked a graduate about the business ethics coursework, only to be told that for that school there were no ethics studies as a part of the business school program. This, in turn, led to Daniels's eventual endowment of what became the Daniels College of Business at the University of Denver, as they shared a like-minded vision and included ethics studies in their program. He donated $22 million to the school over a period of years. Daniels decided to use his fortune to continue helping others by forming a foundation that supports issues relating to aging, alcoholism and substance abuse, amateur sports, disabilities, education (early childhood, K-12 reform, and ethics and integrity), the homelessness and disadvantaged, and youth development. This foundation, the Daniels Fund, received over $1 billion from the Daniels estate making it one of the largest private foundations in the United States.
