= Lost Horizon (1937 film) =

1937 film by Frank Capra

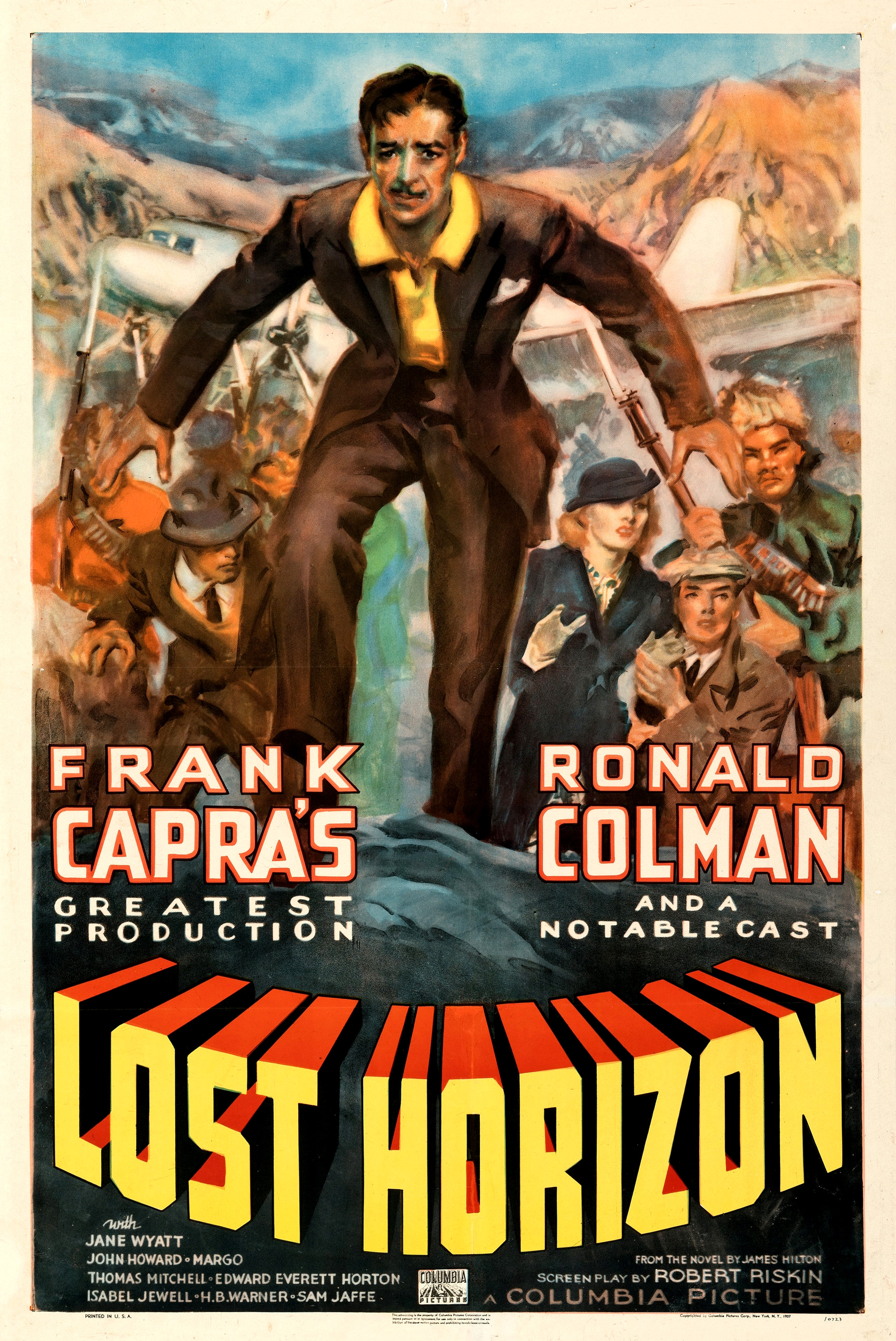
- Theatrical release poster by James Montgomery Flagg
- Directed by: Frank Capra
- Screenplay by: Robert Riskin
- Based on: Lost Horizon; 1933 novel by James Hilton
- Produced by: Frank Capra
- Starring: Ronald Colman; Jane Wyatt; Edward Everett Horton; John Howard; Thomas Mitchell; Margo; Isabel Jewell; Sam Jaffe
- Cinematography: Joseph Walker; Elmer Dyer
- Edited by: Gene Havlick; Gene Milford
- Music by: Dimitri Tiomkin
- Color process: Black and white
- Production company: Columbia Pictures
- Distributed by: Columbia Pictures
- Release dates: March 2, 1937 (San Francisco, premiere)
- Running time: 132 minutes
- Country: United States
- Language: English
- Budget: $2 million
- Box office: $3.5 million (U.S. and Canada rentals)

Lost Horizon (re-released in 1942 as The Lost Horizon of Shangri-La) is a 1937 American adventure drama fantasy film directed by Frank Capra. The screenplay by Robert Riskin is based on the 1933 novel of the same name by James Hilton.

The film exceeded its original budget by more than $776,000 and took five years to earn back its cost. The serious financial crisis it created for Columbia Pictures damaged the partnership between Capra and studio head Harry Cohn as well as the friendship between Capra and Riskin.

In 2016, the film was selected for preservation in the United States National Film Registry by the Library of Congress as being "culturally, historically, or aesthetically significant."

== Plot ==
On March 10, 1935, a revolutionary uprising drives terrified Westerners to the airport in the fictional city of Baskul, in Western China. The evacuation is organized by writer, soldier, and diplomat Robert Conway, before he is to return to the United Kingdom and become Foreign Secretary. He flies out with the last four evacuees: paleontologist Alexander Lovett; notorious swindler Henry Barnard; bitter, terminally ill Gloria Stone; and Conway's younger brother George. However, their pilot is forcibly replaced and their aircraft hijacked. It eventually runs out of fuel and crashes deep in the Himalayas of Tibet, killing their abductor.

The group is rescued by Chang and his men and taken to Shangri-La, an idyllic valley sheltered from the bitter cold. The contented inhabitants are led by the mysterious High Lama. Initially anxious to return to civilization, most of the newcomers grow to love Shangri-La, including Gloria, who miraculously seems to be recovering from her illness. Conway is particularly enchanted, especially when he meets Sondra, a French teacher who has grown up in Shangri-La. However, George and Maria, another young woman living there, are determined to leave.

Conway eventually has an audience with the High Lama, who he learns is a European Catholic priest, Father Perrault, who arrived in the area many years before. The founder of Shangri-La is said to be two hundred years old, preserved, like the other residents, by the magical properties of the paradise he has created, but is finally dying and needs someone wise in the ways of the modern world to keep it safe. Having read Conway's writings, Sondra believed he is the one; the Lama agreed with her and arranged for Conway's abduction. The old man names Conway his successor and then peacefully passes away.

George refuses to believe the Lama's fantastic story, and that Maria is much older than the 20 she claims to be. Chang says Maria was brought to Shangri-La in 1888 by an abduction and was 20 at the time, which would make her 66 or 67. (Sondra claims to be 30.) Uncertain and torn between love and loyalty, Conway reluctantly agrees to accompany George and Maria with a group of porters returning to their homes. The porters gradually leave the trio behind, even shooting at them for their amusement. However, the shots trigger an avalanche that buries the porters.

After grueling travel, Maria collapses in the snow. Conway picks her up and carries her to the shelter of a cave. There they see she has died, her withered face revealing her true age. George loses his sanity and jumps to his death. Conway continues on, finally collapsing. He is found and taken to a Chinese Catholic mission, where a search party sent from Britain meets him. The ordeal has caused him to lose his memory of Shangri-La.

On the long voyage back to the United Kingdom, he remembers everything; he tells his story and then jumps ship in Singapore. Searchers pursue him back to the Himalayas, but are unable to follow him any further. In the final scene, he reaches the pass leading to Shangri-La.

== Cast ==
- Ronald Colman as Robert Conway
- Jane Wyatt as Sondra
- Edward Everett Horton as Lovett
- John Howard as George Conway
- Thomas Mitchell as Barnard
- Margo as Maria
- Isabel Jewell as Gloria
- H. B. Warner as Chang
- Sam Jaffe as High Lama

Uncredited

- Hugh Buckler as Lord Gainsford
- Sonny Bupp as boy being carried to plane
- Willie Fung as bandit leader at fuel stop-over
- Noble Johnson as leader of porters on return journey
- Richard Loo as Shanghai airport official
- Margaret McWade as missionary
- Leonard Mudie as Foreign Secretary
- David Torrence as Prime Minister
- Victor Wong as bandit leader
- Chief John Big Tree as porter

== Production ==
Frank Capra had read the James Hilton novel while filming It Happened One Night, and he intended to make Lost Horizon his next project. When Ronald Colman, his first and only choice for the role of Robert Conway, proved to be unavailable, Capra decided to wait and made Mr. Deeds Goes to Town instead.

=== Budget and casting ===
Harry Cohn authorized a budget of $1.25 million for the film, the largest amount ever allocated to a project up to that time. According to a 1986 Variety interview with Frank Capra Jr., his father had wanted to shoot the film in color, but because the only suitable stock footage he intended to incorporate into the film, such as scenes from a documentary about the Himalayas, was in black and white, he was forced to change his plans. In 1985, Capra Sr. said the decision to film in black and white was made because three-strip Technicolor was new and fairly expensive, and the studio was unwilling to increase the film's budget so he could utilize it.

An often repeated story concerns casting the part of the High Lama. After a screen test of 56-year-old retired stage actor A. E. Anson, Capra decided that he was just right for the part. He made a call to the actor's home, and the housekeeper who answered the phone was told to relay the message to Anson that the part was his. Not long after, the housekeeper called back telling Capra that when Anson heard the news, he had a heart attack and died. Subsequently, Capra offered the part to 58-year-old Henry B. Walthall. He died before shooting began. Finally, to play it safer age-wise, Capra cast Sam Jaffe, who was just 45. This is disputed, however, by camera logs dating back to the production that indicate Anson never tested for the part. Film historian Kendall Miller surmises that this story originated as an effort to add drama to Jaffe's casting.

=== Filming ===
Filming took 100 days and nights. From the beginning, Capra ran into difficulties that resulted in serious cost overruns. Principal photography began on March 23, 1936, and by the time it was completed on July 17, the director had spent $1.6 million. Contributing to the added expenses was the filming of snow scenes and aircraft interiors at the Los Angeles Ice and Cold Storage Warehouse, where the low temperature affected the equipment and caused lengthy delays. The Streamline Moderne sets representing Shangri-La, designed by Stephen Goosson, had been constructed adjacent to Hollywood Way, a busy thoroughfare by day, which necessitated filming at night and heavily added to overtime expenses. Many exteriors were filmed on location in Palm Springs, Lucerne Valley, the Ojai Valley, the Mojave Desert, the Sierra Nevada Mountains, and in what is now Westlake Village, adding the cost of transporting cast, crew, and equipment to the swelling budget.

Capra also used multiple cameras to cover every scene from several angles, and by the time shooting ended, he had used 1.1 million feet of film. For one scene lasting four minutes, he shot 6,000 feet, the equivalent of one hour of screen time. He spent six days filming Sam Jaffe performing the High Lama's monologues, then reshot the scenes twice, once with Walter Connolly, because it was felt Jaffe's makeup was unconvincing and he looked too young for the role. A total of 40 minutes of footage featuring the High Lama eventually was trimmed to the 12 that appeared in the final cut. Filming took one hundred days, 34 more than scheduled. The film's final cost, including prints and promotional advertising, was $2,626,620, and it did not make a profit until it was reissued in 1942.

The first cut of the film was six hours long. The studio considered releasing it in two parts, but eventually decided the idea was impractical. Working with editors Gene Havlick and Gene Milford, Capra managed to trim the running time to 3½ hours for the first preview in Santa Barbara on November 22, 1936. Following a showing of the screwball comedy Theodora Goes Wild, the audience was not receptive to a drama of epic length. Many walked out, and those who remained laughed at sequences intended to be serious. The feedback was mostly negative, and Capra was so distraught, he fled to Lake Arrowhead and remained in seclusion there for several days. He later claimed he burned the first two reels of the film, an account disputed by Milford, who noted setting the nitrate film on fire would have created a devastating explosion.

=== Editing ===
Following the disastrous preview, Capra made extensive cuts, and on January 12, 1937, reshot scenes involving the High Lama written by Sidney Buchman, who declined screen credit for his work. The new footage placed more emphasis on the growing desperation of the world situation at the time. A world premiere was held at the Lincoln Theater in Miami Beach, Florida on February 18, 1937.

Still unhappy with the film's length, Harry Cohn intervened and edited the film personally. When the edited version premiered in San Francisco on March 2, it was 132 minutes long. During the film's initial release in selected cities, it was a roadshow attraction, with only two presentations per day and tickets sold on a reserved-seat basis. Because the box-office returns were so low, the studio head cut an additional 14 minutes to slightly less than two hours (118 minutes) before the film went into general release on September 1. Due primarily to the cuts made without his approval, Capra later filed a lawsuit against Columbia, citing "contractual disagreements", among them, the studio's refusal to pay him a $100,000 semi-annual salary payment due him. A settlement was reached on November 27, 1937, with Capra collecting his money and being relieved of the obligation of making one of the five films required by his contract. In 1985, Capra claimed that Cohn, whom he described as the "Jewish producer," trimmed the film simply so theaters could have more daily showings and increase the film's chance of turning a profit.

== Release ==
Lost Horizon earned $3.5 million in U.S. and Canada rentals.

=== Later reissues and remakes ===
In 1942, the film was re-released as The Lost Horizon of Shangri-La. A lengthy drunken speech delivered by Robert Conway, in which he cynically mocks war and diplomacy, had already been deleted in the general release version. Capra felt the film made no sense without the scene, and in later years film critic Leslie Halliwell described the missing 12 minutes as "vital". They were restored years later.

In 1952, a 92-minute version of the film was released. It aimed to play down features of the utopia that suggested communist ideals, a sensitive point after a civil war in China resulted in the ascension of Mao Zedong's Communist Party in that country in 1949.

In 1973, the AFI initiated a restoration of the film. The project was undertaken by the UCLA Film and Television Archive (under the supervision of Robert Gitt) and Columbia Pictures and took 13 years to complete. Although all 132 minutes of the original soundtrack were recovered, only 125 minutes of film could be found, so the seven minutes of missing film footage were replaced with a combination of publicity photos of the actors in costume taken during filming and still frames depicting the missing scenes.

Also in 1973, Columbia Pictures produced a modernized musical remake directed by Charles Jarrott and starring Peter Finch and Liv Ullmann. The film featured a score by Burt Bacharach and Hal David. It was both a critical and financial disaster. It came at the end of an era of expensive musical films ushered in by the huge success, in turn, of Mary Poppins, My Fair Lady, and The Sound of Music.

=== Restoration and home media ===
Lost Horizon suffered various losses to its original running time over the years:

- March 1937 premiere version: 132 minutes
- September 1937 general release version: 118 minutes
- 1942 re-release: 110 minutes
- 1948 re-release: restored to 118 minutes
- 1952 television version: 95 minutes — the only version in circulation for several decades.
- 1986 photochemical restoration: 132 minutes — 125 minutes of footage synchronised to complete premiere version soundtrack; film freeze frames and on-set publicity photos fill in the blank sections.
- 1998 digital restoration: 132 minutes — further work was carried out on the 1986 restoration.
- 2016 all-new 4K digital restoration: 132 minutes – 126 minutes of footage synchronised to premiere soundtrack, after an extra minute of missing film was discovered.

All three restorations have been released or licensed numerous times worldwide on home video by Sony and its predecessor, Columbia Pictures. The 1986 restoration was released on VHS and LaserDisc, while the 1998 restoration was issued on DVD. The 2016 restoration has been released on streaming; and on Blu-ray in various territories including Australia, the United States and much of Europe. In 2024, it was additionally released on Ultra HD Blu-ray in the US as part of the "Frank Capra at Columbia" box set.

== Reception ==
On review-aggregation website Rotten Tomatoes, Lost Horizon has an approval rating of 92% based on 13 reviews, with an average rating of 7.6/10.

=== Critical response ===
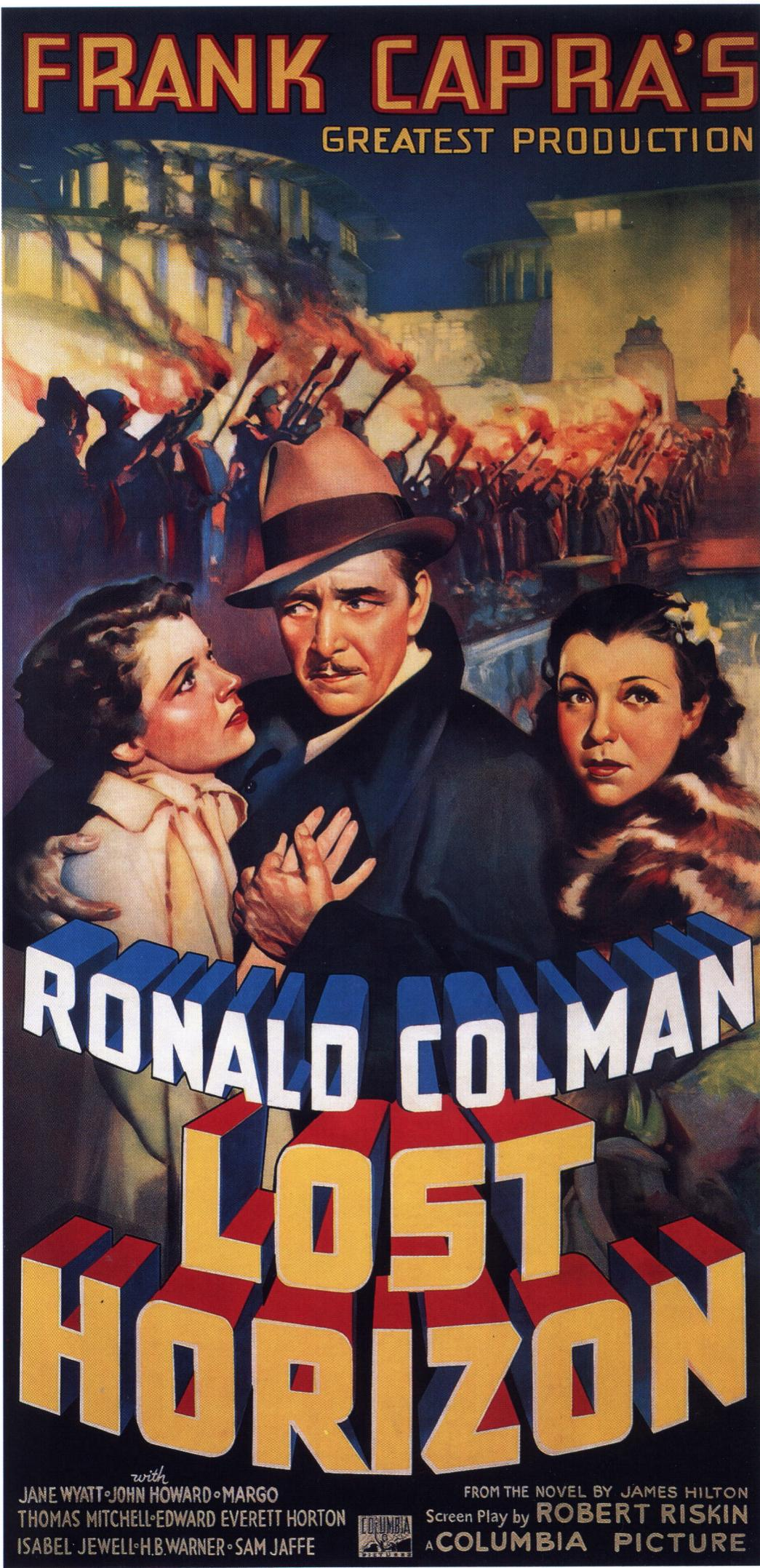
Three-sheet theatrical poster

When the movie premiered at the Radio City Music Hall, Frank S. Nugent of The New York Times called it, "a grand adventure film, magnificently staged, beautifully photographed, and capitally played." He continued,

[T]here is no denying the opulence of the production, the impressiveness of the sets, the richness of the costuming, the satisfying attention to large and small detail which makes Hollywood at its best such a generous entertainer. We can deride the screen in its lesser moods, but when the West Coast impresarios decide to shoot the works the resulting pyrotechnics bathe us in a warm and cheerful glow. ... The penultimate scenes are as vivid, swift, and brilliantly achieved as the first. Only the conclusion itself is somehow disappointing. But perhaps that is inescapable, for there can be no truly satisfying end to any fantasy. ... Mr. Capra was guilty of a few directorial clichés, but otherwise it was a perfect job. Unquestionably the picture has the best photography and sets of the year. By all means it is worth seeing.

Nugent later named it one of the 10 best films of the year.

The Hollywood Reporter called it "an artistic tour de force ... in all ways, a triumph for Frank Capra." Variety called it a "sterling" adaptation of Hilton's novel that "can take its place with the best prestige pictures of the industry." The Film Daily declared it an "Impressive and artistic drama" and "distinctly a worthwhile contribution to the industry."

Less enthusiastic was Otis Ferguson, who in his review for National Board of Review Magazine observed, "This film was made with obvious care and expense, but it will be notable in the future only as the first wrong step in a career that till now has been a denial of the very tendencies in pictures which this film represents." John Mosher of The New Yorker praised the "beautiful flying scenes" and the "wild and terrifying bits of struggle on mountain peaks and crags", but found the adaptation in general to be "somewhat longish and wearisome on the screen. I thought the old lama would go on talking forever." Joseph McBride in a later biography notes that Capra's emphasis on theme rather than people was evident in the film; he also considered the film a financial "debacle".

In The Spectator, Graham Greene agreed with the less enthusiastic American reviewers.

Nothing reveals men's characters more than their Utopias ... this Utopia closely resembles a film star's luxurious estate on Beverly Hills: flirtatious pursuits through grape arbours, splashings and divings in blossomy pools under improbable waterfalls, and rich and enormous meals ... something incurably American: a kind of aerated idealism, ('We have one simple rule, Kindness') and of course, a girl (Miss Jane Wyatt, one of the dumber stars), who has read all the best books (this one included) and has the coy comradely manner of a not too advanced schoolmistress.

For Greene, the film is "very long" and "very dull ... as soon as the opening scenes are over". He also regretted the film's missed opportunities: "If the long, dull ethical sequences had been cut to the bone there would have been plenty of room for the real story: the shock of Western crudity and injustice on a man returned from a more gentle and beautiful way of life".

== Awards and nominations ==
Stephen Goosson's elaborate sets won him the Academy Award for Best Art Direction, and Gene Havlick and Gene Milford shared the Academy Award for Best Film Editing.

The film was nominated for the Academy Award for Best Picture, but lost to The Life of Emile Zola. H.B. Warner lost the Academy Award for Best Supporting Actor to Joseph Schildkraut for his role as Alfred Dreyfus in The Life of Emile Zola. Although Dimitri Tiomkin composed the music, the nomination for the Academy Award for Best Original Score went to Morris Stoloff, the head of the music department at Columbia Pictures. The Oscar went to Charles Previn of Universal Pictures for One Hundred Men and a Girl. John P. Livadary was nominated for the Academy Award for Best Sound Recording, but lost to Thomas Moulton for The Hurricane. Charles C. Coleman, nominated for the Academy Award for Best Assistant Director, lost to Robert Webb for In Old Chicago. This was the last year an Oscar was awarded in this category.

American Film Institute (AFI) list nominations

- AFI's 100 Years...100 Movies
- AFI's 100 Years of Film Scores
- AFI's 100 Years...100 Movies (10th Anniversary Edition)
- AFI's 10 Top 10 – Fantasy Film

== Adaptations to other media ==
Lost Horizon was adapted as a radio play starring Ronald Colman and Donald Crisp for the September 15, 1941, broadcast of Lux Radio Theatre. Colman reprised his role for the November 27, 1946, broadcast of Academy Award and the July 24, 1948, broadcast of Favorite Story.

In 1946, Ronald Colman also made a three-record, 78 rpm album based on the film for American Decca Records. The score for the album was by Victor Young.

Another radio adaptation starring Herbert Marshall was broadcast on December 30, 1948, on Hallmark Playhouse.

A three-part radio dramatization was made by the BBC and released in September 1981. It featured Derek Jacobi as Hugh Conway.

A stage musical called Shangri-La was produced on Broadway in 1956, but closed after only 21 performances. It was staged for a 1960 Hallmark Hall of Fame television broadcast.

== In popular culture ==
- Harry E. Huffman, owner of a chain of movie theaters in downtown Denver, Colorado, built a replica of the monastery depicted in the film as a private residence in 1937, calling it Shangri-La.
- The 1953 short story "The Nine Billion Names of God" by Arthur C. Clarke, set in a Tibetan lamasery, references the film, with the characters nicknaming the lamasery "Shangri-La", and referring to the chief lama as "Sam Jaffe".
- Author Harlan Ellison alluded to the film in a 1995 television commentary for the program Sci-Fi Buzz, wherein he lamented what he perceived as a prevailing cultural illiteracy.
- A few seconds of the film can be seen in the Mad Men season 7 premiere, "Time Zones" (airdate April 13, 2014), when the character Don Draper briefly watches a late-night broadcast featuring the opening intertitle while visiting his wife Megan in California.
- A couple of scenes leading up to the plane crash are incorporated into A Wish for Wings That Work.
- In a Peanuts comic strip by Charles Schulz published February 20, 1974, Woodstock plays trivia with Snoopy, asking "Who was the pilot of the plane that took Ronald Colman to Shangri-la in 'Lost Horizon'?"

== See also ==
- List of films cut over the director's opposition
- List of incomplete or partially lost films
