= Rich Miller (baseball) =

American baseball player and manager

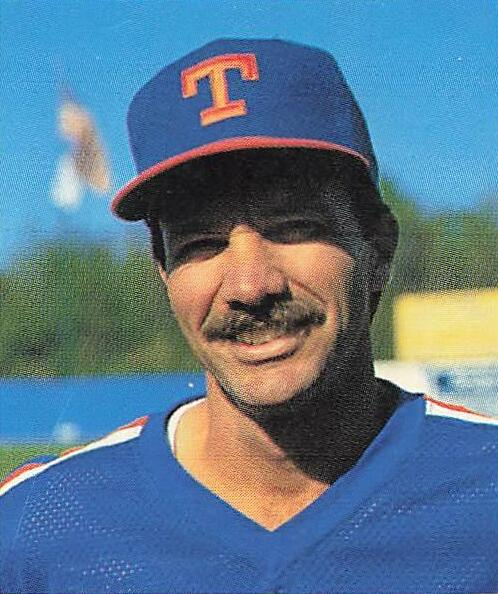
- Miller as a coach with the Tidewater Tides c. 1988
- Outfielder / Coach
- Born: September 4, 1951 (age 74); Lebanon, Pennsylvania
- Stats at Baseball Reference

Richard Edwin Miller (born September 4, 1951) is an American former professional baseball outfielder. Since the 1980s, he has worked as an instructor, coach, and manager in Minor League Baseball.

== Playing career ==
Miller spent his playing career in the New York Mets organization. He graduated from Lebanon Catholic High School and West Chester State College, where he earned a bachelor's degree in health and physical education. He was the Mets' sixth pick in the 1973 Major League Baseball draft. As a player, he stood 5 feet 9 inches (1.75 m) tall, weighed 162 pounds (73 kg), batted left-handed and threw right-handed. While he never played Major League Baseball, he reached the highest level of the New York farm system, spending 2½ seasons with the Triple-A Tidewater Tides of the International League from 1976 to 1978. In 1977, Miller led the team in hitting with a .284 batting average. During his eight-year minor league career, Miller batted .258 with 28 home runs.

== Coaching career ==
Miller was a player-coach for the Jackson Mets of the Texas League in 1979–1980, then turned his hand to full-time coaching, scouting and managing in the Mets' system. After a stint as a manager in Short Season-A and Class A ball, he spent 13 seasons as the Mets' roving minor league outfield and baserunning instructor. During his last three seasons with the Mets (2001–2003), he also served as assistant field coordinator. After 31 years with the Mets, he joined the Rochester Red Wings, the Minnesota Twins' Triple-A affiliate, as a coach in 2004. On April 21, 2005, he took over as interim manager when Wings' skipper Phil Roof took a leave of absence to be with his wife, who was battling cancer. Rochester went 69–62 under Miller's guidance the rest of the season. He returned to his former post as a Rochester coach until the 2008 season, when he was promoted to roving outfield, baserunning and bunting instructor for the Twins' Double-A and Triple-A affiliates. He began the 2009 baseball season as the hitting coach with the Twins' Single-A Midwest League affiliate, the Beloit Snappers, and was promoted to the same job with Rochester in July 2009.

In November 2009, Miller was named roving minor league outfield and baserunning coordinator by the Toronto Blue Jays. In August 2011, Miller was asked to step in as acting manager for the Vancouver Canadians, the Class A short-season affiliate of the Blue Jays, when the previous skipper was forced to take a leave of absence. Miller managed Vancouver to the 2011 Northwest League championship. In 2013, Miller was promoted to Senior Roving Instructor and in 2014 to Senior Advisor in the Blue Jays' minor-league system. On January 19, 2017, it was announced that Miller would return to managing the Canadians. On September 2, 2017, Miller was named the Northwest League's Manager of the Year after managing the Canadians to a Northwest League championship. Despite the championship and accolades, the Blue Jays organization released Miller on September 19.

== Personal ==
In 1989 Miller was inducted into the West Chester College Baseball Hall of Fame, which has since become the West Chester University Sports Hall of Fame; 1993 brought Miller's induction into the Central Pennsylvania Chapter of the Pennsylvania Sports Hall of Fame.
