= Harry E. Huffman =

American movie theater owner (1883–1969)

- Born: 1883
- Died: 1969 (aged 85–86); Denver, Colorado, US
- Resting place: Fairmount Cemetery
- Years active: 1921–1950
- Known for: Owner of major movie theaters in downtown Denver

Harry E. Huffman (1883–1969) was an American movie theater owner and manager. Originally a pharmacist in Denver, Colorado, he began purchasing movie theaters after seeing a motion picture for the first time and foreseeing their potential cultural impact. In 1921, he purchased the movie theater next to his drugstore, and went on to own most of the major movie theaters in Denver at one time or another, earning him the nickname "Mr. Movies". He briefly owned a radio station and television station. He has been described as "the most powerful single voice in the development of popular entertainment and culture in Denver during the first-half of the 20th century". His home, a two-story mansion that he named Shangri-La, was a replica of the fictional monastery seen in the 1937 film Lost Horizon. The home was a fixture on the city's social scene as Huffman and his wife hosted lavish parties there for prominent guests from the business and entertainment worlds.

== Career ==
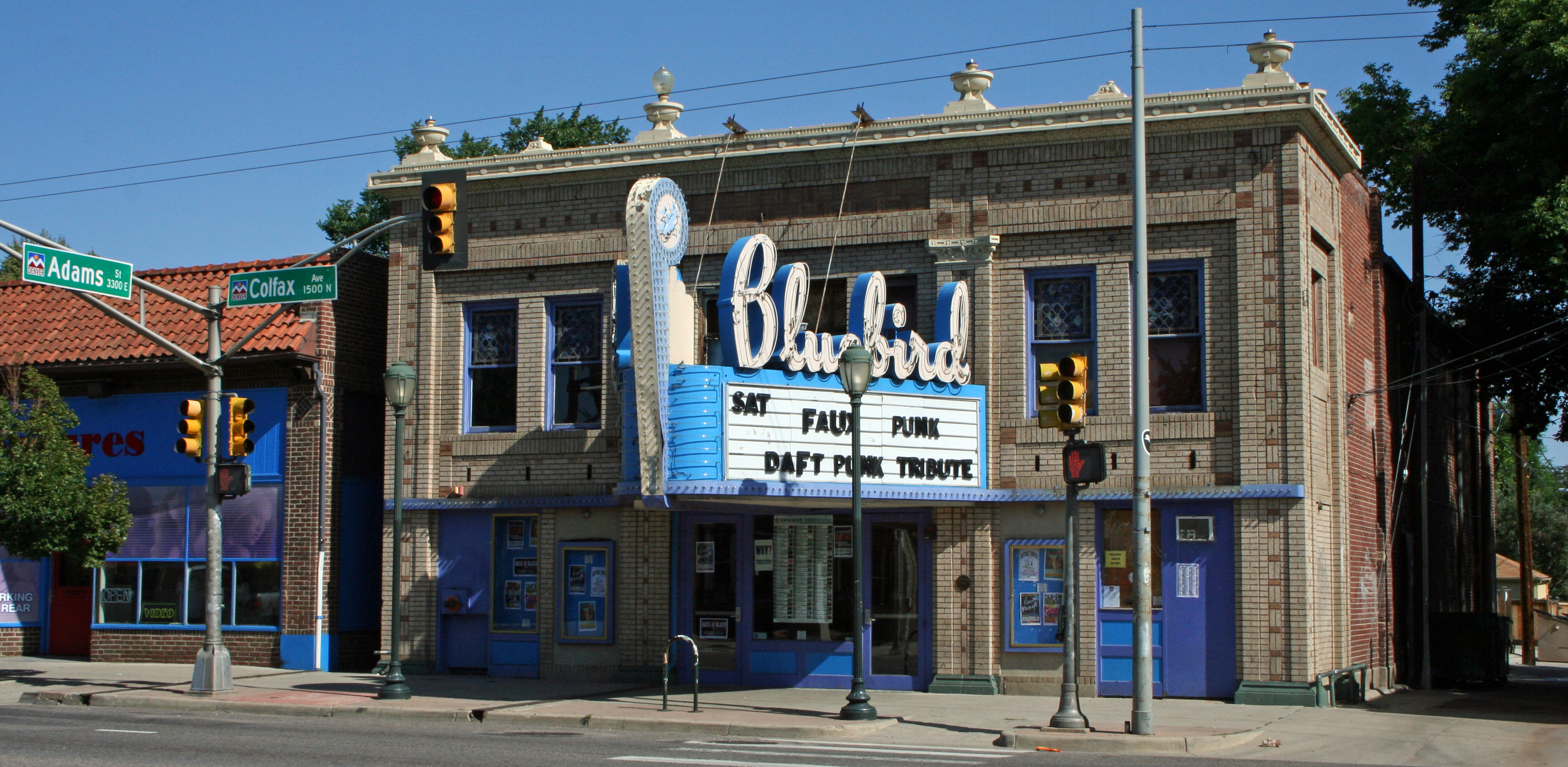
Bluebird Theater, a National Register of Historic Places site

Harry E. Huffman was originally a pharmacist who owned a drugstore on West Colfax Avenue in Denver. After seeing a movie for the first time, he foresaw the potential cultural impact of the medium and purchased the Bide-a-Wee Theater, a nickelodeon theater adjacent to his store. With an eye to increasing his pharmacy trade, he combined the two businesses. For years, his store clerks were expected to perform the songs in the silent films playing at the theater.

In spring 1921, Huffman bought the Thompson Theater from a local grocer and renamed it the Bluebird Theater. At that point, he stopped actively managing his pharmacy business in favor of theater management. He acquired two more theaters before building, in 1926, the Aladdin Theater on East Colfax Avenue. The Aladdin became one of the city's prominent first-run theaters. The design of the four-story, $750,000 structure topped with an onion dome was inspired by the Taj Mahal. Interior ornamentation included "arabesques, muqarnas, ogee arches, and geometric tiling". The ceiling of the 911-seat auditorium was embedded with thousands of tiny colored lights. The theater was the fourth in the United States to install the Vitaphone sound system; Huffman was the first theater owner to negotiate a contract with Vitaphone. The Jazz Singer, the first feature film with sound, premiered in Denver at the Aladdin.

By 1933, Huffman owned seven theaters: the Bide-a-Wee, the Bluebird, the Aladdin, the America, the Colorado, the Rialto, and the Orpheum. He co-founded a marketing promotion called "Bank Night" to increase attendance during the Great Depression. The promotion involved a weekly drawing for cash and other prizes, which attracted thousands of paying customers. Hundreds more non-moviegoers stood outside the theaters to listen to the names of the winners being broadcast over a loudspeaker system. In the early 1940s, Huffman's theaters participated in the sale of war bonds.

By 1937, Huffman was simultaneously operating nine theaters, most of them in the downtown area. That year, he merged his seven owned theaters with five theaters owned by Fox to create the Fox-Intermountain Theater Corporation. He served as general manager for the new movie theater chain until 1950.

In 1950, Huffman bought the KLZ radio station. He next opened the KLZ-TV (now KMGH-TV) television station in 1953. In 1954, he sold both licenses to the LTF Broadcasting Corporation, a division of Time Inc., for more than $3.5 million.

== Memberships and affiliations ==
In 1930, Huffman became a member of the board of directors of American National Bank. He later served as president of the Denver Aviation and Vacation Exposition, and was a founder of the Denver Convention and Visitors Bureau, serving as its president for 13 years.

During World War II, Huffman was a member of the Governor's Committee for Public Health. He was "specifically influential in educating the public on eye problems". He himself was affected with glaucoma.

== Residence ==
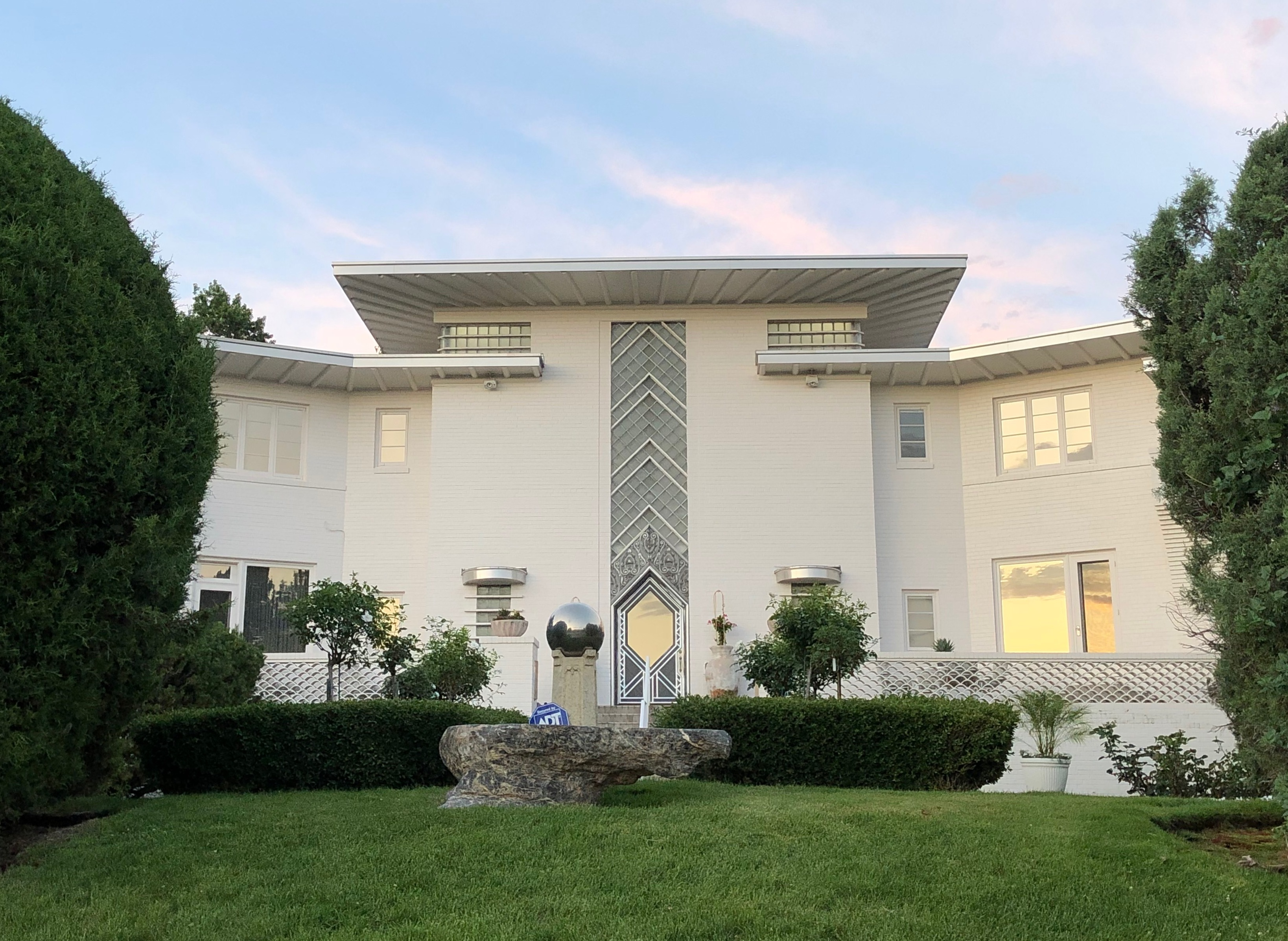
Shangri-La

In the mid-1930s, Huffman purchased a 5-acre (2.0 ha) tract of land located outside the city on which to construct a private residence. He tapped Denver architect Raymond Harry Ervin to design a replica of the monastery seen in the 1937 film Lost Horizon. The Streamline Moderne mansion was called Shangri-La. The mansion became a fixture on Denver's social scene as Huffman and his wife Christine hosted lavish parties for prominent guests from the business and entertainment worlds.

== Personal life ==
Huffman considered the number 13 lucky. A 1947 Denver Post column noted that Huffman "was born on the 13th day of the month, became engaged on the 13th, contracted for purchases of several Denver cinemas on the 13th, and made his first loan, of $1,300, on the 13th. His car license begins with 13, his house is surrounded by 13 acres on country road 13, is complete with 13 rooms, and bears the number of 13 Leets Dale Drive".

Huffman died in 1969.

== Sources ==
- Bretz, James (2005). Mansions of Denver: The Vintage Years 1870–1938. Pruett Publishing. ISBN 9780871089373.
- Leonard, Stephen J.; Noel, Thomas Jacob (1990). Denver: Mining camp to metropolis. University Press of Colorado. ISBN 9780870811852.
- Noel, Thomas Jacob; Norgren, Barbara S. (1987). Denver: The city beautiful and its architects, 1893–1941. Historic Denver. ISBN 9780914248040.
- Siegel, Susan (2006). A Resource Guide to the Golden Age of Radio: Special Collections, Bibliography and the Internet. Book Hunter Press. ISBN 9781891379048.
- Western Folklore. Vol. 6. California Folklore Society. 1947.
