= 1982 Atlanta Braves season =

1982 Atlanta Braves
- National League West champions
- League: National League
- Division: West
- Ballpark: Atlanta–Fulton County Stadium
- City: Atlanta, Georgia
- Record: 89–73 (.549)
- Divisional place: 1st
- Owners: Ted Turner
- General managers: John Mullen
- Managers: Joe Torre
- Television: WTBS; Superstation WTBS
- Radio: WSB (Ernie Johnson, Pete Van Wieren, Skip Caray, Darrel Chaney)

The 1982 Atlanta Braves season was the club's 17th in Atlanta and its 112th overall. They began the season with a modern Major League Baseball record 13-game winning streak and finished with a record of 89–73 (.549) (the best record in the Torre era). The Braves won the National League West for the first time since 1969 but were swept in three games by the St. Louis Cardinals in the NLCS.

== Offseason ==
- October 5, 1981: Gaylord Perry was released by the Braves.
- March 23, 1982: Brian Asselstine was released by the Braves.

== Managerial turnover ==
In 2014, Bobby Cox and Joe Torre were elected to the Baseball Hall of Fame as two of the most successful managers of the late-20th and early-21st centuries. Cox had won 2,564 regular-season games, five pennants and one World Series over 29 seasons; Torre had won 2,326 games, six pennants and four World Series over his 29-year career. But when the 1981 season ended, both men were dismissed from their managerial positions.

The New York Mets fired Torre on October 5, 1981; the Braves dismissed Cox three days later. Cox, finishing his fourth season during his first tour as Atlanta's manager, was only 266–323 (.452) with one over-.500 season; Torre was 286–420 (.405) in 4 1/2 seasons with the Mets. In both 1978 and 1979, Cox's Braves and Torre's Mets had each finished in the cellar of their respective National League divisions.

Cox, then 40 years old, was named manager of the American League Toronto Blue Jays—then a struggling expansion team in its fifth year of existence—on October 15, 1981; nine days later, Torre, 41, was announced as Cox's successor in Atlanta, returning to the team where he had become an All-Star catcher during the 1960s.

Torre's 1982 Braves won their first 13 regular-season games en route to the National League West Division title, their first since 1969. In three full seasons with the Braves, he went 257–229 (.529) and gained wider recognition as a manager through the Braves' WTBS Superstation. Although a later, 5 1/2-year term (1990–1995) with the St. Louis Cardinals was not as successful, Torre would earn his Hall of Fame credentials with a 12-year run (1996–2007) as manager of the New York Yankees, winning six AL championships and four World Series, and compiling a winning percentage of .605.

 Cox took a different path. His talented but young 1982 Blue Jays, though still below .500, won more games (78) than ever before in their history. Then they broke through, winning 89 games in both 1983 and 1984.  Finally, in 1985, they captured 99 victories to win the American League East Division by a two-game margin over the Yankees. The Jays held a three games to one edge in the 1985 American League Championship Series, only to drop three straight games and the AL pennant to the eventual world champion Kansas City Royals.

Ted Turner's Braves, however, were heading in the opposite direction after 1982. He fired Torre after an 80–82 (.494) 1984 season, then fired two more managers, Eddie Haas and Bobby Wine, after they lost a combined 96 games in 1985. Turner turned to yet another manager for 1986, Chuck Tanner, but he also decided to replace his general manager, John Mullen, with a new baseball man: Cox, induced to return to Atlanta for a promotion and a multi-year contract.

Cox would begin to rebuild the Braves from the front office, but the on-field losses continued to mount until Cox finally decided, on June 21, 1990, to return to uniform and the dugout as the team's manager. By 1991, the Braves would be National League champions.

== The regular season ==
=== The first half of the season ===
The Braves started very hot in 1982, winning their first 13 games (April 6 through April 21) of the season, a new major league record (since equaled by the Milwaukee Brewers in 1987 and by the Tampa Bay Rays in 2023). The wins came at the expense of San Diego Padres (two), Houston Astros (six) and Cincinnati Reds (five). The streak began with a 1–0 victory in San Diego in the season opener and came to an end when the Reds edged the Braves 2–1 in Atlanta in the Braves' 14th game.

The Braves lost five straight after their record start and by the end of May they were 27–20 (.574) and struggling. Some critics claimed the Braves were just living off the feat of their 13-game winning streak and that they were not as good as their record showed. Some of the critics even predicted that the Braves would drift slowly out of contention and would be out of the running by mid-summer. However, the Braves warmed up again, and they won 12 of their first 15 games in the month of June to jump to 16 games above the .500 mark at 39 wins and 23 losses. This gave evidence that the Braves's 13–0 start was not just a fluke of luck, and this silenced their critics–at least for a while.

Next, the Braves slowed down again, and they slipped to a 43–29 (.597) record on June 29, but then they reeled off another six-game winning streak to build up a 4 1/2 game lead in the National League Western Division on July 5. The Braves split their next four games, and they had a record of 51–31 (.622) on July 9 following a 6–4 victory over the Pittsburgh Pirates. That meant the Braves were setting pace to win 100 games for the season, which is a traditional mark for a very good team in either league. This was great improvement for a team that had struggled, mostly in the cellar, in 1975 through 1981. On the two days right before the All-Star Game, the Braves lost to the Pirates 6–1 and 3–1, but they were still on the top of the Western Division by two-games in the standings.

=== Second half ===
The Braves started the second half of the 1982 season following the All-Star break with five wins versus only one loss in their first six games. This improved the Braves' won-loss record to 56–34 (.622) on July 20. Their lead over the second-place team in the division was then six games. That was the largest lead that a Braves team had ever achieved since the Braves had come to Atlanta for the 1966 season, even surpassing their largest divisional lead of their Western Division championship team of 1969.

However, from July 21 to 25, the Braves endured a small dip. They lost three out of four games, and their offense was atrocious, with their being shut out in all three of the losses: once by the St. Louis Cardinals and twice by the Pittsburgh Pirates. The Braves scored a rather-average four runs in the game that they won. Nevertheless, the Braves were 20 games over .500 with a record of 57–37 (.606). They were also settling in for an 11-game series in their home ballpark, followed by an 11-game road trip, all of which were against foes in the Western Division.

The second-place San Diego Padres played against the Braves in Atlanta Stadium for the first four games. The Padres were followed by the third-place Los Angeles Dodgers for the next four games; and finally the fourth-place San Francisco Giants played three games against the Braves. Next, the Braves were back on the road again for four games with the Dodgers, three more with the Giants, and finally four more games versus the Padres.

The Braves had a five-game lead in the standings when the home series versus the Padres began. The Braves began the series by sweeping a doubleheader against the Padres by 9–2 and 8–6 scores. The Braves repeated this game on the next night with another 8–6 victory. Their lead in the Western Division had increased to a high-water mark of eight games, and the Padres were on their way down and out of second place and out of contention. The Braves' primary stalker for the rest of the season became the Los Angeles Dodgers.

With their 6–2 victory over the Padres on July 29, the Braves completed the four-game sweep, and the Braves' record soared to 61–37 (.622) – the first time since 1969 when the Braves once reached a high-water mark of 25 games over .500. The Braves held a nine-game lead over the Padres (at 53–47 (.530)), and a 10 1/2 game lead over the third-place Dodgers (52–49 (.515)). The Giants (48–52 (.480)) had nearly fallen out of contention, 14 games behind the Braves, and with a losing record.

This lead of nine games in the standings was the largest lead that the Braves had ever had since they moved to Atlanta for the 1966 season. The Braves' All-Star outfielder Dale Murphy had 11 hits in 16 at-bats in the sweep over the Padres, and for the season, he was batting .308 and leading the National League with 28 home runs and 74 runs batted in (RBI). Their other big bats were those of their third baseman Bob Horner, who was batting .289 with 20 home runs so far, and their first baseman Chris Chambliss, a .259 hitter thus far with 11 homers and 48 RBI. Their only reliable starting pitcher was Phil Niekro (10–3, 3.27 ERA), and their two big guns as relief pitchers were Steve Bedrosian with a 1.46 ERA, and Gene Garber with a 2.16 ERA and 19 saves already. The overall pitching staff had a 3.60 ERA, and the team batting average was .262. The Braves had scored 447 runs so far. Rick Camp, a part-time starter, was 8–4 with a 3.14 ERA

This big lead in the Western Division did not last for long. During that stretch of 21 games against just the Dodgers, the Giants, the Padres, and the Montreal Expos, the Braves seemed to be moving in slow motion both on the pitcher's mound and in the batting boxes as they slumped badly and lost 19 out of 21 games – including an 11-game losing steak and four-game losing streaks twice.

The Dodgers, under their long-time manager Tommy Lasorda, had turned both hot and lucky at the same time. Eight out of those 19 losses during this frantic nose-dive by the Braves were to the Dodgers, who swept the Braves 4–0 in two series against them in a 10-day period. The Braves' wins and losses during these 21 games were against the Dodgers (0–8), the Giants (1–5), the Padres (1–3), and the Expos (0–3).

On August 18, the Braves lost their third game in a row to the Expos, completing another four-game losing streak, and their won-loss record had fallen to 63–56 (.529). In so doing, they had fallen into second place in the Western Division, four games behind the Dodgers, who had moved into first place by winning 16 out of 20 games. The Braves seemed to be on track to lose the Western Division for the 13th year in a row, and miss the post-season once again. The Braves had not won a playoff series since they won the World Series in 1957, and they had played in few playoff games since then (seven vs. the New York Yankees in 1958, two vs. the Dodgers in 1959, and three vs. the New York Mets in 1969 – and losing nine of those games).

However, the Braves righted themselves as a team, and their clouds of bad luck seemed to part. Beginning on August 19 with a win over the Expos in the last game of the series with them, the Braves roared back into first place by winning 13 out of 15 games while the Dodgers played ordinary baseball.

On September 3, the Braves' won-loss record had improved to 76–58 (.567); they were ahead of the Dodgers by 2 1/2 games. However, their travails were not over, as they once again lost four games in a row and fell back into second place behind the Dodgers. Now, it was time for head-to-head competition with the Dodgers again. The Braves defeated the Dodgers in two consecutive games, on September 8 and 9, to once again move into first place (with a 78–62 (.557) record) by 1 1/2 games over the Dodgers.

There was more hardship to come. The Braves lost eight out of 12 games, including six losses to a different nemesis this time, the Houston Astros. This dropped the Braves back into second place, a full three games behind the Dodgers on September 22.

However, the Braves won seven out of their next nine games, while the Dodgers played ordinary baseball, and the Braves moves into first place for good on September 28. However, there was a final day of severe tension on the last day of the season. Beginning that day, the Braves were one game ahead of the Dodgers, with the Braves holding an 89–72 (.553) record and the Dodgers holding an 88–73 (.547) record. The Braves had a game in the Eastern Time Zone earlier in the day, and the Dodgers had a game with the Giants in San Francisco later on in the day in the Pacific Time Zone.

The Braves could have clinched the division championship by winning, but they lost their last game vs. the Padres 5–1. Then, in the later game, the Dodgers could have tied for first place by defeating the Giants. If that had happened, it would have required a one-game playoff between the Dodgers and the Braves to determine the Division champion. However, late in that game in San Francisco, former Cincinnati Reds' second baseman Joe Morgan hit a home run against the Dodgers to knock them out of the playoffs. Phil Niekro finished the season as the pitching star of the Braves with a 17–4 record, and Dale Murphy won the National League Most Valuable Player trophy by winning the league championship in home runs, tying for the championship in RBIs, and winning a Gold Glove in the outfield.

The Braves had won their second Western Division title, and they were bound for the National League Championship Series against the St. Louis Cardinals. The Braves had won the first-ever Western Division championship in 1969, the year in which the Eastern Division and the Western Division had been established. Then, the Braves had posted a 93–69 (.574) won-loss record by playing very strongly in second half of the season. For the Braves, Niekro himself had finished second for the Cy Young Award with 23 wins, and Hank Aaron had finished second in the league with 44 home runs. Thus, each of these teams had won the division by having one truly outstanding pitcher, and one truly outstanding batter.

Since the Braves had finished at 89–73 (.549), they had recorded a 76–73 (.510) record after beginning the season at 13–0. On the other hand, the Braves recorded a 26–17 (.605) record after August 18. This was just the Braves' second season with a winning record since they recorded an 88–74 (.543) record in 1974 and finished in third place in the Western Division. The Braves' only other (barely) winning season during that period was in 1980, when they struggled to an 81–80 (.503) finish. (The Braves played an odd number of games in 1980 since they had a game rained out during the season, and since the 162nd game would have no effect whatsoever on the standings, no make-up game for that game was ever played. It had become a moot point by then.)

==== Stars ====
Although it was their field manager Joe Torre who led the Braves back to the Western Division championship in 1982, there was a kernel of Braves' players who made the difference in this season. Two of these were Dale Murphy and Bob Horner, the latter of whom batted .261 with 32 home runs and 97 RBI – but missed most of August and September with a broken wrist that he suffered while diving for a batted ball while playing third base. Murphy, who usually batted ahead of Horner in the line-up, posted a healthier .281 batting average with 36 home runs, 109 RBI, and 23 stolen bases, and he also led the team in runs scored. As mentioned before, Murphy won the league MVP trophy.

The Braves' first baseman, Chris Chambliss, batted .270, with 20 home runs and 88 RBI. Outfielder Claudell Washington had one of his best seasons with the Braves in 1982. He batted .266 with 16 homers and 80 RBI. The twenty-four-year-old second base-shortstop duo of Glenn Hubbard and Rafael Ramírez proved to be stellar on defense, and steady on offense – often getting on base ahead of Murphy and Horner. They were adept at turning double plays around the second-base bag. Hubbard batted .248 with nine home runs and 59 RBI, while Ramírez batted higher with a .278 average, ten home runs, and 52 RBI.

Their utility infielder Jerry Royster batted rather well over the final two months of the season (with a .322 BBA) to finish the season with a .295 average in 261 at-bats. He had been batting just .180 on July 29. Royster's value was seen, and his high number of at bats accumulated, in that he filled in for either Hubbard or Ramirez when they needed a day off, and he also filled in at third base for many weeks while Horner was suffering from his broken wrist. If the need had arisen, Royster was also capable of playing at first base or in the outfield.

The part-time outfielder Rufino Linares batted .298 with two home runs and 17 RBI, but their opening-day starter in center field Brett Butler played well in the field, but he had an atrocious season at home plate where he batted just .217 and he hit just two doubles in 240 at bats (The slightly-built Butler never was a power hitter, and in 1982, he did not hit any homers.) The Braves's regular catcher Bruce Benedict batted .248 with just three home runs – one of them a grand slam that he hit of the great Dodger pitcher Fernando Valenzuela in a game during September. The Braves' backup catcher, Biff Pocoroba, finished with a .275 average in 120 at bats.

What the Braves lacked in their position players in 1982 were the following:

1. A catcher who could either hit with a lot of power or with a high batting average.
2. An everyday left fielder who field well, and also bat extremely well, preferably with power.
3. More depth both in the infield and the outfield, where often the Braves were quite thin, especially when they had players who suffered from serious problems, like Bob Horner and Brett Butler. This thinness on their squad also meant that they lacked much capability in pinch hitting.

Phil Niekro was the ace of Atlanta's pitching staff and led the team with a 17-4 win–loss record and a 3.61 ERA in 35 starts. Niekro also led the team with 144 strikeouts. Gene Garber led the team with 30 saves in 69 games, allowing just four home runs with a 2.34 ERA in 119 1/3 innings pitched. Steve Bedrosian was the best long-reliever posting an 8–6 record and a 2.42 ERA in 64 games. Despite having a 4.87 ERA in 27 games started, Bob Walk finished with an 11–9 win–loss record, tied for second on the team in pitching wins with Rick Camp who accumulated a record of 11–13, and a 3.85 ERA in 51 games, including starting 21 games. Rick Mahler rounded out the '82 Braves pitching staff with a 9–10 win–loss record and a 4.21 ERA in 33 starts over 205 1/3 innings pitched. Pascual Pérez, who was poised to breakout in the 1983 season, started just 11 games and made five relief appearances in the '82 season. He finished with a 4–4 record and a solid 3.06 ERA in 79 1/3 innings pitched.

Beyond Niekro, the Braves' starting pitching was extremely thin, and it caused problems. Pascual Perez was one year away from becoming a star pitcher for the Braves, which he did in 1983, along with a new rookie who also came up. Bob Walk did not last long, and Rick Camp was to become a short-relief pitcher for the Braves in the future. Besides Niekro, the thing that Torre had for his job of running a pitching staff made of bubble gum and bailing wire was his outstanding relief duo of Garber and Bedrosian. In Bedrosian, Torre had a future Cy Young Award Winner, but with the Philadelphia Phillies.

=== Season standings ===
NL West
Team	W	L	Pct.	GB	Home	Road
Atlanta Braves	89	73	.549	—	42‍–‍39	47‍–‍34
Los Angeles Dodgers	88	74	.543	1	43‍–‍38	45‍–‍36
San Francisco Giants	87	75	.537	2	45‍–‍36	42‍–‍39
San Diego Padres	81	81	.500	8	43‍–‍38	38‍–‍43
Houston Astros	77	85	.475	12	43‍–‍38	34‍–‍47
Cincinnati Reds	61	101	.377	28	33‍–‍48	28‍–‍53

=== Record vs. opponents ===
1982 National League record Sources:
Team	ATL	CHC	CIN	HOU	LAD	MON	NYM	PHI	PIT	SD	SF	STL
Atlanta	—	8–4	14–4	10–8	7–11	5–7	9–3	6–6	4–8	11–7	8–10	7–5
Chicago	4–8	—	6–6	9–3	5–7	6–12	9–9	9–9	9–9	4–8	6–6	6–12
Cincinnati	4–14	6–6	—	7–11	7–11	4–8	7–5	5–7	4–8	6–12	6–12	5–7
Houston	8–10	3–9	11–7	—	7–11	4–8	8–4	7–5	9–3	9–9	5–13	6–6
Los Angeles	11–7	7–5	11–7	11–7	—	8–4	6–6	4–8	5–7	9–9	9–9	7–5
Montreal	7–5	12–6	8–4	8–4	4–8	—	11–7	8–10	7–11	7–5	4–8	10–8
New York	3–9	9–9	5–7	4–8	6–6	7–11	—	7–11	8–10	6–6	4–8	6–12
Philadelphia	6-6	9–9	7–5	5–7	8–4	10–8	11–7	—	9–9	7–5	10–2	7–11
Pittsburgh	8–4	9–9	8–4	3–9	7–5	11–7	10–8	9–9	—	6–6	6–6	7–11
San Diego	7–11	8–4	12–6	9–9	9–9	5–7	6–6	5–7	6–6	—	10–8	4–8
San Francisco	10–8	6–6	12–6	13–5	9–9	8–4	8–4	2–10	6–6	8–10	—	5–7
St. Louis	5–7	12–6	7–5	6–6	5–7	8–10	12–6	11–7	11–7	8–4	7–5	—

=== Opening Day starters ===
- Rick Mahler
- Bruce Benedict
- Chris Chambliss
- Glenn Hubbard
- Rafael Ramírez
- Bob Horner
- Dale Murphy
- Brett Butler
- Claudell Washington

=== Notable transactions ===
- April 23, 1982: Scott Patterson (minors) was traded by the Braves to the New York Yankees for Bob Watson.
- June 7, 1982: 1982 Major League Baseball draft
  - Duane Ward was drafted by the Braves in the 1st round (9th pick). Player signed June 18, 1982.
  - Zane Smith was drafted by the Braves in the 3rd round.
  - Randy Johnson was drafted by the Braves in the 4th round, but did not sign. (Note: This is not the same Randy Johnson who played for the Braves in 1982.)
- June 30, 1982: Larry McWilliams was traded by the Braves to the Pittsburgh Pirates for Pascual Pérez and a player to be named later. The Pirates finished the deal by sending Carlos Rios (minors) to the Braves on September 8.
- July 6, 1982: Preston Hanna was released by the Braves.

=== Roster ===
1982 Atlanta Braves
Roster
Pitchers: 50 Jose Alvarez; 32 Steve Bedrosian; 40 Tommy Boggs; 37 Rick Camp; 38 Joe Cowley; 30 Ken Dayley; 48 Carlos Diaz; 26 Gene Garber; 49 Preston Hanna; 34 Tom Hausman; 39 Al Hrabosky; 42 Rick Mahler; 27 Larry McWilliams; 31 Donnie Moore; 35 Phil Niekro; 27 Pascual Pérez; 43 Bob Walk	Catchers: 20 Bruce Benedict; 24 Larry Owen; 4 Biff Pocoroba; 14 Matt Sinatro; Infielders: 10 Chris Chambliss; 5 Bob Horner; 17 Glenn Hubbard; 6 Randy Johnson; 16 Rafael Ramírez; 1 Jerry Royster; 11 Ken Smith; 8 Bob Watson; 18 Paul Zuvella	Outfielders: 22 Brett Butler; 19 Terry Harper; 25 Rufino Linares; 3 Dale Murphy; 7 Bob Porter; 15 Claudell Washington; 28 Larry Whisenton; Other batters: 2 Albert Hall; 12 Paul Runge	Manager: 9 Joe Torre; Coaches: 23 Tommie Aaron; 45 Bob Gibson; 53 Dal Maxvill; 52 Joe Pignatano; 54 Rube Walker

=== Game log ===
Game Log
April

#	Date	Opponent	Site	Score	Win	Loss	Save	Attendance	Record
1	Tuesday, April 6	@ San Diego Padres	Jack Murphy Stadium	W, 1-0	R. Mahler (1-0)	Eichelberger (0-1)		30,188	1-0
2	Wednesday, April 7	@ San Diego Padres	Jack Murphy Stadium	W, 6-4	Walk (1-0)	Montefusco (0-1)	Garber (1)	16,684	2-0
3	Friday, April 9	Houston Astros	Atlanta–Fulton County Stadium	W, 6-2	Boggs (1-0)	Sutton (0-1)	Hrabosky (1)	33,133	3-0
4	Saturday, April 10	Houston Astros	Atlanta–Fulton County Stadium	W, 8-6	McWilliams (1-0)	Ruhle (0-1)	Camp (1)	10,885	4-0
5	Sunday, April 11	Houston Astros	Atlanta–Fulton County Stadium	W, 5-0	R. Mahler (2-0)	Ryan (0-2)		11,322	5-0
6	Monday, April 12	@ Cincinnati Reds	Riverfront Stadium	W, 6-1	Walk (2-0)	Berenyi (1-1)		11,451	6-0
7	Tuesday, April 13	@ Cincinnati Reds	Riverfront Stadium	W, 8-5	Garber (1-0)	Kern (0-1)		11,846	7-0
8	Wednesday, April 14	@ Cincinnati Reds	Riverfront Stadium	W, 5-2 (10 innings)	Camp (1-0)	Kern (0-2)		14,217	8-0
9	Friday, April 16	@ Houston Astros	Astrodome	W, 5-3	McWilliams (2-0)	Ryan (0-3)	Camp (2)	26,513	9-0
10	Saturday, April 17	@ Houston Astros	Astrodome	W, 2-1	Hanna (1-0)	J. Niekro (1-1)	Garber (2)	33,688	10-0
11	Sunday, April 18	@ Houston Astros	Astrodome	W, 6-5	Hrabosky (1-0)	D. Smith (0-1)	Camp (3)	29,166	11-0
12	Tuesday, April 20	Cincinnati Reds	Atlanta–Fulton County Stadium	W, 4-2	Bedrosian (1-0)	Pastore (1-1)	Garber (3)	37,268	12-0
13	Wednesday, April 21	Cincinnati Reds	Atlanta–Fulton County Stadium	W, 4-3	Camp (2-0)	Shirley (0-1)		22,153	13-0
14	Thursday, April 22	Cincinnati Reds	Atlanta–Fulton County Stadium	L, 1-2	Berenyi (3-1)	Walk (2-1)	Hume (3)	20,701	13-1
15	Friday, April 23	San Diego Padres	Atlanta–Fulton County Stadium	L, 3-6 (12 innings)	Chiffer (2-0)	Camp (2-1)		37,105	13-2
16	Saturday, April 24	@ San Diego Padres	Atlanta–Fulton County Stadium	L, 4-6	Show (2-0)	Garber (1-1)	DeLeon (1)	28,447	13-3
17	Monday, April 26	Pittsburgh Pirates	Atlanta–Fulton County Stadium	L, 4-6	Tekulve (2-0)	McWilliams (2-1)		9,557	13-4
18	Tuesday, April 27	Pittsburgh Pirates	Atlanta–Fulton County Stadium	L, 4-10	Griffin (1-1)	Walk (2-2)		6,763	13-5
19	Wednesday, April 28	Pittsburgh Pirates	Atlanta–Fulton County Stadium	W, 7-6 (10 innings)	Camp (3-1)	Scurry (1-1)		6,318	14-5
20	Thursday, April 29	Chicago Cubs	Atlanta–Fulton County Stadium	W, 3-0	Garber (2-1)	Jenkins (2-2)	Camp (4)	8,802	15-5
21	Friday, April 30	Chicago Cubs	Atlanta–Fulton County Stadium	W, 1-0	Bedrosian (2-0)	Bird (1-4)	Garber (4)	19,757	16-5

May

#	Date	Opponent	Site	Score	Win	Loss	Save	Attendance	Record
22	Saturday, May 1	Chicago Cubs	Atlanta–Fulton County Stadium	L, 1-5	Martz (2-2)	R. Mahler (2-1)		27,094	16-6
23	Sunday, May 2	Chicago Cubs	Atlanta–Fulton County Stadium	W, 10-3	Walk (3-2)	Larson (0-3)		19,494	17-6
24	Monday, May 3	@ Pittsburgh Pirates	Three Rivers Stadium	W, 10-4	P. Niekro (1-0)	Solomon (1-3)	Garber (5)	4,636	18-6
25	Tuesday, May 4	@ Pittsburgh Pirates	Three Rivers Stadium	L, 4-8	D. Robinson (2-0)	Cowley (0-1)		4,836	18-7
26	Wednesday, May 5	@ Pittsburgh Pirates	Three Rivers Stadium	L, 2-4	Rhoden (1-3)	R. Mahler (2-2)	Tekulve (2)	6,595	18-8
27	Friday, May 7	@ St. Louis Cardinals	Busch Memorial Stadium	W, 6-3 (10 innings)	Garber (3-1)	J. Martin (3-3)		20,276	19-8
28	Saturday, May 8	@ St. Louis Cardinals	Busch Memorial Stadium	L, 7-8	Sutter (1-0)	Camp (3-2)		49,062	19-9
29	Sunday, May 9	@ St. Louis Cardinals	Busch Memorial Stadium	W, 3-0	Hanna (2-0)	Andújar (3-3)	Garber (6)	25,115	20-9
30	Tuesday, May 11	@ Chicago Cubs	Wrigley Field	L, 4-6	Bird (2-4)	R. Mahler (2-3)	Hernández (2)	11,876	20-10
31	Wednesday, May 12	@ Chicago Cubs	Wrigley Field	W, 6-3	Walk (4-2)	Martz (3-3)	Garber (7)	11,392	21-10
32	Thursday, May 13	St. Louis Cardinals	Atlanta–Fulton County Stadium	L, 9-10	Rincon (2-2)	Dayley (0-1)	Sutter (11)	16,244	21-11
33	Friday, May 14	St. Louis Cardinals	Atlanta–Fulton County Stadium	W, 2-1	Garber (4-1)	Bair (3-1)		28,396	22-11
34	Saturday, May 15	St. Louis Cardinals	Atlanta–Fulton County Stadium	L, 6-7 (10 innings)	Sutter (2-0)	Garber (4-2)	Forsch (1)	48,433	22-12
35	Sunday, May 16	St. Louis Cardinals	Atlanta–Fulton County Stadium	W, 5-2	R. Mahler (3-3)	Mura (3-3)		20,478	23-12
36	Monday, May 17	@ Montreal Expos	Olympic Stadium	L, 0-4	Rogers (5-3)	Walk (4-3)		20,107	23-13
37	Tuesday, May 18	@ Montreal Expos	Olympic Stadium	W, 6-4	P. Niekro (2-0)	Gullickson (2-3)	Garber (8)	19,485	24-13
38	Wednesday, May 19	@ Montreal Expos	Olympic Stadium	W, 9-1	Dayley (1-1)	Burris (0-7)		11,634	25-13
39	Friday, May 21	Philadelphia Phillies	Atlanta–Fulton County Stadium	W, 7-6	Bedrosian (3-0)	Lyle (1-1)		28,050	26-13
40	Saturday, May 22	Philadelphia Phillies	Atlanta–Fulton County Stadium	L, 2-5	Krukow (4-2)	McWilliams (2-2)	Farmer (4)	25,925	26-14
41	Sunday, May 23	Philadelphia Phillies	Atlanta–Fulton County Stadium	L, 1-2	Ruthven (3-3)	P. Niekro (2-1)	Farmer (5)	27,965	26-15
42	Monday, May 24	New York Mets	Atlanta–Fulton County Stadium	L, 3-5	Zachry (4-1)	Dayley (1-2)	Allen (11)	10,388	26-16
43	Tuesday, May 25	New York Mets	Atlanta–Fulton County Stadium	W, 10-2	R. Mahler (4-3)	Scott (3-4)		9,581	27-16
44	Wednesday, May 26	New York Mets	Atlanta–Fulton County Stadium	L, 4-6	Swan (3-1)	Camp (3-3)	Allen (12)	12,460	27-17
45	Saturday, May 29	@ Philadelphia Phillies	Veterans Stadium	L, 0-1	Ruthven (4-3)	P. Niekro (2-2)		26,790	27-18
46	Sunday, May 30	@ Philadelphia Phillies	Veterans Stadium	L, 2-6	Carlton (6-6)	R. Mahler (4-4)		35,662	27-19
47	Monday, May 31	@ New York Mets	Shea Stadium	L, 4-10	Puleo (5-2)	Walk (4-4)		21,954	27-20

June

#	Date	Opponent	Site	Score	Win	Loss	Save	Attendance	Record
48	Tuesday, June 1	@ New York Mets	Shea Stadium	W, 7-3	Dayley (2-2)	Jones (6-4)		9,367	28-20
49	Wednesday, June 2	@ New York Mets	Shea Stadium	W, 3-1	P. Niekro (3-2)	Falcone (3-2)	Bedrosian (1)	18,652	29-20
50	Saturday, June 5	Montreal Expos	Atlanta–Fulton County Stadium	W, 2-1	R. Mahler (5-4)	Gullickson (3-5)	Bedrosian (2)	29,391	30-20
51	Sunday, June 6	Montreal Expos	Atlanta–Fulton County Stadium	L, 3-6	Reardon (3-0)	McWilliams (2-3)		18,898	30-21
52	Monday, June 7	@ Los Angeles Dodgers	Dodger Stadium	W, 4-3	P. Niekro (4-2)	Welch (5-4)	Bedrosian (3)	44,714	31-21
53	Tuesday, June 8	@ Los Angeles Dodgers	Dodger Stadium	W, 4-3	Hanna (3-0)	Hooton (1-3)	Garber (9)	33,153	32-21
54	Wednesday, June 9	@ Los Angeles Dodgers	Dodger Stadium	W, 11-5	R. Mahler (6-4)	Stewart (1-4)		39,325	33-21
55	Friday, June 11	@ San Francisco Giants	Candlestick Park	W, 5-3	Walk (5-4)	Chris (0-2)	Garber (10)	21,487	34-21
56	Saturday, June 12	@ San Francisco Giants	Candlestick Park	W, 10-5	P. Niekro (5-2)	Gale (2-5)	Hrabosky (2)	10,569	35-21
57	Sunday, June 13 (1)	@ San Francisco Giants	Candlestick Park	L, 1-2	R. Martin (2-3)	Dayley (2-3)	Minton (10)	27,521	35-22
58	Sunday, June 13 (2)			W, 5-1	Camp (4-3)	Hammaker (3-4)	Garber (11)		36-22
59	Monday, June 14	@ Houston Astros	Astrodome	L, 0-9	J. Niekro (6-4)	R. Mahler (6-5)		17,353	36-23
60	Tuesday, June 15	@ Houston Astros	Astrodome	W, 7-0	Walk (6-4)	Knepper (2-8)		17,837	37-23
61	Wednesday, June 16	@ Houston Astros	Astrodome	W, 5-4 (10 innings)	Garber (5-2)	Cappuzzello (0-1)		18,673	38-23
62	Friday, June 18	San Francisco Giants	Atlanta–Fulton County Stadium	W, 8-3	Dayley (3-3)	R. Martin (2-4)	Camp (5)	29,247	39-23
63	Saturday, June 19	San Francisco Giants	Atlanta–Fulton County Stadium	L, 4-9	Lavelle (4-2)	Garber (5-3)		30,497	39-24
64	Sunday, June 20	San Francisco Giants	Atlanta–Fulton County Stadium	L, 3-5	Laskey (6-4)	Walk (6-5)	Minton (11)	18,556	39-25
65	Monday, June 21	San Francisco Giants	Atlanta–Fulton County Stadium	W, 7-6	Camp (5-3)	Minton (3-4)		10,485	40-25
66	Tuesday, June 22	Los Angeles Dodgers	Atlanta–Fulton County Stadium	L, 1-4	Stewart (2-4)	Bedrosian (3-1)	S. Howe (4)	27,137	40-26
67	Wednesday, June 23	Los Angeles Dodgers	Atlanta–Fulton County Stadium	W, 7-2	R. Mahler (7-5)	Valenzuela (9-6)		33,212	41-26
68	Thursday, June 24	Los Angeles Dodgers	Atlanta–Fulton County Stadium	L, 3-5	Reuss (9-5)	Walk (6-6)	S. Howe (5)	31,303	41-27
69	Friday, June 25	@ Cincinnati Reds	Riverfront Stadium	W, 5-2	P. Niekro (6-2)	Berenyi (5-8)	Garber (12)	20,263	42-27
70	Saturday, June 26	@ Cincinnati Reds	Riverfront Stadium	L, 1-2	Seaver (4-8)	Dayley (3-4)	Hume (16)	26,561	42-28
71	Sunday, June 27	@ Cincinnati Reds	Riverfront Stadium	W, 2-0 (14 innings)	Garber (6-3)	Hume (1-3)	Hrabosky (3)	31,000	43-28
72	Monday, June 28	Houston Astros	Atlanta–Fulton County Stadium	L, 2-6	Ryan (7-8)	R. Mahler (7-6)		12,837	43-29
73	Tuesday, June 29	Houston Astros	Atlanta–Fulton County Stadium	W, 6-5 (11 innings)	Bedrosian (4-1)	LaCoss (3-3)		10,483	44-29
74	Wednesday, June 30	Houston Astros	Atlanta–Fulton County Stadium	W, 5-4	C. Diaz (1-0)	Knepper (2-9)		10,308	45-29

July

#	Date	Opponent	Site	Score	Win	Loss	Save	Attendance	Record
75	Friday, July 2	Cincinnati Reds	Atlanta–Fulton County Stadium	W, 6-4	Dayley (4-4)	Seaver (4-9)	Garber (13)	32,709	46-29
76	Saturday, July 3	Cincinnati Reds	Atlanta–Fulton County Stadium	W, 4-2	R. Mahler (8-6)	Soto (7-5)	Garber (14)	38,103	47-29
77	Sunday, July 4	Cincinnati Reds	Atlanta–Fulton County Stadium	W, 4-1	Walk (7-6)	Shirley (2-6)	Bedrosian (4)	48,905	48-29
78	Monday, July 5	Chicago Cubs	Atlanta–Fulton County Stadium	W, 7-5	Hrabosky (2-0)	L. Smith (1-5)	Garber (15)	19,169	49-29
79	Tuesday, July 6	Chicago Cubs	Atlanta–Fulton County Stadium	L, 2-7	Bird (5-8)	Dayley (4-5)	Hernández (7)	15,108	49-30
80	Wednesday, July 7	St. Louis Cardinals	Atlanta–Fulton County Stadium	W, 3-2	Camp (6-3)	Andújar (7-7)	Garber (16)	20,054	50-30
81	Thursday, July 8	St. Louis Cardinals	Atlanta–Fulton County Stadium	L, 2-5	Stuper (4-1)	R. Mahler (8-7)	Bair (4)	23,610	50-31
82	Friday, July 9	Pittsburgh Pirates	Atlanta–Fulton County Stadium	W, 6-4	C. Diaz (2-0)	Rhoden (5-8)	Bedrosian (5)	28,601	51-31
83	Saturday, July 10	Pittsburgh Pirates	Atlanta–Fulton County Stadium	L, 1-6	D. Robinson (10-3)	P. Niekro (6-3)		39,444	51-32
84	Sunday, July 11	Pittsburgh Pirates	Atlanta–Fulton County Stadium	L, 1-3	McWilliams (5-3)	Dayley (4-6)	Tekulve (12)	19,130	51-33
85	Thursday, July 15	@ Chicago Cubs	Wrigley Field	W, 11-4	P. Niekro (7-3)	Jenkins (6-10)		19,336	52-33
86	Friday, July 16	@ Chicago Cubs	Wrigley Field	L, 3-4 (10 innings)	Campbell (2-4)	Garber (6-4)		15,624	52-34
87	Saturday, July 17	@ Chicago Cubs	Wrigley Field	W, 9-4	Walk (8-6)	Noles (6-8)		23,302	53-34
88	Sunday, July 18	@ Chicago Cubs	Wrigley Field	W, 4-2	Camp (7-3)	Bird (6-9)		15,816	54-34
89	Monday, July 19	@ St. Louis Cardinals	Busch Memorial Stadium	W, 4-1	P. Niekro (8-3)	Andújar (7-9)	Garber (17)	23,000	55-34
90	Tuesday, July 20	@ St. Louis Cardinals	Busch Memorial Stadium	W, 8-6	Cowley (1-1)	Lahti (1-1)	Bedrosian (6)	20,894	56-34
91	Wednesday, July 21	@ St. Louis Cardinals	Busch Memorial Stadium	L, 0-8	Mura (7-7)	Walk (8-7)		19,899	56-35
92	Friday, July 23	@ Pittsburgh Pirates	Three Rivers Stadium	L, 0-6	Rhoden (6-8)	Camp (7-4)		22,722	56-36
93	Saturday, July 24	@ Pittsburgh Pirates	Three Rivers Stadium	W, 4-3	P. Niekro (9-3)	D. Robinson (10-5)	Garber (18)	26,790	57-36
94	Sunday, July 25	@ Pittsburgh Pirates	Three Rivers Stadium	L, 0-8	Candelaria (7-4)	R. Mahler (8-8)		22,565	57-37
95	Tuesday, July 27 (1)	San Diego Padres	Atlanta–Fulton County Stadium	W, 9-2	Walk (9-7)	Lollar (10-5)		32,151	5837
96	Tuesday, July 27 (2)			W, 8-6 (10 innings)	Bedrosian (5-1)	Lucas (0-7)			59-37
97	Wednesday, July 28	San Diego Padres	Atlanta–Fulton County Stadium	W, 8-6	P. Niekro (10-3)	Hawkins (1-2)	Garber (19)	22,574	60-37
98	Thursday, July 29	San Diego Padres	Atlanta–Fulton County Stadium	W, 6-2	Camp (8-4)	Welsh (5-5)	Diaz (1)	26,492	61-37
99	Friday, July 30 (1)	Los Angeles Dodgers	Atlanta–Fulton County Stadium	L, 9-10	Forster (4-5)	Bedrosian (5-2)	Howe (11)	47,787	61-38
100	Friday, July 30 (2)			L, 2-8	Welch (11-7)	Cowley (1-2)			61-39
101	Saturday, July 31	Los Angeles Dodgers	Atlanta–Fulton County Stadium	L, 0-3	Valenzuela (14-8)	Pérez (0-1)		46,694	61-40

August

#	Date	Opponent	Site	Score	Win	Loss	Save	Attendance	Record
102	Sunday, August 1	Los Angeles Dodgers	Atlanta–Fulton County Stadium	L, 4-9	Stewart (6-6)	Diaz (2-1)		33,957	61-41
103	Monday, August 2	San Francisco Giants	Atlanta–Fulton County Stadium	W, 7-3	Walk (10-7)	Breining (5-4)	Bedrosian (7)	15,018	62-41
104	Tuesday, August 3	San Francisco Giants	Atlanta–Fulton County Stadium	L, 3-6	Minton (8-4)	Garber (6-5)		13,607	62-42
105	Wednesday, August 4	San Francisco Giants	Atlanta–Fulton County Stadium	L, 2-3	Lavelle (5-5)	Bedrosian (5-3)	Minton (18)	13,607	62-43
106	Thursday, August 5	@ Los Angeles Dodgers	Dodger Stadium	L, 2-3 (10 innings)	Forster (5-5)	Garber (6-6)		49,607	62-44
107	Friday, August 6	@ Los Angeles Dodgers	Dodger Stadium	L, 4-5 (10 innings)	Howe (6-2)	Bedrosian (5-4)		51,423	62-45
108	Saturday, August 7	@ Los Angeles Dodgers	Dodger Stadium	L, 6-7 (11 innings)	Beckwith (2-0)	Bedrosian (5-5)		50,473	62-46
109	Sunday, August 8	@ Los Angeles Dodgers	Dodger Stadium	L, 0-2	Welch (13-7)	Camp (8-5)	Niedenfuer (6)	51,494	62-47
110	Monday, August 9	@ San Francisco Giants	Candlestick Park	L, 0-5	Barr (2-2)	Pérez (0-2)		29,846	62-48
111	Tuesday, August 10	@ San Francisco Giants	Candlestick Park	L, 2-3	Laskey (11-8)	Hrabosky (2-1)		19,390	62-49
112	Wednesday, August 11	@ San Francisco Giants	Candlestick Park	L, 6-8 (12 innings)	Breining (7-4)	Diaz (2-2)		22,940	62-50
113	Thursday, August 12	@ San Diego Padres	Jack Murphy Stadium	L, 8-2	Welsh (6-5)	Walk (10-8)		32,540	62-51
114	Friday, August 13	@ San Diego Padres	Jack Murphy Stadium	L, 4-7	Dravecky (3-1)	Camp (8-6)		33,968	62-52
115	Saturday, August 14	@ San Diego Padres	Jack Murphy Stadium	W, 6-5	Moore (1-0)	Eichelberger (6-10)	Garber (20)	36,187	63-52
116	Sunday, August 15	@ San Diego Padres	Jack Murphy Stadium	L, 5-6 (10 innings)	L. DeLeon (5-4)	Bedrosian (5-6)		21,740	63-53
117	Tuesday, August 17 (1)	Montreal Expos	Atlanta–Fulton County Stadium	L, 7-13	Lea (10-6)	Walk (10-9)		23,184	63-54
118	Tuesday, August 17 (2)			L,2-3 (10 innings)	Reardon (5-2)	R. Mahler (8-9)	Fryman (9)		63-55
119	Wednesday, August 18	Montreal Expos	Atlanta–Fulton County Stadium	L, 2-12	Gullickson (10-9)	Camp (8-7)		12,627	63-56
120	Thursday, August 19	Montreal Expos	Atlanta–Fulton County Stadium	W, 5-4	P. Niekro (11-3)	Fryman (7-3)	Garber (21)	12,205	64-56
121	Friday, August 20	New York Mets	Atlanta–Fulton County Stadium	W, 2-1 (10 innings)	Bedrosian (6-6)	Zachry (6-5)		33,144	65-56
122	Saturday, August 21	New York Mets	Atlanta–Fulton County Stadium	W, 6-5	Walk (11-9)	R. Jones (7-10)	Garber (22)	41,477	66-56
123	Sunday, August 22	New York Mets	Atlanta–Fulton County Stadium	W, 10-9	C. Diaz (3-2)	Orosco (2-9)	Garber (23)	20,466	67-56
124	Monday, August 23	Philadelphia Phillies	Atlanta–Fulton County Stadium	W, 4-3	Camp (9-7)	Ron Reed (3-4)		16,224	68-56
125	Tuesday, August 24	Philadelphia Phillies	Atlanta–Fulton County Stadium	W, 9-7	P. Niekro (12-3)	Carlton (16-9)	Garber (24)	22,709	69-56
126	Wednesday, August 25	Philadelphia Phillies	Atlanta–Fulton County Stadium	L, 9-11 (10 innings)	Ron Reed (4-4)	Garber (6-7)		23,955	69-57
127	Friday, August 27	@ New York Mets	Shea Stadium	W, 9-8	Moore (2-0)	Orosco (2-10)		14,133	70-57
128	Saturday, August 28	@ New York Mets	Shea Stadium	W, 4-3	Camp (10-7)	Scott (7-12)	Garber (25)	22,017	71-57
129	Sunday, August 29	@ New York Mets	Shea Stadium	W, 9-4	P. Niekro (13-3)	Hausman (1-2)	Bedrosian (8)	34,471	72-57
130	Monday, August 30 (1)	@ Philadelphia Phillies	Veterans Stadium	L, 1-6	Ruthven (10-10)	Pérez (0-3)		43,854	72-58
131	Monday, August 30 (2)			W, 11-9 (12 innings)	Bedrosian (7-6)	McGraw (2-3)	Moore (1)		73-58
132	Tuesday, August 31	@ Philadelphia Phillies	Veterans Stadium	W, 3-0	T. Boggs (2-0)	Farmer (2-5)	Garber (26)	29,380	74-58

September

#	Date	Opponent	Site	Score	Win	Loss	Save	Attendance	Record
133	Wednesday, September 1	@ Philadelphia Phillies	Veterans Stadium	W, 4-0	Camp (11-7)	Krukow (12-8)	Garber (27)	24,788	75-58
134	Friday, September 3	@ Montreal Expos	Olympic Stadium	W, 4-3	P. Niekro	Lea (11-8)	Bedrosian (9)	28,065	76-58
135	Saturday, September 4	@ Montreal Expos	Olympic Stadium	L, 1-4	Sanderson (9-11)	Pérez (0-4)	Reardon (22)	32,526	76-59
136	Sunday, September 5	@ Montreal Expos	Olympic Stadium	L, 1-2	S. Rogers	Garber (6-8)		56,807	76-60
137	Monday, September 6	San Francisco Giants	Atlanta–Fulton County Stadium	L, 2-8	Holland (5-3)	Moore (2-1)	Minton (25)	9,051	76-61
138	Tuesday, September 7	San Francisco Giants	Atlanta–Fulton County Stadium	L, 2-3	Barr (4-3)	Camp (11-8)	Minton (26)	7,523	76-62
139	Wednesday, September 8	Los Angeles Dodgers	Atlanta–Fulton County Stadium	W, 12-11 (10 innings)	Garber (7-8)	S. Howe (6-4)		24,853	77-62
140	Thursday, September 9	Los Angeles Dodgers	Atlanta–Fulton County Stadium	W, 10-3	R. Mahler	Valenzuela (17-12)	Bedrosian	35,362	78-62
141	Friday, September 10	Cincinnati Reds	Atlanta–Fulton County Stadium	W, 8-2	Pérez (1-4)	Shirley (6-12)		17,407	79-62
142	Saturday, September 11	Cincinnati Reds	Atlanta–Fulton County Stadium	L, 3-4	Soto (12-11)	T. Boggs (2-1)		20,966	79-63
143	Sunday, September 12	Cincinnati Reds	Atlanta–Fulton County Stadium	W, 4-3	Bedrosian (8-6)	Harris (2-6)		16,442	80-63
144	Monday, September 13	Houston Astros	Atlanta–Fulton County Stadium	L, 3-5	J. Niekro (15-10)	P. Niekro (14-4)		7,556	80-64
145	Tuesday, September 14	Houston Astros	Atlanta–Fulton County Stadium	L, 0-4	LaCoss (5-6)	R. Mahler (9-10)	LaCorte (5)	9,331	80-65
146	Wednesday, September 15	Houston Astros	Atlanta–Fulton County Stadium	L, 4-5	Ryan (15-11)	T. Boggs (2-2)	D. Smith (11)	11,422	80-66
147	Friday, September 17	@ Cincinnati Reds	Riverfront Stadium	L, 2-5	Soto (13-11)	Camp (11-9)		11,630	80-67
148	Saturday, September 18	@ Cincinnati Reds	Riverfront Stadium	W, 5-4	P. Niekro (15-4)	Pastore (8-11)	Garber (28)	14,121	81-67
149	Sunday, September 19	@ Cincinnati Reds	Riverfront Stadium	W, 6-1	Pérez (2-4)	Berenyi (8-18)		12,203	82-67
150	Monday, September 20	@ Houston Astros	Astrodome	L, 3-4	D. Smith (4-4)	Garber (7-9)		12,634	82-68
151	Tuesday, September 21	@ Houston Astros	Astrodome	L, 3-5	Ruhle (8-13)	Camp (11-10)	Knepper (1)	15,374	82-69
152	Wednesday, September 22	@ Houston Astros	Astrodome	L, 2-3	D. Smith (5-4)	Garber (7-10)	LaCorte (6)	16,821	82-70
153	Friday, September 24	San Diego Padres	Atlanta–Fulton County Stadium	W, 11-6	Dayley (5-6)	M. Griffin (0-1)	Bedrosian (11)	25,819	83-70
154	Saturday, September 25	San Diego Padres	Atlanta–Fulton County Stadium	W, 12-6	Moore (3-1)	Eichelberger (7-14)	Garber (29)	36,037	84-70
155	Sunday, September 26	San Diego Padres	Atlanta–Fulton County Stadium	L, 2-3	Lucas (1-10)	Camp (11-11)		38,941	84-71
156	Monday, September 27	@ San Francisco Giants	Candlestick Park	W, 7-0	P. Niekro (16-4)	R. Martin (7-9)		45,783	85-71
157	Tuesday, September 28	@ San Francisco Giants	Candlestick Park	W, 8-3	Pérez (3-4)	Laskey (13-12)		17,071	86-71
158	Wednesday, September 29	@ Los Angeles Dodgers	Dodger Stadium	W, 4-3 (12 innings)	Garber (8-10)	Forster (5-6)		45,757	87-71
159	Thursday, September 30	@ Los Angeles Dodgers	Dodger Stadium	L, 3-10	Hooton (4-7)	Camp (11-12)	Beckwith (1)	49,926	87-72

October

#	Date	Opponent	Site	Score	Win	Loss	Save	Attendance	Record
160	Friday, October 1	@ San Diego Padres	Jack Murphy Stadium	W, 4-0	P. Niekro (17-4)	Show (10-6)		14,050	88-72
161	Saturday, October 2	@ San Diego Padres	Jack Murphy Stadium	W, 4-2	Pérez (4-4)	Montefusco (10-11)	Garber (30)	43,077	89-72
162	Sunday, October 3	@ San Diego Padres	Jack Murphy Stadium	L, 1-5	Lollar (16-9)	Camp (11-13)	Dravecky (2)	19,412	89-73

== Player stats ==
=== Batting ===
==== Starters by position ====
Note: Pos = Position; G = Games played; AB = At bats; H = Hits; Avg. = Batting average; HR = Home runs; RBI = Runs batted in

Pos	Player	G	AB	H	Avg.	HR	RBI
C	Bruce Benedict	118	386	95	.246	3	44
1B	Chris Chambliss	157	534	144	.270	20	86
2B	Glenn Hubbard	145	532	132	.248	9	59
3B	Bob Horner	140	499	130	.261	32	97
SS	Rafael Ramírez	157	609	169	.278	10	52
LF	Rufino Linares	77	191	57	.298	2	17
CF	Dale Murphy	162	598	168	.281	36	109
RF	Claudell Washington	150	563	150	.266	16	80

==== Other batters ====
Note: G = Games played; AB = At bats; H = Hits; Avg. = Batting average; HR = Home runs; RBI = Runs batted in

Player	G	AB	H	Avg.	HR	RBI
Jerry Royster	108	261	77	.291	2	25
Brett Butler	89	240	52	.217	0	7
Terry Harper	48	150	43	.287	2	16
Larry Whisenton	84	143	34	.238	4	17
Biff Pocoroba	56	120	33	.275	2	22
Bob Watson	57	114	28	.246	5	22
Matt Sinatro	37	81	11	.136	1	4
Randy Johnson	27	46	11	.239	0	6
Ken Smith	48	41	12	.293	0	3
Bob Porter	24	27	3	.111	0	0
Larry Owen	2	3	1	.333	0	0
Paul Runge	4	2	0	.000	0	0
Paul Zuvella	2	1	0	.000	0	0
Albert Hall	5	0	0	----	0	0

=== Pitching ===
==== Starting pitchers ====
Note: G = Games pitched; IP = Innings pitched; W = Wins; L = Losses; ERA = Earned run average; SO = Strikeouts

Player	G	IP	W	L	ERA	SO
Phil Niekro	35	234.1	17	4	3.61	144
Rick Mahler	39	205.1	9	10	4.21	105
Bob Walk	32	164.1	11	9	4.87	84
Tommy Boggs	10	46.1	2	2	3.30	29

==== Other pitchers ====
Note: G = Games pitched; IP = Innings pitched; W = Wins; L = Losses; ERA = Earned run average; SO = Strikeouts

Player	G	IP	W	L	ERA	SO
Rick Camp	51	177.1	11	13	3.65	58
Pascual Pérez	16	79.1	4	4	3.06	29
Ken Dayley	20	71.1	5	6	4.54	34
Joe Cowley	17	52.1	1	2	4.47	27

==== Relief pitchers ====
Note: G = Games pitched; W = Wins; L = Losses; SV = Saves; ERA = Earned run average; SO = Strikeouts

Player	G	W	L	SV	ERA	SO
Gene Garber	69	8	10	30	2.34	68
Steve Bedrosian	64	8	6	11	2.42	123
Al Hrabosky	31	2	1	3	5.54	20
Larry McWilliams	27	2	3	0	6.21	24
Preston Hanna	20	3	0	0	3.75	17
Carlos Diaz	19	3	2	1	4.62	16
Donnie Moore	16	3	1	1	4.23	17
Jose Alvarez	7	0	0	0	4.70	6
Tom Hausman	3	0	0	0	4.91	2

== National League Championship Series ==
=== Game 1: Take 1 ===
October 6, Busch Stadium

Game 1 was a wash – literally. The Braves led 1–0 behind Phil Niekro and were two outs from an official game when the umpire stopped it. When the rain did not subside, the game was canceled. Game 1 began from the start the following night in a match-up of the volatile Braves starter Pascual Pérez and longtime Cardinal starter Bob Forsch.

=== Game 1: Take 2 ===
October 7, Busch Stadium

Team	1	2	3	4	5	6	7	8	9	R	H	E
Atlanta	0	0	0	0	0	0	0	0	0	0	3	0
St. Louis	0	0	1	0	0	5	0	1	X	7	13	1
W: Bob Forsch (1–0) L: Pascual Pérez (0–1) SV: None
HRs: ATL – None STL – None

=== Game 2 ===
October 9, Busch Stadium

Team	1	2	3	4	5	6	7	8	9	R	H	E
Atlanta	0	0	2	0	1	0	0	0	0	3	6	0
St. Louis	1	0	0	0	0	1	0	1	1	4	9	1
W: Bruce Sutter (1–0) L: Gene Garber (0–1) SV: None
HRs: ATL – None STL – None

=== Game 3 ===
October 10, Atlanta–Fulton County Stadium

Team	1	2	3	4	5	6	7	8	9	R	H	E
St. Louis	0	4	0	0	1	0	0	0	1	6	12	0
Atlanta	0	0	0	0	0	0	2	0	0	2	6	1
W: Joaquín Andújar (1–0) L: Rick Camp (0–1) SV: Bruce Sutter (1)
HRs: ATL – None STL – Willie McGee (1)

== Awards and honors ==
- Dale Murphy, National League Most Valuable Player
- Dale Murphy, Gold Glove Award (NL OF), 1982
- Dale Murphy, Silver Slugger Award (NL OF): 1982
- Joe Torre, Associated Press NL Manager of the Year

1982 Major League Baseball All-Star Game

- Dale Murphy, outfield

== Farm system ==
Level	Team	League	Manager
AAA	Richmond Braves	International League	Eddie Haas
AA	Savannah Braves	Southern League	Andy Gilbert
A	Durham Bulls	Carolina League	Bobby Dews
A	Anderson Braves	South Atlantic League	Brian Snitker
Rookie	Pulaski Braves	Appalachian League	Rick Albert
Rookie	GCL Braves	Gulf Coast League	Pedro González
