= 1984 Atlanta Braves season =

1984 Atlanta Braves
- League: National League
- Division: West
- Ballpark: Atlanta–Fulton County Stadium
- City: Atlanta
- Record: 80–82 (.494)
- Divisional place: 2nd
- Owners: Ted Turner
- General managers: John Mullen
- Managers: Joe Torre
- Television: WTBS; Superstation WTBS
- Radio: WSB (Ernie Johnson, Pete Van Wieren, Skip Caray, John Sterling)

The 1984 Atlanta Braves season was the 19th season in Atlanta along with the 114th overall.

== Offseason ==
- October 4, 1983: Tommy Boggs was released by the Braves.
- October 21, 1983: Brett Butler, Brook Jacoby, and Rick Behenna were sent by the Braves to the Cleveland Indians to complete an earlier deal (the Braves traded players to be named later to the Indians for Len Barker) made on August 28, 1983.

== Regular season ==
The 1984 Braves third season with Joe Torre at the helm was a disappointing one. Despite a winning record throughout most of the season they finished the campaign with an 80–82 mark, tied for second with the Houston Astros, 12 games behind the San Diego Padres.

Atlanta stumbled out of the gate with a 2–7 mark on April 13 and were six games out of first place. The Braves had a 6–11 record on April 25 but won three in a row and later won eight of nine to go above the .500 mark for the first time in 1984. They were 18–15 on May 13, tied for third and two games out of first.

On May 24 Atlanta lost a double-header to the Cubs 10–7, 7–5 to drop to the .500 mark at 21–21. Atlanta rebounded to win 13 of its next 15 games to surge into first place with a 34–23 mark on June 7. The Braves were 32-16 since April 14 and were in first place by 1½ games. The season was beginning to look good for Atlanta.

Unfortunately for the Braves this would prove to be the high water mark for the season. Atlanta lost five in a row from June 8 to 12 to fall into second place, 3½ games out of first. They were never to be in first place again in 1984.

June 16, 1984: The Braves were playing the Cincinnati Reds in Atlanta. Mario Soto threw several brushback pitches at Braves slugger Claudell Washington. Washington tossed his bat in the direction of Soto, appeared to go out to retrieve it, but instead walked toward the mound. Umpire Lanny Harris attempted to restrain Washington. Harris was thrown to the ground. Soto used the distraction to punch Washington. Several of Washington's teammates attempted to hold Washington to the ground. While they were doing that, Soto fired the baseball into the crowd of players, striking Braves coach Joe Pignatano. He was suspended three games for this incident; Washington received a five-game suspension for shoving (umpire) Lanny Harris. (Both Soto and Washington were ejected from the game.)

On June 20 the Braves were 39–29 and in second place, 1½ games out of first. By the end of June they were 43–35 and three games out of first. July would prove to be tougher for the Braves however. Atlanta went 5–12 to begin the month of July. On July 19 the Braves owned a 48–47 record and were seven games out of first and still in second place. It was growing more obvious that this wouldn't be the magical season fans had wished it would be. Atlanta was 8½ games out of first on the last day of July.

On August 3 the Braves were six games over the .500 mark with a 57–51 record following a 2–1 win over the Giants. The league leading San Diego Padres lost that day and the Braves closed within 7½ games of the lead. The Braves were still hopeful of a late season surge but it appeared that might not happen.

After August 3 things turned rotten on the Braves. From August 4 to September 9 the Braves posted a 12–23 record that reduced them to 69–74 with an eleven-game deficit with 19 games to play. The Braves had also slipped to third place. The "pennant race" was over.

=== Brawl with the San Diego Padres ===
The Braves' regular season is most remembered for an August 12 game at Atlanta–Fulton County Stadium against the San Diego Padres. From the start, the game was tense and erupted into a series of brawls which ended with a total of 13 ejections and 5 arrests. All fans who participated in the taunting and brawls were detained and arrested. The Braves eventually won the game by a score of 5–3. Fines and suspensions were issued four days later on August 16 to Williams ($10,000, ten days) and Summers, Brown, Torre ($1,000), Perry ($700), Bedrosian ($600) and Mahler ($700) who each received three-day suspensions. Virgil, Krol, Whitson, Booker, Lefferts, Bevacqua, Flannery, Nettles and Gossage for the Padres (all undisclosed) and Moore ($350) and Pérez ($300) for the Braves were all fined but not suspended.

=== Season standings ===
NL West
Team	W	L	Pct.	GB	Home	Road
San Diego Padres	92	70	.568	—	48‍–‍33	44‍–‍37
Atlanta Braves	80	82	.494	12	38‍–‍43	42‍–‍39
Houston Astros	80	82	.494	12	43‍–‍38	37‍–‍44
Los Angeles Dodgers	79	83	.488	13	40‍–‍41	39‍–‍42
Cincinnati Reds	70	92	.432	22	39‍–‍42	31‍–‍50
San Francisco Giants	66	96	.407	26	35‍–‍46	31‍–‍50

=== Record vs. opponents ===
1984 National League record Sources:
Team	ATL	CHC	CIN	HOU	LAD	MON	NYM	PHI	PIT	SD	SF	STL
Atlanta	—	3–9	13–5	12–6	6–12	5–7	4–8	7–5	8–4	7–11	10–8	5–7
Chicago	9–3	—	7–5	6–6	7–5	10–7	12–6	9–9	8–10	6–6	9–3	13–5
Cincinnati	5–13	5–7	—	8–10	7–11	7–5	3–9	5–7	7–5	7–11	12–6	4–8
Houston	6–12	6–6	10–8	—	9–9	7–5	4–8	6–6	6–6	6–12	12–6	8–4
Los Angeles	12–6	5–7	7–11	9–9	—	6–6	3–9	3–9	4–8	10–8	10–8	6–6
Montreal	7–5	7–10	5–7	5–7	6–6	—	7–11	11–7	7–11	7–5	7–5	9–9
New York	8–4	6–12	9–3	8–4	9–3	11–7	—	10–8	12–6	6–6	4–8	7–11
Philadelphia	5-7	9–9	7–5	6–6	9–3	7–11	8–10	—	7–11	7–5	8–4	8–10
Pittsburgh	4–8	10–8	5–7	6–6	8–4	11–7	6–12	11–7	—	4–8	6–6	4–14
San Diego	11–7	6–6	11–7	12–6	8–10	5–7	6–6	5–7	8–4	—	13–5	7–5
San Francisco	8–10	3–9	6–12	6–12	8–10	5–7	8–4	4–8	6–6	5–13	—	7–5
St. Louis	7–5	5–13	8–4	4–8	6–6	9–9	11–7	10–8	14–4	5–7	5–7	—

=== Notable transactions ===
- April 24, 1984: Biff Pocoroba was released by the Braves.
- June 4, 1984: Tom Glavine was drafted by the Braves in the 2nd round of the 1984 Major League Baseball draft.
- June 15, 1984: Ken Dayley and Mike Jorgensen were traded by the Braves to the St. Louis Cardinals for Ken Oberkfell.

=== Roster ===
1984 Atlanta Braves
Roster
Pitchers: 39 Len Barker; 32 Steve Bedrosian; 48 Tony Brizzolara; 37 Rick Camp; 30 Ken Dayley; 49 Jeff Dedmon; 33 Pete Falcone; 51 Terry Forster; 26 Gene Garber; 42 Rick Mahler; 29 Craig McMurtry; 31 Donnie Moore; 47 Mike Payne; 27 Pascual Pérez; 34 Zane Smith	Catchers: 20 Bruce Benedict; 14 Matt Sinatro; 25 Alex Treviño; Infielders: 10 Chris Chambliss; 5 Bob Horner; 17 Glenn Hubbard; 6 Randy Johnson; 11 Mike Jorgensen; 24 Ken Oberkfell; 28 Gerald Perry; 16 Rafael Ramírez; 1 Jerry Royster; 12 Paul Runge; 8 Bob Watson; 18 Paul Zuvella	Outfielders: 2 Albert Hall; 19 Terry Harper; 7 Brad Komminsk; 11 Rufino Linares; 3 Dale Murphy; 30 Milt Thompson; 15 Claudell Washington; Other batters: 4 Biff Pocoroba	Manager: 9 Joe Torre; Coaches: 23 Tommie Aaron; 55 Luke Appling; 45 Bob Gibson; 36 Eddie Haas; 53 Dal Maxvill; 52 Joe Pignatano; 54 Rube Walker

== Player stats ==
=== Batting ===
==== Starters by position ====
Note: Pos = Position; G = Games played; AB = At bats; H = Hits; Avg. = Batting average; HR = Home runs; RBI = Runs batted in

Pos	Player	G	AB	H	Avg.	HR	RBI
C	Bruce Benedict	95	300	67	.223	4	25
1B	Chris Chambliss	135	389	100	.257	9	44
2B	Glenn Hubbard	120	397	93	.234	9	43
SS	Rafael Ramírez	145	591	157	.266	2	48
3B	Randy Johnson	91	294	82	.279	5	30
LF	Gerald Perry	122	347	92	.265	7	47
CF	Dale Murphy	162	607	176	.290	36	100
RF	Claudell Washington	120	416	119	.286	17	61

==== Other batters ====
Note: G = Games played; AB = At bats; H = Hits; Avg. = Batting average; HR = Home runs; RBI = Runs batted in

Player	G	AB	H	Avg.	HR	RBI
Brad Komminsk	90	301	61	.203	8	36
Alex Treviño	79	266	65	.244	3	28
Jerry Royster	81	227	47	.207	1	21
Ken Oberkfell	50	172	40	.233	1	10
Albert Hall	87	142	37	.261	1	9
Bob Horner	32	113	31	.274	3	19
Terry Harper	40	102	16	.157	0	8
Milt Thompson	25	99	30	.303	2	4
Paul Runge	28	90	24	.267	0	3
Bob Watson	49	85	18	.212	2	12
Rufino Linares	34	58	12	.207	1	10
Mike Jorgensen	31	26	7	.269	0	5
Paul Zuvella	11	25	5	.200	0	1
Matt Sinatro	2	4	0	.000	0	0
Biff Pocoroba	4	2	0	.000	0	0

=== Pitching ===
==== Starting pitchers ====
Note: G = Games pitched; IP = Innings pitched; W = Wins; L = Losses; ERA = Earned run average; SO = Strikeouts

Player	G	IP	W	L	ERA	SO
Rick Mahler	38	222.0	13	10	3.12	106
Pascual Pérez	30	211.2	14	8	3.74	145
Craig McMurtry	37	183.1	9	17	4.32	99
Rick Camp	31	148.2	8	6	3.27	89
Len Barker	21	126.1	7	8	3.85	95
Zane Smith	3	20.0	1	0	2.25	16
Ken Dayley	4	18.2	0	3	5.30	10

==== Other pitchers ====
Note" G = Games pitched; IP = Innings pitched; W = Wins; L = Losses; ERA = Earned run average; SO = Strikeouts

Player	G	IP	W	L	ERA	SO
Pete Falcone	35	120.0	5	7	4.13	55
Tony Brizzolara	10	29.0	1	2	5.28	17
Mike Payne	3	5.2	0	1	6.35	3

==== Relief pitchers ====
Note: G = Games pitched; W = Wins; L = Losses; SV = Saves; ERA = Earned run average; SO = Strikeouts

Player	G	W	L	SV	ERA	SO
Donnie Moore	47	4	5	16	2.94	47
Gene Garber	62	3	6	11	3.06	55
Jeff Dedmon	54	4	3	4	3.78	51
Steve Bedrosian	40	9	6	11	2.37	81
Terry Forster	25	2	0	5	2.70	10

== Farm system ==
Level	Team	League	Manager
AAA	Richmond Braves	International League	Eddie Haas and Bobby Dews
AA	Greenville Braves	Southern League	Bobby Dews and Leo Mazzone
A	Durham Bulls	Carolina League	Brian Snitker
A	Anderson Braves	South Atlantic League	Rick Albert
Rookie	Pulaski Braves	Appalachian League	Buddy Bailey
Rookie	GCL Braves	Gulf Coast League	Pedro González

== See also ==
- Johnson, Lloyd; Wolff, Miles, eds. (1997). The Encyclopedia of Minor League Baseball (2nd ed.). Durham, North Carolina: Baseball America. ISBN 978-0-9637189-8-3.
