= 1982 National League Championship Series =

14th edition of Major League Baseball's National League Championship Series

Team (Wins)	Managers	Season
St. Louis Cardinals (3)	Whitey Herzog	92–70, .568, GA: 3
Atlanta Braves (0)	Joe Torre	89–73, .549, GA: 1
- Dates: October 6–10
- MVP: Darrell Porter (St. Louis)
- Umpires: Billy Williams (crew chief); Bob Engel; Harry Wendelstedt; Bruce Froemming; Dutch Rennert; Paul Runge

Broadcast
- Television: ABC; KSDK (Cardinals' broadcast)
- TV announcers: ABC: Al Michaels, Howard Cosell (Games 1, 3) and Tommy Lasorda; KSDK: Jay Randolph and Mike Shannon
- Radio: CBS
- Radio announcers: Jack Buck and Jerry Coleman

The 1982 National League Championship Series was a best-of-five playoff series in Major League Baseball’s 1982 postseason played between the St. Louis Cardinals and the Atlanta Braves from October 6 to 10. It was the 14th NLCS. The Cardinals swept the series in 3 games, and went on to win the World Series over the Milwaukee Brewers in seven games.

== Background ==
Despite their history as the National League's most successful franchise – the second-most World Series titles in baseball behind the New York Yankees — this was the Cardinals first postseason appearance since the league went to divisional play. Their last postseason trip had been to the 1968 World Series when they lost to the Detroit Tigers — the last year before divisional play. The Atlanta Braves were making their first postseason appearance since 1969, the first year of divisional play. The Cardinals were led by Gold Glove first baseman and solid hitter Keith Hernandez, while the Braves were led by Dale Murphy, who was later named the season's MVP. The Cardinals had been the first team to clinch a playoff berth on September 27 while the Braves were the last to make the playoffs, clinching the West on October 3 when the Giants beat the Dodgers when Joe Morgan's three-run homer late in the seventh inning helped seal a 5–3 victory to deny the Dodgers from reaching the playoffs. The day before Morgan's three-run home run, the Giants were eliminated by the Dodgers, making it the first and only time the two rivals eliminated each other in the same season.

On a side note, Atlanta's manager Joe Torre and two of his coaches Bob Gibson and Dal Maxvill were known for playing for the opposing St. Louis Cardinal team while Cardinal coach Red Schoendienst previously played for the Braves and Cardinal coach Hub Kittle previously managed in the Braves organization.

For Torre, this was his first attempt at postseason baseball, after 23 years on non-competitive teams as a player and manager. Throughout his career, Torre was seen as unlucky to just miss competitive windows by teams. As a player debuting in 1960, Torre just missed the Braves' great teams in the late 1950s and was traded to St. Louis just before Atlanta's 1969 season, where they made the postseason for the first time since 1958. 1968 also represented St. Louis' last postseason appearance until 1982, which saw Torre just miss out again after being traded there in 1969. This bit on bad fortunate would change when Torre later went on to manage one of the greatest modern dynasties in MLB, winning four World Series in five seasons with the Yankees from 1996 to 2000.

This was the first year since the inaugural NLCS in 1969 to not feature the Reds, Pirates, Phillies, or Dodgers.

== Summary ==
=== Atlanta Braves vs. St. Louis Cardinals ===
St. Louis won the series, 3–0.

Game	Date	Score	Location	Time	Attendance
1	October 7	Atlanta Braves – 0, St. Louis Cardinals – 7	Busch Stadium (II)	2:25	53,008
2	October 9	Atlanta Braves – 3, St. Louis Cardinals – 4	Busch Stadium (II)	2:46	53,408
3	October 10	St. Louis Cardinals – 6, Atlanta Braves – 2	Atlanta–Fulton County Stadium	2:51	52,173

== Game summaries ==
=== Game 1 (postponed) ===
Wednesday, October 6, 1982, at Busch Stadium (II) in St. Louis, Missouri

In the top of the first inning, Braves leadoff man Claudell Washington hit Cardinals starter Joaquin Andujar's second pitch to left-center for a double. Rafael Ramírez then hit into a sacrifice, and with two out, Chris Chambliss singled through the middle for the 1–0 lead.

In the bottom of the first, the Cardinals got Ken Oberkfell and Keith Hernandez to both hit singles, but neither scored.

In the second, Andjuar only gave up one single to Glenn Hubbard.

The Cardinals threatened in the third. Tom Herr singled, but was thrown out trying to steal second base, wasting Lonnie Smith's triple. The Cardinals did not score.

In the bottom of the fifth, Ozzie Smith grounded out and Andujar was at bat when plate umpire Billy Williams called the game on account of rain with the Braves leading 1-0 and two outs from an official game. Under the rules at the time, the entire game was wiped out. Braves manager Joe Torre complained, saying, "But I feel that any postseason game should be finished, the next day or whenever it is."

This situation is no longer possible after 2009 rule changes that state once a game starts, it will be played to its conclusion and if necessary, would be suspended, not be a rained out game. Since 2020, in the regular season, once the first pitch is made, a game can only be suspended if it does not reach official game status or is a tied game. Under current rules, the game would have restarted with the Braves leading 1-0, with one out in the bottom of the fifth inning, and Andujar at bat (or a pinch-hitter).

A new Game 1 began from the start the following night in a match-up of the volatile Braves starter Pascual Pérez and longtime Cardinal starter Bob Forsch.

=== Game 1: Take 2 ===
Thursday, October 7, 1982, at Busch Stadium (II) in St. Louis, Missouri

Team	1	2	3	4	5	6	7	8	9	R	H	E
Atlanta	0	0	0	0	0	0	0	0	0	0	3	0
St. Louis	0	0	1	0	0	5	0	1	x	7	13	1
WP: Bob Forsch (1–0) LP: Pascual Pérez (0–1)

The new Game 1 was scoreless through two innings. In the bottom of the third, Willie McGee tripled and scored on Ozzie Smith's sacrifice fly to center. It stayed 1–0 until the sixth when the floodgates opened and the Cardinals scored five runs to finish off Perez and the Braves for the evening. Three straight singles by Lonnie Smith, Keith Hernandez, and George Hendrick chased Perez and made it 2–0 with two on and nobody out. Brought in to put out the fire, Steve Bedrosian walked Darrell Porter to load the bases and gave up a single to McGee that scored Hernandez. Ozzie Smith's single scored Hendrick and Porter scored on a sacrifice fly by Forsch. A wild pitch advanced the runners, and a Ken Oberkfell single made it 6–0 Cardinals. Donnie Moore replaced Bedrosian and ended the inning, but the game was as good as over.

The Cardinals added a cosmetic run in the eighth scored by Forsch on a sacrifice fly. The 7–0 win gave the Cardinals a 1–0 lead in the best-of-five series. Forsch went the distance and only yielded three hits while Perez got the loss.

=== Game 2 ===
Saturday, October 9, 1982, at Busch Stadium (II) in St. Louis, Missouri

Team	1	2	3	4	5	6	7	8	9	R	H	E
Atlanta	0	0	2	0	1	0	0	0	0	3	6	0
St. Louis	1	0	0	0	0	1	0	1	1	4	9	1
WP: Bruce Sutter (1–0) LP: Gene Garber (0–1)

After another rainout the night before, an exciting contest unfolded at Busch Stadium in Game 2 with the Braves sending Phil Niekro against John Stuper. The Cardinals took a 1–0 lead in the bottom of the second when Ken Oberkfell scored on a wild pitch. The Braves answered in the top of the third when Bruce Benedict walked, went to second on a Niekro bunt, and scored the Braves' first run of the series that counted when Rafael Ramirez hit a single that he followed by scoring on a three-base error to put the Braves in front for the first time, 2–1. Niekro helped himself in the fifth when Glenn Hubbard singled, Benedict doubled, and Niekro's sacrifice fly gave the Braves a two-run lead. In the bottom of that same inning, Keith Hernandez singled and scored on Darrell Porter's double to make it 3–2 Atlanta. In the eighth, Porter walked, went to third on a George Hendrick single, and scored to tie it when Willie McGee hit into a fielder's choice that forced Hendrick at second. With the score tied, the Cardinals won in the bottom of the ninth when David Green singled, went to second on a bunt by Tommy Herr, and scored on a single by Oberkfell. The last at-bat win gave the Cardinals a 2–0 lead heading to Atlanta. Bruce Sutter got the win and Braves ace reliever Gene Garber got the loss.

=== Game 3 ===
Sunday, October 10, 1982, at Atlanta–Fulton County Stadium in Atlanta, Georgia

Team	1	2	3	4	5	6	7	8	9	R	H	E
St. Louis	0	4	0	0	1	0	0	0	1	6	12	0
Atlanta	0	0	0	0	0	0	2	0	0	2	6	1
WP: Joaquín Andújar (1–0) LP: Rick Camp (0–1) Sv: Bruce Sutter (1); Home runs: STL: Willie McGee (1); ATL: None

In a must-win game, the Braves sent Rick Camp to the hill and the Cardinals countered with the sometimes volatile and often entertaining Joaquín Andújar. There were no runs in the first, but in the second, the Cardinals clinched the series. Hernandez singled, Porter walked, Hendrick singled to score Hernandez, and Willie McGee hit his second triple of the series to score two more runs. When Ozzie Smith singled to make it 4–0, Camp was history and for all intents and purposes, so were the Braves. In the fifth, Tommy Herr doubled and scored on a Hernandez single to make it 5–0. Facing elimination, the Braves fought back valiantly. Claudell Washington and Bob Horner both singled. Faced with the prospect of a big inning, manager Joe Torre pulled Washington and replaced him with the faster Terry Harper. But the next hitter, Chris Chambliss hit into a double play that scored Harper and made it 5–1, but took the Braves out of the inning since the next hitter was their star, Dale Murphy. Had Chambliss hit safely, a Murphy homer would have made it 5–4. Instead, Murphy singled with two outs, went to second on a wild pitch by Andujar, and scored on Glenn Hubbard's single. The scoring continued in the ninth when McGee drilled a home run off reliever Gene Garber to end the scoring at 6–2. Bruce Sutter got the save and Camp the loss.

The win thrust the Cardinals into the 1982 World Series against another beer town team, the Milwaukee Brewers.

== Composite box ==
1982 NLCS (3–0): St. Louis Cardinals over Atlanta Braves

Team	1	2	3	4	5	6	7	8	9	R	H	E
St. Louis Cardinals	1	4	1	0	1	6	0	2	2	17	34	2
Atlanta Braves	0	0	2	0	1	0	2	0	0	5	15	1
Total attendance: 158,589 Average attendance: 52,863

== Broadcasting ==
This series was televised by ABC Sports in the United States, running concurrently with the network's broadcast of the ALCS.

KSDK in St. Louis, the Cardinals' over-the-air rights holder and that city's NBC affiliate, produced a local broadcast of this series. The Braves' TV outlet, independent station WTBS in Atlanta, attempted to produce coverage for its audience but was blocked from doing so by ABC and Major League Baseball. Though MLB rules of the time allowed for local telecasts of League Championship Series games, WTBS's status as a cable- and satellite-delivered superstation would have had its potential telecasts of the NLCS competing with ABC for national viewers. WTBS sought legal relief against MLB and ABC, but a final ruling in a Philadelphia federal court upheld MLB's decision to bar WTBS from producing its own NLCS games.

When a new television rights contract between Major League Baseball, ABC and NBC went into effect at the start of the 1984 season, coverage of League Championship Series games became network-exclusive, with locally produced broadcasts no longer permitted. The new contract also ended the long-standing practice of allowing local team broadcasters to simulcast network coverage of the World Series.

== Aftermath ==
The 1983 season represented more promise and heartbreak for Atlanta. The Braves were 71–46 on Saturday, August 13, after beating the Los Angeles Dodgers 8–7 on a Bob Watson walk-off home run in the bottom of the ninth. The Braves were 6 1/2 games ahead of the Dodgers at this point and things were looking good for them. However, during next series with the Padres, the Braves would lose their cleanup hitter Bob Horner to a season-ending wrist injury. Horner was batting .303 with 20 homers at that point and his loss would prove to be a disaster for the team. After Horner's injury the Braves spiraled the rest of the way in August and early September and were soon overtaken by the Dodgers. With a chance to get within a one game of the now first-place Dodgers, Atlanta led Los Angeles 6–3 going into the bottom of the ninth during an afternoon game on at Dodger Stadium on Sunday, September 11. However, in what turned out to be one of the games of the season, Los Angeles rallied to win 7–6, thanks to an R.J. Reynolds' walk-off suicide squeeze, thus extending their division lead to three games. This effectively won the Dodgers the NL West, as the Braves were not able to make up the three games in the standings the rest of the way. Atlanta did not seriously compete again for the NL West until 1991, where they would this time best Los Angeles in a close race to the last weekend of the season.

The collapse of the Braves '83 season was not the fault of Dale Murphy, who hit .327 in September with 10 home runs. He was rewarded with his second straight National League MVP award, solidifying himself as one of the best hitters in the early 1980s.

From 1991 to 2005 (excluding the strike-shortened 1994 season), the Braves made the postseason every year. In comparison, in their first 24 years in Atlanta (1966–1990), the Braves made the postseason just twice (1969 and 1982) and were swept both times.

Joe Torre would later manage the Cardinals from 1990 to 1995, before leading the Yankees to four World Series championships from 1996 to 2007, including defeating the Braves in six games in the 1996 Fall Classic. For his success with the Yankees, Torre was inducted into the National Baseball Hall of Fame in 2014.

The Braves would avenge their 1982 National League Championship Series loss 14 years later during the 1996 National League Championship Series when Atlanta became just the sixth team in MLB history to come back from a 3–1 series deficit in the postseason. The two teams met again three other times during the postseason; in the 2000 National League Division Series, 2012 National League Wild Card Game, and 2019 National League Division Series, with the Cardinals winning all three match-ups.
