= Biff Pocoroba =

American baseball player (1953–2020)

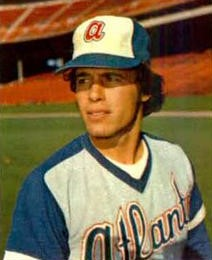
- Catcher
- Born: July 25, 1953; Burbank, California, U.S.
- Died: May 24, 2020 (aged 66); Gwinnett County, Georgia, U.S.
- Batted: Switch Threw: Right

MLB debut
- April 25, 1975, for the Atlanta Braves

Last MLB appearance
- July 25, 1984, for the Atlanta Braves

MLB statistics
- Batting average: .257
- Home runs: 21
- Runs batted in: 172
- Stats at Baseball Reference

Teams
- Atlanta Braves (1975–1984)

Career highlights and awards
- All-Star (1978)

Biff Benedict Pocoroba (July 25, 1953 – May 24, 2020) was an American baseball catcher who played ten seasons in Major League Baseball (MLB). He played his entire career for the Atlanta Braves from 1975 to 1984. Although his primary position was catcher, Pocoroba played at third base as well.

Pocoroba was drafted by the Atlanta Braves in 1971 and played for four of their minor league affiliates until 1975, when the Braves promoted him to the major leagues. There, he served as the team's backup catcher and was selected as an All-Star in 1978. After shoulder injuries resulted in him losing playing time, he played his last game on April 20, 1984. He subsequently started a sausage business outside Atlanta.

== Early life ==
Pocoroba was born in Burbank, California, on July 25, 1953. He was the second of Victor and Ida Pocoroba's seven children. He attended Canoga Park High School, where he displaced Bob Adams – a fellow future major league player – as the school team's starting catcher in 1969. He was also selected as an All-City player.

Pocoroba graduated from Canoga Park High in 1971. He was subsequently drafted by the Atlanta Braves in the 17th round of that year's MLB draft.

== Professional career ==
=== Minor leagues ===
Pocoroba began his professional baseball career with the Wytheville Braves, a minor league baseball team that were members of the Appalachian League. He had just one plate appearance with the Richmond Braves in 1972, before spending the rest of the year with the Greenwood Braves. There, he batted .259 with seven home runs and 29 runs batted in (RBIs) in 42 games played, enough to earn him a promotion to the Class-AA Savannah Braves of the Southern League in the following season. He played 193 games for that team from 1973 to 1974. Although he hit three fewer home runs and one fewer RBI in his second season, he managed to raise his batting average from .234 to .311.

During his stint in the minor leagues, Pocoroba was noted for demonstrating good defense together with "strong on-base skills". As a rookie, Pocoroba attracted attention during spring training in 1975 by throwing out 11 straight would-be base stealers.

=== Atlanta Braves (1975–1984) ===
Pocoroba made his Major League Baseball debut on April 25, 1975, at the age of 21, entering as a defensive replacement in a 5–3 loss to the San Diego Padres at San Diego Stadium. He endeared himself with fans despite the Braves performing poorly during his tenure there. This was partly attributed to "the sound of his name". His best season was in 1977, when he achieved a career-best 113 games played, a .290 batting average, eight home runs, 24 doubles, and 44 RBIs. It was the only season in his career in which he played over 100 games. Defensively, he finished second in the National League (NL) in passed balls (15) and stolen bases allowed (103). However, he compensated for this by recording the third highest range factor per nine innings (6.99) as catcher, while finishing fifth in assists (78) and fielding percentage (.989) at his position and catching the fifth highest number of baserunners stealing (52). He also earned the NL Player of the Week Award for the week of May 16 to 22 that same year. During that period, he batted .555 with two home runs and seven RBIs, culminating with a pinch-hit, walk-off grand slam against the Montreal Expos on May 17. After the season concluded, he requested to be traded, but eventually signed a seven-year contract to remain with the Braves.

Pocoroba was selected to the NL All-Star team as a reserve in 1978. He entered as a defensive replacement in the ninth inning of the game. After catching Bruce Sutter for the first two outs, he recorded the final out with his Braves teammate Phil Niekro. That year, Pocoroba finished with a .242 batting average, six home runs and 34 RBIs in 92 games. Defensively, he led NL catchers in range factor per game (6.29), but allowed the fourth-most stolen bases (82) and again finished second in passed balls (12). Injuries to his shoulder took its toll on Pocoroba, who played an average of 53 games from 1979 to 1983. Consequently, his lost out on playing time and was demoted to the role of a backup and pinch hitter. He played more games as a third baseman (21) than as a catcher (9) during the 1981 season, serving as a replacement for the injured Bob Horner.

The Braves advanced to the postseason for the first time in Pocoroba's career in 1982 by winning the National League West division. However, they were swept in the NL Championship Series by the St. Louis Cardinals (the eventual World Series champions), with Pocoroba grounding out in his only plate appearance of the series. He played his final major league game on April 20, 1984, at the age of 30. He was subsequently released by the Braves, having played just four games that season. Noted as a fine contact hitter, Pocoroba finished his career with more walks (182) than strikeouts (109). He also achieved a caught stealing percentage of 34% in the 1976 and 1977 seasons. He is the last MLB player as of the 2020 season to be named "Biff".

== Post-playing career ==
After retiring from baseball, Pocoroba operated a specialty meat business called Sausage World, together with his brothers, Joe and Steve. It was located in Lilburn, in the suburbs of Atlanta, and he worked there for almost three decades. He recalled how his grandfather made the family sausage when he was young, and some of the gourmet sausages made by the company came "from old family recipes".

== Personal life ==
Pocoroba was married to Jody Karin Raymond for 37 years until his death. Together, they had four children: Jenna, Keisa, Victor, and Angela.

Pocoroba died on May 24, 2020, at the age of 66. No cause of death was provided.

== See also ==
- List of Major League Baseball players who spent their entire career with one franchise
