= Bruce Benedict =

American baseball player (born 1955)

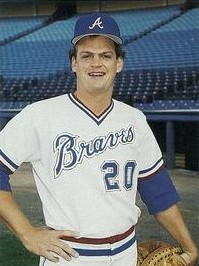
- Benedict in 1984
- Catcher
- Born: August 18, 1955 (age 71); Birmingham, Alabama, U.S.
- Batted: Right Threw: Right

MLB debut
- August 18, 1978, for the Atlanta Braves

Last MLB appearance
- September 11, 1989, for the Atlanta Braves

MLB statistics
- Batting average: .242
- Home runs: 18
- Runs batted in: 260
- Stats at Baseball Reference

Teams
- Atlanta Braves (1978–1989)

Career highlights and awards
- 2× All-Star (1981, 1983)

Bruce Edwin Benedict (born August 18, 1955) is an American former professional baseball player, coach and scout. He played 12 seasons in Major League Baseball as a catcher for the Atlanta Braves from 1978 to 1989.

== Major League career ==
Benedict attended Millard High School, now Millard South High School, then went on to college at the University of Nebraska at Omaha and was drafted by the Atlanta Braves in the 5th round of the 1976 Major League Baseball draft. He made his major league debut on August 18, 1978, his 23rd birthday.

Benedict led National League catchers in 1981 with 73 assists and 48 baserunners caught stealing. His defensive skills earned him a spot as a reserve on the 1981 National League All-Star team.

In 1982, Benedict led National League catchers with a .993 fielding percentage, as the Braves won the National League Western Division title. The highlight of Benedict's season came in a regular season game when he set an MLB record by throwing out 3 baserunners in one inning. In the only post-season appearance of his career, the Braves lost to the St. Louis Cardinals in the 1982 National League Championship Series.

In 1983, Benedict had a batting average well over .300 in the middle of June, to earn a place as a reserve player for the National League in the 1983 All-Star Game. He ended the season with a career-high batting average of .298 with two home runs, 43 runs batted in and a .992 fielding percentage, second only to Gary Carter among National League catchers.

Benedict's batting average fell to .223 with only 25 RBIs in 1984 and he was replaced by Rick Cerone in 1985, as the Braves sought more offense from the catcher's position. He continued to work as a backup catcher to Ozzie Virgil from 1986 to 1988 and then to Jody Davis in 1989. He retired after the 1989 season having spent his entire career with the Braves.

== Career statistics ==
In a twelve-year major league career, Benedict played in 982 games, accumulating 696 hits in 2,878 at bats for a .242 career batting average along with 18 home runs and 260 runs batted in. While he was a light-hitting player, he had good defensive abilities, ending his career with a .990 fielding percentage. A two-time All-Star, Benedict's value to the Braves was as a defensive catcher; his development enabled the Braves to find another position for Dale Murphy, who would have his greatest seasons as an outfielder and, subsequently, the Braves became National League contenders. He never played a position other than catcher during his entire major league career. The Fulton County Stadium crowd would commonly chant "BRUUUCE" whenever Benedict came up to bat at home, perhaps giving the impression that he was being booed. Benedict's nickname is "Eggs", as in Eggs Benedict.

== Coaching and scouting career ==
Since retiring as a player, Benedict has served several positions in the New York Mets organization. He managed in the Mets minor-league system, then became an advance scout for the major-league team. He resigned his position in 2006. He then scouted for the St. Louis Cardinals.

Benedict also serves as a college basketball official in the NCAA's Division I and Division II. He is currently an Atlanta-based scout for the Chicago White Sox and operates the Bruce Benedict Baseball Academy.

== Personal life ==
His son, Griffin, played collegiate baseball for the Georgia Southern Eagles and was drafted in 2009. He played in the minor leagues for the San Diego Padres for two seasons. He then accepted a role as the bullpen catcher for the major league team in 2011.

== See also ==
- List of Major League Baseball players who spent their entire career with one franchise
