= Bob Porter (baseball) =

American baseball player (born 1959)

- Left fielder
- Born: July 22, 1959 (age 67); Yuma, Arizona, U.S.
- Batted: Left Threw: Left

MLB debut
- May 13, 1981, for the Atlanta Braves

Last MLB appearance
- September 30, 1982, for the Atlanta Braves

MLB statistics
- Batting average: .171
- Home runs: 0
- Runs batted in: 3
- Stats at Baseball Reference

Teams
- Atlanta Braves (1981–1982)

Robert Lee Porter (born July 22, 1959) is an American former professional baseball player, an outfielder who appeared in 41 Major League games played for the Atlanta Braves during parts of the 1981 and 1982 seasons. He threw and batted left-handed, stood 5 feet 10 inches (1.78 m) tall and weighed 180 pounds (82 kg) during his active career.

Porter was chosen by the Braves in the third round of the 1977 Major League Baseball draft after his graduation from Napa High School. He was in his fifth professional season when he made his debut with the Braves on May 13, 1981. Pinch hitting for pitcher Preston Hanna, Porter singled off Jim Bibby of the Pittsburgh Pirates. It would be one of Porter's seven big-league hits during his brief career with the Braves. He collected one extra base hit, a double, and scored three runs.

Porter's pro career ended after his seventh minor league season in 1983.
