= Joaquín Andújar =

Dominican baseball player (1952–2015)

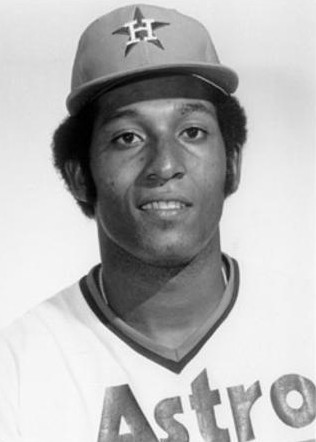
- Andújar in 1976
- Pitcher
- Born: December 21, 1952; San Pedro de Macorís, Dominican Republic
- Died: September 8, 2015 (aged 62); San Pedro de Macorís, Dominican Republic
- Batted: Switch Threw: Right

MLB debut
- April 8, 1976, for the Houston Astros

Last MLB appearance
- September 30, 1988, for the Houston Astros

MLB statistics
- Win–loss record: 127–118
- Earned run average: 3.58
- Strikeouts: 1,032
- Stats at Baseball Reference

Teams
- Houston Astros (1976–1981); St. Louis Cardinals (1981–1985); Oakland Athletics (1986–1987); Houston Astros (1988)

Career highlights and awards
- 4× All-Star (1977, 1979, 1984, 1985); World Series champion (1982); Gold Glove Award (1984); NL wins leader (1984)

Joaquín Andújar (Spanish: [xoaˈkin anˈduxaɾ]; December 21, 1952 – September 8, 2015) was a Dominican professional baseball pitcher who played in Major League Baseball (MLB) for the Houston Astros, St. Louis Cardinals, and Oakland Athletics from 1976 through 1988. Andújar was a four-time MLB All-Star and a Gold Glove Award winner.

== Early years ==
Andújar signed with the Cincinnati Reds in 1969, one month shy of his 17th birthday. He posted a 33–41 record with a 4.33 earned run average over six seasons in the Reds' farm system. Following the 1975 season, he was dealt to the Houston Astros for two players to be named later (on December 12, 1975, the Reds received reliever Luis Sanchez and third baseman and catcher Carlos Alfonso).

== Playing career ==
=== Houston Astros (1976–1981) ===
Andújar made his Major League debut in the 1976 season opener against his former franchise. After two relief appearances against the Reds, he was moved into the starting rotation. On July 11 and July 17, Andújar pitched consecutive 1–0 shutouts against the Montreal Expos and New York Mets. For the season, he went 9–10 with a 3.60 ERA.

Andújar was 10–5 with a 3.47 ERA at the 1977 All-Star break, and he was named the Astros' sole representative in the All-Star game. However, he injured himself in his final start before the game and could not play. He did not return to his team until September and finished the season 11–8 with a 3.69 ERA.

Andújar began seeing more work out of the bullpen in 1978 and earned his first career save on August 25 against the Pittsburgh Pirates. He began the 1979 season in the bullpen and was 4–2 with a 3.23 ERA with three saves and two blown saves when he was added back to the starting rotation. He responded with four consecutive complete game victories in which he gave up just one earned run per game. He was named to his second National League All-Star team and pitched two innings while giving up two runs (one earned). On August 14, he pitched a four-hit complete game against the Montreal Expos while hitting an inside-the-park home run to account for both of the Astros' runs in a 2–1 win.

While splitting time between starting and relieving, he went 3–8 in 1980. The Astros won a one-game playoff against the Los Angeles Dodgers, which resulted in Andújar making his first postseason appearance. He recorded a save in Game Two of the 1980 National League Championship Series against the Philadelphia Phillies. Andújar was the first player to have a postseason save for the Astros and he was the only one to do so until 2004.

=== St. Louis Cardinals (1981–1985) ===
==== 1981–1984 ====
After starting the 1981 season at 2–3 with a 4.88 ERA, Andújar was acquired by the St. Louis Cardinals from the Astros for Tony Scott on June 6, 1981, just before the players' strike. MLB.com Cardinals beat writer Jenifer Langosch wrote in 2013 that it was one of the five best in-season trades in franchise history.

He returned to a starting role with the Cardinals and responded by going 6–1 for the rest of the 1981 season. In 1982, he pitched a career high 265 2/3 innings. He won his last 7 decisions and had a 1.64 ERA down the stretch to finish the season at 15–10. He pitched a three-hit shutout of the Philadelphia Phillies at Veterans Stadium on September 15 that put his team 1 1/2 games up on the Phillies in the National League East, a lead they held for the remainder of the season.

The Cardinals swept the Atlanta Braves in the 1982 National League Championship Series, with Andújar starting and winning Game 3. He started two games in the 1982 World Series against the Milwaukee Brewers, winning both with a 1.35 ERA. He was taken off the field during Game 3 after he was hit in the leg by a line drive. St. Louis manager Whitey Herzog later said that he thought Andújar had been killed by the batted ball, but Andújar recovered in time to start Game 7.

Andújar had a career year in 1984, going 13–6 with a 2.90 ERA at the All-Star break to earn his third All-Star selection (though he was unable to attend). He ended the season at 20–14 with a 3.34 ERA; he led the league in wins, innings pitched (261.1), and shutouts (four) while winning the Gold Glove Award at pitcher. In 1982 and 1984, he led the Cardinals in wins, ERA, games started, complete games, innings pitched, shutouts, and strikeouts.

==== 1985 ====
Andújar got off to a 12–1 start in 1985, and made his fourth All-Star team. The Cardinals and New York Mets became embroiled in a heated battle for the NL East crown that came down to the wire. Andújar went 3–1 with a 4.29 ERA against the Mets that season. A 5–2 loss on October 2 against Dwight Gooden allowed the Mets to pull within a game of the Cardinals. This loss became perhaps the most memorable game Andújar pitched in the rivalry that developed between the two clubs. The Cardinals won the following day and ended up taking the division by three games over the Mets. Andújar ended the season at 21–12 with a 3.40 ERA. In the 1985 National League Championship Series, he was ineffective in his Game 2 start against the Los Angeles Dodgers, which put the Cardinals in a two-game hole. St. Louis came back to win the following four games, which paved the Cardinals' way to the World Series. (Andújar started the decisive Game 6 of the NLCS but did not figure into the decision.)

Between 1982 and 1985, Andújar averaged more than 36 games started per season. A major league pitcher has not had more than 36 starts in one season since Greg Maddux started 37 games in 1991.

==== 1985 World Series ====
The World Series against the Kansas City Royals went poorly for Andújar. He lasted 4+ innings in Game 3 and took the loss opposite a dominant Bret Saberhagen. John Tudor, meanwhile, was 3–1 with a 1.59 ERA that postseason, leading Cardinals manager Whitey Herzog to go with Tudor in the decisive Game 7, despite the fact that Andújar had five days' rest. The strategy failed, and Tudor was pulled in the third with the bases loaded and three runs already on the board. The score was 10–0 by the time Herzog brought Andújar in for mop-up duty. When umpire Don Denkinger called a ball, Andújar emphatically showed his disagreement and had to be restrained by teammates. Herzog was furious and was ejected. A pitch later, Andújar was ejected for arguing another pitch which was clearly off the plate. Andújar charged Denkinger, bumping the umpire before being restrained by teammates.

Herzog's decision to send in Andújar—normally a starter—led to speculation that his decision was payback for Denkinger's infamous call in Game 6, but Herzog had stated that Andújar was the only Cardinal pitcher that still had any life left in his arm, as the Cardinals had gone through seven pitchers in the game.

Andújar was so furious after being ejected from Game 7 that he demolished a toilet and sink in the visitor's clubhouse bathroom in Royals Stadium with a bat. As a result of this and his conduct toward Denkinger, Andújar was fined $500—the maximum permissible amount at the time—and was suspended for the first 10 games of the following regular season. Andújar was additionally ordered to make restitution for damages.

=== Oakland Athletics (1986–1987) ===
Andújar was traded from the Cardinals to the Oakland Athletics for Mike Heath and Tim Conroy during the Winter Meetings on December 10, 1985. Herzog denied that the transaction had anything to do with Andújar winning only one game after August 23 or what transpired during the World Series. Cardinals general manager Dal Maxvill said that the team needed a catcher after releasing Darrell Porter and having only a barely tested Tom Nieto on its depth chart.

Andújar was to begin the 1986 season serving a ten-game suspension (later reduced to five) for the World Series feud with Denkinger. Also, on February 28, 1986, Baseball Commissioner Peter Ueberroth handed down season-long suspensions to Andújar—who police say dealt drugs to then-Cardinals teammate Lonnie Smith in 1982—and six other players, including Smith, who had admitted to cocaine abuse during the Pittsburgh drug trials. The suspensions were reduced to anti-drug donations and community service.

Denkinger was the home plate umpire for Andújar's first start of 1986. His first start of the season was uneventful as Andújar lasted just 4+ innings while giving up 6 earned runs. Despite his lackluster start to the season, Andújar had a decent year in 1986, going 12–7 with a 3.82 ERA. He suffered numerous injuries along the way, including an injury sustained during batting practice.

Injuries limited Andújar to 13 starts in 1987. His last start was on August 3, and he lasted just two-thirds of an inning, giving up 3 runs.

=== Final season ===
Andújar returned to the Astros in 1988 and was slated to work from the Astros' bullpen; however, because of injuries in the starting rotation, Andújar made some mid-season starts. He ended the season at 2–5 with a 4.00 ERA.

He earned a 5–0 record in the Senior Professional Baseball Association (SPBA) in late 1989. When he was signed by the Montreal Expos on December 11, he became the first SPBA player to sign with an MLB club. He was released by the Expos the following March.

== After baseball ==
After retiring from baseball, Andújar started a trucking business in the Dominican Republic. In 2012, Andújar was inducted into the Caribbean Baseball Hall of Fame. He died at his home on September 8, 2015, in San Pedro de Macorís, from complications of diabetes.

== See also ==
- Houston Astros award winners and league leaders
- List of Major League Baseball annual shutout leaders
- List of Major League Baseball players from the Dominican Republic
- St. Louis Cardinals award winners and league leaders
