= Jeff Dedmon =

American baseball player (born 1960)

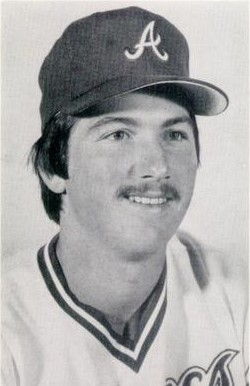
- Pitcher
- Born: March 4, 1960 (age 66); Torrance, California, U.S.
- Batted: Left Threw: Right

MLB debut
- September 2, 1983, for the Atlanta Braves

Last MLB appearance
- September 29, 1988, for the Cleveland Indians

MLB statistics
- Win–loss record: 20–16
- Earned run average: 3.84
- Strikeouts: 210
- Stats at Baseball Reference

Teams
- Atlanta Braves (1983–1987); Cleveland Indians (1988)

Jeffrey Linden Dedmon (born March 4, 1960) is an American former professional baseball player, a right-handed pitcher who appeared in 250 Major League games over six seasons for the Atlanta Braves (1983–1987) and Cleveland Indians (1988). Listed at 6 feet 2 inches (1.88 m) tall and 200 pounds (91 kg), he attended Narbonne High School in Harbor City, California, and was selected by the Braves out of West Los Angeles College in the first round of the secondary phase of the 1980 June draft.

A starting pitcher for his first two years in minor league baseball, he converted to a reliever during his third professional campaign, and when he reached the Major Leagues in September 1983 he continued in that role, making only three starts in his big-league career. Dedmon worked in over 50 games for four consecutive seasons (1984–1987) with the Braves (although the first two of those seasons included time spent with the Triple-A Richmond Braves). His most effective MLB season was 1986, in which he equaled his career high in games won (6) and set personal-bests in innings pitched (992/3), earned run average (2.98), and walks plus hits per inning pitched (WHIP) (1.29). He was traded to the Indians on the eve of the 1988 season and split that year between Cleveland and the Triple-A Colorado Springs Sky Sox.

In 394 big-league innings pitched, Dedmon allowed 387 hits and 186 bases on balls. He struck out 210 and recorded 12 saves. Dedmon retired after the 1989 season, his tenth in organized baseball.
