= Tony Brizzolara =

American baseball player (born 1957)

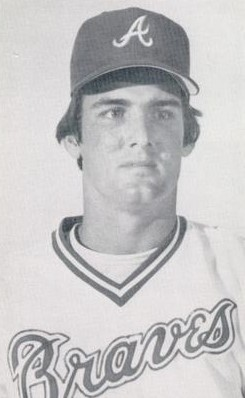
- Pitcher
- Born: January 14, 1957 (age 69); Santa Monica, California, U.S.
- Batted: Right Threw: Right

MLB debut
- May 19, 1979, for the Atlanta Braves

Last MLB appearance
- September 28, 1984, for the Atlanta Braves

MLB statistics
- Win–loss record: 8–11
- Earned run average: 5.06
- Strikeouts: 98
- Stats at Baseball Reference

Teams
- Atlanta Braves (1979, 1983–1984)

Anthony John Brizzolara (born January 14, 1957) is an American former professional baseball pitcher. He played in Major League Baseball for the Atlanta Braves between 1979 and 1984.

== Amateur career ==
Brizzolara graduated from Beloit Memorial High School in Beloit, Wisconsin, and played college baseball at the University of Texas at Austin. In 1975, he played collegiate summer baseball in the Cape Cod Baseball League for the Yarmouth Red Sox. He was selected by the Braves in the second round of the 1977 Major League Baseball draft.

== Professional career ==
After going 17-12 with a 2.74 earned run average in the Atlanta farm system between 1977 and 1979, the Braves brought Brizzolara up to the majors in May 1979. He remained in the Braves' starting rotation for the rest of the season, going 6-9 with a 5.28 ERA in 107.1 innings of work.

Brizzolara spent 1980 to 1983 with the Triple A Richmond Braves. In July 1983, he received his second call to the majors. Though he was a starter in 1979 and for most of his minor league career, he was used strictly in relief by manager Joe Torre during the 1983 season, posting a 3.54 ERA in 14 appearances. On October 2, 1983, Brizzolara recorded his one and only save at the major league level. It came in game 162 of the 1983 season. He pitched 2 scoreless innings to secure a 4-3 Braves win over the Padres. He preserved the win for Ken Dayley.

Once more, he opened the 1984 season at Richmond, and went 7-7 with a 3.23 ERA as a starting pitcher. He came up to Atlanta in August, and went 1-2 with a 5.28 ERA through the end of the season. After going 10-12 with a 3.27 ERA for Richmond in 1985, he signed as a minor league free agent with the Chicago White Sox. He spent one season with their Triple A affiliate, the Buffalo Bisons, going 6-6 with a 5.40 ERA.
