= Albert Hall (baseball) =

American baseball player (1958–2025)

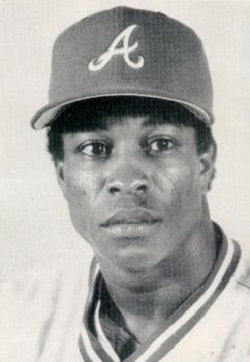
- Outfielder
- Born: March 7, 1958; Birmingham, Alabama, U.S.
- Died: December 16, 2025 (aged 67); Birmingham, Alabama, U.S.
- Batted: Switch Threw: Right

MLB debut
- September 12, 1981, for the Atlanta Braves

Last MLB appearance
- October 1, 1989, for the Pittsburgh Pirates

MLB statistics
- Batting average: .251
- Home runs: 5
- Runs batted in: 53
- Stats at Baseball Reference

Teams
- Atlanta Braves (1981–1988); Pittsburgh Pirates (1989)

Career highlights and awards
- Hit for the cycle on September 23, 1987

Albert Hall (March 7, 1958 – December 16, 2025) was an American professional baseball player who played the majority of his Major League career for the Atlanta Braves. Hall appeared in a total of 375 games played in the National League between 1981 and 1989; 355 of those games were as a member of the Braves. He added twenty games to his MLB résumé at the end of his career with the 1989 Pittsburgh Pirates.

== Career ==
Hall was a switch hitter who threw right-handed; he stood 5 feet 11 inches (1.80 m) tall and weighed 155 pounds (70 kg). He was selected by the Braves in the sixth round of the 1977 Major League Baseball draft out of Birmingham's Jones Valley High School. After spending his first two professional seasons in Rookie ball, Hall quickly developed a reputation as a prolific base stealer in minor league baseball. In successive seasons, he stole 66 (1979), 100 (1980), 60 (1981) and 62 (1982) bases at progressively higher levels of the Braves' farm system. Then, in 1986, he stole 72 bases for the Triple-A Richmond Braves.

He spent only two full seasons, 1984 and 1987, in Major League Baseball. His finest big league season was 1987, when he set MLB-career highs in games played (92), runs scored (54), hits (83), doubles (20), triples (4), home runs (three), runs batted in (24), stolen bases (33), and batting average .284. On September 23, he became the first Atlanta Brave to hit for the cycle, becoming the first player in franchise history to do so since Bill Collins in 1910.

During his MLB career, Hall stole 67 bases and was caught stealing 29 times (.698). In the minors, he had 455 thefts in 566 attempts (.803).

== Death ==
Hall died on December 16, 2025, at the age of 67.

== See also ==
- List of Major League Baseball players to hit for the cycle

Achievements
Preceded by Tim Raines	Hitting for the cycle September 23, 1987	Succeeded by Robin Yount
