= Paul Zuvella =

American baseball player (born 1958)

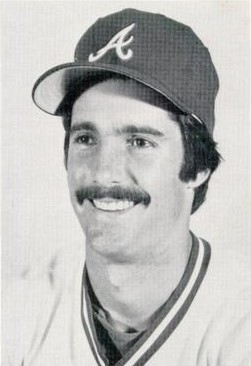
- Shortstop
- Born: October 31, 1958 (age 67); San Mateo, California, U.S.
- Batted: Right Threw: Right

MLB debut
- September 4, 1982, for the Atlanta Braves

Last MLB appearance
- May 2, 1991, for the Kansas City Royals

MLB statistics
- Batting average: .222
- Home runs: 2
- Runs batted in: 20
- Stats at Baseball Reference

Teams
- Atlanta Braves (1982–1985); New York Yankees (1986–1987); Cleveland Indians (1988–1989); Kansas City Royals (1991)

Paul Zuvella
Medal record

Baseball

Representing the United States

Amateur World Series
Silver medal – second place	1978 Italy	Team

Paul Zuvella (born October 31, 1958) is an American former Major League Baseball player and minor league baseball manager. Primarily a shortstop and second baseman, he stood 6'0" tall, weighed 178 pounds, and batted and threw right-handed.

== Atlanta Braves ==
Following his graduation from Samuel Ayer High School in Milpitas, California, Zuvella matriculated at Stanford University. The Milwaukee Brewers selected him in the eleventh round of the June 1979 Major League Baseball draft, but he elected not to sign and returned to school for his senior year. After which, the Atlanta Braves selected him in the fifteenth round of the 1980 Major League Baseball draft.

Zuvella batted .315 his first professional season with the Durham Bulls. In 1981, Zuvella batted .299 with eleven home runs for the Savannah Braves, however, his .947 fielding percentage was less than acceptable for a shortstop. His fielding improved considerably in 1982, and at the end of the season, he received a September call-up to the Atlanta Braves.

Zuvella made his major league debut with the Braves on September 4, 1982, appearing as a pinch runner in a 4–1 loss to the Montreal Expos. With All-Star Rafael Ramírez firmly entrenched at short, Zuvella spent parts of the next four seasons on Atlanta's bench, appearing in a career-high 81 games in 1985. In that season, his most successful, he batted .253 in 190 at bats.

== New York Yankees ==
Following Bucky Dent's August 8, 1982 trade to the Texas Rangers, the New York Yankees had difficulty replacing him at short (with Roy Smalley, Bobby Meacham, Dale Berra, Tim Foli and Andre Robertson, among others, having been given a shot at the position). When the Yankees acquired Zuvella on June 30, 1986 along with outfielder Claudell Washington for Ken Griffey and Andre Robertson, they believed that they finally found the man who would be able to hold down the position.

As it turned out, Zuvella got off to an extremely slow start with the Yankees, going hitless in his first 28 at bats. By the end of the season, he was reassigned to the Yankees' triple-A affiliate, the Columbus Clippers, and Wayne Tolleson was given the starting shortstop job.

Zuvella split 1987 between the Yankees and Columbus as well, but his hitting did not improve any, and he was released at the end of the season. In two seasons with the Yankees, Zuvella batted .122 with two runs batted in, four runs scored and no home runs.

== Cleveland Indians ==
Prior to the start of the 1988 season, Zuvella signed with the Cleveland Indians. He was reasonably productive serving as Jay Bell's and Félix Fermín's back-up in 1988 and 1989, respectively, but Cleveland released him during spring training in 1990. Zuvella signed with the Kansas City Royals immediately afterwards, spending the next two seasons with their triple-A affiliate, the Omaha Royals before retiring. He appeared in two games with Kansas City in the beginning of the 1991 season.

== Post-playing career ==
After his retirement as a player, Zuvella worked in the Colorado Rockies organization as a manager and instructor. From 1994 to 1995, he was the manager of the Class AA New Haven Ravens. He has also returned to Stanford on several occasions to play in the school's annual Alumni Game.

== Ferris Bueller's Day Off ==
Game footage of Zuvella appears in the 1986 movie Ferris Bueller's Day Off. In the film, the character Mr. Rooney is watching a game between the Braves and the Chicago Cubs on a television in a tavern. He sees batter Claudell Washington hit a foul ball, which is caught by the film's title character, who was supposedly sick at home from school. This footage was taken from a game played on June 5, 1985, and in the clip, Zuvella is the runner on first base.

== Notes ==
Preceded by Brad Mills	Colorado Springs Sky Sox Manager; 1997–1998	Succeeded by Bill Hayes
