= Preston Hanna =

American baseball player (1954–2023)

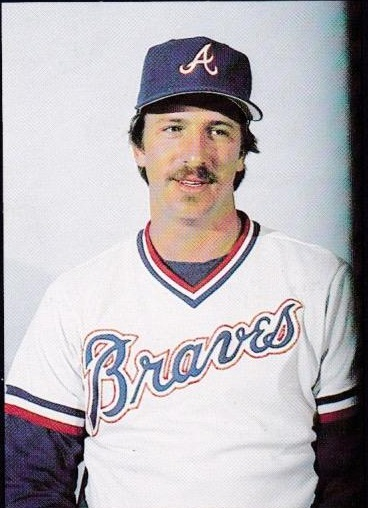
- Pitcher
- Born: September 10, 1954; Pensacola, Florida, U.S.
- Died: November 20, 2023 (aged 69); Gulf Breeze, Florida, U.S.
- Batted: Right Threw: Right

MLB debut
- September 13, 1975, for the Atlanta Braves

Last MLB appearance
- October 3, 1982, for the Oakland Athletics

MLB statistics
- Win–loss record: 17–25
- Earned run average: 4.61
- Strikeouts: 253
- Stats at Baseball Reference

Teams
- Atlanta Braves (1975–1982); Oakland Athletics (1982)

Preston Lee Hanna (September 10, 1954 – November 20, 2023) was an American Major League Baseball pitcher. He played all or parts of eight seasons in the major leagues from 1975 until 1982. He was drafted by the Atlanta Braves in the first round of the 1972 Major League Baseball draft, 11th overall, and stayed with their organization until his release in July 1982. He played the rest of that season with the Oakland Athletics to finish his career. Hanna died on November 20, 2023, at the age of 69.
