= Richard Albert (field hockey) =

Canadian field hockey player

Medal record

Men's field hockey

Representing Canada

Pan American Games
Gold medal – first place	1987 Indianapolis	Team

Richard Albert (born 20 September 1963 in Toronto, Ontario) is a Canadian former field hockey player who competed in the 1988 Summer Olympics.
