= Randy Johnson (third baseman) =

American baseball player (born 1956)

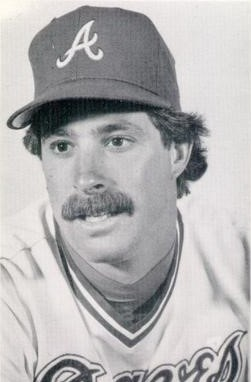
- Third baseman
- Born: June 10, 1956 (age 70); Escondido, California, U.S.
- Batted: Right Threw: Right

MLB debut
- April 27, 1982, for the Atlanta Braves

Last MLB appearance
- September 30, 1984, for the Atlanta Braves

MLB statistics
- Batting average: .267
- Home runs: 6
- Runs batted in: 53

NPB statistics
- Batting average: .306
- Home runs: 9
- Runs batted in: 38
- Stats at Baseball Reference

Teams
- Atlanta Braves (1982–1984); Hiroshima Toyo Carp (1987–1988)

Randall Glenn Johnson (born June 10, 1956) is an American former Major League Baseball third baseman. He played three full seasons in the Majors, from 1982 through 1984, for the Atlanta Braves. He also played two seasons in Japan, 1987 and 1988, for the Hiroshima Toyo Carp. He served as the minor league field coordinator for the San Diego Padres from 2010-2015. He is now a major league scout for the Detroit Tigers and is in his 40th year in professional baseball.

== Amateur career ==
Johnson played both football and baseball at Palomar College, where he was an All-State placekicker in 1975. He then attended San Jose State University, where he was a multi-sport athlete again. He was named an Academic All-American in 1978 for baseball. He was drafted in the 11th round of the 1978 Major League Baseball draft by the New York Mets.

== Professional career ==
Johnson played in the Mets farm system for two seasons before being traded to the Atlanta Braves in 1980. He made his Major League debut in 1982, and became the starting third baseman in 1984. That year he hit .279 with 5 HR’s and 30 RBI in 322 PA’s. He was released by the Braves following the 1985 season, and subsequently signed with the San Francisco Giants as a free agent. He played for their top farm club, the Phoenix Firebirds, in 1986 before signing with the Hiroshima Toyo Carp.

He later played for the West Palm Beach Tropics in the Senior Professional Baseball Association in 1989-90 and one season in the Australian Baseball League for the Brisbane Bandits in 1991.

== Post-playing career ==
Since 1989, Johnson has scouted for the Padres, Colorado Rockies, Detroit Tigers and worked for the Oakland Athletics as special assistant to the team's general manager, Billy Beane, from 2003 to 2010. In February 2010, he was named the Padres' minor league field coordinator, a job he held until 2015. He is now a major league scout for the Tigers.
