= Matt Sinatro =

American baseball player and coach (born 1960)

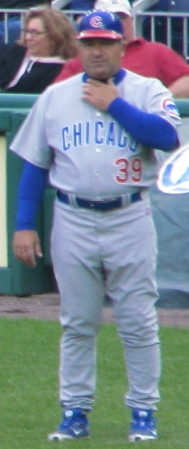
- Sinatro as first-base coach for the Chicago Cubs in 2008
- Catcher
- Born: March 22, 1960 (age 66); Hartford, Connecticut, U.S.
- Batted: Right Threw: Right

MLB debut
- September 22, 1981, for the Atlanta Braves

Last MLB appearance
- May 26, 1992, for the Seattle Mariners

MLB statistics
- Batting average: .190
- Home runs: 1
- Runs batted in: 21
- Stats at Baseball Reference

Teams
- As player: Atlanta Braves (1981–1984); Oakland Athletics (1987–1988); Detroit Tigers (1989); Seattle Mariners (1990–1992); As coach: Seattle Mariners (1995–2002); Tampa Bay Devil Rays (2003–2005); Chicago Cubs (2007–2010)

Matthew Stephen Sinatro (born March 22, 1960) is an American former professional baseball player, coach, and scout. A catcher during his playing days, he appeared in 140 games over ten seasons in Major League Baseball (MLB) for four teams: the Atlanta Braves (1981–84), Oakland Athletics (1987–88), Detroit Tigers (1989) and Seattle Mariners (1990–92), and had a 15-year career as an MLB coach.

Sinatro was listed as 5 feet 9 inches (1.75 m) tall and 174 pounds (79 kg); he threw and batted right-handed. After graduating from Conard High School in West Hartford, Connecticut, Atlanta selected him in the second round of the 1978 MLB draft. He was the 27th player chosen overall, 21 slots ahead of future Hall of Famer Cal Ripken Jr.

Offensive struggles, including a .245 batting average during a 1,044-game minor league career, hindered Sinatro's development. He was never a regular player in the majors, topping out at 37 games in an MLB season. His 48 career big-league hits included six doubles, one triple, and a home run, a two-run blow off Pete Falcone of the New York Mets on August 27, 1982. The homer contributed to a 9–8 Atlanta win in a season when the Braves prevailed over the Los Angeles Dodgers to win the National League West division by one game. Sinatro also played for the 1988 Athletics team that lost the World Series, but he never played in a postseason game, though he was on the team's roster for the American League Championship Series. Early in the 1989 season, Oakland traded him to the Houston Astros for Troy Afenir, though Sinatro did not play for Houston before the Tigers purchased his contract in June. He joined the Mariners later that season.

After the Mariners released him in October 1992, Sinatro was Seattle's MLB advance scout in 1993–94 before joining the big-league coaching staff of manager Lou Piniella. He would spend his entire coaching career working for Piniella as bullpen coach, first base coach or special assistant with the Mariners, Tampa Bay Devil Rays and Chicago Cubs. In 2012, he was the Astros's catching coordinator and advance scout.
