= Bruce Sutter =

American baseball player (1953–2022)

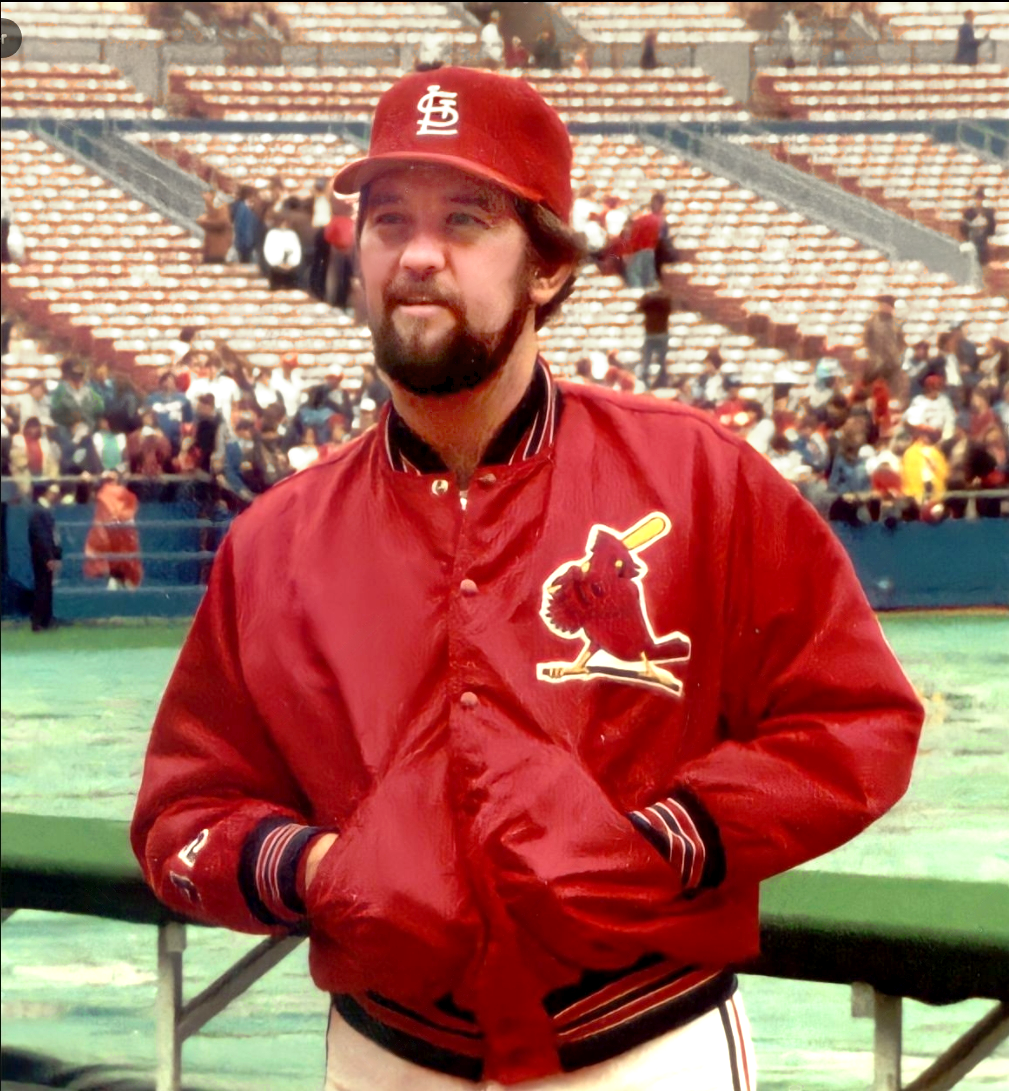
- Sutter with the St. Louis Cardinals in 1984
- Pitcher
- Born: January 8, 1953; Lancaster, Pennsylvania, U.S.
- Died: October 13, 2022 (aged 69); Cartersville, Georgia, U.S.
- Batted: Right Threw: Right

MLB debut
- May 9, 1976, for the Chicago Cubs

Last MLB appearance
- September 9, 1988, for the Atlanta Braves

MLB statistics
- Win–loss record: 68–71
- Earned run average: 2.83
- Strikeouts: 861
- Saves: 300
- Stats at Baseball Reference

Teams
- Chicago Cubs (1976–1980); St. Louis Cardinals (1981–1984); Atlanta Braves (1985–1986, 1988)

Career highlights and awards
- 6× All-Star (1977–1981, 1984); World Series champion (1982); NL Cy Young Award (1979); 4× NL Rolaids Relief Man Award (1979, 1981, 1982, 1984); 5× NL saves leader (1979–1982, 1984); St. Louis Cardinals No. 42 retired; Chicago Cubs Hall of Fame; St. Louis Cardinals Hall of Fame

Member of the National

Baseball Hall of Fame
- Induction: 2006
- Vote: 76.9% (13th ballot)

Howard Bruce Sutter (/ˈsuːtər/; January 8, 1953 – October 13, 2022) was an American professional baseball pitcher. He played 12 seasons in Major League Baseball (MLB) for the Chicago Cubs, St. Louis Cardinals, and Atlanta Braves from 1976 to 1988. He was one of the sport's dominant closers in the late 1970s and early 1980s, making effective use of the split-finger fastball. A six-time All-Star and 1982 World Series champion, Sutter recorded a 2.83 career earned run average and 300 saves, the third-most in MLB history at the time of his retirement. Sutter won the National League (NL) Cy Young Award in 1979 as its top pitcher, and won the NL Rolaids Relief Man Award four times. He became the only pitcher to lead the NL in saves five times (1979–1982, 1984).

Born in Lancaster, Pennsylvania, Sutter briefly attended Old Dominion University and was subsequently signed by the Chicago Cubs as an undrafted free agent in 1971. He played five years for the Cubs, four for the St. Louis Cardinals, and three for the Atlanta Braves, serving as each team's closer during his tenure. His usage in the eighth and ninth innings of games was partly responsible for ushering in a more specialized era for the closer role. In the mid-1980s, Sutter began to experience shoulder problems, undergoing three surgeries before retiring in 1989.

In 2006, Sutter was inducted into the Baseball Hall of Fame. He was also honored by the Cardinals with the retirement of his uniform number 42 in 2006 and induction into the Cardinals Hall of Fame in 2014. Sutter also served as a minor league consultant for the Philadelphia Phillies.

== Early life ==
Sutter was born to Howard and Thelma Sutter in Lancaster, Pennsylvania. His father managed a Farm Bureau warehouse in Mount Joy, Pennsylvania. Bruce was the fifth child of six.

Sutter graduated from Donegal High School in Mount Joy, where he played baseball, football, and basketball. He was quarterback and captain of the football team and also served as captain for the basketball squad, which won a district championship in his senior season. His baseball team also won the county championship.

== Career ==
=== Early career ===
After being selected by the Washington Senators in the 21st round of the 1970 MLB draft, Sutter instead attended Old Dominion University. He dropped out of school and returned to Lancaster to play semi-professional baseball. Ralph DiLullo, a scout for the Chicago Cubs, signed Sutter as a free agent in September 1971. He pitched in two games for the Gulf Coast League Cubs in 1972. When he was 19, Sutter had surgery on his arm to relieve a pinched nerve. When he recovered from surgery and returned to the mound a year later, Sutter found that his previous pitches were no longer effective. He learned the split-finger fastball from minor league pitching instructor Fred Martin. Sutter's large hands helped him to use the pitch, which was a modification of the forkball.

Sutter had nearly been released by the Cubs, but found success with the new pitch. Mike Krukow, who was also a Cubs minor league player at the time, said, "As soon as I saw him throw it, I knew he was going to the big leagues. Everyone wanted to throw it after he did." He recorded a 3–3 win–loss record, a 4.13 earned run average (ERA), and five saves in 40 games for the Quincy Cubs in Class A baseball in 1973.

Sutter split the 1974 season between the Class A Key West Conchs and the Class AA Midland Cubs. Though he finished the season with a combined 2–7 record, he recorded a 1.38 ERA in 65 innings. He returned to Midland in 1975 and finished the year with a 5–7 record, a 2.15 ERA, and 13 saves. Sutter led the team in ERA and saves as they won the Texas League West Division pennant. He started the 1976 season with the Class AAA Wichita Aeros, but he pitched only seven games with the team before being promoted to the major leagues.

=== Chicago Cubs (1976–1980) ===
Sutter joined the Cubs in May 1976. He pitched in 52 games and finished with a 6–3 win–loss record and 10 saves. In 1977 he had a 1.34 ERA, earned an All-Star Game selection, and finished sixth and seventh in NL Cy Young Award and Most Valuable Player Award voting, respectively. On September 8, 1977, Sutter struck out all three batters on nine total pitches in the ninth inning of a 10-inning 3–2 win over the Montreal Expos, becoming the 12th NL pitcher and the 19th pitcher in major-league history to achieve an immaculate inning. Sutter had also struck out the side (although not on nine pitches) upon entering the game in the eighth inning, giving him six consecutive strikeouts, tying the NL record for a reliever.

Sutter's ERA increased to 3.19 in 1978, but he earned 27 saves. In May 1979, the Cubs acquired relief pitcher Dick Tidrow. Tidrow would enter the game and pitch a couple of innings before Sutter came in for the save. Sutter credited Tidrow for much of his success. Sutter saved 37 games for the club, tying the NL record held by Clay Carroll (1972) and Rollie Fingers (1978), and won the NL Cy Young Award. This year also marked the first of five seasons (four consecutive) in which he led the league in saves. Sutter also won the Rolaids Relief Man of the Year Award and The Sporting News Fireman of the Year Award. In addition to a league-leading 28 saves in 1980, Sutter recorded a 2.64 ERA and finished with a 5–8 win–loss record in 60 games. His strikeout total, which had been over 100 the previous three seasons, fell to 76 that year and he never finished with more than 77 strikeouts in any of his remaining seasons.

=== St. Louis Cardinals (1981–1984) ===
Sutter was traded to the St. Louis Cardinals for Leon Durham, Ken Reitz, and a player to be named later in December 1980. He made his fifth consecutive All-Star Game in 1981. He recorded 25 saves, registered a 2.62 ERA, and finished fifth in the NL Cy Young Award voting.

Sutter registered 36 saves in 1982, finishing third in the Cy Young Award voting. Sutter earned the save in the pennant-clinching victory in the NLCS. The Cardinals won the 1982 World Series and Sutter is credited with two saves in that Series, including the Series-clinching save in Game 7 which ended with a strikeout of Gorman Thomas.

In 1983, Sutter recorded a 9–10 win–loss record and a 4.23 ERA; while his save total declined to 21. In April of that year, Sutter executed a rare unassisted pickoff play: as Bill Madlock of the Pittsburgh Pirates took a long lead off first base, he became distracted by Cardinals first baseman Keith Hernandez. Sutter ran off the mound to tag Madlock out.

Sutter, who won both the Rolaids Relief Man of the Year Award and The Sporting News Reliever of the Year Award again in 1981, 1982, and 1984, tied Dan Quisenberry's major league record for most saves in a season (45) in 1984. (His MLB record was broken by Dave Righetti (46) in 1986 and his NL record was broken by Lee Smith (47) in 1991.) During Sutter's record-breaking season, he pitched a career-high 122 2/3 innings. It was one of five seasons in which Sutter threw more than 100 innings.

=== Atlanta Braves (1985–1988) ===
Sutter joined the Atlanta Braves in December 1984 as a free agent. The New York Times reported that Sutter's six-year contract paid him $4.8 million and placed another $4.8 million into a deferred payment account at 13 percent interest. The newspaper estimated that the account would pay Sutter $1.3 million per year for 30 years after the initial six seasons of the contract. Sutter said that he was attracted to the Braves because of Atlanta's scenery and his respect for Ted Turner and Dale Murphy.

Before the start of the 1985 season, Cardinals manager Whitey Herzog commented on facing the season without Sutter. "To me, Bruce is the best there ever was," Herzog said. "Losing him is like Kansas City losing Dan Quisenberry...I told Bruce, 'Look, you've taken care of your children and your grandchildren and your great-grandchildren. Now, if I get fired in July, will you take care of me and Mary Lou?'"

When Sutter arrived in Atlanta, only two Braves pitchers had ever earned 25 or more saves in a season; the Braves in 1984 had recorded 49 saves as a team, just four more than Sutter's own total. In 1985, Sutter's ERA rose to 4.48 and his saves total decreased to 23. By the end of the season, he was bothered by nerve impingement in the right shoulder. He underwent surgery on the shoulder after the season, and recovered in time to appear in spring training in mid-March 1986.

Near the end of March 1986, Sutter commented on his recovery, saying, "I'm throwing the ball as hard as I ever have, but it's just not getting there as fast. I don't know what's going to happen. I just have to keep throwing and see. So far, there have been no setbacks. Today I felt great, no problems." Sutter started the season with a 2–0 record and a 4.34 ERA in 16 games. He was placed on the disabled list in May due to arm problems. On July 31, manager Chuck Tanner announced that Sutter would probably not return to pitching in that season.

Sutter underwent shoulder surgery in February 1987, the third procedure performed on his arm, in an attempt to remove scar tissue and to promote nerve healing. To recover from the surgery, he was required to miss the entire 1987 season. He returned to limited action with the Braves in 1988. In late May, Sutter earned saves on consecutive nights and sportswriter Jerome Holtzman characterized his pitching as "vintage Sutter". He finished the year with a 1–4 record, a 4.76 ERA and 14 saves in 38 games pitched. In late September, he had arthroscopic surgery on his right knee.

== Retirement ==
By March 1989, Sutter was dealing with a severely torn rotator cuff and he admitted that he would be unlikely to return to baseball. "There's probably a 99.9 percent chance I won't be able to pitch again," he said. General Manager Bobby Cox said that "Bruce is not going to retire. We're not going to release him. We'll put him on the 21-day disabled list, then probably move him to the 60-day disabled list later on." Sutter planned to reevaluate his condition after resting his arm for three to four months. The Braves released him that November.

Sutter retired with exactly 300 saves — at the time, the third-highest total in history, behind Rollie Fingers (341) and Goose Gossage (302). His career saves total was an NL record until broken by Lee Smith in 1993.

== Hall of Fame ==
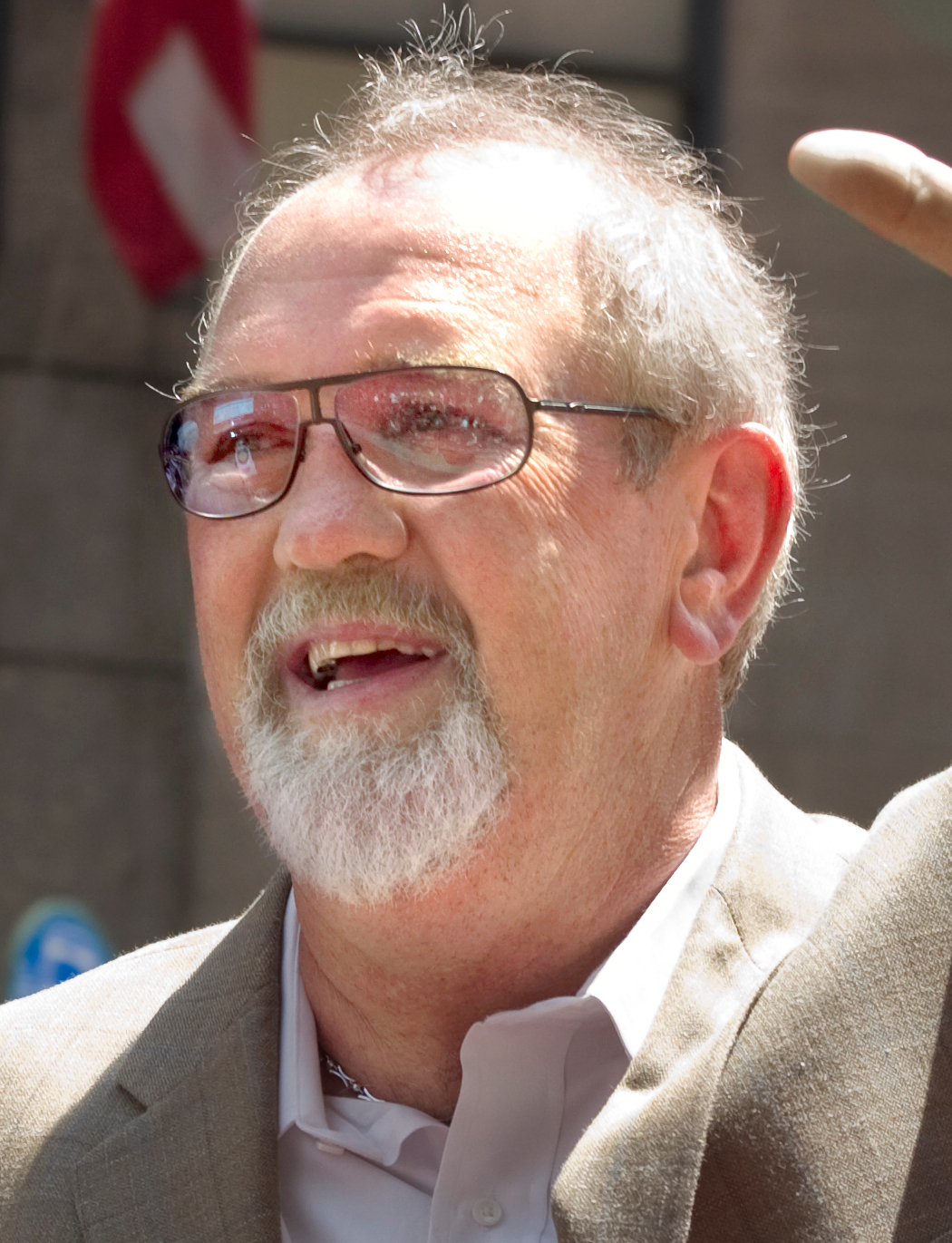
Sutter during the 2008 Major League Baseball All-Star Game Red Carpet Parade

Sutter appeared on his thirteenth Baseball Hall of Fame ballot in 2006. Sportswriter Matthew Leach of MLB.com referred to this ballot as Sutter's best chance for induction; he pointed out that Sutter would only be eligible for two more Hall of Fame ballots. Nearing the end of his eligibility, Sutter said he did not think about induction very often. "It's just an honor to be on the ballot, but it's not something I think that much about. I have no control over it. ... It's out of my hands. It's the voters, it's in the voters' hands. There's nothing I can do about it. I can't pitch anymore... There's a lot of guys that I think should be in that aren't in. It's for the special few people to get into the Hall of Fame. It shouldn't be easy to get in", he said. On January 10, 2006, Sutter was elected to the Baseball Hall of Fame in his 13th year of eligibility by receiving 400 votes out of a possible 520 (76.9%). He was the fourth relief pitcher inducted, and the first pitcher inducted without starting a game.

MLB.com columnist Mike Bauman attributed the delay in Sutter's Hall of Fame election to several factors. He pointed out that Sutter's first five strong seasons were with the Cubs, a team that did not receive much attention during those years. He also noted that the closer role was relatively new in baseball history. Finally, he wrote that Sutter's candidacy was hurt because his career was cut short by injuries.

At his Hall of Fame induction that July, Sutter was the only former MLB player inducted. However, he was joined by 17 Negro league baseball players. During his induction speech, Sutter said, "I haven't played baseball for 18 years now and I'm getting more sentimental as I get older. You start losing family members and you start losing friends. There are teammates who have passed on. You start thinking of them as you put together a speech. I'm not usually an emotional guy. My kids said the first time they ever saw me cry was when I got that phone call [telling him that he was elected]. Now today. I guess a lot of people have seen me crying now." Johnny Bench and Ozzie Smith wore decorative beards to the induction speech in honor of Sutter. Sutter's Hall of Fame plaque depicts him wearing a Cardinals cap.

== Other honors ==
Bruce Sutter's number 42 was retired by the St. Louis Cardinals in 2006.

Sutter's number 42, which he wore throughout his career, was retired by the St. Louis Cardinals during a ceremony at Busch Stadium on September 17, 2006. He shares his retired number with Jackie Robinson, whose number 42 was retired by all MLB teams in 1997.

In November 2010, Sutter was inducted into the St. Louis Sports Hall of Fame. A few months later, Whitey Herzog accepted the honor in place of Sutter, whose wife was hospitalized with cancer. In January 2014, the Cardinals announced Sutter among 22 former players and personnel to be inducted into the St. Louis Cardinals Hall of Fame Museum for the inaugural class of 2014.

== Personal life and death ==
Sutter remained in Atlanta with his wife and three sons after retirement. His son Chad was a catcher who played for Tulane University and was selected by the New York Yankees in the 23rd round (711th overall) of the 1999 amateur draft. Chad played one season in the minor leagues and later joined the coaching staff of the Tulane baseball team.

On August 23, 2010, Sutter was named a minor league consultant for the Philadelphia Phillies. He was hired to evaluate pitching prospects at the team's Double-A and Triple-A affiliates.

Sutter died at the age of 69 while in hospice in Cartersville, Georgia, on October 13, 2022, after a recent diagnosis of cancer.

Upon the news of his death, MLB Commissioner Rob Manfred said, "Bruce Sutter was the first pitcher to reach the Hall of Fame without starting a game, and he was one of the key figures who foreshadowed how the use of relievers would evolve. Bruce will be remembered as one of the best pitchers in the histories of two of our most historic franchises."

== See also ==
- List of Major League Baseball annual saves leaders
- List of St. Louis Cardinals team records
- Major League Baseball titles leaders
