= Gene Garber =

American baseball player (born 1947)

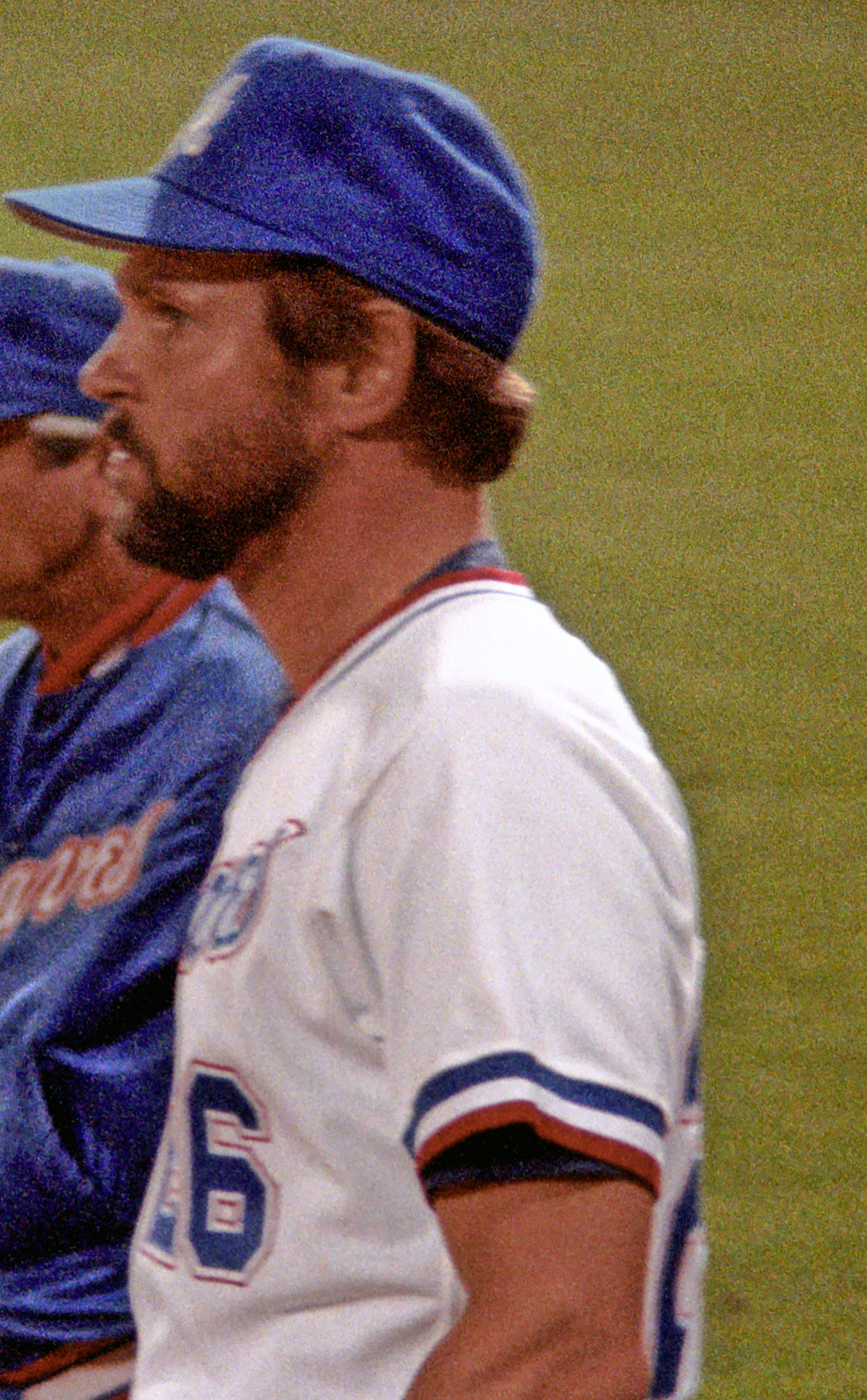
- Garber in 1986
- Pitcher
- Born: November 13, 1947 (age 78); Lancaster, Pennsylvania, U.S.
- Batted: Right Threw: Right

MLB debut
- June 17, 1969, for the Pittsburgh Pirates

Last MLB appearance
- July 1, 1988, for the Kansas City Royals

MLB statistics
- Win–loss record: 96–113
- Earned run average: 3.34
- Strikeouts: 940
- Saves: 218
- Stats at Baseball Reference

Teams
- Pittsburgh Pirates (1969–1970, 1972); Kansas City Royals (1973–1974); Philadelphia Phillies (1974–1978); Atlanta Braves (1978–1987); Kansas City Royals (1987–1988)

Henry Eugene Garber (born November 13, 1947) is an American former professional baseball sidearm relief pitcher who played for four Major League Baseball (MLB) organizations from 1969 to 1988.

== Playing career ==
Garber was selected by the Pittsburgh Pirates in the 20th round of the 1965 amateur draft. Over the course of his MLB career, he pitched for the Pirates, Kansas City Royals (on two occasions), Philadelphia Phillies, and Atlanta Braves. In 1977, Garber won his only postseason game, becoming the first Phillies pitcher to win a postseason game in 62 years. While pitching for the Braves against the Cincinnati Reds on August 1, 1978, Garber helped prevent Pete Rose from setting a new National League (NL) hitting streak record. With the Braves winning 16–4 in the top of the ninth inning, Rose was 0 for 4 when he came to bat with two outs. Rose struck out swinging, on a 2–2 change-up, ending the consecutive game streak still tied with Willie Keeler.

While pitching for the 1979 Braves, Garber recorded 25 saves, but also 16 losses, an unusually high number for a closer. His best season came for the 1982 Braves' NL West division-winning team. That year, Garber recorded a career-high 30 saves, along with a 8–10 won-lost record, and he finished seventh in the NL Cy Young Award balloting. Garber's most effective pitch was a change-up, which he effectively delivered from an unusual, herky-jerky motion, turning his back to the batter before delivering the ball in a side-arm, "submarine-style" manner. With 141 games saved for the Braves, Garber ranks third on the team's all-time saves list as of 2020, behind only Craig Kimbrel (186) and John Smoltz (154).

Upon his retirement following the 1988 season, Garber’s 931 career pitching appearances ranked fifth in MLB history, trailing Hoyt Wilhelm (1070), Kent Tekulve (1013), Lindy McDaniel (987), and Rollie Fingers (944).

== Personal life ==
Garber attended Elizabethtown Area High School. He went on to graduate from Elizabethtown College in 1969. Garber is a farmer in Elizabethtown, Pennsylvania, where he and his sons raise poultry for eggs, emu for emu oil, and they grow corn, wheat, soybeans, and barley. Prior to the 2009 season, he was invited by the Braves to be a guest instructor for a week during spring training, working with fellow side-armer Peter Moylan.

Garber is the Chairman of the Lancaster County Agricultural Preservation Board and is a member of the Lancaster Farmland Trust, which combined have protected more than 1,000 farms and 75,000 acres (300 km^{2}) of farmland from development, more than any other county in the United States.
