= Donnie Moore =

American baseball player (1954–1989)

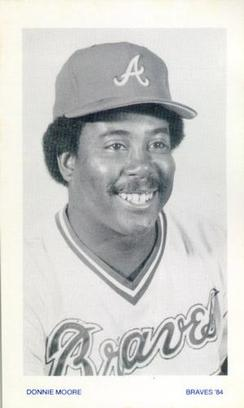
- Pitcher
- Born: February 13, 1954; Lubbock, Texas, U.S.
- Died: July 18, 1989 (aged 35); Anaheim, California, U.S.
- Batted: Left Threw: Right

MLB debut
- September 14, 1975, for the Chicago Cubs

Last MLB appearance
- August 7, 1988, for the California Angels

MLB statistics
- Win–loss record: 43–40
- Earned run average: 3.67
- Strikeouts: 416
- Saves: 89
- Stats at Baseball Reference

Teams
- Chicago Cubs (1975, 1977–1979); St. Louis Cardinals (1980); Milwaukee Brewers (1981); Atlanta Braves (1982–1984); California Angels (1985–1988)

Career highlights and awards
- All-Star (1985)

Donnie Ray Moore (February 13, 1954 – July 18, 1989) was an American relief pitcher in Major League Baseball (MLB) who played for the Chicago Cubs (1975, 1977–1979), St. Louis Cardinals (1980), Milwaukee Brewers (1981), Atlanta Braves (1982–1984) and California Angels (1985–1988). Moore is best remembered for the home run he gave up to Dave Henderson while pitching for the California Angels in Game 5 of the 1986 American League Championship Series. With only one more strike needed to clinch the team's first-ever pennant, he allowed the Boston Red Sox to come back and eventually win the game. Boston then won Games 6 and 7 to take the series. Shortly after his professional career ended, he shot his wife three times in a dispute and then committed suicide.

== Early life ==
Moore was born on February 13, 1954, in Lubbock, Texas, and was the cousin of MLB player Hubie Brooks. Moore attended Paris Junior College and Ranger College before he was selected by the Chicago Cubs in the first round of the January secondary phase of the 1973 Major League Baseball draft.

== Playing career ==
In a 13-season career, Moore posted a 43–40 record with 89 saves, 416 strikeouts, and a 3.67 earned run average in 655 innings. Moore also compiled a .281 batting average with 11 runs batted in. He was selected as an All-Star in 1985 after developing a splitter with a slider and a breaking ball.

=== Game 5 of the 1986 American League Championship Series ===
The game took place on October 12, 1986 in Anaheim. The Angels held a 3–1 series lead against the Boston Red Sox in the best-of-seven series. In the game, the Angels held a 5–2 lead going into the ninth inning. Angels starting pitcher Mike Witt allowed a two-run home run to Boston's Don Baylor to make it a 5–4 game, but got two outs to bring the Angels within an out of their first World Series in franchise history. Gary Lucas relieved Witt but hit Rich Gedman with his first pitch, and was immediately replaced by Moore.

Moore faced Dave Henderson and got two strikes on him, now putting the Angels one strike away from advancing to their first World Series. However, Henderson hit a 2–2 pitch off Moore for a home run to give the Red Sox a 6–5 lead. The Angels responded by scoring a run in the bottom of the ninth to tie the game, and threatened further by loading the bases with just one out. Boston was able to get the next two outs without allowing the Angels to score the winning run, and the game entered extra innings.

Moore remained in the game for the Angels; he was able to stifle a tenth inning Red Sox rally by getting Jim Rice to ground into a double play, but the Angels did not score in their half of the tenth. In the 11th inning, Moore allowed the first three hitters to reach base before a sacrifice fly by Henderson again gave Boston a one-run lead. The Angels were retired in order in the bottom of the 11th and lost the game, 7–6. The defeat left the Angels with a 3–2 series advantage, still with two more chances to clinch the series at Fenway Park. However, the Angels were not competitive in either game, losing by scores of 10–4 and 8–1, and Boston advanced to the World Series.

After Game 5, Moore admitted that he made a bad pitch to Henderson. "I was throwing fastballs and Henderson was fouling them off, so I went with the split-finger, thought maybe I'd catch him off guard, but it was right in his swing."

=== Later career ===
Moore was battling a shoulder injury at the time of the 1986 American League Championship Series and was never able to remain injury-free afterward. After saving nine more games in 41 appearances over the next two seasons, Moore was released by the Angels. He signed with the Kansas City Royals for the 1989 season, but played only in the minor leagues before being released in June of that year, ending his 14-year career in baseball.

== Shooting and suicide ==
On July 18, 1989, Moore had an argument with his wife Tonya and shot her three times with a .45 pistol. The incident occurred at their Anaheim Hills home, with their three children in the house at the time. Tonya Moore and daughter Demetria, then 17 years of age, fled from the house and Demetria drove her mother to the hospital. Tonya survived the shooting. Back inside the house, still in the presence of at least one of his sons, Moore then put the gun to his head and committed suicide. He was 35.

== In pop culture ==
In 2025, indie-folk artist Cousin Wolf released a song entitled "Donnie Moore" as part of an album called Nine Innings.
