= 1983 Houston Astros season =

22nd season in Major League Baseball for the Houston Astros

1983 Houston Astros
- League: National League
- Division: West
- Ballpark: Astrodome
- City: Houston, Texas
- Record: 85–77 (.525)
- Divisional place: 3rd
- Owners: John McMullen
- General managers: Al Rosen
- Managers: Bob Lillis
- Television: KTXH; HSE
- Radio: KRBE (Gene Elston, Dewayne Staats, Larry Dierker)

The 1983 Houston Astros season was the 22nd season for the Major League Baseball (MLB) franchise located in Houston, Texas, their 19th as the Astros, 22nd in the National League (NL), 15th in the NL West division, and 19th at The Astrodome. The Astros entered the season having posted a 77–85 record for fifth place and 12 games behind the division-champion Atlanta Braves.

On April 5, Joe Niekro made his second Opening Day start for Houston, who hosted the Los Angeles Dodgers but lost, 16–7. On April 27, Nolan Ryan recorded the 3,509th strikeout of his career to surpass Walter Johnson for the all-time record. In the amateur draft, Houston's first round selection was catcher Robbie Wine at eighth overall.

Shortstop Dickie Thon and pitcher Bill Dawley each represented the Astros at the MLB All-Star Game and played for the National League, the first career selection for both.

The Astros concluded the season with an 85–77 record, for third place and 6 games behind the division-champion Dodgers. Following the season, Thon and outfielder José Cruz both won their first career Silver Slugger Awards for their respective positions, also the first Astros to win the award.

== Offseason ==
- December 10, 1982: Danny Heep was traded by the Astros to the New York Mets for Mike Scott.
- January 11, 1983: Troy Afenir was drafted by the Astros in the 1st round (11th pick) of the 1983 Major League Baseball draft (secondary phase).
- March 31, 1983: Alan Knicely was traded by the Astros to the Cincinnati Reds for Bill Dawley and Tony Walker.

== Regular season ==
=== Summary ===
==== April ====
Opening Day starting lineup
Uniform	Player	Position
24	Omar Moreno	Center fielder
19	Bill Doran	Second baseman
10	Dickie Thon	Shortstop
3	Phil Garner	Third baseman
25	José Cruz	Left fielder
22	Ray Knight	First baseman
21	Terry Puhl	Right fielder
6	Luis Pujols	Catcher
36	Joe Niekro	Pitcher
Venue: Astrodome • Final Los Angeles 16, Houston 7 Sources:

Reprising Opening Day just two seasons prior, the Astros hosted the Los Angeles Dodgers, as Houston featured right-hander Joe Niekro to oppose southpaw Fernando Valenzuela. In a reversal of a 2–0 pitchers' duel that had transpired during the first iteration, neither starter fared well, yielding six runs while lasting a maximum of three innings each. While the Dodgers successfully implemented damage control, the Astros could not, as Los Angeles piled on 15 hits to fuel a 16–7 rout. Leading the way was Pedro Guerrero, who cranked a home run among three hits and six runs batted in (RBI), while finishing a double away from hitting for the cycle. The 16 runs surrendered on Opening Day was the season-most for runs allowed for the Astros. It also oriented their longest losing streak of the season, at nine games.

On April 17, Nolan Ryan struck out Andre Dawson for the 3500th strikeout in his career.

==== Nolan Ryan's career record-breaking strikeout ====
On April 27, Ryan struck out Brad Mills (Note: Mills later managed the Astros from 2010 to 2012.) of the Expos to break Walter Johnson's all time mark for strikeouts in a career. Mills was the 3,509th strikeout of Ryan's career. Ryan totaled five whiffs on the day. Phil Garner and Dickie Thon each delivered two runs batted in (RBI) in a 4–2 Astros' victory, and moved the club 1/2 game up from last place in the NL West. Omar Moreno led off the contest with a triple. Thon then swatted sacrifice fly to score Moreno, and, in the third, an RBI single. Garner later homered in the first and singled in another runner during the third.

Ryan pitched eight innings overall. Alan Ashby served as Ryan's batterymate. Frank LaCorte closed out the ninth for the save.

==== May ====
Right-hander Mike Scott debuted for Houston on May 6, a start in which he tossed four scoreless innings but yielded five walks to the Atlanta Braves. Frank DiPino (1–1), who finished the bout by tossing five perfect innings and whiffed five, earned the victory in relief as Houston won, 6–0. DiPino also hit an RBI double during the top of sixth inning. Omar Moreno collected four hits, three RBI, and a stolen base, while Dickie Thon tallied three hits, two stolen bases, and scored twice.

==== June ====
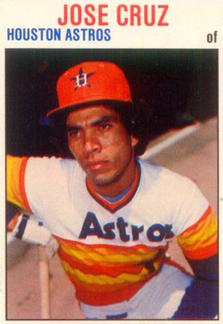
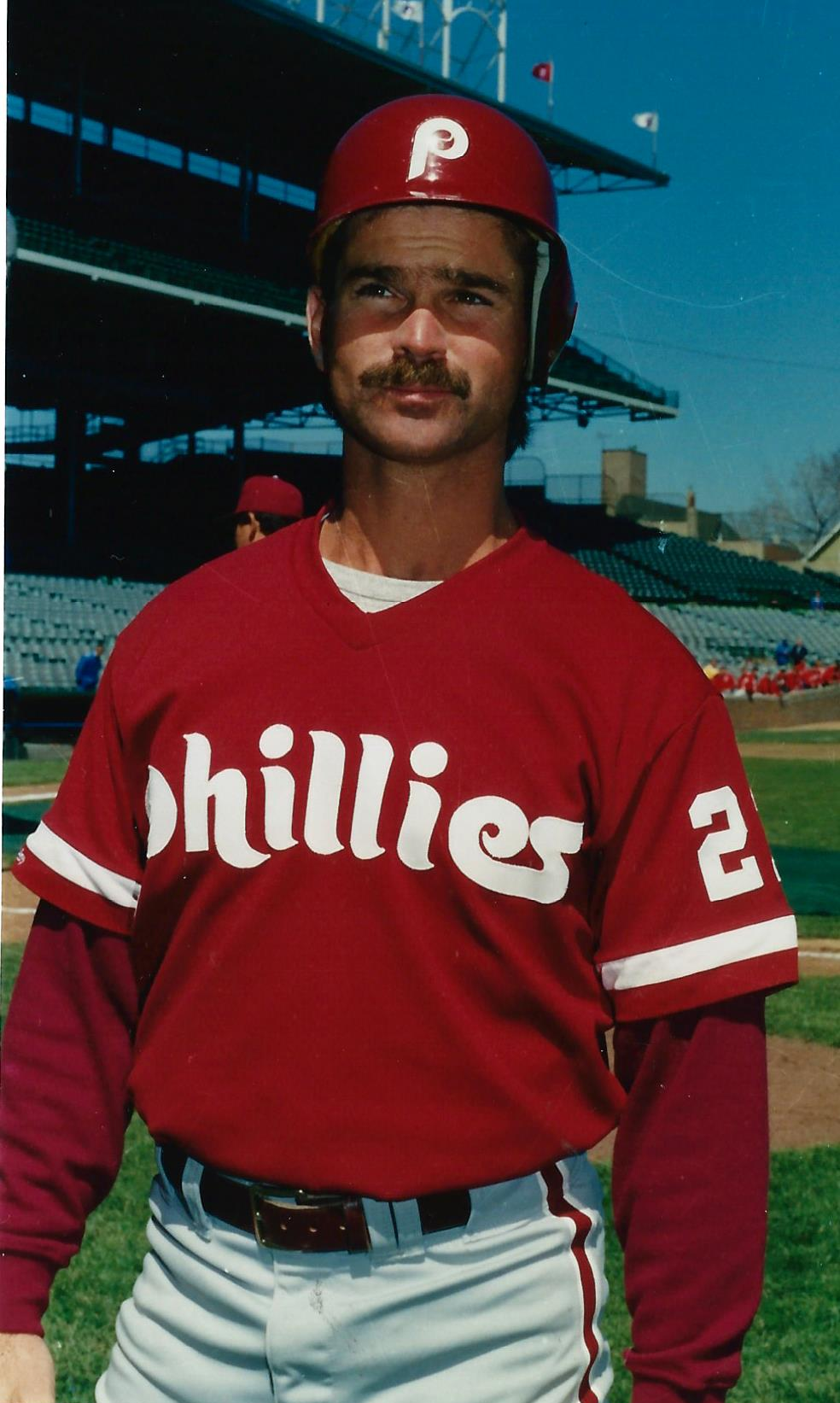
José Cruz (left) and Dickie Thon (right) won the first Silver Slugger Awards in Astros history.

On June 4, Alan Ashby homered twice, doubled and had six runs batted in (RBI) to back Mike Scott, who earned his first win as a Houston Astro. The final score was 13–0 over the Cincinnati Reds. Scott went the distance to simultaneously to garner his first complete game and shutout as an Astro.

Nolan Ryan went the distance on June 12, differentiated as the first complete game of his career without having issued any base on balls, and collectively, the power pitcher's 167th complete game. (Note: Ryan produced his next complete game with no walks on September 8, 1988.) (Note: Nolan Ryan, for single games, in complete games, in the regular season, sorted by ascending bases on balls.) Ryan tossed a five-hit, 2–0 shutout masterpiece of the San Diego Padres in which he induced 11 whiffs and earned a game score of 88. Bill Doran plated Ashby with a single during the bottom of the second, and, in the third, Cruz doubled in Thon, who had two hits. Puhl also added two hits.

Shortstop Dickie Thon homered twice off Padres starter Eric Show on June 17. This generated enough offense for Ryan, as he struck out six in a 4–1 win. Ryan also ended the contest just one strikeout behind Philadelphia Phillies starter Steve Carlton for the all-time strikeout race.

==== July ====
On July 10, Cruz collected his 10th career four-hit game, slashing two doubles with two RBI. This was his first four-hit game of the season. Cruz doubled twice, scored twice, and drove in two, but the New York Mets overcame Houston, 7–5. Terry Puhl added three hits while Thon and Phil Garner each had two. Darryl Strawberry hit his ninth home run for New York.

On July 20, Philadelphia Phillies rookie Charles Hudson took a no-hit bid into the ninth inning versus Houston until Craig Reynolds singled with one out. Dickie Thon (13) and Denny Walling (1) followed with successive home runs to next end the shutout bid. However, Hudson (3–3) whiffed Kevin Bass to end the game and earn the complete game win as Philadelphia cruised, 10–3.

On July 22, Cruz was 4-for-5 for his 11th career four-hit game and second of the campaign. He also scored twice. Cruz' effort led an 11–8 triumph over the Montreal Expos. Omar Moreno, Terry Puhl, and Denny Walling each drove in a pair. The Astros plated 5 in the top of the ninth to pull away for the win. Dave Smith (3–1) got the final out of the eighth to earn the victory, while Bill Dawley (8) closed out the ninth for the save.

==== August ====
Nolan Ryan hurled his ninth career complete game one-hitter on August 3, his first since August 11, 1982. Ryan issued six base on balls and earned a game score of 89. Dickie Thon tripled in Terry Puhl during the top of the first for the only run of the contest. The only blemish to subdue Ryan's bid for the no-hitter was Tim Flannery slow roller during the third frame.

On August 11, José Cruz went 2-for-4—including a triple—and produced his first game of the season with at least four RBI. Cruz cleared a bases-loaded setup during the bottom of the eighth inning with his eighth three-bagger, providing extra insurance runs to push the Astros' lead to 5–1, which remained the final score. Mike Scott (6–4) scattered five hits over seven innings to pick up the victory. Dave Smith closed out with two scoreless frames to convert the save (6).

On August 15, Cruz went 3-for-5 and launched his fifth career multi-home run game, and his sixth career with 5 RBI.

Emerging with the nightcap of doubleheader on August 23, José Cruz amassed a career-best 19-game hitting streak through September 12, which, once concluded, progressed into a career-best 29-game on-base scintilla until September 23. During the 29-game span, Cruz hit for a .364 batting average, .412 on-base percentage (OBP) and .477 slugging percentage (SLG), garnering 39 hits and 9 bases on balls (BB). (Note: José Cruz, longest streak of consecutive games, in the regular season, requiring times on base ≥ 1, sorted by most games matching criteria..) Cruz' hitting streak was the eighth in club history to endure at minimum 19 outings, and the longest by an Astros player since Dickie Thon corralled 21 straight, July 24–August 14 during the previous campaign.

Cruz collected two safeties during that August 23 contest versus the Pittsburgh Pirates. Starter Joe Niekro induced two crucial, inning-ending ground ball double plays from Pirates first baseman Jason Thompson—during the third and fifth frames. During the top of the third, Terry Puhl doubled in Bill Doran, and Thon singled in Puhl to supply all of Houston' offense. Niekro (11–10) tossed six innings with one run allowed to earn the victory and quality start, while Bill Dawley followed with three clean innings to earn his 12th save.

==== September ====
On September 13, José Cruz received a hit by pitch for the seventh time—third as an Astro—and final time in his major league career. The seven hits by pitch set a record for fewest among hitters with at least 8,000 plate appearances (PA, a milestone he later reached in 1986), surpassing Luke Appling who recorded 11 in over 10,000 PA in a career spanning 1930 to 1950. (Note: Later equalled by Rubén Sierra. Criteria:For combined seasons, in the regular season, requiring Hit By Pitch ≤ 15 and Plate Appearances ≥ 8000, sorted by ascending Hit By Pitch.)

Cruz collected four hits on September 16, his third four-hit contest of the campaign, and 12th of his career. He also doubled a pilfered a base. Bill Doran led the game off with a triple, while Terry Puhl and Cruz both followed with doubles to give Houston a 2–0 lead over the Cincinnati Reds. The Astros' momentum did not endure, however, as the Reds won easily, 8–3.

On September 18, Cruz posted his 14th career contest with at least three walks, otherwise going 0-for-2.

On September 20, Cruz realized his third career six-RBI game, going 2-for-3 with an intentional base on balls. With Houston up 5–0, Cruz launched his second career grand slam off Burt Hooton during the second inning, which only got things warmed up as Houston ran away with a 15–2 drubbing of the Los Angeles Dodgers. Denny Walling also had a big game, going 3-for-5 with three RBI, and doubled twice. Nolan Ryan (14–8) allowed four hits and two runs over six innings with seven strikeouts, and Jeff Heathcock closed out the last three innings for his first save. Cruz extended his own club record of remaining as the Astros' sole hitter with more than one 6 RBI game. (Note: In 1998, both Jeff Bagwell and Craig Biggio became the next Astros to record their second 6-RBI games. Criteria: Number of games in a career player meets criteria, playing for HOU, in the regular season, requiring Runs Batted In ≥ 6, sorted by descending instances.)

==== Performance overview ====
Houston concluded the 1983 season with an 85–77 (.525) record, in third place in the NL West divions and six games behind the division-champion Dodgers. The Astros also had the fourth-best record in the National League. For the third instance in franchise annals, the club reached the 85-win threshold (previously, the 1979 and 1980 squads), and for the fifth time, a .525 winning percentage—including the former, along with the 1972 and 1981 strike-shortened campaigns. Moreover, since 1972, this was the eighth campaign with a record at .500 or above.

Left fielder José Cruz remained in contention for the batting championship until the final day, winding up third. Cruz led the National League in hits (189), (Note: Tied with Andre Dawson of the Montreal Exos.) becoming the first Astro to accomplish this feat.

For the seventh time, an Astros pitcher claimed the title for hits per nine innings surrendered: Nolan Ryan at 6.143 H/9. The major league leader in this category for the third consecutive season (all as an Astro), Ryan followed Don Wilson in 1971 (6.549 H/9), and J. R. Richard (thrice—6.835 in 1976, 6.278 in 1978, and 6.773 in 1979).

Frank DiPino (20 saves) and Bill Dawley (14) both surpassed Dave Smith's team record of 10 saves by a rookie, which he established in 1980. In 1994, John Hudek converted 16 saves to overtake second place among rookie pitchers. (Note: For single seasons, playing for HOU, a rookie, in the regular season, requiring saves ≥ 5, sorted by descending Saves.)

Cruz and Thon both won their first career Silver Slugger Awards for their respective positions, while becoming the first Astros to receive the honor.

Moreover, Cruz won his third Houston Astros' team Most Valuable Player Award (MVP), having previously received the honor for the 1977 and 1980 campaigns. As a third-time winner, Cruz surpassed Rusty Staub for the club record, who won in 1966 and 1967.

=== League standings ===
==== National League West ====
NL West
Team	W	L	Pct.	GB	Home	Road
Los Angeles Dodgers	91	71	.562	—	48‍–‍32	43‍–‍39
Atlanta Braves	88	74	.543	3	46‍–‍34	42‍–‍40
Houston Astros	85	77	.525	6	46‍–‍36	39‍–‍41
San Diego Padres	81	81	.500	10	47‍–‍34	34‍–‍47
San Francisco Giants	79	83	.488	12	43‍–‍38	36‍–‍45
Cincinnati Reds	74	88	.457	17	36‍–‍45	38‍–‍43

==== Record versus opponents ====
National League

1983 National League record Sources:
Team	ATL	CHC	CIN	HOU	LAD	MON	NYM	PHI	PIT	SD	SF	STL
Atlanta	—	5–7	12–6	11–7	7–11	7–5	8–4	7–5	6–6	9–9	9–9	7–5
Chicago	7–5	—	4–8	5–7	6–6	7–11	9–9	5–13	9–9	5–7	4–8	10–8
Cincinnati	6–12	8–4	—	5–13	7–11	4–8	7–5	6–6	6–6	9–9	10–8	6–6
Houston	7–11	7–5	13–5	—	6–12	8–4	9–3	4–8	6–6	11–7	12–6	2–10
Los Angeles	11–7	6–6	11–7	12–6	—	7–5	7–5	11–1	6–6	6–12–1	5–13	9–3
Montreal	5–7	11–7	8–4	4–8	5–7	—	8–10	8–10–1	8–10	8–4	8–4	9–9
New York	4–8	9–9	5–7	3–9	5–7	10–8	—	6–12	9–9	6–6	5–7	6–12
Philadelphia	5–7	13–5	6–6	8–4	1–11	10–8–1	12–6	—	11–7	5–7	5–7	14–4
Pittsburgh	6–6	9–9	6–6	6–6	6–6	10–8	9–9	7–11	—	9–3	6–6	10–8
San Diego	9–9	7–5	9–9	7–11	12–6–1	4–8	6–6	7–5	3–9	—	11–7	6–6
San Francisco	9–9	8–4	8–10	6–12	13–5	4–8	7–5	7–5	6–6	7–11	—	4–8
St. Louis	5–7	8–10	6–6	10–2	3–9	9–9	12–6	4–14	8–10	6–6	8–4	—

=== Notable transactions ===
- June 6, 1983: Robbie Wine was drafted by the Astros in the 1st round (8th pick) of the 1983 Major League Baseball draft.
- June 17, 1983: Danny Boone was released by the Astros.

=== Roster ===
1983 Houston Astros
Roster
Pitchers: 46 Bill Dawley; 11 Frank DiPino; 31 Jeff Heathcock; 39 Bob Knepper; 27 Frank LaCorte; 51 Mike LaCoss; 53 Mike Madden; 36 Joe Niekro; 48 Vern Ruhle; 34 Nolan Ryan; 33 Mike Scott; 45 Dave Smith; 52 Julio Solano	Catchers: 14 Alan Ashby; 20 George Bjorkman; 4 John Mizerock; 6 Luis Pujols; Infielders: 19 Bill Doran; 3 Phil Garner; 22 Ray Knight; 1 Bert Peña; 12 Craig Reynolds; 16 Harry Spilman; 10 Dickie Thon; 38 Tim Tolman; 29 Denny Walling	Outfielders: 8 Kevin Bass; 25 José Cruz; 26 Scott Loucks; 24 Omar Moreno; 28 Jerry Mumphrey; 21 Terry Puhl; 30 Tony Scott	Manager: 5 Bob Lillis; Coaches: 2 Cot Deal (Outfield/Defensive Coordinator); 15 Denis Menke; 55 Les Moss; 43 Don Leppert; 54 Jerry Walker

== Game log ==
=== Regular season ===
1983 regular season game log: 85–77 (home: 46–36; away: 39–41)
April: 8–14 (home: 5–10; away: 3–4)

#	Date	Time (CT)	Opponent	Score	Win	Loss	Save	Time of Game	Attendance	Record	Box/ Streak
1	April 5		Dodgers								
2	April 6		Dodgers								
3	April 7		Pirates								
4	April 8		Pirates								
5	April 9		Pirates								
6	April 10		Pirates								
7	April 11		@ Dodgers								
8	April 12		@ Dodgers								
9	April 13		@ Dodgers								
10	April 15		Expos								
11	April 16		Expos								
12	April 17		Expos								
13	April 19		Reds								
14	April 20		Reds								
15	April 21		Reds								
16	April 22		Phillies								
17	April 23		Phillies								
18	April 24		Phillies								
19	April 26		@ Expos								
20	April 27		@ Expos								
21	April 29		@ Phillies								
22	April 30		@ Phillies								

May: 14–14 (home: 7–7; away: 7–7)

#	Date	Time (CT)	Opponent	Score	Win	Loss	Save	Time of Game	Attendance	Record	Box/ Streak
23	May 1		@ Phillies								
24	May 2		@ Mets								
25	May 3		@ Mets								
26	May 4		@ Mets								
27	May 5		@ Braves								
28	May 6		@ Braves								
29	May 7		@ Braves								
30	May 8		@ Braves								
31	May 9		Mets								
32	May 10		Mets								
33	May 11		Mets								
34	May 12		Braves								
35	May 13		Braves								
36	May 14		Braves								
37	May 15		Braves								
38	May 17		@ Cardinals								
39	May 18		@ Cardinals								
40	May 20		@ Pirates								
41	May 21		@ Pirates								
—	May 22		@ Pirates	**Postponed (Rain)** (Makeup date: August 23)							
42	May 23		Cubs								
43	May 24		Cubs								
44	May 25		Cubs								
45	May 26		Cardinals								
46	May 27		Cardinals								
47	May 28		Cardinals								
48	May 29		Cardinals								
49	May 30		@ Cubs								
50	May 31		@ Cubs								

June: 15–11 (home: 10–3; away: 5–8)

#	Date	Time (CT)	Opponent	Score	Win	Loss	Save	Time of Game	Attendance	Record	Box/ Streak
51	June 1		@ Cubs								
52	June 3		@ Reds								
53	June 4		@ Reds								
54	June 5		@ Reds								
55	June 7		Giants								
56	June 8		Giants								
57	June 9		Giants								
58	June 10		Padres								
59	June 11		Padres								
60	June 12		Padres								
61	June 13		Padres								
62	June 14		@ Giants								
63	June 15		@ Giants								
64	June 16		@ Giants								
65	June 17		@ Padres								
66	June 18		@ Padres								
67	June 19		@ Padres								
68	June 20		Braves								
69	June 21		Braves								
70	June 22		Braves								
71	June 24		@ Dodgers								
72	June 25		@ Dodgers								
73	June 26		@ Dodgers								
74	June 28		@ Braves								
75	June 29		@ Braves								
76	June 30		@ Braves								

July: 15–11 (home: 10–6; away: 5–5)

#	Date	Time (CT)	Opponent	Score	Win	Loss	Save	Time of Game	Attendance	Record	Box/ Streak
77	July 1		Dodgers								
78	July 2		Dodgers								
79	July 3		Dodgers								
80	July 4		Dodgers								
**54th All-Star Game in Chicago, Illinois**
81	July 8		@ Mets								
82	July 9		@ Mets								
83	July 10		@ Mets								
84	July 12		Expos								
85	July 13		Expos								
86	July 14		Expos								
87	July 15		Mets								
88	July 16		Mets								
89	July 17		Mets								
90	July 18		@ Phillies								
91	July 19		@ Phillies								
92	July 20		@ Phillies								
93	July 21		@ Expos								
94	July 22		@ Expos								
95	July 23		@ Expos								
96	July 24		@ Expos								
97	July 26		Phillies								
98	July 27		Phillies								
99	July 28		Phillies								
100	July 29		Reds								
101	July 30		Reds								
102	July 31		Reds								

August: 18–12 (home: 8–4; away: 10–8)

#	Date	Time (CT)	Opponent	Score	Win	Loss	Save	Time of Game	Attendance	Record	Box/ Streak
103	August 1		@ Padres								
104	August 2		@ Padres								
105	August 3		@ Padres								
106	August 4		@ Padres								
107	August 5		@ Giants								
108	August 6		@ Giants								
109	August 7		@ Giants								
110	August 9		Padres								
111	August 10		Padres								
112	August 11		Padres								
113	August 12		Giants								
114	August 13		Giants								
115	August 14		Giants								
116	August 15		@ Reds								
117	August 16		@ Reds								
118	August 17		@ Reds								
119	August 18		@ Cardinals								
120	August 19		@ Cardinals								
121	August 20		@ Cardinals								
122	August 21		@ Cardinals								
123 (1)	August 23		@ Pirates								
124 (2)	August 23		@ Pirates								
125	August 24		@ Pirates								
126	August 25		@ Pirates								
127	August 26		Cubs								
128	August 27		Cubs								
129	August 28		Cubs								
130	August 29		Cardinals								
131	August 30		Cardinals								
132	August 31		Pirates								

September: 14–14 (home: 7–6; away: 7–8)

#	Date	Time (CT)	Opponent	Score	Win	Loss	Save	Time of Game	Attendance	Record	Box/ Streak
133	September 1		Pirates								
134	September 2		@ Cubs								
135	September 3		@ Cubs								
136	September 4		@ Cubs								
137	September 5		@ Braves								
—	September 6		@ Braves	**Postponed (Rain; Site change)** (Makeup date: September 28)							
138	September 7		@ Padres								
139	September 8		@ Padres								
140	September 9		@ Giants								
141	September 10		@ Giants								
142	September 11		@ Giants								
143	September 13		Dodgers								
144	September 14		Dodgers								
145	September 15		Dodgers								
146	September 16		@ Reds								
147	September 17		@ Reds								
148	September 18		@ Reds								
149	September 19		@ Dodgers								
150	September 20		@ Dodgers								
151	September 21		@ Dodgers								
152	September 23		Giants								
153	September 24		Giants								
154	September 25		Giants								
155	September 26		Padres								
156	September 27		Padres								
157 (1)	September 28		Braves								
158 (2)	September 28		Braves								
159	September 29		Braves								
160	September 30		Reds								

October: 1–1 (home: 1–1; away: 0–0)

#	Date	Time (CT)	Opponent	Score	Win	Loss	Save	Time of Game	Attendance	Record	Box/ Streak
161	October 1		Reds								
162	October 2		Reds								

Legend: = Win = Loss = Postponement
Bold = Astros team member

== Player statistics ==
Table legend
*	Left-handed batter or pitcher	League leader (Bold: MLB leader)
#	Switch hitter	League top ten
	Leader in appearances at position	Team leader

=== Batting ===
Statistics legend
⌖	Position	AB	At bats	2B	Doubles	RBI	Runs batted in	SB	Stolen bases	SLG	Slugging percentage
G	Games played	R	Runs scored	3B	Triples	BB	Bases on balls	AVG	Batting average	OPS	On-base plus slugging percentage
PA	Plate appearances	H	Hits	HR	Home runs	SO	Strikeouts	OBP	On-base percentage

Individual batting results
⌖	Player	G	PA	AB	R	H	2B	3B	HR	RBI	SB	BB	SO	AVG	OBP	SLG	OPS
C	Alan Ashby^{#}	87	311	275	31	63	18	1	8	34	0	31	38	.229	.303	.389	.692
1B	Ray Knight	145	567	507	43	154	36	4	9	70	0	42	62	.304	.355	.444	.799
2B	Bill Doran^{#}	154	629	535	70	145	12	7	8	39	12	86	67	.271	.371	.364	.736
3B	Phil Garner	154	644	567	76	135	24	2	14	79	18	63	84	.238	.317	.362	.678
SS	Dickie Thon	154	686	619	81	177	28	9	20	79	34	54	73	.286	.341	.457	.798
LF	José Cruz*	160	664	594	85	189	28	8	14	92	30	65	86	.318	.385	.463	.848
CF	Omar Moreno	97	429	405	48	98	12	11	0	25	30	22	72	.242	.282	.326	.608
RF	Terry Puhl*	137	512	465	66	136	25	7	8	44	24	36	48	.292	.342	.428	.771
RF	Kevin Bass^{#}	88	206	195	25	46	7	3	2	18	2	6	27	.236	.257	.333	.591
OF	Tony Scott^{#}	80	202	186	20	42	6	1	2	17	5	11	39	.226	.264	.301	.565
CF	Jerry Mumphrey^{#}	44	167	143	17	48	10	2	1	17	5	22	23	.336	.425	.455	.880
UT	Denny Walling*	100	152	135	24	40	5	3	3	19	2	15	16	.296	.364	.444	.809
MI	Craig Reynolds	65	104	98	10	21	3	0	1	6	0	6	10	.214	.260	.276	.535
C	John Mizerock	33	100	85	8	13	4	1	1	10	0	12	15	.153	.263	.259	.521
C	Luis Pujols	40	97	87	4	17	2	0	0	12	0	5	14	.195	.234	.217	.462
C	George Bjorkman	29	93	75	8	17	4	0	2	14	0	16	29	.227	.370	.360	.730
UT	Harry Spilman*	42	85	78	7	13	3	0	1	9	0	5	12	.167	.212	.244	.455
UT	Tim Tolman	43	63	56	4	11	4	0	2	10	0	6	9	.196	.270	.375	.645
OF	Scott Loucks	7	15	14	2	3	0	0	0	0	2	1	4	.214	.267	.214	.481
SS	Bert Peña	4	10	8	0	1	0	0	0	0	0	2	2	.125	.300	.125	.425
	**Pitcher totals**		437	375	14	43	8	1	1	21	0	11	139	.115	.141	.149	.290
**Team totals**		**162**	**6173**	**5502**	**643**	**1412**	**239**	**60**	**97**	**615**	**164**	**517**	**869**	**.257**	**.320**	**.375**	**.695**

=== Pitching ===
Statistics legend
⌖	Pitching role	ERA	Earned run average	GF	Games finished	IP	Innings pitched	ER	Earned runs allowed	WHIP	Walks plus hits per inning pitched
W	Wins	G	Games pitched	SV	Saves	H	Hits allowed	BB	Base on balls	K/BB	Strikeout-to-walk ratio
L	Losses	GS	Games started	HD	Holds	R	Runs allowed	SO	Strikeouts

Individual pitching results
⌖	Player	W	L	ERA	G	GS	GF	CG	ShO	SV	IP	H	ER	BB	SO	WHIP	K/BB
SP	Joe Niekro	15	14	3.48	38	**38**	0	9	1	0	263.2	238	102	101	152	1.286	1.50
SP	Bob Knepper*	6	13	3.19	35	29	2	4	3	0	203.2	202	72	71	125	1.345	1.76
SP	Nolan Ryan	14	9	2.98	29	29	0	5	2	0	196.1	134	65	101	183	1.197	1.61
SP	Mike Scott	10	6	3.72	24	24	0	2	2	0	145.0	143	60	46	73	1.303	1.59
CL	Frank DiPino*	3	4	2.65	53	0	32	0	0	20	71.1	52	21	20	67	1.009	3.35
SU	Bill Dawley	6	6	2.82	48	0	37	0	0	14	79.2	51	25	22	60	0.916	2.73
SU	Dave Smith	3	1	3.10	42	0	24	0	0	6	72.2	72	25	36	41	1.486	1.14
RP	Frank LaCorte	4	4	5.06	37	0	19	0	0	3	53.1	35	30	28	48	1.181	1.71
LR	Vern Ruhle	8	5	3.69	41	9	11	0	0	3	114.2	107	47	36	43	1.247	1.19
SW	Mike LaCoss	5	7	4.43	38	17	6	2	0	1	138.0	142	68	56	53	1.435	0.95
SW	Mike Madden*	9	5	3.14	28	13	7	0	0	0	94.2	76	33	45	44	1.278	0.98
SP	Jeff Heathcock	2	1	3.21	6	3	2	0	0	1	28.0	19	10	4	12	0.821	3.00
RP	Julio Solano	0	2	6.00	4	0	0	0	0	0	6.0	5	4	4	3	1.500	0.75
**Team totals**		**85**	**77**	**3.45**	**162**	**162**	**140**	**22**	**8**	**48**	**1466 1/3**	**1276**	**562**	**570**	**904**	**1.259**	**1.59**

== Awards and achievements ==
=== Grand slams ===
No.	Date	Astros batter	Venue	Inning	Pitcher	Opposing team	Box
1	September 20	José Cruz	Dodger Stadium	2	Burt Hooton	Los Angeles Dodgers	

=== Awards ===
1983 Houston Astros award winners
Name of award		Recipient	Ref.
Baseball Digest Rookie All-Star	Second baseman	Bill Doran	
Houston Astros Most Valuable Player (MVP)		José Cruz	
Hutch Award		Ray Knight	
MLB All-Star Game	Reserve pitcher	Bill Dawley	
MLB All-Star Game	Reserve infielder	Dickie Thon	
Silver Slugger Award	Shortstop	Dickie Thon	
Silver Slugger Award	Outfielder	José Cruz	
Topps All-Star Rookie Team	Second baseman	Bill Doran	

Other awards results

Name of award	Voting recipient(s) (Team)	Ref.
NL Cy Young Award	1st—Denny (PHI) • 9th—Ryan (HOU)	
NL Most Valuable Player	1st—Murphy (ATL) • 6th—Cruz (HOU) • 7th—Thon (HOU)	
NL Rookie of the Year	1st—Strawberry (NYM) • 5th—Doran (HOU) • 6th—DiPino (HOU)	

=== League leaders ===
Batting leaders

- Hits: José Cruz (189)

Pitching leaders

- Games started: Joe Niekro (38—led MLB)
- Hits per nine innings pitched (H/9): Nolan Ryan (6.1—led MLB)

== Minor league system ==
Level	Team	League	Manager
AAA	Tucson Toros	Pacific Coast League	Matt Galante
AA	Columbus Astros	Southern League	Jack Hiatt
A	Daytona Beach Astros	Florida State League	Dave Cripe
A	Asheville Tourists	South Atlantic League	Tom Spencer
A-Short Season	Auburn Astros	New York–Penn League	Bob Hartsfield
Rookie	GCL Astros	Gulf Coast League	José Tartabull

== See also ==
- List of Major League Baseball individual streaks
- List of Major League Baseball titles leaders
