= 1983 Cincinnati Reds season =

1983 Cincinnati Reds
- League: National League
- Division: West
- Ballpark: Riverfront Stadium
- City: Cincinnati
- Record: 74–88 (.457)
- Divisional place: 6th
- Owners: William & James Williams
- General managers: Dick Wagner, Bob Howsam
- Managers: Russ Nixon
- Television: WLWT (Ray Lane, Ken Wilson, Dick Carlson)
- Radio: WLW (Marty Brennaman, Joe Nuxhall)

The 1983 Cincinnati Reds season was the 114th season for the franchise in Major League Baseball, and their 14th and 13th full season at Riverfront Stadium. The Cincinnati Reds improved from their 61–101 record from the previous season to finish at 74–88, but failed to win the National League West and missed the postseason for the 4th consecutive season. It was also Johnny Bench's last season as a Red.

== Offseason ==
- October 15, 1982: Ted Power was acquired by the Reds from the Los Angeles Dodgers for Mike Ramsey and cash.
- November 15, 1982: Clint Hurdle was released by the Reds.
- December 16, 1982: Tom Seaver was traded by the Reds to the New York Mets for Charlie Puleo, Lloyd McClendon, and Jason Felice (minors).
- January 11, 1983: Tracy Jones was drafted by the Reds in the 1st round (1st pick) of the secondary phase of the 1983 Major League Baseball draft.
- January 20, 1983: Danny Tartabull was chosen from the Reds by the Seattle Mariners as a free agent compensation pick.
- March 31, 1983: Bill Dawley and Tony Walker were traded by the Reds to the Houston Astros for Alan Knicely.

== Regular season ==
=== Season standings ===
NL West
Team	W	L	Pct.	GB	Home	Road
Los Angeles Dodgers	91	71	.562	—	48‍–‍32	43‍–‍39
Atlanta Braves	88	74	.543	3	46‍–‍34	42‍–‍40
Houston Astros	85	77	.525	6	46‍–‍36	39‍–‍41
San Diego Padres	81	81	.500	10	47‍–‍34	34‍–‍47
San Francisco Giants	79	83	.488	12	43‍–‍38	36‍–‍45
Cincinnati Reds	74	88	.457	17	36‍–‍45	38‍–‍43

=== Record vs. opponents ===
1983 National League record Sources:
Team	ATL	CHC	CIN	HOU	LAD	MON	NYM	PHI	PIT	SD	SF	STL
Atlanta	—	5–7	12–6	11–7	7–11	7–5	8–4	7–5	6–6	9–9	9–9	7–5
Chicago	7–5	—	4–8	5–7	6–6	7–11	9–9	5–13	9–9	5–7	4–8	10–8
Cincinnati	6–12	8–4	—	5–13	7–11	4–8	7–5	6–6	6–6	9–9	10–8	6–6
Houston	7–11	7–5	13–5	—	6–12	8–4	9–3	4–8	6–6	11–7	12–6	2–10
Los Angeles	11–7	6–6	11–7	12–6	—	7–5	7–5	11–1	6–6	6–12–1	5–13	9–3
Montreal	5–7	11–7	8–4	4–8	5–7	—	8–10	8–10–1	8–10	8–4	8–4	9–9
New York	4–8	9–9	5–7	3–9	5–7	10–8	—	6–12	9–9	6–6	5–7	6–12
Philadelphia	5-7	13–5	6–6	8–4	1–11	10–8–1	12–6	—	11–7	5–7	5–7	14–4
Pittsburgh	6–6	9–9	6–6	6–6	6–6	10–8	9–9	7–11	—	9–3	6–6	10–8
San Diego	9–9	7–5	9–9	7–11	12–6–1	4–8	6–6	7–5	3–9	—	11–7	6–6
San Francisco	9–9	8–4	8–10	6–12	13–5	4–8	7–5	7–5	6–6	7–11	—	4–8
St. Louis	5–7	8–10	6–6	10–2	3–9	9–9	12–6	4–14	8–10	6–6	8–4	—

=== Notable transactions ===
- May 9, 1983: Rafael Landestoy was traded by the Reds to the Los Angeles Dodgers for John Franco and Brett Wise (minors).
- June 6, 1983: 1983 Major League Baseball draft
  - Chris Sabo was drafted by the Reds in the 2nd round.
  - Joe Oliver was drafted by the Reds in the 2nd round.
- June 30, 1983: Wayne Krenchicki was traded by the Reds to the Detroit Tigers for Pat Underwood.
- September 27, 1983: Greg Harris was selected off waivers from the Reds by the Montreal Expos.

=== Roster ===
1983 Cincinnati Reds
Roster
Pitchers: 38 Bruce Berenyi; 42 Keefe Cato; 32 Rich Gale; 37 Greg Harris; 45 Ben Hayes; 47 Tom Hume; 50 Brad Lesley; 35 Frank Pastore; 48 Ted Power; 49 Joe Price; 25 Charlie Puleo; 46,56 Jeff Russell; 34 Bill Scherrer; 36 Mario Soto	Catchers: 9 Dann Bilardello; 4 Steve Christmas; 4 Alan Knicely; 29 Alex Treviño; Infielders: 15 Skeeter Barnes; 5 Johnny Bench; 13 Dave Concepción; 22 Dan Driessen; 12,15 Nick Esasky; 10,59 Tom Foley; 12,15 Wayne Krenchicki; 8 Rafael Landestoy; 16 Ron Oester; 17 Kelly Paris	Outfielders: 28 César Cedeño; 21 Paul Householder; 53 Jeff Jones; 20,21 Eddie Milner; 2 Gary Redus; 26 Duane Walker; 30 Dallas Williams	Manager: 7 Russ Nixon; Coaches: 6 Bill Fischer; 19 Tommy Helms; 11 Ron Plaza; 3 George Scherger

== Player stats ==
=== Batting ===
==== Starters by position ====
Note: Pos = Position; G = Games played; AB = At bats; H = Hits; Avg. = Batting average; HR = Home runs; RBI = Runs batted in

Pos	Player	G	AB	H	Avg.	HR	RBI
C	Dann Bilardello	109	298	71	.238	9	38
1B	Dan Driessen	122	386	107	.277	12	57
2B	Ron Oester	157	549	145	.264	11	58
SS	Dave Concepción	143	528	123	.233	1	47
3B	Nick Esasky	85	302	80	.265	12	46
LF	Gary Redus	125	453	112	.247	17	51
CF	Eddie Milner	146	502	131	.261	9	33
RF	César Cedeño	98	332	77	.232	9	39

==== Other batters ====
Note: G = Games played; AB = At bats; H = Hits; Avg. = Batting average; HR = Home runs; RBI = Runs batted in

Player	G	AB	H	Avg.	HR	RBI
Paul Householder	123	380	97	.255	6	43
Johnny Bench	110	310	79	.255	12	54
Duane Walker	109	225	53	.236	2	29
Alex Treviño	74	167	36	.216	1	13
Kelly Paris	56	120	30	.250	0	7
Alan Knicely	59	98	22	.224	2	10
Tom Foley	68	98	20	.204	0	9
Wayne Krenchicki	51	77	21	.273	0	11
Jeff Jones	16	44	10	.227	0	5
Dallas Williams	18	36	2	.056	0	1
Skeeter Barnes	15	34	7	.206	1	4
Steve Christmas	9	17	1	.059	0	1
Rafael Landestoy	7	5	0	.000	0	0

=== Pitching ===
==== Starting pitchers ====
Note: G = Games pitched; IP = Innings pitched; W = Wins; L = Losses; ERA = Earned run average; SO = Strikeouts

Player	G	IP	W	L	ERA	SO
Mario Soto	34	273.2	17	13	2.70	242
Bruce Berenyi	32	186.1	9	14	3.86	151
Frank Pastore	36	184.1	9	12	4.88	93
Joe Price	21	144.0	10	6	2.88	83
Charlie Puleo	27	143.2	6	12	4.89	71
Jeff Russell	10	68.1	4	5	3.03	40

==== Other pitchers ====
Note: G = Games pitched; IP = Innings pitched; W = Wins; L = Losses; ERA = Earned run average; SO = Strikeouts

Player	G	IP	W	L	ERA	SO
Ted Power	49	111.0	5	6	4.54	57
Rich Gale	33	89.2	4	6	5.82	53

==== Relief pitchers ====
Note: G = Games pitched; W = Wins; L = Losses; SV = Saves; ERA = Earned run average; SO = Strikeouts

Player	G	W	L	SV	ERA	SO
Bill Scherrer	73	2	3	10	2.74	57
Ben Hayes	60	4	6	7	6.49	44
Tom Hume	48	3	5	9	4.77	34
Brad Lesley	5	0	0	0	2.16	5
Keefe Cato	4	1	0	0	2.45	3
Greg Harris	1	0	0	0	27.00	1

== Farm system ==
Level	Team	League	Manager
AAA	Indianapolis Indians	American Association	Roy Hartsfield
AA	Waterbury Reds	Eastern League	Jim Lett
A	Tampa Tarpons	Florida State League	Jim Hoff
A	Cedar Rapids Reds	Midwest League	Bruce Kimm
A-Short Season	Eugene Emeralds	Northwest League	Sam Mejías
Rookie	Billings Mustangs	Pioneer League	Marc Bombard

LEAGUE CHAMPIONS: Billings
