= 1983 San Francisco Giants season =

1983 San Francisco Giants
- League: National League
- Division: West
- Ballpark: Candlestick Park
- City: San Francisco, California
- Owners: Bob Lurie
- General managers: Tom Haller
- Managers: Frank Robinson
- Television: KTVU (Hank Greenwald, Gary Park)
- Radio: KNBR (Hank Greenwald, David Glass); SP Radio (Tito Fuentes, Ramón Martínez)

The 1983 San Francisco Giants season was the Giants' 101st season in Major League Baseball, their 26th season in San Francisco since their move from New York following the 1957 season, and their 24th at Candlestick Park. The team finished in fifth place in the National League West with a 79–83 record, 12 games behind the Los Angeles Dodgers.

== Offseason ==
- October 15, 1982: Bill Bordley was released by the Giants.
- October 15, 1982: Alan Hargesheimer was traded by the Giants to the Chicago Cubs for Herman Segelke.
- December 14, 1982: Joe Morgan and Al Holland were traded by the Giants to the Philadelphia Phillies for Mike Krukow, Mark Davis, and Charles Penigar (minors).
- February 7, 1983: Joel Youngblood was signed as a free agent by the Giants.

== Regular season ==
=== Season standings ===
NL West
Team	W	L	Pct.	GB	Home	Road
Los Angeles Dodgers	91	71	.562	—	48‍–‍32	43‍–‍39
Atlanta Braves	88	74	.543	3	46‍–‍34	42‍–‍40
Houston Astros	85	77	.525	6	46‍–‍36	39‍–‍41
San Diego Padres	81	81	.500	10	47‍–‍34	34‍–‍47
San Francisco Giants	79	83	.488	12	43‍–‍38	36‍–‍45
Cincinnati Reds	74	88	.457	17	36‍–‍45	38‍–‍43

=== Record vs. opponents ===
1983 National League record Sources:
Team	ATL	CHC	CIN	HOU	LAD	MON	NYM	PHI	PIT	SD	SF	STL
Atlanta	—	5–7	12–6	11–7	7–11	7–5	8–4	7–5	6–6	9–9	9–9	7–5
Chicago	7–5	—	4–8	5–7	6–6	7–11	9–9	5–13	9–9	5–7	4–8	10–8
Cincinnati	6–12	8–4	—	5–13	7–11	4–8	7–5	6–6	6–6	9–9	10–8	6–6
Houston	7–11	7–5	13–5	—	6–12	8–4	9–3	4–8	6–6	11–7	12–6	2–10
Los Angeles	11–7	6–6	11–7	12–6	—	7–5	7–5	11–1	6–6	6–12–1	5–13	9–3
Montreal	5–7	11–7	8–4	4–8	5–7	—	8–10	8–10–1	8–10	8–4	8–4	9–9
New York	4–8	9–9	5–7	3–9	5–7	10–8	—	6–12	9–9	6–6	5–7	6–12
Philadelphia	5-7	13–5	6–6	8–4	1–11	10–8–1	12–6	—	11–7	5–7	5–7	14–4
Pittsburgh	6–6	9–9	6–6	6–6	6–6	10–8	9–9	7–11	—	9–3	6–6	10–8
San Diego	9–9	7–5	9–9	7–11	12–6–1	4–8	6–6	7–5	3–9	—	11–7	6–6
San Francisco	9–9	8–4	8–10	6–12	13–5	4–8	7–5	7–5	6–6	7–11	—	4–8
St. Louis	5–7	8–10	6–6	10–2	3–9	9–9	12–6	4–14	8–10	6–6	8–4	—

=== Opening Day starters ===
- Bob Brenly
- Jack Clark
- Chili Davis
- Darrell Evans
- Mike Krukow
- Duane Kuiper
- Johnnie LeMaster
- Jeffrey Leonard
- Tom O'Malley

=== Notable transactions ===
- May 1, 1983: Brian Kingman was signed as a free agent by the Giants.
- June 6, 1983: 1983 Major League Baseball draft
  - Charlie Hayes was drafted by the Giants in the 4th round.
  - Mike Aldrete was drafted by the Giants in the 7th round. Player signed June 22, 1983.

=== Roster ===
1983 San Francisco Giants
Roster
Pitchers: 33 Jim Barr; 48 Fred Breining; 32 Mark Calvert; 31 Mike Chris; 13 Mark Davis; 50 Scott Garrelts; 14 Atlee Hammaker; 25 Brian Kingman; 39 Mike Krukow; 25 Pat Larkin; 19 Bill Laskey; 29 Randy Lerch; 17 Renie Martin; 28 Andy McGaffigan; 38 Greg Minton	Catchers: 15 Bob Brenly; 7 Milt May; 7 Steve Nicosia; 5 John Rabb; 37 Jeff Ransom; Infielders: 16 Dave Bergman; 41 Darrell Evans; 5,32 Wallace Johnson; 18 Duane Kuiper; 10 Johnnie LeMaster; 25 Rich Murray; 35 Tom O'Malley; 2 Joe Pettini; 31,32 Chris Smith; 32 Mike Vail; 36 Brad Wellman; 8 Joel Youngblood	Outfielders: 22 Jack Clark; 30 Chili Davis; 25 Dan Gladden; 26 Jeffrey Leonard; 6 Champ Summers; 49 Max Venable; Other batters: 34 Ron Pruitt	Manager: 20 Frank Robinson; Coaches: 9 Don Buford (First Base); 12 Jim Davenport (Third Base); 36 Tommy McCraw (Hitting); 3 Danny Ozark (Third Base); 23 Herm Starrette (Pitching); 42 John VanOrnum (Bullpen)

== Player stats ==
=== Batting ===
==== Starters by position ====
Note: Pos = Position; G = Games played; AB = At bats; H = Hits; Avg. = Batting average; HR = Home runs; RBI = Runs batted in

Pos	Player	G	AB	H	Avg.	HR	RBI
C	Bob Brenly	104	281	63	.224	7	34
1B	Darrell Evans	142	523	145	.277	30	82
2B	Brad Wellman	82	182	39	.214	1	16
SS	Johnny LeMaster	141	534	128	.240	6	30
3B	Tom O'Malley	135	410	106	.259	5	45
LF	Jeffrey Leonard	139	516	144	.279	21	87
CF	Chili Davis	137	486	113	.233	11	59
RF	Jack Clark	135	492	132	.268	20	66

==== Other batters ====
Note: G = Games played; AB = At bats; H = Hits; Avg. = Batting average; HR = Home runs; RBI = Runs batted in

Player	G	AB	H	Avg.	HR	RBI
Joel Youngblood	124	373	109	.292	17	53
Max Venable	94	228	50	.219	6	27
Milt May	66	186	47	.247	6	20
Duane Kuiper	72	176	44	.250	0	14
Dave Bergman	90	140	40	.286	6	24
John Rabb	40	104	24	.231	1	14
Joe Pettini	61	86	16	.186	0	7
Chris Smith	22	67	22	.328	1	11
Dan Gladden	18	63	14	.222	1	9
Steve Nicosia	15	33	11	.333	0	6
Mike Vail	18	26	4	.154	0	3
Champ Summers	29	22	3	.136	0	3
Jeff Ransom	6	20	4	.200	1	3
Guy Sularz	10	20	2	.100	0	0
Rich Murray	4	10	2	.200	0	1
Wallace Johnson	7	8	1	.125	0	1
Ron Pruitt	1	1	0	.000	0	0

=== Pitching ===
= Indicates league leader

==== Starting pitchers ====
Note: G = Games pitched; IP = Innings pitched; W = Wins; L = Losses; ERA = Earned run average; SO = Strikeouts

Player	G	IP	W	L	ERA	SO
Fred Breining	32	202.2	11	12	3.82	117
Mike Krukow	31	184.1	11	11	3.95	136
Atlee Hammaker	23	172.1	10	9	2.25	127
Bill Laskey	25	148.1	13	10	4.19	81
Mark Davis	20	111.0	6	4	3.49	83
Scott Garrelts	5	35.2	2	2	2.52	16

==== Other pitchers ====
Note: G = Games pitched; IP = Innings pitched; W = Wins; L = Losses; ERA = Earned run average; SO = Strikeouts

Player	G	IP	W	L	ERA	SO
Andy McGaffigan	43	134.1	3	9	4.29	93
Renie Martin	37	94.1	2	4	4.20	43
Mark Calvert	18	37.1	1	4	6.27	14

==== Relief pitchers ====
Note: G = Games pitched; W = Wins; L = Losses; SV = Saves; ERA = Earned run average; SO = Strikeouts

Player	G	W	L	SV	ERA	SO
Greg Minton	73	7	11	22	3.54	38
Gary Lavelle	56	7	4	20	2.59	68
Jim Barr	53	5	3	2	3.98	47
Mike Chris	7	0	0	0	8.10	5
Randy Lerch	7	1	0	0	3.38	6
Pat Larkin	5	0	0	0	4.35	6
Brian Kingman	3	0	0	0	7.71	1

== Awards and honors ==
- 1983 Darrell Evans 1B, Willie Mac Award

All-Star Game

== Farm system ==
Level	Team	League	Manager
AAA	Phoenix Giants	Pacific Coast League	Jack Mull
AA	Shreveport Captains	Texas League	Duane Espy
A	Fresno Giants	California League	Wendell Kim
A	Clinton Giants	Midwest League	Bill Lachemann
Rookie	Great Falls Giants	Pioneer League	Terry Christman
