= 1983 St. Louis Cardinals season =

Major League Baseball season

1983 St. Louis Cardinals
- League: National League
- Division: East
- Ballpark: Busch Memorial Stadium
- City: St. Louis, Missouri
- Record: 79–83 (.488)
- Divisional place: 4th
- Owners: August "Gussie" Busch
- General managers: Joe McDonald
- Managers: Whitey Herzog
- Television: KSDK
- Radio: KMOX (Jack Buck, Mike Shannon, Dan Kelly)

The 1983 St. Louis Cardinals season was a season in American baseball. It was the Cardinals' 102nd season in St. Louis, Missouri and the 92nd season in the National League. The Cardinals went 79–83 during the season and finished fourth in the National League East, eleven games behind the NL Champion Philadelphia Phillies. They were the first team in the Divisional play era to have a losing season one year after winning the World Series.

First baseman Keith Hernandez, shortstop Ozzie Smith, and outfielder Willie McGee won Gold Gloves this year, although Hernandez was traded to the New York Mets in mid-season.

== Offseason ==
- December 2, 1982: Julio González was released by the Cardinals.
- December 14, 1982: Bobby Meacham was traded by the St. Louis Cardinals with Stan Javier to the New York Yankees for Steve Fincher (minors), Bob Helsom (minors) and Marty Mason (minors).
- February 16, 1983: Jamie Quirk was signed as a free agent by the Cardinals.

== Regular season ==
- Steve Carlton won his 300th game on September 23, 1983, against his former team, the St. Louis Cardinals.

=== Season standings ===
NL East
Team	W	L	Pct.	GB	Home	Road
Philadelphia Phillies	90	72	.556	—	50‍–‍31	40‍–‍41
Pittsburgh Pirates	84	78	.519	6	41‍–‍40	43‍–‍38
Montreal Expos	82	80	.506	8	46‍–‍35	36‍–‍45
St. Louis Cardinals	79	83	.488	11	44‍–‍37	35‍–‍46
Chicago Cubs	71	91	.438	19	43‍–‍38	28‍–‍53
New York Mets	68	94	.420	22	41‍–‍41	27‍–‍53

=== Record vs. opponents ===
1983 National League record Sources:
Team	ATL	CHC	CIN	HOU	LAD	MON	NYM	PHI	PIT	SD	SF	STL
Atlanta	—	5–7	12–6	11–7	7–11	7–5	8–4	7–5	6–6	9–9	9–9	7–5
Chicago	7–5	—	4–8	5–7	6–6	7–11	9–9	5–13	9–9	5–7	4–8	10–8
Cincinnati	6–12	8–4	—	5–13	7–11	4–8	7–5	6–6	6–6	9–9	10–8	6–6
Houston	7–11	7–5	13–5	—	6–12	8–4	9–3	4–8	6–6	11–7	12–6	2–10
Los Angeles	11–7	6–6	11–7	12–6	—	7–5	7–5	11–1	6–6	6–12–1	5–13	9–3
Montreal	5–7	11–7	8–4	4–8	5–7	—	8–10	8–10–1	8–10	8–4	8–4	9–9
New York	4–8	9–9	5–7	3–9	5–7	10–8	—	6–12	9–9	6–6	5–7	6–12
Philadelphia	5–7	13–5	6–6	8–4	1–11	10–8–1	12–6	—	11–7	5–7	5–7	14–4
Pittsburgh	6–6	9–9	6–6	6–6	6–6	10–8	9–9	7–11	—	9–3	6–6	10–8
San Diego	9–9	7–5	9–9	7–11	12–6–1	4–8	6–6	7–5	3–9	—	11–7	6–6
San Francisco	9–9	8–4	8–10	6–12	13–5	4–8	7–5	7–5	6–6	7–11	—	4–8
St. Louis	5–7	8–10	6–6	10–2	3–9	9–9	12–6	4–14	8–10	6–6	8–4	—

=== Opening Day Lineup ===
Opening Day Starters
#	Name	Position
27	Lonnie Smith	LF
1	Ozzie Smith	SS
37	Keith Hernandez	1B
25	George Hendrick	RF
22	David Green	CF
15	Darrell Porter	C
10	Ken Oberkfell	3B
5	Mike Ramsey	2B
31	Bob Forsch	P

=== Notable transactions ===
- June 15, 1983: Keith Hernandez was traded by the Cardinals to the New York Mets for Neil Allen and Rick Ownbey.
- July 6, 1983: Jim Kaat was released by the Cardinals.
- August 2, 1983: Eric Rasmussen was purchased from the Cardinals by the Kansas City Royals.

==== Draft picks ====
- June 6, 1983: 1983 Major League Baseball draft
  - Jim Lindeman was drafted by the Cardinals in the 1st round (24th pick).
  - Tom Pagnozzi was drafted by the Cardinals in the 8th round. Player signed June 18, 1983.

=== Roster ===
1983 St. Louis Cardinals
Roster
Pitchers: 13 Neil Allen; 47 Joaquín Andújar; 40 Doug Bair; 41 Steve Baker; 43 Ralph Citarella; 34 Danny Cox; 31 Bob Forsch; 34 Kevin Hagen; 36 Jim Kaat; 44 Jeff Keener; 32 Jeff Lahti; 39 Dave LaPoint; 33 John Martin; 34 Eric Rasmussen; 36 Dave Rucker; 48 John Stuper; 42 Bruce Sutter; 38 Dave Von Ohlen	Catchers: 11 Glenn Brummer; 15 Darrell Porter; 16 Jamie Quirk; 23 Orlando Sánchez; Infielders: 14 Jim Adduci; 7 Jeff Doyle; 25 George Hendrick; 37 Keith Hernandez; 28 Tom Herr; 30 Bill Lyons; 10 Ken Oberkfell; 5 Mike Ramsey; 12 Floyd Rayford; 14 Rafael Santana; 21 Jimmy Sexton; 1 Ozzie Smith	Outfielders: 26 Steve Braun; 22 David Green; 19 Dane Iorg; 21 Tito Landrum; 51 Willie McGee; 29 Gene Roof; 27 Lonnie Smith; 18 Andy Van Slyke	Manager: 24 Whitey Herzog; Coaches: 4 Chuck Hiller; 9 Hub Kittle; 8 Hal Lanier; 3 Dave Ricketts; 2 Red Schoendienst

== Player stats ==
=== Batting ===
==== Starters by position ====
Note: Pos = Position; G = Games played; AB = At bats; H = Hits; Avg. = Batting average; HR = Home runs; RBI = Runs batted in

Pos	Player	G	AB	H	Avg.	HR	RBI
C	Darrell Porter	145	443	116	.262	15	66
1B	George Hendrick	144	529	168	.318	18	97
2B	Tommy Herr	89	313	101	.323	2	31
SS	Ozzie Smith	159	552	134	.243	3	50
3B	Ken Oberkfell	151	488	143	.293	3	38
LF	Lonnie Smith	130	492	158	.321	8	45
CF	Willie McGee	147	601	172	.286	5	75
RF	David Green	146	422	120	.284	8	69

==== Other batters ====
Note: G = Games played; AB = At bats; H = Hits; Avg. = Batting average; HR = Home runs; RBI = Runs batted in

Player	G	AB	H	Avg.	HR	RBI
Andy Van Slyke	101	309	81	.262	8	38
Keith Hernandez	55	218	62	.284	3	26
Mike Ramsey	97	175	46	.263	1	16
Dane Iorg	58	116	31	.267	0	11
Floyd Rayford	56	104	22	.212	3	14
Steve Braun	78	92	25	.272	3	7
Glenn Brummer	45	87	24	.276	0	9
Jamie Quirk	48	86	18	.209	2	11
Bill Lyons	42	60	10	.167	0	3
Jeff Doyle	13	37	11	.297	0	2
Jim Adduci	10	20	1	.050	0	0
Rafael Santana	30	14	3	.214	0	2
Jimmy Sexton	6	9	1	.111	0	0
Orlando Sánchez	6	6	0	.000	0	0
Tito Landrum	6	5	1	.200	0	0
Gene Roof	6	3	0	.000	0	0

=== Pitching ===
==== Starting pitchers ====
Note: G = Games pitched; IP = Innings pitched; W = Wins; L = Losses; ERA = Earned run average; SO = Strikeouts

Player	G	IP	W	L	ERA	SO
Joaquín Andújar	39	225.0	6	16	4.16	125
John Stuper	40	198.0	12	11	3.68	81
Dave LaPoint	37	191.1	12	9	3.95	113
Bob Forsch	34	187.0	10	12	4.28	56
Neil Allen	25	121.2	10	6	3.70	74
Danny Cox	12	83.0	3	6	3.25	36

==== Other pitchers ====
Note: G = Games pitched; IP = Innings pitched; W = Wins; L = Losses; ERA = Earned run average; SO = Strikeouts

Player	G	IP	W	L	ERA	SO
John Martin	26	66.1	3	1	3.53	29
Kevin Hagen	9	22.1	2	2	4.84	7

==== Relief pitchers ====
Note: G = Games pitched; W = Wins; L = Losses; SV = Saves; ERA = Earned run average; SO = Strikeouts

Player	G	W	L	SV	ERA	SO
Bruce Sutter	60	9	10	21	4.23	64
Jeff Lahti	53	3	3	0	3.16	26
Dave Von Ohlen	46	3	2	2	3.29	21
Dave Rucker	34	5	3	0	2.43	22
Doug Bair	26	1	1	1	3.03	21
Jim Kaat	24	0	0	0	3.89	19
Steve Baker	8	0	1	0	1.80	1
Ralph Citarella	6	0	0	0	1.64	4
Eric Rasmussen	6	0	0	1	11.74	6
Jeff Keener	4	0	0	0	8.31	4

== Farm system ==
Level	Team	League	Manager
AAA	Louisville Redbirds	American Association	Jim Fregosi
AA	Arkansas Travelers	Texas League	Nick Leyva
A	St. Petersburg Cardinals	Florida State League	Jim Riggleman
A	Springfield Cardinals	Midwest League	Dave Bialas
A	Macon Redbirds	South Atlantic League	Lloyd Merritt
A-Short Season	Erie Cardinals	New York–Penn League	Joe Rigoli
Rookie	Johnson City Cardinals	Appalachian League	Rich Hacker
