= 1983 Pittsburgh Pirates season =

1983 Pittsburgh Pirates
- League: National League
- Division: East
- Ballpark: Three Rivers Stadium
- City: Pittsburgh, Pennsylvania
- Record: 84–78 (.519)
- Divisional place: 2nd
- Owners: John W. Galbreath; Warner Communications
- General managers: Harding "Pete" Peterson
- Managers: Chuck Tanner
- Television: KDKA-TV (Lanny Frattare, Jim Rooker, John Sanders); HSE (Steve Blass, Bob Prince, Willie Stargell)
- Radio: KDKA-AM (Lanny Frattare, Jim Rooker)

The 1983 Pittsburgh Pirates season was the 102nd season of the Pittsburgh Pirates franchise; their 97th in the National League. This was their 14th season at Three Rivers Stadium. The Pirates finished second in the National League East with a record of 84–78.

== Regular season ==
=== Season standings ===
NL East
Team	W	L	Pct.	GB	Home	Road
Philadelphia Phillies	90	72	.556	—	50‍–‍31	40‍–‍41
Pittsburgh Pirates	84	78	.519	6	41‍–‍40	43‍–‍38
Montreal Expos	82	80	.506	8	46‍–‍35	36‍–‍45
St. Louis Cardinals	79	83	.488	11	44‍–‍37	35‍–‍46
Chicago Cubs	71	91	.438	19	43‍–‍38	28‍–‍53
New York Mets	68	94	.420	22	41‍–‍41	27‍–‍53

=== Record vs. opponents ===
1983 National League record Sources:
Team	ATL	CHC	CIN	HOU	LAD	MON	NYM	PHI	PIT	SD	SF	STL
Atlanta	—	5–7	12–6	11–7	7–11	7–5	8–4	7–5	6–6	9–9	9–9	7–5
Chicago	7–5	—	4–8	5–7	6–6	7–11	9–9	5–13	9–9	5–7	4–8	10–8
Cincinnati	6–12	8–4	—	5–13	7–11	4–8	7–5	6–6	6–6	9–9	10–8	6–6
Houston	7–11	7–5	13–5	—	6–12	8–4	9–3	4–8	6–6	11–7	12–6	2–10
Los Angeles	11–7	6–6	11–7	12–6	—	7–5	7–5	11–1	6–6	6–12–1	5–13	9–3
Montreal	5–7	11–7	8–4	4–8	5–7	—	8–10	8–10–1	8–10	8–4	8–4	9–9
New York	4–8	9–9	5–7	3–9	5–7	10–8	—	6–12	9–9	6–6	5–7	6–12
Philadelphia	5-7	13–5	6–6	8–4	1–11	10–8–1	12–6	—	11–7	5–7	5–7	14–4
Pittsburgh	6–6	9–9	6–6	6–6	6–6	10–8	9–9	7–11	—	9–3	6–6	10–8
San Diego	9–9	7–5	9–9	7–11	12–6–1	4–8	6–6	7–5	3–9	—	11–7	6–6
San Francisco	9–9	8–4	8–10	6–12	13–5	4–8	7–5	7–5	6–6	7–11	—	4–8
St. Louis	5–7	8–10	6–6	10–2	3–9	9–9	12–6	4–14	8–10	6–6	8–4	—

=== Game log ===
1983 Game Log: 84–78 (Home: 41–40; Away: 43–38)
April: 8–9 (Home: 3–7; Away: 5–2)

#	Date	Opponent	Score	Win	Loss	Save	Attendance	Record
1	April 5	@ Cardinals	7–1	**Candelaria** (1–0)	Forsch	—	43,509	1–0
2	April 7	@ Astros	3–2	**Scurry** (1–0)	Knepper	—	7,741	2–0
3	April 8	@ Astros	5–3	**Scurry** (2–0)	DiPino	**Bibby** (1)	10,862	3–0
4	April 9	@ Astros	1–0	**McWilliams** (1–0)	Niekro	—	13,856	4–0
5	April 10	@ Astros	10–8	**Bibby** (1–0)	Solano	**Scurry** (1)	7,668	5–0
6	April 12	Cardinals	3–4 (10)	Sutter	**Bibby** (1–1)	Rasmussen	46,869	5–1
7	April 13	Cardinals	1–9	Andujar	**Tunnell** (0–1)	—	4,126	5–2
8	April 16	Cubs	5–6	Hernandez	**McWilliams** (1–1)	Smith	5,494	5–3
9	April 17	Cubs	7–0	**Candelaria** (2–0)	Trout	**Rhoden** (1)	14,285	6–3
10	April 20	@ Mets	0–6	Seaver	**McWilliams** (1–2)	—		6–4
11	April 20	@ Mets	5–7	Diaz	**Tekulve** (0–1)	Allen	4,041	6–5
12	April 22	Dodgers	2–4	Reuss	**Rhoden** (0–1)	Pena	8,846	6–6
13	April 23	Dodgers	2–3	Welch	**Candelaria** (2–1)	Howe	8,187	6–7
14	April 26	Giants	3–0	**McWilliams** (2–2)	Breining	—	7,103	7–7
15	April 27	Giants	2–3	Laskey	**Rhoden** (0–2)	Minton	5,267	7–8
16	April 30	Padres	4–8	Hawkins	**Candelaria** (2–2)	—		7–9
17	April 30	Padres	2–1	**McWilliams** (3–2)	DeLeon	**Scurry** (2)	19,593	8–9

May: 10–15 (Home: 5–5; Away: 5–10)

#	Date	Opponent	Score	Win	Loss	Save	Attendance	Record
18	May 2	@ Dodgers	5–1	**Rhoden** (1–2)	Reuss	—	39,765	9–9
19	May 3	@ Dodgers	4–5	Pena	**Bibby** (1–2)	Howe	34,624	9–10
20	May 4	@ Dodgers	2–3	Niedenfuer	**Sarmiento** (0–1)	—	35,757	9–11
21	May 6	@ Giants	1–2	McGaffigan	**Candelaria** (2–3)	Lavelle	16,476	9–12
22	May 7	@ Giants	1–5	Breining	**Rhoden** (1–3)	—	10,874	9–13
23	May 8	@ Giants	1–12	Laskey	**Bibby** (1–3)	—	19,123	9–14
24	May 9	@ Padres	5–3 (14)	**Sarmiento** (1–1)	Couchee	—	17,885	10–14
25	May 10	@ Padres	1–4	Hawkins	**Scurry** (2–1)	—	9,965	10–15
26	May 12	Mets	6–2	**Candelaria** (3–3)	Torrez	—	7,944	11–15
27	May 13	Mets	2–1	**Tekulve** (1–1)	Diaz	—	11,000	12–15
28	May 14	Mets	2–6	Allen	**McWilliams** (3–3)	Orosco	8,931	12–16
29	May 16	Mets	4–11	Lynch	**Bibby** (1–4)	Swan	1,970	12–17
30	May 17	Reds	1–2	Soto	**Candelaria** (3–4)	—	5,207	12–18
31	May 18	Reds	2–1	**Rhoden** (2–3)	Berenyi	—	6,402	13–18
32	May 20	Astros	4–3	**McWilliams** (4–3)	Knepper	**Tekulve** (1)	13,643	14–18
33	May 21	Astros	4–6	LaCoss	**Niemann** (0–1)	DiPino	8,804	14–19
34	May 23	@ Braves	3–6	Falcone	**Rhoden** (2–4)	Moore	16,743	14–20
35	May 24	@ Braves	6–5	**McWilliams** (5–3)	Camp	—	17,447	15–20
36	May 25	@ Braves	0–6	McMurtry	**Bibby** (1–5)	—	15,034	15–21
37	May 26	@ Reds	6–4	**Tunnell** (1–1)	Puleo	**Tekulve** (2)	10,018	16–21
38	May 27	@ Reds	0–9	Soto	**Candelaria** (3–5)	—	13,224	16–22
39	May 28	@ Reds	3–4	Hayes	**Scurry** (2–2)	Scherrer	23,994	16–23
40	May 29	@ Reds	8–5	**McWilliams** (6–3)	Scherrer	**Sarmiento** (1)	13,394	17–23
41	May 30	Braves	8–6	**Bibby** (2–5)	McMurtry	**Tekulve** (3)	12,211	18–23
42	May 31	Braves	2–10	Niekro	**Tunnell** (1–2)	Bedrosian	5,262	18–24

June: 14–15 (Home: 7–5; Away: 7–10)

#	Date	Opponent	Score	Win	Loss	Save	Attendance	Record
43	June 1	Braves	3–6	Perez	**Candelaria** (3–6)	Garber	6,255	18–25
44	June 2	@ Cubs	2–3	Trout	**Rhoden** (2–5)	Smith	6,589	18–26
45	June 3	@ Cubs	3–9	Ruthven	**Scurry** (2–3)	—	6,213	18–27
46	June 4	@ Cubs	2–5	Jenkins	**Bibby** (2–6)	Campbell	30,110	18–28
47	June 5	@ Cubs	1–3	Lefferts	**Tunnell** (1–3)	Smith	22,649	18–29
48	June 7	@ Expos	3–2	**Candelaria** (4–6)	Lea	**Tekulve** (4)	31,730	19–29
49	June 8	@ Expos	4–5	Gullickson	**Rhoden** (2–6)	Reardon	16,200	19–30
50	June 9	@ Expos	6–3	**McWilliams** (7–3)	Rogers	—	34,313	20–30
51	June 10	@ Phillies	4–3 (12)	**Tekulve** (2–1)	Farmer	—	31,092	21–30
52	June 11	@ Phillies	7–9	Carlton	**Scurry** (2–4)	Holland	34,820	21–31
53	June 12	@ Phillies	4–5 (11)	Reed	**Scurry** (2–5)	—	37,154	21–32
54	June 13	Expos	4–3	**Rhoden** (3–6)	Gullickson	**Tekulve** (5)	8,229	22–32
55	June 14	Expos	3–7	Rogers	**McWilliams** (7–4)	Reardon	9,588	22–33
56	June 15	Expos	4–7	Burris	**Bibby** (2–7)	Reardon	11,809	22–34
57	June 17	Phillies	2–1	**Candelaria** (5–6)	Denny	**Tekulve** (6)	19,814	23–34
58	June 18	Phillies	4–6	Bystrom	**Rhoden** (3–7)	—	26,662	23–35
59	June 19	Phillies	2–14	Hudson	**McWilliams** (7–5)	—	19,369	23–36
60	June 20	Cubs	5–4 (10)	**Tekulve** (3–1)	Campbell	—		24–36
61	June 20	Cubs	6–5 (13)	**Robinson** (1–0)	Campbell	—	5,839	25–36
62	June 21	Cubs	8–4	**Rhoden** (4–7)	Noles	—	6,363	26–36
63	June 22	Cubs	5–2	**Candelaria** (6–6)	Rainey	**Guante** (1)	8,666	27–36
64	June 23	Cubs	5–2	**McWilliams** (8–5)	Trout	—	8,296	28–36
65	June 24	@ Cardinals	8–2	**Bibby** (3–7)	LaPoint	**Sarmiento** (2)	39,475	29–36
66	June 25	@ Cardinals	10–3	**Tunnell** (2–3)	Hagen	—	29,567	30–36
67	June 26	@ Cardinals	5–0	**Rhoden** (5–7)	Allen	—	32,306	31–36
68	June 27	@ Cardinals	6–1	**Guante** (1–0)	Andujar	—	23,286	32–36
69	June 28	@ Cubs	7–8 (11)	Lefferts	**Tekulve** (3–2)	—	11,832	32–37
70	June 29	@ Cubs	0–5	Ruthven	**Bibby** (3–8)	—	28,504	32–38
71	June 30	@ Cubs	3–4	Smith	**Sarmiento** (1–2)	—	17,261	32–39

July: 22–10 (Home: 10–7; Away: 12–3)

#	Date	Opponent	Score	Win	Loss	Save	Attendance	Record
72	July 1	Cardinals	6–13	Andujar	**Robinson** (1–1)	—	26,019	32–40
73	July 2	Cardinals	3–1	**Candelaria** (7–6)	LaPoint	—	27,446	33–40
74	July 3	Cardinals	3–4	Forsch	**Sarmiento** (1–3)	Sutter	14,469	33–41
75	July 4	Cardinals	7–2	**Rhoden** (6–7)	Hagen	—		34–41
76	July 4	Cardinals	4–11	Allen	**Bibby** (3–9)	—	22,185	34–42
77	July 8	@ Dodgers	4–3	**Candelaria** (8–6)	Reuss	**Tekulve** (7)	41,397	35–42
78	July 9	@ Dodgers	3–0	**McWilliams** (9–5)	Pena	—	46,046	36–42
79	July 10	@ Dodgers	3–10	Hooton	**Rhoden** (6–8)	Howe	42,480	36–43
80	July 11	@ Giants	3–2	**Sarmiento** (2–3)	Breining	**Scurry** (3)	18,429	37–43
81	July 12	@ Giants	6–2	**Tunnell** (3–3)	Laskey	**Guante** (2)	7,789	38–43
82	July 13	@ Giants	7–6	**Sarmiento** (3–3)	Minton	**Tekulve** (8)	14,316	39–43
83	July 14	@ Padres	8–6	**Guante** (2–0)	Montefusco	**Bibby** (2)	17,001	40–43
84	July 15	@ Padres	4–2	**Tekulve** (4–2)	Thurmond	—	15,601	41–43
85	July 16	@ Padres	3–2	**Robinson** (2–1)	Whitson	**Tekulve** (9)	26,414	42–43
86	July 17	@ Padres	4–3	**Tunnell** (4–3)	Show	**Tekulve** (10)	17,897	43–43
87	July 19	Dodgers	4–1	**Candelaria** (9–6)	Reuss	**Scurry** (4)		44–43
88	July 19	Dodgers	2–3 (11)	Howe	**Sarmiento** (3–4)	Niedenfuer	31,304	44–44
89	July 20	Dodgers	7–3	**Rhoden** (7–8)	Hooton	—	16,561	45–44
90	July 21	Dodgers	5–4	**Tekulve** (5–2)	Howe	—	16,351	46–44
91	July 22	Giants	3–5	Barr	**Scurry** (2–6)	Minton	23,834	46–45
92	July 23	Giants	5–2	**DeLeon** (1–0)	Martin	**Scurry** (5)	14,585	47–45
93	July 24	Giants	3–1	**Scurry** (3–6)	Krukow	**Tekulve** (11)		48–45
94	July 24	Giants	5–8 (11)	Minton	**Scurry** (3–7)	McGaffigan	39,660	48–46
95	July 25	Padres	6–3	**Rhoden** (8–8)	Dravecky	**Guante** (3)	12,161	49–46
96	July 26	Padres	1–6	Thurmond	**Robinson** (2–2)	DeLeon		49–47
97	July 26	Padres	10–5	**Tunnell** (5–3)	Whitson	—	20,660	50–47
98	July 27	Padres	10–1	**DeLeon** (2–0)	Show	—	18,793	51–47
99	July 28	@ Mets	6–2	**McWilliams** (10–5)	Swan	**Scurry** (6)	12,233	52–47
100	July 29	@ Mets	2–1	**Candelaria** (10–6)	Seaver	**Guante** (4)	14,306	53–47
101	July 30	@ Mets	6–3	**Scurry** (4–7)	Lynch	**Sarmiento** (3)	17,721	54–47
102	July 31	@ Mets	6–7 (12)	Orosco	**Bibby** (3–10)	—		54–48
103	July 31	@ Mets	0–1 (12)	Orosco	**Sarmiento** (3–5)	—	17,591	54–49

August: 14–14 (Home: 8–11; Away: 6–3)

#	Date	Opponent	Score	Win	Loss	Save	Attendance	Record
104	August 2	Phillies	10–3	**McWilliams** (11–5)	Gross	—	25,130	55–49
105	August 3	Phillies	7–2	**Candelaria** (11–6)	Bystrom	**Tekulve** (12)	23,070	56–49
106	August 4	Phillies	1–5	Hudson	**Rhoden** (8–9)	Holland	20,574	56–50
107	August 5	Expos	1–7	Gullickson	**DeLeon** (2–1)	—	33,089	56–51
108	August 6	Expos	3–7	Smith	**Tunnell** (5–4)	—	24,561	56–52
109	August 7	Expos	0–6	Rogers	**McWilliams** (11–6)	—	29,187	56–53
110	August 8	@ Phillies	5–14	Hudson	**Candelaria** (11–7)	—	38,080	56–54
111	August 9	@ Phillies	3–1	**Tekulve** (6–2)	Holland	—	37,719	57–54
112	August 10	@ Phillies	2–4	Carlton	**DeLeon** (2–2)	Holland	38,705	57–55
113	August 12	@ Expos	6–3	**McWilliams** (12–6)	Rogers	**Guante** (5)	45,862	58–55
114	August 13	@ Expos	2–0	**Candelaria** (12–7)	Smith	**Tekulve** (13)	38,658	59–55
115	August 14	@ Expos	5–3	**Rhoden** (9–9)	Schatzeder	**Tekulve** (14)	50,062	60–55
116	August 15	Mets	4–2	**DeLeon** (3–2)	Torrez	**Tekulve** (15)	15,053	61–55
117	August 16	Mets	3–1	**Tunnell** (6–4)	Swan	**Guante** (6)	12,061	62–55
118	August 18	Reds	5–6	Hume	**Tekulve** (6–3)	Hayes	18,007	62–56
119	August 19	Reds	1–2	Soto	**Rhoden** (9–10)	—	15,995	62–57
120	August 20	Reds	4–0	**DeLeon** (4–2)	Berenyi	—	44,481	63–57
121	August 21	Reds	4–6	Scherrer	**Guante** (2–1)	—	24,635	63–58
122	August 23	Astros	5–6	Ruhle	**Tekulve** (6–4)	DiPino		63–59
123	August 23	Astros	1–2	Niekro	**Tunnell** (6–5)	Dawley	17,484	63–60
124	August 24	Astros	4–10	Madden	**Rhoden** (9–11)	LaCoss	14,279	63–61
125	August 25	Astros	5–3	**DeLeon** (5–2)	Knepper	**Scurry** (7)	11,019	64–61
126	August 26	Braves	9–1	**McWilliams** (13–6)	Perez	—	23,772	65–61
127	August 27	Braves	2–0	**Tunnell** (7–5)	Dayley	—	22,811	66–61
128	August 28	Braves	1–2	Falcone	**Candelaria** (12–8)	Forster	26,193	66–62
129	August 29	@ Reds	2–1	**Rhoden** (10–11)	Soto	**Tekulve** (16)	11,173	67–62
130	August 30	@ Reds	5–3	**DeLeon** (6–2)	Russell	**Tekulve** (17)	10,160	68–62
131	August 31	@ Astros	1–4	Niekro	**Scurry** (4–8)	—	12,347	68–63

September: 15–14 (Home: 8–5; Away: 7–9)

#	Date	Opponent	Score	Win	Loss	Save	Attendance	Record
132	September 1	@ Astros	0–3	Ryan	**Guante** (2–2)	DiPino	7,645	68–64
133	September 2	@ Braves	4–1	**Candelaria** (13–8)	Dayley	**Tekulve** (18)	23,998	69–64
134	September 3	@ Braves	6–2	**Bibby** (4–10)	Bedrosian	**Guante** (7)	31,233	70–64
135	September 4	@ Braves	5–6	Forster	**Bibby** (4–11)	Bedrosian	24,610	70–65
136	September 5	@ Cardinals	4–7	LaPoint	**Scurry** (4–9)	—		70–66
137	September 5	@ Cardinals	6–7 (10)	Allen	**Guante** (2–3)	—	39,687	70–67
138	September 6	@ Cardinals	5–0	**Tunnell** (8–5)	Stuper	—	23,604	71–67
139	September 7	@ Cardinals	2–5	Cox	**Rhoden** (10–12)	Sutter	25,981	71–68
140	September 9	Phillies	3–4 (13)	Hernandez	**Bibby** (4–12)	—	24,304	71–69
141	September 10	Phillies	6–5 (10)	**Tekulve** (7–4)	Holland	—	26,246	72–69
142	September 11	Phillies	3–5	Reed	**Guante** (2–4)	—	19,130	72–70
143	September 12	Cardinals	7–5	**Tunnell** (9–5)	Cox	**Sarmiento** (4)	10,458	73–70
144	September 13	Cardinals	6–0	**Rhoden** (11–12)	Andujar	—	9,771	74–70
145	September 14	Cubs	6–3	**Candelaria** (14–8)	Trout	—	16,329	75–70
146	September 15	Cubs	8–4	**McWilliams** (14–6)	Rainey	—	7,943	76–70
147	September 16	Expos	9–0	**DeLeon** (7–2)	Lea	—	13,057	77–70
148	September 17	Expos	5–4 (13)	**Bibby** (5–12)	Dixon	—	29,748	78–70
149	September 18	Expos	2–5	Sanderson	**Rhoden** (11–13)	James	25,738	78–71
150	September 19	@ Mets	4–5 (10)	Diaz	**Tekulve** (7–5)	—	6,381	78–72
151	September 20	@ Mets	4–0	**McWilliams** (15–6)	Lynch	—	3,112	79–72
152	September 21	@ Cubs	6–7	Jenkins	**Guante** (2–5)	Smith	3,029	79–73
153	September 22	@ Cubs	8–2	**Tunnell** (10–5)	Reuschel	—	3,426	80–73
154	September 23	@ Expos	10–1	**Rhoden** (12–13)	Sanderson	—	37,115	81–73
155	September 24	@ Expos	1–0	**Candelaria** (15–8)	Smith	**Guante** (8)	43,359	82–73
156	September 25	@ Expos	3–5	Gullickson	**McWilliams** (15–7)	Reardon	37,602	82–74
157	September 27	Mets	3–4	Torrez	**DeLeon** (7–3)	Sisk	10,913	82–75
158	September 28	Mets	2–4	Darling	**Tunnell** (10–6)	—	8,672	82–76
159	September 29	Mets	4–2	**Rhoden** (13–13)	Holman	**Guante** (9)	7,677	83–76
160	September 30	@ Phillies	1–2	Denny	**McWilliams** (15–8)	Holland	26,685	83–77

October: 1–1 (Home: 0–0; Away: 1–1)

#	Date	Opponent	Score	Win	Loss	Save	Attendance	Record
161	October 1	@ Phillies	3–5	Altamirano	**Guante** (2–6)	Carman	34,763	83–78
162	October 2	@ Phillies	4–0	**Tunnell** (11–6)	Hudson	—	33,284	84–78

Legend: = Win = Loss
Bold = Pirates team member

== Roster ==
1983 Pittsburgh Pirates
Roster
Pitchers: 26 Jim Bibby; 45 John Candelaria; 25 José DeLeón; 47 Cecilio Guante; 49 Larry McWilliams; 46 Randy Niemann; 28 Bob Owchinko; 58 Alfonso Pulido; 29 Rick Rhoden; 43 Don Robinson; 38 Manny Sarmiento; 19 Rod Scurry; 27 Kent Tekulve; 34 Dave Tomlin; 22 Lee Tunnell; 41,59 Jim Winn	Catchers: 14 Milt May; 16 Steve Nicosia; 36 Junior Ortiz; 6 Tony Peña; Infielders: 37 Rafael Belliard; 4 Dale Berra; 10 Richie Hebner; 5 Bill Madlock; 2 Jim Morrison; 3 Johnny Ray; 18 Gene Tenace; 30 Jason Thompson; 15 Ron Wotus	Outfielders: 46 Miguel Diloné; 24 Mike Easler; 51 Doug Frobel; 12 Brian Harper; 17 Lee Lacy; 11 Lee Mazzilli; 16 Joe Orsulak; 39 Dave Parker; 36 Marvell Wynne	Manager: 7 Chuck Tanner; Coaches: 31 Harvey Haddix (pitching); 23 Grant Jackson (bullpen); 32 Joe Lonnett (third base); 42 Alex Monchak (first base); 48 Bob Skinner (hitting)

=== Opening Day lineup ===
Opening Day Starters
#	Name	Position
17	Lee Lacy	LF
11	Lee Mazzilli	CF
5	Bill Madlock	3B
30	Jason Thompson	1B
39	Dave Parker	RF
3	Johnny Ray	2B
6	Tony Peña	C
4	Dale Berra	SS
45	John Candelaria	SP

== Player stats ==
= Indicates team leader

= Indicates league leader

Batting

Note: G = Games played; AB = At bats; H = Hits; Avg. = Batting average; HR = Home runs; RBI = Runs batted in

Regular season
Player	G	AB	H	Avg.	HR	RBI
B. Madlock	130	473	153	0.323	12	68
M. Easler	115	381	117	0.307	10	54
J. Morrison	66	158	48	0.304	6	25
L. Lacy	108	288	87	0.302	4	13
T. Peña	151	542	163	0.301	15	70
D. Frobel	32	60	17	0.283	3	11
J. Ray	151	576	163	0.283	5	53
D. Parker	144	552	154	0.279	12	69
R. Hebner	78	162	43	0.265	5	26
J. Thompson	152	517	134	0.259	18	76
D. Berra	161	537	135	0.251	10	52
M. May	7	12	3	0.250	0	0
M. Wynne	103	366	89	0.243	7	26
L. Mazzilli	109	246	59	0.240	5	24
B. Harper	61	131	29	0.221	7	20
J. Orsulak	7	11	2	0.182	0	1
G. Tenace	53	62	11	0.177	0	6
D. Robinson	10	13	2	0.154	1	3
R. Rhoden	36	86	13	0.151	0	5
J. Candelaria	33	65	9	0.138	0	2
S. Nicosia	21	46	6	0.130	1	1
J. Ortiz	5	8	1	0.125	0	0
L. Tunnell	35	58	7	0.121	0	3
L. McWilliams	35	79	9	0.114	0	4
J. Bibby	29	18	2	0.111	0	0
C. Guante	49	22	2	0.091	0	0
J. DeLeón	15	34	2	0.059	0	0
R. Belliard	4	1	0	0.000	0	0
R. Niemann	8	1	0	0.000	0	0
M. Sarmiento	52	10	0	0.000	0	0
R. Scurry	61	5	0	0.000	0	0
K. Tekulve	76	8	0	0.000	0	0
R. Wotus	5	3	0	0.000	0	0
M. Diloné	7	0	0	—	0	0
B. Owchinko	1	0	0	—	0	0
A. Pulido	1	0	0	—	0	0
D. Tomlin	5	0	0	—	0	0
J. Winn	7	0	0	—	0	0
Team totals	162	5,531	1,460	0.264	121	612

Pitching

Note: G = Games pitched; IP = Innings pitched; W = Wins; L = Losses; ERA = Earned run average; SO = Strikeouts

Regular season
Player	G	IP	W	L	ERA	SO
B. Owchinko	1	0	0	0	inf	0
K. Tekulve	76	99	7	5	1.64	52
J. DeLeón	15	108	7	3	2.83	118
M. Sarmiento	52	84 1/3	3	5	2.99	49
R. Rhoden	36	244 1/3	13	13	3.09	153
J. Candelaria	33	197 2/3	15	8	3.23	157
L. McWilliams	35	238	15	8	3.25	199
C. Guante	49	100 1/3	2	6	3.32	82
L. Tunnell	35	177 2/3	11	6	3.65	95
D. Robinson	9	36 1/3	2	2	4.46	28
R. Scurry	61	68	4	9	5.56	67
J. Bibby	29	78	5	12	6.69	44
D. Tomlin	5	4	0	0	6.75	5
J. Winn	7	11	0	0	7.36	3
A. Pulido	1	2	0	0	9.00	1
R. Niemann	8	13 2/3	0	1	9.22	8
Team totals	162	1462 1/3	84	78	3.55	1,061

== Awards and honors ==
1983 Major League Baseball All-Star Game

- Bill Madlock, 3B, reserve

== Transactions ==
- October 4, 1982 – Released Grant Jackson.
- October 4, 1982 – Released Paul Moskau.
- October 20, 1982 – Bob Long granted free agency.
- November 10, 1982 – Omar Moreno granted free agency.
- December 1, 1982 – Signed Gene Tenace as a free agent.
- December 3, 1982 – Signed Jose Lind as an amateur free agent.
- December 6, 1982 – Odell Jones drafted by the Texas Rangers in the 1982 rule 5 draft.
- December 22, 1982 – Traded Jerry Aubin (minors), Bubba Holland (minors), Jose Rivera (minors) and Tim Burke to the New York Yankees. Received Lee Mazzilli.
- January, 1982 – Signed Randy Jones as a free agent.
- January, 1982 – Jim Smith sent to the Chicago White Sox in an unknown transaction.
- January 11, 1983 – Drafted Rich Sauveur in the 11th round of the 1983 amateur draft (January), but did not sign the player.
- January 11, 1983 – Drafted Tim Drummond in the 12th round of the 1983 amateur draft (January).
- January 28, 1983 – Signed Nino Espinosa as a free agent.
- March 8, 1983 – Signed Tom Hausman as a free agent.
- March 27, 1983 – Released Randy Jones.
- March 28, 1983 – Released Ross Baumgarten.
- March 28, 1983 – Released Dick Davis.
- March 28, 1983 – Released John Milner.
- May 2, 1983 – Signed Bob Owchinko as a free agent.
- June 6, 1983 – Drafted Stan Fansler in the 2nd round of the 1983 amateur draft.
- June 6, 1983 – Drafted Rich Sauveur in the 5th round of the 1983 amateur draft (June Secondary). Player signed June 8, 1983.
- June 6, 1983 – Drafted John Smiley in the 12th round of the 1983 amateur draft. Player signed June 10, 1983.
- June 6, 1983 – Drafted Steve Carter in the 21st round of the 1983 amateur draft, but did not sign the player.
- June 8, 1983 – Traded Steve Farr to the Cleveland Indians. Received John Malkin (minors).
- June 11, 1983 – Signed Félix Fermín as an amateur free agent.
- June 14, 1983 – Traded Arthur Ray (minors) and Junior Ortiz to the New York Mets. Received Steve Senteney and Marvell Wynne.
- August 2, 1983 – Purchased Dave Tomlin from the Montreal Expos.
- August 19, 1983 – Traded Steve Nicosia to the San Francisco Giants. Received Milt May and cash.
- August 29, 1983 – Signed Jose Melendez as an amateur free agent.
- September 1, 1983 – Purchased Alfonso Pulido from Mexico City Reds (Mexican).
- September 7, 1983 – Traded Randy Niemann to the Chicago White Sox. Received Mike Maitland (minors) and Miguel Diloné.

== Farm system ==
Level	Team	League	Manager
AAA	Hawaii Islanders	Pacific Coast League	Tom Trebelhorn
AA	Lynn Pirates	Eastern League	Tommy Sandt
A	Alexandria Dukes	Carolina League	Johnny Lipon
A	Greenwood Pirates	South Atlantic League	Joe Frisina
A-Short Season	Watertown Pirates	New York–Penn League	Bill Bryk
Rookie	GCL Pirates	Gulf Coast League	Woody Huyke
