= 1983 Chicago Cubs season =

1983 Chicago Cubs
- League: National League
- Division: East
- Ballpark: Wrigley Field
- City: Chicago
- Record: 71–91 (.438)
- Divisional place: 5th
- Owners: Tribune Company
- General managers: Dallas Green
- Managers: Lee Elia (before August 22), Charlie Fox (after August 22)
- Television: WGN-TV (Harry Caray, Steve Stone, Milo Hamilton)
- Radio: WGN (Milo Hamilton, Vince Lloyd, Lou Boudreau, Harry Caray)
- Stats: ESPN.com; Baseball Reference

The 1983 Chicago Cubs season was the 112th season of the Chicago Cubs franchise, the 108th in the National League and the 68th at Wrigley Field. The Cubs finished fifth in the National League East with a record of 71–91.

== Offseason ==
- October 15, 1982: Herman Segelke was traded by the Cubs to the San Francisco Giants for Alan Hargesheimer.
- December 9, 1982: Steve Henderson was traded by the Cubs to the Seattle Mariners for Rich Bordi.
- December 10, 1982: Wayne Nordhagen was signed as a free agent by the Cubs.
- January 19, 1983: Dan Cataline and Vance Lovelace were traded by the Cubs to the Los Angeles Dodgers for Ron Cey.
- January 25, 1983: Scott Fletcher, Pat Tabler, Randy Martz, and Dick Tidrow were traded by the Cubs to the Chicago White Sox for Steve Trout and Warren Brusstar.
- February 7, 1983: Butch Benton was traded by the Cubs to the Montreal Expos for Jerry Manuel.

== Regular season ==
=== Season standings ===
NL East
Team	W	L	Pct.	GB	Home	Road
Philadelphia Phillies	90	72	.556	—	50‍–‍31	40‍–‍41
Pittsburgh Pirates	84	78	.519	6	41‍–‍40	43‍–‍38
Montreal Expos	82	80	.506	8	46‍–‍35	36‍–‍45
St. Louis Cardinals	79	83	.488	11	44‍–‍37	35‍–‍46
Chicago Cubs	71	91	.438	19	43‍–‍38	28‍–‍53
New York Mets	68	94	.420	22	41‍–‍41	27‍–‍53

=== Record vs. opponents ===
1983 National League record Sources:
Team	ATL	CHC	CIN	HOU	LAD	MON	NYM	PHI	PIT	SD	SF	STL
Atlanta	—	5–7	12–6	11–7	7–11	7–5	8–4	7–5	6–6	9–9	9–9	7–5
Chicago	7–5	—	4–8	5–7	6–6	7–11	9–9	5–13	9–9	5–7	4–8	10–8
Cincinnati	6–12	8–4	—	5–13	7–11	4–8	7–5	6–6	6–6	9–9	10–8	6–6
Houston	7–11	7–5	13–5	—	6–12	8–4	9–3	4–8	6–6	11–7	12–6	2–10
Los Angeles	11–7	6–6	11–7	12–6	—	7–5	7–5	11–1	6–6	6–12–1	5–13	9–3
Montreal	5–7	11–7	8–4	4–8	5–7	—	8–10	8–10–1	8–10	8–4	8–4	9–9
New York	4–8	9–9	5–7	3–9	5–7	10–8	—	6–12	9–9	6–6	5–7	6–12
Philadelphia	5-7	13–5	6–6	8–4	1–11	10–8–1	12–6	—	11–7	5–7	5–7	14–4
Pittsburgh	6–6	9–9	6–6	6–6	6–6	10–8	9–9	7–11	—	9–3	6–6	10–8
San Diego	9–9	7–5	9–9	7–11	12–6–1	4–8	6–6	7–5	3–9	—	11–7	6–6
San Francisco	9–9	8–4	8–10	6–12	13–5	4–8	7–5	7–5	6–6	7–11	—	4–8
St. Louis	5–7	8–10	6–6	10–2	3–9	9–9	12–6	4–14	8–10	6–6	8–4	—

=== Notable transactions ===
- April 1, 1983: The Cubs traded a player to be named later and cash to the Milwaukee Brewers for Steve Lake. The Cubs completed the deal by sending Rich Buonantony (minors) to the Brewers on October 24.
- May 22, 1983: Willie Hernández was traded by the Cubs to the Philadelphia Phillies for Dick Ruthven and Bill Johnson.
- June 9, 1983: Wayne Nordhagen was released by the Cubs.
- June 28, 1983: Rick Reuschel was signed as a free agent by the Cubs.

==== Draft picks ====
- June 6, 1983: 1983 Major League Baseball draft
  - Rich Amaral was drafted by the Cubs in the 2nd round. Player signed June 10, 1983.
  - Jacob Brumfield was drafted by the Cubs in the 7th round. Player signed June 9, 1983.

== Roster ==
1983 Chicago Cubs
Roster
Pitchers: 42 Rich Bordi; 41 Warren Brusstar; 39 Bill Campbell; 50 Alan Hargesheimer; 38 Willie Hernández; 31 Ferguson Jenkins; 37 Bill Johnson; 32 Craig Lefferts; 37 Paul Moskau; 48 Dickie Noles; 52 Reggie Patterson; 36 Mike Proly; 30 Chuck Rainey; 47 Rick Reuschel; 44 Dick Ruthven; 43 Don Schulze; 46 Lee Smith; 34 Steve Trout	Catchers: 7 Jody Davis; 15 Mike Diaz; 16 Steve Lake; Infielders: 1 Larry Bowa; 22 Bill Buckner; 11 Ron Cey; 26 Fritzie Connally; 15 Junior Kennedy; 12 Carmelo Martínez; 19 Dave Owen; 17 Dan Rohn; 23 Ryne Sandberg; 29 Tom Veryzer	Outfielders: 20 Thad Bosley; 33 Joe Carter; 10 Leon Durham; 38 Tom Grant; 27 Mel Hall; 21 Jay Johnstone; 24 Jerry Morales; 6 Keith Moreland; 20 Wayne Nordhagen; 18 Scot Thompson; 25 Gary Woods; Other batters: 17 Jay Loviglio	Manager: 4 Lee Elia; 4 Charlie Fox; Coaches: 5 Rubén Amaro; 3 Billy Connors; 8 Duffy Dyer; 51 Fred Koenig; 2 John Vukovich

== Player stats ==
= Indicates team leader

=== Batting ===
==== Starters by position ====
Note: Pos = Position; G = Games played; AB = At bats; H = Hits; Avg. = Batting average; HR = Home runs; RBI = Runs batted in

Pos	Player	G	AB	H	Avg.	HR	RBI
C	Jody Davis	151	510	138	.271	24	84
1B	Bill Buckner	153	626	175	.280	16	66
2B	Ryne Sandberg	158	633	165	.261	8	48
SS	Larry Bowa	147	499	133	.267	2	43
3B	Ron Cey	159	581	160	.275	24	90
LF	Leon Durham	100	337	87	.258	12	55
CF	Mel Hall	112	410	116	.283	17	56
RF	Keith Moreland	154	533	161	.302	16	70

==== Other batters ====
Note: G = Games played; AB = At bats; H = Hits; Avg. = Batting average; HR = Home runs; RBI = Runs batted in

Player	G	AB	H	Avg.	HR	RBI
Gary Woods	93	190	46	.242	4	22
Jay Johnstone	86	140	36	.257	6	22
Carmelo Martínez	29	89	23	.258	6	16
Tom Veryzer	59	88	18	.205	1	3
Scot Thompson	53	88	17	.193	0	10
Jerry Morales	63	87	17	.195	0	11
Steve Lake	38	85	22	.259	1	7
Thad Bosley	43	72	21	.292	2	12
Joe Carter	23	51	9	.176	0	1
Wayne Nordhagen	21	35	5	.143	0	4
Dan Rohn	23	31	12	.387	0	6
Dave Owen	16	22	2	.091	0	2
Junior Kennedy	17	22	3	.136	0	3
Tom Grant	16	20	3	.150	0	2
Fritzie Connally	8	10	1	.100	0	0
Mike Diaz	6	7	2	.286	0	1
Jay Loviglio	1	1	0	.000	0	0

=== Pitching ===
==== Starting pitchers ====
Note: G = Games pitched; IP = Innings pitched; W = Wins; L = Losses; ERA = Earned run average; SO = Strikeouts

Player	G	IP	W	L	ERA	SO
Chuck Rainey	34	191.0	14	13	4.48	84
Steve Trout	34	180.0	10	14	4.65	80
Ferguson Jenkins	33	167.1	6	9	4.30	96
Dick Ruthven	25	149.1	12	9	4.10	73
Dickie Noles	24	116.1	5	10	4.72	59
Rick Reuschel	4	20.2	1	1	3.92	9

==== Other pitchers ====
Note: G = Games pitched; IP = Innings pitched; W = Wins; L = Losses; ERA = Earned run average; SO = Strikeouts

Player	G	IP	W	L	ERA	SO
Paul Moskau	8	32.0	3	2	6.75	16
Reggie Patterson	5	18.2	1	2	4.82	10
Don Schulze	4	14.0	0	1	7.07	8

==== Relief pitchers ====
Note: G = Games pitched; W = Wins; L = Losses; SV = Saves; ERA = Earned run average; SO = Strikeouts

Player	G	W	L	SV	ERA	SO
Lee Smith	66	4	10	29	1.65	91
Bill Campbell	82	6	8	8	4.49	97
Mike Proly	60	1	5	1	3.58	31
Warren Brusstar	59	3	1	1	2.35	46
Craig Lefferts	56	3	4	1	3.13	60
Rich Bordi	11	0	2	1	4.97	20
Willie Hernández	11	1	0	1	3.20	18
Bill Johnson	10	1	0	0	4.38	4
Alan Hargesheimer	5	0	0	0	9.00	5

== Awards and honors ==
=== Records ===
- Bill Buckner, National League record (since broken), Most Assists in One Season (161)

== Farm system ==
Level	Team	League	Manager
AAA	Iowa Cubs	American Association	Jim Napier
AA	Midland Cubs	Texas League	Tom Harmon
A	Salinas Spurs	California League	George Enright
A	Quad Cities Cubs	Midwest League	Larry Cox
A-Short Season	Geneva Cubs	New York–Penn League	Tony Franklin
Rookie	Pikeville Cubs	Appalachian League	Jim Fairey
