= 1983 Atlanta Braves season =

1983 Atlanta Braves
- League: National League
- Division: West
- Ballpark: Atlanta–Fulton County Stadium
- City: Atlanta
- Record: 88–74 (.543)
- Divisional place: 2nd
- Owners: Ted Turner
- General managers: John Mullen
- Managers: Joe Torre
- Television: WTBS; Superstation WTBS
- Radio: WSB (Ernie Johnson, Pete Van Wieren, Skip Caray, John Sterling)

The 1983 Atlanta Braves season was the 18th season in Atlanta along with the 113th overall.

== Offseason ==
- March 29, 1982: Luis Gomez was released by the Atlanta Braves.

== Regular season ==
The 1983 season was one of hope for the Braves of Atlanta. The previous season they had won 89 games and advanced to the playoffs before succumbing to the St. Louis Cardinals in three consecutive games. This was a season to prove that the 1982 National League West Division champions were no fluke.

Atlanta opened the season April 4 in Cincinnati. The Braves grabbed an early 3–0 lead in the game only to lose it 5–4. Atlanta promptly won 13 of its next 15 games and found themselves in first place with a 13–3 record. This included a seven-game winning streak after the opening day loss and a five-game winning streak that finished the 13–2 stretch. It appeared the Braves were no flukes after all. They were off to another great start and fans were hopeful that their Braves would win another NL Western Division Championship.

There was a stretch in late May and early June when Atlanta won seven of eight games to improve their mark to 34–17. However, they were in second place and trailed the Dodgers by 1 1/2 games. On June 5 the Braves lost 8–3 to the Cardinals but remained 1 1/2 games behind Los Angeles. On June 7 the Dodgers were in Atlanta for a three-game series. LA lost the opener 4–1 to Pascual Perez and their lead over the Braves was a mere half game. LA however bounced back to defeat the Braves twice, 11–5 and 4–2, expanding their lead over the Braves to 2 1/2 games. On June 22 the Braves had slipped to 39–29 and were 4 1/2 games behind LA. Atlanta had posted a 5–12 record from June 8 to 22.

This began to change for the Braves however. They won 10 of 12 games from June 24 to the All-Star Break. That streak moved them into first place all by themselves on July 4 with a 49–31 record and a one-game lead over the Dodgers. It was the best record in all Major League Baseball. It appeared the Braves were for real after all.

Second Half

The Braves were 61–37 on Sunday, July 24, coming off a 12–4 rout of Philadelphia. Atlanta had a 4 1/2-game lead in their division. It was also the second consecutive season the Braves had started 61–37. In 1982, the Braves lost 19 of their next 21 games after the 61–37 start. In 1983, it was hoped they would do better.

On Monday Atlanta blew a ninth-inning 4–1 lead to the Mets to slip to 61–38. On Tuesday the Braves lost 2–1 to the Mets in ten innings on a homer by Mookie Wilson. The Braves were 61–39 and already fans on WSB radio were complaining about another Braves collapse. However, the Braves won three of their next four to go to 64–40 and a six-game lead in the Western Division on July 30. On Thursday August 4 Atlanta routed the San Francisco Giants 8–1 to raise their record to 67–42. It was the first time since coming to Atlanta in 1966 that the Braves were 25 games above the .500 mark. The Braves also had a 6 1/2-game lead. However, on Friday and Saturday the Dodgers beat Atlanta 2–1 and 4–2 to reduce the lead to 4 1/2. The Braves salvaged the final game of the series with a 5–2 win on Sunday, upping their lead back to 5 1/2 games.

The Braves were 71–46 on Saturday, August 13, after beating the LA Dodgers 8–7 on a Bob Watson come from behind homer in the bottom of the ninth. The Braves were 6 1/2 games ahead of the Dodgers at this point. Braves fans were extremely enthusiastic and confident.

The next day the Braves lost 5–4 to the Dodgers and then on Monday August 15 they not only lost 4–0 to the San Diego Padres but they lost their cleanup hitter Bob Horner to a season-ending wrist injury. Horner was batting .303 with 20 homers at that point. His loss would prove to be a disaster for the Braves.

After Horner's injury the Braves spiraled down and were soon overtaken by the Dodgers. On August 29 the Braves slipped into second place behind LA with a 7–5 loss to the Chicago Cubs. This loss was the first of six straight. Overall, the Braves lost nine of ten games from August 25 to September 3, going from 75–51 and two games ahead to 76–60 and 3 1/2 out. On Sunday September 11 the Braves led Los Angeles 6–3 going into the bottom of the ninth. They were two games behind and were in position to cut the Dodger lead to one game. However, LA rallied to win 7–6, and their lead was three games over the Braves.

Atlanta trailed by as much as 5 1/2 games (September 23) following an 11–2 blowout at the hands of the Dodgers. The Braves were 82–70 at this point and were 11–24 since Watson's dramatic home run in August. Atlanta beat the Dodgers the next two games 3–2 and 7–1 to cut their deficit to 3 1/2 games. After splitting a two-game series with San Francisco, the Braves won two of three from the Houston Astros, and, with three games left in the season, the Braves were three games out. Atlanta lost to the San Diego Padres 3–2 on Friday night to fall four games out, eliminated from the playoffs. The Braves finished three games behind the Dodgers. It was a season of extreme excitement followed by profound disappointment.

=== Season standings ===
NL West
Team	W	L	Pct.	GB	Home	Road
Los Angeles Dodgers	91	71	.562	—	48‍–‍32	43‍–‍39
Atlanta Braves	88	74	.543	3	46‍–‍34	42‍–‍40
Houston Astros	85	77	.525	6	46‍–‍36	39‍–‍41
San Diego Padres	81	81	.500	10	47‍–‍34	34‍–‍47
San Francisco Giants	79	83	.488	12	43‍–‍38	36‍–‍45
Cincinnati Reds	74	88	.457	17	36‍–‍45	38‍–‍43

=== Record vs. opponents ===
1983 National League record Sources:
Team	ATL	CHC	CIN	HOU	LAD	MON	NYM	PHI	PIT	SD	SF	STL
Atlanta	—	5–7	12–6	11–7	7–11	7–5	8–4	7–5	6–6	9–9	9–9	7–5
Chicago	7–5	—	4–8	5–7	6–6	7–11	9–9	5–13	9–9	5–7	4–8	10–8
Cincinnati	6–12	8–4	—	5–13	7–11	4–8	7–5	6–6	6–6	9–9	10–8	6–6
Houston	7–11	7–5	13–5	—	6–12	8–4	9–3	4–8	6–6	11–7	12–6	2–10
Los Angeles	11–7	6–6	11–7	12–6	—	7–5	7–5	11–1	6–6	6–12–1	5–13	9–3
Montreal	5–7	11–7	8–4	4–8	5–7	—	8–10	8–10–1	8–10	8–4	8–4	9–9
New York	4–8	9–9	5–7	3–9	5–7	10–8	—	6–12	9–9	6–6	5–7	6–12
Philadelphia	5-7	13–5	6–6	8–4	1–11	10–8–1	12–6	—	11–7	5–7	5–7	14–4
Pittsburgh	6–6	9–9	6–6	6–6	6–6	10–8	9–9	7–11	—	9–3	6–6	10–8
San Diego	9–9	7–5	9–9	7–11	12–6–1	4–8	6–6	7–5	3–9	—	11–7	6–6
San Francisco	9–9	8–4	8–10	6–12	13–5	4–8	7–5	7–5	6–6	7–11	—	4–8
St. Louis	5–7	8–10	6–6	10–2	3–9	9–9	12–6	4–14	8–10	6–6	8–4	—

=== Notable transactions ===
- June 6, 1983: Jay Buhner was drafted by the Braves in the 9th round of the 1983 Major League Baseball draft, but did not sign.
- July 10, 1983: Paul Assenmacher was signed as an amateur free agent by the Braves.
- August 28, 1983: Braves traded Brett Butler, Brook Jacoby, and Rick Behenna to the Cleveland Indians for Len Barker.

=== Roster ===
1983 Atlanta Braves
Roster
Pitchers: 39 Len Barker; 32 Steve Bedrosian; 49 Rick Behenna; 40 Tommy Boggs; 48 Tony Brizzolara; 37 Rick Camp; 30 Ken Dayley; 49 Jeff Dedmon; 33 Pete Falcone; 51 Terry Forster; 26 Gene Garber; 42 Rick Mahler; 29 Craig McMurtry; 31 Donnie Moore; 35 Phil Niekro; 27 Pascual Pérez; 43 Bob Walk	Catchers: 20 Bruce Benedict; 24 Larry Owen; 4 Biff Pocoroba; 14 Matt Sinatro; Infielders: 10 Chris Chambliss; 5 Bob Horner; 17 Glenn Hubbard; 47 Brook Jacoby; 6 Randy Johnson; 11 Mike Jorgensen; 28 Gerald Perry; 16 Rafael Ramírez; 1 Jerry Royster; 12 Paul Runge; 11 Ken Smith; 8 Bob Watson; 18 Paul Zuvella	Outfielders: 22 Brett Butler; 2 Albert Hall; 19 Terry Harper; 7 Brad Komminsk; 3 Dale Murphy; 15 Claudell Washington	Manager: 9 Joe Torre; Coaches: 23 Tommie Aaron; 45 Bob Gibson; 36 Sonny Jackson; 53 Dal Maxvill; 52 Joe Pignatano; 54 Rube Walker

== Player stats ==
= Indicates team leader

= Indicates league leader

=== Batting ===
==== Starters by position ====
Note: Pos = Position; G = Games played; AB = At bats; H = Hits; Avg. = Batting average; HR = Home runs; RBI = Runs batted in

Pos	Player	G	AB	H	Avg.	HR	RBI
C	Bruce Benedict	134	423	126	.298	2	43
1B	Chris Chambliss	131	447	125	.280	20	78
2B	Glenn Hubbard	148	517	136	.263	12	70
SS	Rafael Ramírez	152	622	185	.297	7	58
3B	Bob Horner	104	386	117	.303	20	68
LF	Brett Butler	151	549	154	.281	5	37
CF	Dale Murphy	162	589	178	.302	36	121
RF	Claudell Washington	134	496	138	.278	9	44

==== Other batters ====
Note: G = Games played; AB = At bats; H = Hits; Avg. = Batting average; HR = Home runs; RBI = Runs batted in

Player	G	AB	H	Avg.	HR	RBI
Jerry Royster	91	268	63	.235	3	30
Terry Harper	80	201	53	.264	3	26
Bob Watson	65	149	46	.309	6	37
Randy Johnson	86	144	36	.250	1	17
Biff Pocoroba	55	120	32	.267	2	16
Mike Jorgensen	57	48	12	.250	1	8
Gerald Perry	27	39	14	.359	1	6
Brad Komminsk	19	36	8	.222	0	4
Larry Owen	17	17	2	.118	0	1
Matt Sinatro	7	12	2	.167	0	2
Ken Smith	30	12	2	.167	1	2
Albert Hall	10	8	0	.000	0	0
Paul Runge	5	8	2	.250	0	1
Brook Jacoby	4	8	0	.000	0	0
Paul Zuvella	3	5	0	.000	0	0

=== Pitching ===
==== Starting pitchers ====
Note: G = Games pitched; IP = Innings pitched; W = Wins; L = Losses; ERA = Earned run average; SO = Strikeouts

Player	G	IP	W	L	ERA	SO
Craig McMurtry	36	224.2	15	9	3.08	105
Pascual Pérez	33	215.1	15	8	3.43	144
Phil Niekro	34	201.2	11	10	3.97	128
Len Barker	6	33.0	1	3	3.82	21
Bob Walk	1	3.2	0	0	7.36	4

==== Other pitchers ====
Note: G = Games pitched; IP = Innings pitched; W = Wins; L = Losses; ERA = Earned run average; SO = Strikeouts

Player	G	IP	W	L	ERA	SO
Rick Camp	40	140.0	10	9	3.79	61
Pete Falcone	33	106.2	9	4	3.63	59
Ken Dayley	24	104.2	5	8	4.30	70
Rick Behenna	14	37.1	3	3	4.58	17

==== Relief pitchers ====
Note: G = Games pitched; W = Wins; L = Losses; SV = Saves; ERA = Earned run average; SO = Strikeouts

Player	G	W	L	SV	ERA	SO
Steve Bedrosian	70	9	10	19	3.60	114
Terry Forster	56	3	2	13	2.16	54
Gene Garber	43	4	5	9	4.60	45
Donnie Moore	43	2	3	6	3.67	41
Tony Brizzolara	14	1	0	1	3.54	17
Rick Mahler	10	0	0	0	5.02	7
Tommy Boggs	5	0	0	0	5.68	5
Jeff Dedmon	5	0	0	0	13.50	3

== Farm system ==
Level	Team	League	Manager
AAA	Richmond Braves	International League	Eddie Haas
AA	Savannah Braves	Southern League	Bobby Dews
A	Durham Bulls	Carolina League	Brian Snitker
A	Anderson Braves	South Atlantic League	Rick Albert
Rookie	Pulaski Braves	Appalachian League	Buddy Bailey
Rookie	GCL Braves	Gulf Coast League	Pedro González
