= George Bjorkman =

American baseball player (born 1956)

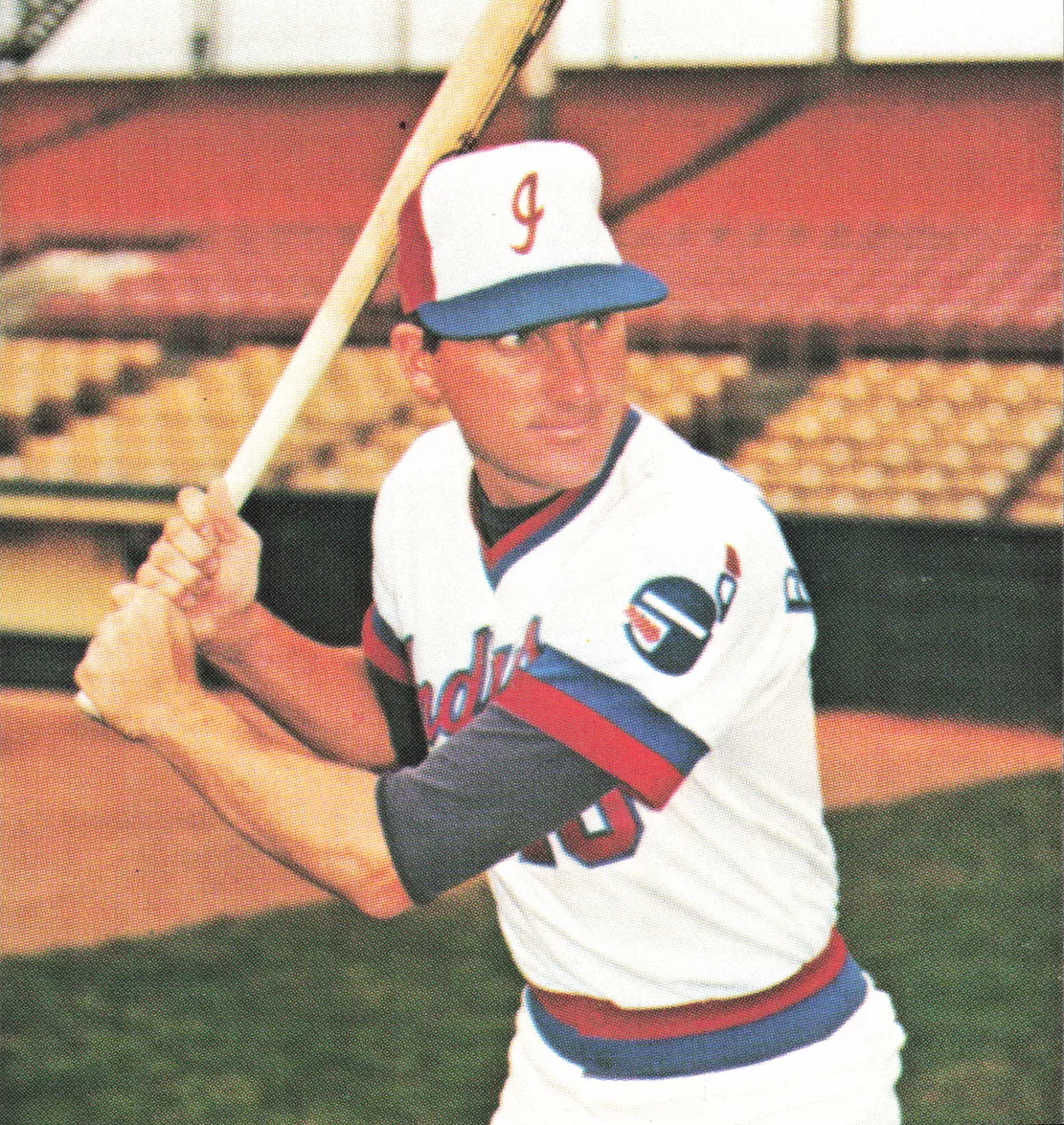
- Bjorkman with the Indianapolis Indians c. 1984
- Catcher
- Born: August 26, 1956 (age 69); Ontario, California, U.S.
- Batted: Right Threw: Right

MLB debut
- July 10, 1983, for the Houston Astros

Last MLB appearance
- October 2, 1983, for the Houston Astros

MLB statistics
- Fielding percentage: .993
- Putouts: 136
- Assists: 16
- Stats at Baseball Reference

Teams
- Houston Astros (1983)

George Anton Bjorkman (born August 26, 1956) is an American former catcher in Major League Baseball who played for the Houston Astros in its 1983 season. Prior to his stint with the Astros, Bjorkman played baseball at Chaffey Junior College and Oral Roberts University.

== Biography ==
Bjorkman was born in Ontario, California. He played college baseball at Chaffey Junior College and Oral Roberts University. Bjorkman was the catcher for the 1978 Oral Roberts team that made the only College World Series appearance in the school's history. He hit his 16th and 17th home runs of the season on the day that the team clinched a berth in the NCAA Midwest Regional playoff. The team advanced from the Midwest Regional to the College World Series. Oral Roberts was eliminated after three games, but Bjorkman hit 5-for-11 and scored four runs during the series.

The St. Louis Cardinals selected Bjorkman in the fourth round of the 1978 MLB draft. Playing for the organization's Rookie and Class A affiliates that year, he hit for a combined .259 batting average and 10 home runs in 58 games. He stayed in the St. Louis minor league system for until he was drafted by the San Francisco Giants in the 1980 Rule 5 Draft. The Giants returned him to the Cardinals by the following April. With the AA Springfield Redbirds, Bjorkman had his best professional season in 1981. He hit 28 home runs in 107 games that year, but his home run total was cut in half the next year when the Redbirds moved to Louisville.

The St. Louis organization traded him to the Houston Astros in 1983, receiving a player named Geoff Meadows in return. That year he played for the Class AA Columbus Astros and the Class AAA Tucson Toros before he was called up to the major league team between July 10 and October 2. He replaced starting catcher Alan Ashby during an injury. He hit .227 in 29 games. The Astros traded Bjorkman to the Montreal Expos just before the 1984 season and Bjorkman played AAA baseball through 1985.

His only major league baseball card appeared in the 1984 Topps set.
