= Bill Dawley =

American baseball player (born 1958)

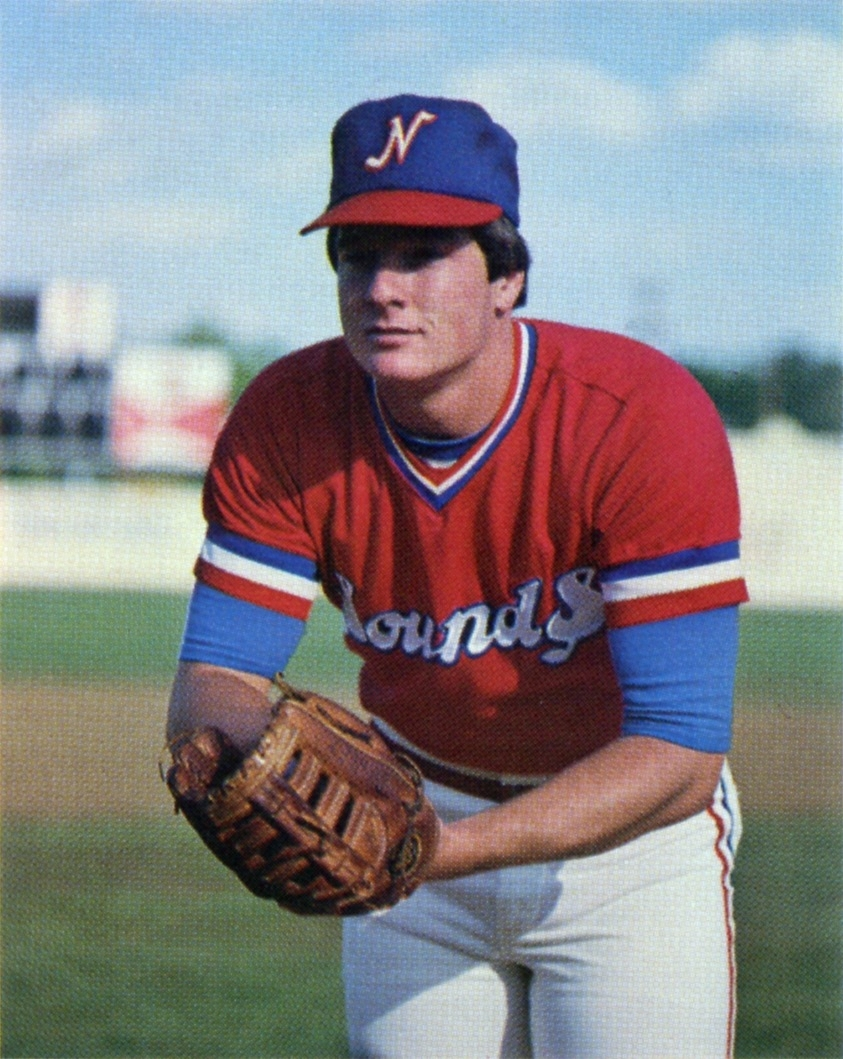
- Dawley with the Nashville Sounds in 1979
- Pitcher
- Born: February 6, 1958 (age 67); Norwich, Connecticut, U.S.
- Batted: Right Threw: Right

MLB debut
- April 15, 1983, for the Houston Astros

Last MLB appearance
- July 4, 1989, for the Oakland Athletics

MLB statistics
- Win–loss record: 27–30
- Earned run average: 3.42
- Strikeouts: 292
- Stats at Baseball Reference

Teams
- Houston Astros (1983–1985); Chicago White Sox (1986); St. Louis Cardinals (1987); Philadelphia Phillies (1988); Oakland Athletics (1989)

Career highlights and awards
- All-Star (1983)

William Chester Dawley (born February 6, 1958) is an American former professional baseball pitcher. He played all or part of seven seasons in Major League Baseball (MLB), from 1983 to 1989, for the Houston Astros, Chicago White Sox, St. Louis Cardinals, Philadelphia Phillies, and Oakland Athletics. Dawley was used exclusively as a relief pitcher during his major league career, appearing in 275 games as a reliever.

== Professional career ==
=== Reds farm system ===
Dawley was drafted out of Griswold High School in the seventh round of the 1976 Major League Baseball draft by the Cincinnati Reds. Over the next six seasons, he worked his way up through the Reds' farm system as a starting pitcher, pitching substantially in relief only in 1980 with the Indianapolis Indians. During spring training in 1983, he was traded to the Astros along with infielder Tony Walker in exchange for backup catcher Alan Knicely.

=== 1983: All-Star rookie ===
Dawley made the Astros roster out of spring training as a relief pitcher. Despite having little experience out of the bullpen, Dawley got off to a great start, being chosen for and playing in the All-Star Game after going 5–2 with a 1.88 earned-run average before the All-Star break. Dawley finished his rookie season with a 6–6 record and a 2.82 ERA and 14 saves.

In the All-Star Game itself, Dawley took the mound for the National League with two outs in the bottom of the third inning after the American League's Fred Lynn hit the first grand slam in All-Star history off Atlee Hammaker. Dawley retired Jim Rice on a pop fly to end the third, then retired George Brett on a flyout and struck out Lance Parrish. After giving up a single to Dave Winfield, he got Manny Trillo to fly out to end the inning. Dickie Thon, his teammate with the Astros, then batted for him in the fifth inning.

=== Remaining career ===
In 1984, Dawley set career highs in several categories, going 11–4 with a 1.93 ERA. However, he never again matched the success of his first two seasons. After slumping to a 5–3 record and a 3.56 ERA in 1985, he was released at the end of spring training in 1986. He signed with the White Sox, and although his ERA did bounce back slightly to 3.32, he failed to win a game, going 0–7 with 2 saves.

During the next offseason, Dawley was traded to the Cardinals for infielder Fred Manrique. Dawley's numbers continued to decline as he posted an ERA of 4.47 while losing a career-high eight games against five wins, and he was left off the team's postseason roster.

He was released by the Cardinals that winter, signing with the Phillies. He started the season with two losses in his first five appearances, posting an ERA of 17.05 before being sent to the minors in mid-May. He spent most of 1988 season with the minor league Maine Phillies before returning to the majors in September, but appeared in just three more games, then was released again.

Prior to the 1989 season, Dawley signed a minor league contract with Oakland. He started the season with the Tacoma Tigers, where he earned a return trip to the majors by posting a 3–1 record with 3 saves and a 2.56 ERA along with 44 strikeouts in 38.2 innings pitched. On June 23, he threw four scoreless innings against the Toronto Blue Jays. On July 4, however, he gave up four runs in just 2/3 of an inning against the Kansas City Royals. He was returned to Tacoma, then released on July 27. He was signed by the Milwaukee Brewers the next day. He finished the season with their top farm club, the Denver Zephyrs and became a free agent after the season, ending his professional career.
