= Pat Larkin =

American baseball player (born 1960)

- Pitcher
- Born: June 14, 1960 (age 66); Arcadia, California
- Batted: Left Threw: Left

MLB debut
- July 16, 1983, for the San Francisco Giants

Last MLB appearance
- August 1, 1983, for the San Francisco Giants

MLB statistics
- Win–loss record: 0–0
- Earned run average: 4.35
- Strikeouts: 6
- Stats at Baseball Reference

Teams
- San Francisco Giants (1983)

Patrick Clibborn Larkin (born June 14, 1960) is an American former professional baseball pitcher. He was signed by the San Francisco Giants as an amateur free agent in 1982, and a little over a year later he was in the major leagues. His MLB career spanned a little over two weeks, during which he pitched five games, all in relief. He was traded to the Detroit Tigers the following February, and after spending the 1984 season in their farm system, his career was over at age 24.

== Sources ==
- Career statistics from Baseball Reference · Baseball Reference (Minors) · Retrosheet · Baseball Almanac, or Retrosheet
