= Alan Knicely =

American baseball player (born 1955)

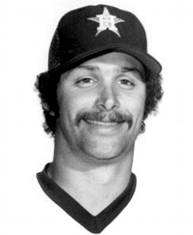
- Knicely in 1983 photo
- Catcher
- Born: May 19, 1955 (age 71); Harrisonburg, Virginia, U.S.
- Batted: Right Threw: Right

MLB debut
- August 12, 1979, for the Houston Astros

Last MLB appearance
- October 4, 1986, for the St. Louis Cardinals

MLB statistics
- Batting average: .213
- Home runs: 12
- Runs batted in: 61
- Stats at Baseball Reference

Teams
- Houston Astros (1979–1982); Cincinnati Reds (1983–1985); Philadelphia Phillies (1985); St. Louis Cardinals (1986)

Alan Lee Knicely (born May 19, 1955) is an American former professional baseball catcher who played all or parts of eight seasons in Major League Baseball (MLB), from 1979 until 1986. He served mainly as a backup catcher for four teams during that time, while also playing some first base and outfield.

== Playing career ==
=== Astros organization ===
==== Early career ====
Knicely was drafted by the Houston Astros in the third round (63rd overall) of the 1974 Major League Baseball draft as a pitcher out of Turner Ashby High School in Bridgewater, VA. He slowly moved up through their farm system as far as Double-A, reaching that level in 1977. After going 1–5 with an ERA over 5.00 with the Columbus Astros of the Southern League, his conversion to a position player commenced. The next season, back at Columbus, he played mostly shortstop, but by 1979 he was playing mostly behind the plate.

==== 1979: Breakout season ====
Knicely played for Columbus once again in 1979, hitting 33 home runs and batting .289. He shared the Southern League Most Valuable Player Award with fellow Astros prospect Danny Heep, and saw action in seven major league games down the stretch, mostly as a pinch hitter, but also playing parts of three games at catcher and one at third base. However, he went 0-for-6 at the plate.

==== Early 1980s with the Astros ====
Knicely was promoted a level for the 1980 season, playing for the Triple-A Tucson Toros. He continued to hit well, batting .318 with 105 RBI, but the Astros had Alan Ashby and Luis Pujols ahead of him, and Knicely's defense was not up to par. He was called up once again in September, but his action was limited to a single pinch-hitting appearance.

In 1981, it was back to the Triple-A Toros for Knicely. His defense improved, as he cut his errors in half, and he once again had a good season with the bat, hitting .306 with 96 RBI. Once again, however, Major League time would wait until September's roster expansion. On September 17, he got his first Major League hit, a single against John Urrea of the San Diego Padres. Even then, he did not appear in another game until the final two games of the season. Given a chance, he went 4-for-6 in those two games, with a pair of solo home runs.

Finally, in 1982, Knicely would break camp with the big club, making the roster out of spring training as a right-handed hitter off the bench for the Astros. While Ashby and Pujols were still seeing the majority of the playing time at catcher, Knicely played 23 games there as well as 17 in the outfield. Knicely's minor league batting prowess did not translate to success in the Major Leagues, as he batted just .188 with two home runs in 133 at bats. The following spring, he was traded to the Cincinnati Reds for a pair of prospects, reliever Bill Dawley and outfielder Tony Walker.

=== Mid-1980s with the Reds ===
Like 1982, Knicely spent all of 1983 in the Major Leagues. With Johnny Bench winding down his career as a third baseman, the Reds employed three catchers that season, and Knicely was the third, behind Dann Bilardello and Alex Treviño. Playing in 59 games, Knicely improved his batting average, but only up to .224. He again hit just 2 home runs in 98 at bats.

After a second disappointing season, Knicely would open the 1984 season back in the minor leagues, this time with the Wichita Aeros of the American Association. In what proved to be the Aeros' final season, Knicely showed that he still had no difficulty mastering minor league pitching. He batted .333 with 33 home runs and 126 RBI in winning the AA's Most Valuable Player award, his second such award in the minors. For his efforts, he won The Sporting News Minor League Player of the Year Award and was given another chance by the Reds that September. However, he managed just four hits in 29 at bats, although he did drive in five runs.

In 1985, Knicely got yet another chance. The Reds, tired of Bilardello's lack of hitting ability, sent the light-hitting catcher to the minors and brought Knicely back to the majors to split time behind the plate with Dave Van Gorder. Knicely responded by setting career bests in most categories, including a .253 batting average, 5 home runs, and 26 RBI. All this earned him, however, was an August trade to the Philadelphia Phillies for veteran catcher Bo Díaz. The Phillies shipped Knicely back to the minors, calling him up for just 7 hitless at bats in September.

=== Later career ===
Knicely was released by the Phillies the following spring. Four days later, he joined the St. Louis Cardinals, once again starting the season in the minor leagues. He was called up to the majors in June to play first base as part of an attempt to fill in for the injured Jack Clark. In 34 games, Knicely batted just .195 with a single home run and 6 RBI. He was released on October 31, and after a season in the minor leagues with the Texas Rangers organization, Knicely retired at age 32.
