= Jeff Heathcock =

American baseball player (born 1959)

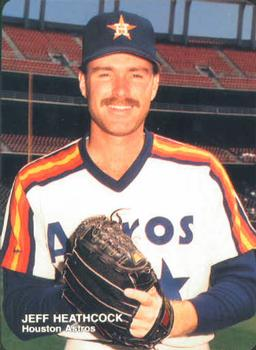
- Pitcher
- Born: November 18, 1959 (age 66); Covina, California, U.S.
- Batted: Right Threw: Right

MLB debut
- September 3, 1983, for the Houston Astros

Last MLB appearance
- September 28, 1988, for the Houston Astros

MLB statistics
- Win–loss record: 9–9
- Earned run average: 3.76
- Strikeouts: 64
- Stats at Baseball Reference

Teams
- Houston Astros (1983, 1985, 1987–1988)

Ronald Jeffrey "Jeff" Heathcock (born November 18, 1959) is a former Major League Baseball pitcher. Heathcock played for the Houston Astros for four years, 1983, 1985, 1987, and 1988.

== Baseball career ==
Heathcock was drafted three times in the MLB Draft: January 1979 by the Milwaukee Brewers (2nd round), June 1979 by the San Diego Padres (first round, 14th overall), and the Houston Astros in June 1980 (the first pick of the first round). He had gone to Golden West College in Huntington Beach, California before spending a year at Oral Roberts University.

Heathcock first played in the minors with the Astros' single-A club in Daytona Beach in the Florida State League. He went 9–0 with a 1.27 ERA before being promoted to the Astros' AA club in Columbus with the Southern League. He went 4–7 with a 5.08 ERA. He stayed on the club the following year and went 13–13 with a 5.61 ERA, and he then went 4–4 with a 3.15 ERA in 1983 before being moved up to the Tucson Toros in the AAA Pacific Coast League, where he went 10–3 with a 2.77 ERA.

Heathcock appeared on and off in four seasons for the Astros, debuting at the age of 23. He pitched two innings against the Chicago Cubs as a call-up on September 3, 1983, allowing three hits and two runs with a strikeout. He appeared in six games (three as a starter), garnering a save and a 2–1 record with twelve strikeouts to four walks.

He spent the next two years in Tucson, going a combined 8–11 with an ERA above four. He returned to the main ballclub in 1985, appearing in 14 games while pitching 56.1 innings with a 3.36 ERA and a 3–1 record with 25 strikeouts and thirteen walks. He went back to Tucson for another two years; he went 10–8 in 1986 and 11–6 in 1987, although he had an ERA above three each time. Despite this, he was brought up again late in the year, appearing in 19 games. He went 4–2 with a 3.16 ERA in 42.2 innings while striking out 15 and walking nine.

He had another stint with Tucson for 1988 and went 3–5 with a 5.08 ERA. He appeared in 17 games for the main ballclub the next year. He went 0–5 while appearing in 17 games (one as a starter), pitching 31 innings while striking out 12 with 16 walks. He made his last appearance on September 28, 1988, going 2.1 innings against the Atlanta Braves, allowing a run on three hits while taking the loss.

He went back to Tucson for the seventh and final time in 1989. He went 11–10 with a 3.73 ERA.

Heathcock's last season was with the Edmonton Trappers in 1990 (the AAA affiliate for the California Angels). He appeared in eight games while going 1–3 with a 3.76 ERA before retiring. Overall, Heathcock spent 56 games in the majors and 213 with the minor leagues.

== Personal life ==
During his baseball career, he spent the offseason working in construction, and he continued this line of work until he decided to move on from the industry, which experienced slowdown in the early 1990s. Heathcock moved to real estate analysis, specifically in appraisal for Fannie Mae, which he worked for two decades.
