= 1983 Major League Baseball All-Star Game =

1983 American baseball competition

	1	2	3	4	5	6	7	8	9	R	H	E
National League	1	0	0	1	1	0	0	0	0	3	8	3
American League	1	1	7	0	0	0	2	2	X	13	15	2
- Date: July 6, 1983
- Venue: Comiskey Park
- City: Chicago, Illinois
- Managers: Whitey Herzog (StL); Harvey Kuenn (MIL)
- MVP: Fred Lynn (CAL)
- Attendance: 43,801
- Ceremonial first pitch: Lefty Gomez
- Television: NBC
- TV announcers: Vin Scully and Joe Garagiola
- Radio: CBS
- Radio announcers: Brent Musburger, Duke Snider and Brooks Robinson

The 1983 Major League Baseball All-Star Game was the 54th edition of the midsummer classic between the all-stars of the American League (AL) and National League (NL), the two leagues comprising Major League Baseball. The game was held on July 6 at Comiskey Park in Chicago, Illinois, the home of the Chicago White Sox of the American League. The Wednesday night game resulted in a 13–3 American League victory. The game celebrated the fiftieth anniversary of the All-Star Game, and occurred exactly 50 years to the date of the first All-Star game, also at Comiskey Park. This was the 54th game, as no game was held in 1945, while two were held each year from 1959 through 1962.

This was the fifth All-Star Game played in Chicago, and the third to be hosted by the White Sox at Comiskey Park (1933, 1950), with two by the Chicago Cubs at Wrigley Field (1947, 1962).

This was the last time the All-Star Game was played in the venue where the annual exhibition began. When the White Sox next hosted the All-Star Game 20 years later in 2003, they had moved across the street to their new home at U.S. Cellular Field.

The game was the first American League win in 12 years, and only the second AL win since 1962. The 13 runs scored by the American League set a new record for one team in All-Star Game history. The 10-run margin of victory was the largest since the 12–0 American League victory in 1946.

The game is perhaps best remembered for Fred Lynn's grand slam off Atlee Hammaker of the Giants, part of a big third inning for the American League. As of 2026, it is still the only grand slam in the history of the Midsummer Classic. During that third inning, the American League set All-Star Game records for the most hits (6) and runs (7) by a single team in their half-inning - all off Hammaker.

Prior to the first pitch, Chuck Mangione played the Canadian national anthem on his flugelhorn, while the Oak Ridge Boys sang the Star-Spangled Banner. The colors were presentated by the Great Lakes Naval Training Center Color Guard, which previously presented at the 1947, 1950, and 1963 games; they did the honors again in 1990 and 2003.

For this golden anniversary, there was also an "Old Timer's Game" played on Tuesday, the day before the All-Star game. Because Independence Day was on Monday this year, the All-Star break did not begin until that evening, as the holiday included a full slate of day games.

== Rosters ==
Players in italics have since been inducted into the National Baseball Hall of Fame.

=== National League ===
Starters
Position	Player	Team	All-Star Games
P	Mario Soto	Reds	2
C	Gary Carter	Expos	6
1B	Al Oliver	Expos	7
2B	Steve Sax	Dodgers	2
3B	Mike Schmidt	Phillies	8
SS	Ozzie Smith	Cardinals	3
OF	Andre Dawson	Expos	3
OF	Dale Murphy	Braves	3
OF	Tim Raines	Expos	3

Pitchers
Position	Player	Team	All-Star Games
P	Bill Dawley	Astros	1
P	Dave Dravecky	Padres	1
P	Atlee Hammaker	Giants	1
P	Gary Lavelle	Giants	2
P	Jesse Orosco	Mets	1
P	Pascual Pérez	Braves	1
P	Steve Rogers	Expos	5
P	Lee Smith	Cubs	1
P	Fernando Valenzuela	Dodgers	3

Reserves
Position	Player	Team	All-Star Games
C	Bruce Benedict	Braves	2
C	Terry Kennedy	Padres	2
1B	Darrell Evans	Giants	2
1B	George Hendrick	Cardinals	4
2B	Glenn Hubbard	Braves	1
3B	Johnny Bench	Reds	14
3B	Pedro Guerrero	Dodgers	2
3B	Bill Madlock	Pirates	3
SS	Dickie Thon	Astros	1
OF	Leon Durham	Cubs	2
OF	Willie McGee	Cardinals	1

=== American League ===
Starters
Position	Player	Team	All-Star Games
P	Dave Stieb	Blue Jays	3
C	Ted Simmons	Brewers	8
1B	Rod Carew	Angels	17
2B	Manny Trillo	Indians	4
3B	George Brett	Royals	8
SS	Robin Yount	Brewers	3
OF	Fred Lynn	Angels	9
OF	Jim Rice	Red Sox	5
OF	Dave Winfield	Yankees	7

Pitchers
Position	Player	Team	All-Star Games
P	Ron Guidry	Yankees	4
P	Rick Honeycutt	Rangers	2
P	Aurelio López	Tigers	1
P	Tippy Martinez	Orioles	1
P	Dan Quisenberry	Royals	2
P	Bob Stanley	Red Sox	2
P	Rick Sutcliffe	Indians	1
P	Matt Young	Mariners	1

Reserves
Position	Player	Team	All-Star Games
C	Bob Boone	Angels	4
C	Lance Parrish	Tigers	3
1B	Cecil Cooper	Brewers	4
1B	Eddie Murray	Orioles	4
2B	Lou Whitaker	Tigers	1
3B	Doug DeCinces	Angels	1
SS	Cal Ripken Jr.	Orioles	1
OF	Rickey Henderson	Athletics	3
OF	Ron Kittle	White Sox	1
OF	Ben Oglivie	Brewers	3
OF	Gary Ward	Twins	1
OF	Willie Wilson	Royals	2
DH	Reggie Jackson	Angels	13
DH	Carl Yastrzemski	Red Sox	18

== Game ==
=== Umpires ===
George Maloney was the last home plate umpire to work an All-Star game wearing the outside chest protector long favored by umpires in the American League. Maloney was one of only four active umpires in 1983 still using the outside protector. He and Russ Goetz retired following the 1983 season. Bill Kunkel soldiered on while battling cancer, succumbing in May 1985. Jerry Neudecker, the last outside protector holdout, retired after the 1985 season.

Home Plate	George Maloney (AL)
First Base	Harry Wendelstedt (NL)
Second Base	Ted Hendry (AL)
Third Base	Jim Quick (NL)
Left Field	John Shulock (AL)
Right Field	Dave Pallone (NL)

=== Starting lineups ===
National League				American League			
Order	Player	Team	Position	Order	Player	Team	Position
1	Steve Sax	Dodgers	2B	1	Rod Carew	Angels	1B
2	Tim Raines	Expos	LF	2	Robin Yount	Brewers	SS
3	Andre Dawson	Expos	CF	3	Fred Lynn	Angels	CF
4	Al Oliver	Expos	1B	4	Jim Rice	Red Sox	LF
5	Dale Murphy	Braves	RF	5	George Brett	Royals	3B
6	Mike Schmidt	Phillies	3B	6	Ted Simmons	Brewers	C
7	Gary Carter	Expos	C	7	Dave Winfield	Yankees	RF
8	Ozzie Smith	Cardinals	SS	8	Manny Trillo	Indians	2B
9	Mario Soto	Reds	P	9	Dave Stieb	Blue Jays	P

=== Game summary ===
Tuesday, July 6, 1983 7:40 pm (CT) at Comiskey Park in Chicago, Illinois
Team	1	2	3	4	5	6	7	8	9	R	H	E
National League	1	0	0	1	1	0	0	0	0	3	8	3
American League	1	1	7	0	0	0	2	2	X	13	15	2
WP: Dave Stieb (1-0) LP: Mario Soto (0-1); Home runs: NL: None; AL: Fred Lynn (1), Jim Rice (1)

The first inning gave notice that this would be one of the sloppiest All-Star games in history. Steve Sax led off the game by reaching on an error by AL starting pitcher Dave Stieb. Sax stole second and scored when next batter Tim Raines grounded to Stieb and Stieb threw wildly past Rod Carew at first. Raines reached third, but couldn't score as Stieb struck out the side; Andre Dawson, Dale Murphy, and Mike Schmidt all fanned.

The AL tied it in their half of the first on a sacrifice fly by George Brett and took the lead in the second on another sac fly by Robin Yount. The Giants' Atlee Hammaker came in to pitch for the NL in the bottom of the third and promptly had one of the worst innings by a pitcher in All-Star Game history. Jim Rice led off with a homer, followed by a Brett triple. Dave Winfield singled home Brett. Manny Trillo singled, and Carew drove home Winfield with a two-out single. Hammaker then intentionally walked right-handed hitter Yount to face Fred Lynn, a left-handed hitter. Lynn made the NL pay for the move with the first-ever grand slam in All-Star game history. When the dust cleared, the AL had a 9–1 lead and Hammaker had given up six hits and seven runs in an inning, both All-Star game records that still stand.

The NL gamely fought back on RBI singles by Murphy in the fourth and Sax in the fifth, but that was all they would get. In the seventh, Lou Whitaker had an RBI triple and Willie Wilson an RBI double for the AL. The AL capped off the scoring when Brett scored on a fly ball hit by Whitaker that Pedro Guerrero dropped and Rickey Henderson drove in Cecil Cooper with a groundout.
