= Tony Walker (outfielder) =

American baseball player (born 1959)

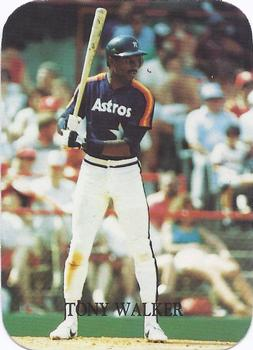
- Center fielder
- Born: July 1, 1959 (age 66); San Diego, California, U.S.
- Batted: Right Threw: Right

MLB debut
- April 8, 1986, for the Houston Astros

Last MLB appearance
- October 4, 1986, for the Houston Astros

MLB statistics
- Batting average: .222
- Home runs: 2
- Runs batted in: 10
- Stats at Baseball Reference

Teams
- Houston Astros (1986)

Anthony Bruce Walker (born July 1, 1959) is an American former professional baseball player. Walker played in the 1986 season with the Houston Astros of the Major League Baseball (MLB). He played the outfield and batted and threw right-handed.
