= 1983 Major League Baseball draft =

Baseball draft of amateur players by Major League Baseball

General information
- Date: June 1983

Overview
- 827 total selections
- First selection: Tim Belcher; Minnesota Twins
- First round selections: 28

The 1983 Major League Baseball draft took place in June 1983. The draft saw the Minnesota Twins select Tim Belcher first overall.

== First round selections ==
= All-Star	= Baseball Hall of Famer

The following are the first round picks in the 1983 Major League Baseball draft.

Pick	Player	Team	Position	Hometown/School
1	Tim Belcher *	Minnesota Twins	RHP	Mount Vernon Nazarene College
2	Kurt Stillwell	Cincinnati Reds	SS	Thousand Oaks High School
3	Jeff Kunkel	Texas Rangers	SS	Rider University
4	Eddie Williams	New York Mets	3B	Hoover High School
5	Stan Hilton	Oakland Athletics	RHP	Baylor University
6	Jackie Davidson	Chicago Cubs	RHP	Everman High School
7	Darrel Akerfelds	Seattle Mariners	RHP	Mesa State College
8	Robbie Wine	Houston Astros	C	Oklahoma State University
9	Matt Stark	Toronto Blue Jays	C	Los Altos High School
10	Ray Hayward	San Diego Padres	LHP	University of Oklahoma
11	Dave Clark	Cleveland Indians	OF	Jackson State University
12	Ron DeLucchi	Pittsburgh Pirates	OF	Campolindo High School
13	Joel Davis *	Chicago White Sox (Note: Pick from Yankees as compensation for signing of free agent Steve Kemp)	RHP	Sandalwood High School
14	Rich Stoll	Montreal Expos	RHP	University of Michigan
15	Wayne Dotson	Detroit Tigers	RHP	Estacado High School
16	Brian Holman *	Montreal Expos (Note: Pick from Giants compensation for signing of free agent Joel Youngblood)	RHP	North High School
17	Terry Bell *	Seattle Mariners (Note: Pick from White Sox as compensation for signing of free agent Floyd Bannister)	C	Old Dominion University
18	Erik Sonberg	Los Angeles Dodgers	LHP	Wichita State University
19	Roger Clemens	Boston Red Sox	RHP	University of Texas
20	Stan Jefferson *	New York Mets (Note: Pick from Braves as compensation for signing of free agent Pete Falcone)	OF	Bethune-Cookman College
21	Gary Thurman	Kansas City Royals	OF	North Central High School
22	Ricky Jordan	Philadelphia Phillies	1B	Grant High School
23	Mark Doran	California Angels	OF	University of Wisconsin
24	Jim Lindeman	St. Louis Cardinals	3B	Bradley University
25	Wayne Wilson	Baltimore Orioles	RHP	Redondo Beach High School
26	Dan Plesac	Milwaukee Brewers	LHP	North Carolina State University
27	Calvin Schiraldi *	New York Mets (Note: Supplemental pick as compensation for signing of free agent Pete Falcone)	RHP	University of Texas
28	Russ Morman *	Chicago White Sox (Note: Supplemental pick as compensation for signing of free agent Bill Almon)	OF	Wichita State University

* Did not sign

== Other notable players ==
- Bill Swift, 2nd round, 29th overall by the Minnesota Twins, but did not sign
- Chris Sabo†, 2nd round, 30th overall by the Cincinnati Reds
- Dave Magadan, 2nd round, 32nd overall by the New York Mets
- Joe Oliver, 2nd round, 41st overall by the Cincinnati Reds
- Jeff Robinson, 2nd round, 44th overall by the San Francisco Giants
- Glenn Braggs, 2nd round, 54th overall by the Milwaukee Brewers
- Rick Aguilera†, 3rd round, 57th overall by the New York Mets
- Wally Joyner†, 3rd round, 67th overall by the California Angels
- Charlie Hayes, 4th round, 96th overall by the San Francisco Giants
- Ron Gant†, 4th round, 100th overall by the Atlanta Braves
- Lenny Harris, 5th round, 108th overall by the Cincinnati Reds
- Todd Stottlemyre, 5th round, 119th overall by the New York Yankees, but did not sign
- John Burkett†, 6th round, 148th overall by the San Francisco Giants
- Erik Hanson†, 7th round, 172nd overall by the Montreal Expos, but did not sign
- Mike Aldrete, 7th round, 174th overall by the San Francisco Giants
- Tom Pagnozzi†, 8th round, 208th overall by the St. Louis Cardinals
- Jeff Montgomery†, 9th round, 212th overall by the Cincinnati Reds
- Terry Steinbach†, 9th round, 215th overall by the Oakland Athletics
- Glenallen Hill, 9th round, 219th overall by the Toronto Blue Jays
- Jay Buhner†, 9th round, 230th overall by the Atlanta Braves, but did not sign
- Jeff Parrett, 9th round, 236th overall by the Milwaukee Brewers
- Greg Cadaret, 11th round, 267th overall by the Oakland Athletics
- Doug Drabek†, 11th round, 279th overall by the Chicago White Sox
- Kevin Seitzer†, 11th round, 283rd overall by the Kansas City Royals
- John Smiley†, 12th round, 300th overall by the Pittsburgh Pirates
- John Farrell, 16th round, 403rd overall by the Cleveland Indians, but did not sign
- Mike Fetters, 22nd round, 560th overall by the Los Angeles Dodgers, but did not sign
- Jeff King, 23rd round, 573rd overall by the Chicago Cubs, but did not sign
- Matt Williams†, 27th round, 664th overall by the New York Mets, but did not sign
- Mark Lemke, 27th round, 677th overall by the Atlanta Braves
- Mike Jackson, 29th round, 721st overall by the Philadelphia Phillies, but did not sign
- Todd Zeile, 30th round, 739th overall by the Kansas City Royals, but did not sign
- Les Lancaster, 39th round, 811th overall by the Texas Rangers, but did not sign
- Glenn Davis, 42nd round, 817th overall by the Texas Rangers, but did not sign

† All-Star
‡ Hall of Famer

=== Football players drafted ===
- Turner Gill, 18th round, 457th overall by the New York Yankees, but did not sign
- D. J. Dozier, 18th round, 459th overall by the Detroit Tigers, but did not sign

Preceded by Shawon Dunston	1st Overall Picks; Tim Belcher	Succeeded by Shawn Abner
