= 1983 in baseball =

The following are the baseball events of the year 1983 throughout the world.

== Champions ==
=== Major League Baseball ===
- World Series: Baltimore Orioles over Philadelphia Phillies (4–1); Rick Dempsey, MVP

League Championship Series (ALCS, NLCS)
East	Baltimore	3
West	Chicago White Sox	1
East	Philadelphia	3
West	Los Angeles	1

World Series
AL	Baltimore	4
NL	Philadelphia	1

- American League Championship Series MVP: Mike Boddicker
- National League Championship Series MVP: Gary Matthews
- All-Star Game, July 6 at Comiskey Park: American League, 13–3; Fred Lynn, MVP

=== Other champions ===
- Caribbean World Series: Lobos de Arecibo (Puerto Rico)
- College World Series: Texas
- Japan Series: Seibu Lions over Yomiuri Giants (4–3)
- Korean Series: Haitai Tigers over MBC Chungyong
- Big League World Series: Taipei, Taiwan
- Junior League World Series: Manatí, Puerto Rico
- Little League World Series: East Marietta National, Marietta, Georgia
- Senior League World Series: Pingtung, Taiwan
- Pan American Games: Cuba over Nicaragua

== Awards and honors ==
- Baseball Hall of Fame
  - George Kell
  - Juan Marichal
  - Brooks Robinson
  - Walter Alston (manager)

Baseball Writers' Association of America Awards
BBWAA Award	National League	American League
Rookie of the Year	Darryl Strawberry (NYM)	Ron Kittle (CWS)
Cy Young Award	John Denny (PHI)	LaMarr Hoyt (CWS)
Manager of the Year	Tommy Lasorda (LAD)	Tony La Russa (CWS)
Most Valuable Player	Dale Murphy (ATL)	Cal Ripken Jr. (BAL)
Babe Ruth Award (World Series MVP)	—	Rick Dempsey (BAL)
Gold Glove Awards
Position	National League	American League
Pitcher	Phil Niekro (ATL)	Ron Guidry (NYY)
Catcher	Tony Peña (PIT)	Lance Parrish (DET)
First Baseman	Keith Hernandez (NYM/STL)	Eddie Murray (BAL)
Second Baseman	Ryne Sandberg (CHC)	Lou Whitaker (DET)
Third Baseman	Mike Schmidt (PHI)	Buddy Bell (TEX)
Shortstop	Ozzie Smith (STL)	Alan Trammell (DET)
Outfielders	Andre Dawson (MON)	Dwight Evans (BOS)
Outfielders	Willie McGee (STL)	Dwayne Murphy (OAK)
Outfielders	Dale Murphy (ATL)	Dave Winfield (NYY)

- Woman Executive of the Year (major or minor league)
  - Karen Paul, El Paso Diablos, Texas League

== Statistical leaders ==
	American League		National League	
Stat	Player	Total	Player	Total
AVG	Wade Boggs (BOS)	.361	Bill Madlock (PIT)	.323
HR	Jim Rice (BOS)	39	Mike Schmidt (PHI)	40
RBI	Cecil Cooper (MIL); Jim Rice (BOS)	126	Dale Murphy (ATL)	121
W	LaMarr Hoyt (CWS)	24	John Denny (PHI)	19
ERA	Rick Honeycutt (TEX)	2.42	Atlee Hammaker (SF)	2.25
K	Jack Morris (DET)	232	Steve Carlton (PHI)	275

== Major league baseball final standings ==
=== American League final standings ===
AL East
Team	W	L	Pct.	GB	Home	Road
^{(2)} Baltimore Orioles	98	64	.605	—	50‍–‍31	48‍–‍33
Detroit Tigers	92	70	.568	6	48‍–‍33	44‍–‍37
New York Yankees	91	71	.562	7	51‍–‍30	40‍–‍41
Toronto Blue Jays	89	73	.549	9	48‍–‍33	41‍–‍40
Milwaukee Brewers	87	75	.537	11	52‍–‍29	35‍–‍46
Boston Red Sox	78	84	.481	20	38‍–‍43	40‍–‍41
Cleveland Indians	70	92	.432	28	36‍–‍45	34‍–‍47

AL West
Team	W	L	Pct.	GB	Home	Road
^{(1)} Chicago White Sox	99	63	.611	—	55‍–‍26	44‍–‍37
Kansas City Royals	79	83	.488	20	45‍–‍36	34‍–‍47
Texas Rangers	77	85	.475	22	44‍–‍37	33‍–‍48
Oakland Athletics	74	88	.457	25	42‍–‍39	32‍–‍49
California Angels	70	92	.432	29	35‍–‍46	35‍–‍46
Minnesota Twins	70	92	.432	29	37‍–‍44	33‍–‍48
Seattle Mariners	60	102	.370	39	30‍–‍51	30‍–‍51

Locations of teams for the 1982–1988 American League seasons
West East

=== National League final standings ===
NL East
Team	W	L	Pct.	GB	Home	Road
^{(2)} Philadelphia Phillies	90	72	.556	—	50‍–‍31	40‍–‍41
Pittsburgh Pirates	84	78	.519	6	41‍–‍40	43‍–‍38
Montreal Expos	82	80	.506	8	46‍–‍35	36‍–‍45
St. Louis Cardinals	79	83	.488	11	44‍–‍37	35‍–‍46
Chicago Cubs	71	91	.438	19	43‍–‍38	28‍–‍53
New York Mets	68	94	.420	22	41‍–‍41	27‍–‍53

NL West
Team	W	L	Pct.	GB	Home	Road
^{(1)} Los Angeles Dodgers	91	71	.562	—	48‍–‍32	43‍–‍39
Atlanta Braves	88	74	.543	3	46‍–‍34	42‍–‍40
Houston Astros	85	77	.525	6	46‍–‍36	39‍–‍41
San Diego Padres	81	81	.500	10	47‍–‍34	34‍–‍47
San Francisco Giants	79	83	.488	12	43‍–‍38	36‍–‍45
Cincinnati Reds	74	88	.457	17	36‍–‍45	38‍–‍43

Locations of teams for the 1977–1992 National League seasons
West East

== Nippon Professional Baseball final standings ==
=== Central League final standings ===
Central League
Team	G	W	L	T	Pct.	GB
Yomiuri Giants	130	72	50	8	.590	–
Hiroshima Toyo Carp	130	65	55	10	.542	6.0
Yokohama Taiyo Whales	130	61	61	8	.500	11.0
Hanshin Tigers	130	62	63	5	.496	11.5
Chunichi Dragons	130	54	69	7	.439	18.5
Yakult Swallows	130	53	69	8	.434	19.0

=== Pacific League final standings ===
Pacific League
Team	G	W	L	T	Pct.	GB
Seibu Lions	130	86	40	4	.683	–
Hankyu Braves	130	67	55	8	.549	17.0
Nippon-Ham Fighters	130	64	59	7	.520	20.5
Kintetsu Buffaloes	130	52	65	13	.444	29.5
Nankai Hawks	130	52	69	9	.430	31.5
Lotte Orions	130	43	76	11	.361	39.5

== Events ==
=== January ===
- January 10 – New York Supreme Court Justice Richard Lane issues a preliminary injunction barring the Yankees from playing their season-opening series with the Detroit Tigers in Denver. The club had sought to move the games because it feared off-season renovations to Yankee Stadium would not be completed for the series April 11–13.
- January 11:
  - For the third time in eight years, New York Yankees owner George Steinbrenner hires Billy Martin as his manager. Martin's most recent job was his three-year stint (1980–1982) implementing "Billy Ball" while at the helm of the Oakland Athletics. Martin replaces Clyde King, who will move to the Bombers' front office.
  - In the January edition of the 1980 Major League Baseball draft, the Boston Red Sox select outfielder and future All-Star and Gold Glove Award-winner Ellis Burks, 18, in the first round, the 20th overall. The Chicago Cubs take outfielder and future MLB manager Dave Martinez, also 18, in the third round, 53rd overall.

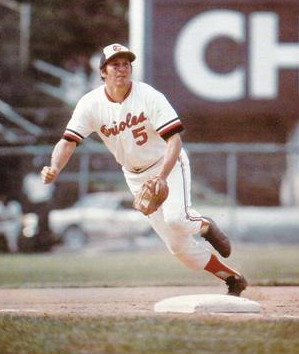
Brooks Robinson

- January 12 – Brooks Robinson and Juan Marichal are elected to the Hall of Fame by the Baseball Writers' Association of America. Robinson becomes the 14th player to be elected in his first year of eligibility.
- January 13 – Right-hander Mike Torrez' five-year tenure with the Boston Red Sox ends when he's sent to the New York Mets for a minor-league player to be named later (PTBNL), third baseman Mike Davis. Torrez, 36, is a 16-year veteran who will forever be known in Boston for allowing Bucky Dent's decisive home run in the 1978 American League East tie-breaker game.
- January 14 – Outfielder Al Cowens, granted free agency from the Seattle Mariners last November 10, opts to return to Seattle, signing a three-year, $1.2 million contract.
- January 18 – The Oakland Athletics sign shortstop Bill Almon, granted free agency from the Chicago White Sox last November 10.
- January 19 – The Los Angeles Dodgers trade third baseman Ron Cey, 34, to the Chicago Cubs for southpaw pitching prospect Vance Lovelace and minor-league outfielder Dan Cataline. The deal leaves shortstop Bill Russell as the last remaining member of the Dodgers' fabled 1970s infield of Cey, Russell, Davey Lopes and Steve Garvey. Russell will retire to a coach's job with Los Angeles after the 1986 season.
- January 20 – In the second-ever Type A free agent compensation draft, implemented after the 1981 MLB strike, the Seattle Mariners select 20-year-old outfield prospect Danny Tartabull from the Cincinnati Reds. The Mariners gain the draft pick after losing starting pitcher Floyd Bannister to the Chicago White Sox in free agency. Tartabull is selected from a pool of players provided by teams, such as Cincinnati, who have "opted in" to pursuing free-agent talent.
- January 26:
  - Chicago's cross-town rivals make a deal: the Cubs trade shortstop Scott Fletcher, pitchers Randy Martz and Dick Tidrow, and first baseman Pat Tabler to the White Sox in exchange for pitchers Steve Trout and Warren Brusstar.
  - The White Sox, who lost Type A free-agent outfielder Steve Kemp to the New York Yankees last December 9, select St. Louis Cardinals pitcher Steve Mura as compensation. Six days earlier, the ChiSox had picked southpaw Rudy May from the Yankees out of the compensation pool, but May's selection was voided because the veteran left-hander has a no-trade provision in his contract.
- January 31 – The Philadelphia Phillies sign two veteran free-agents: first baseman and future Hall of Famer Tony Pérez, released by the Boston Red Sox on November 1, 1982; and outfielder Bill Robinson, who returns for a final season with the Phils after being granted free-agency last November 10.

=== February ===
- February 5 – The Kansas City Royals trade 19-year-old first-base prospect Cecil Fielder to the Toronto Blue Jays for 32-year old outfielder Leon Roberts, who will retire after two mediocre seasons in Kansas City. "Big Daddy" Fielder will go on to enjoy several MVP-caliber seasons during his 13-year tenure in the major leagues, having his best years (1990–1996) playing with the Detroit Tigers.
- February 7 – The San Francisco Giants sign outfielder Joel Youngblood, granted free agency from the Montreal Expos last November 10. On August 4, 1982, Youngblood made history as the only player in MLB history to get a hit for two different teams on the same day.
- February 9 – Mike Ferraro, 38, the first-year manager of the Cleveland Indians, undergoes successful surgery to remove his cancerous left kidney 12 days before spring training begins. He's able to take the Indians' helm for their first Cactus League exhibition game a month later.
- February 16 – The St. Louis Cardinals sign utility player Jamie Quirk, granted free agency from the Kansas City Royals the previous November.
- February 23 – The San Diego Padres sign free agent and reserve catcher Bruce Bochy, 27, who one month earlier had been released by the New York Mets.
- February 24 – Veteran free-agent outfielder John Lowenstein, enjoying the most productive period of his 13-year MLB career, remains a member of the Baltimore Orioles, signing a new, three-year $1 million contract. Lowenstein, 36, will bat .385 in the 1983 World Series and earn a championship ring.
- February 28 – Outfielder Jerry Turner, who appeared in over 600 games during his first eight big-league seasons (1974–1981) with the San Diego Padres, returns to San Diego as a free agent. He had spent 1982 with the Detroit Tigers.

=== March ===
- March 1 – The Philadelphia Phillies sign infielder Kiko Garcia, granted free agency from the Houston Astros last November 10.
- March 24:
  - The Detroit Tigers acquire outfielder Johnny Grubb from the Texas Rangers in exchange for pitcher Dave Tobik.
  - The New York Yankees release veteran first baseman/DH John Mayberry, 34, ending his 15-year MLB career after 255 home runs.
- March 25 – The Tigers release pitcher Kevin Saucier. He had gone 3–1 in 1982, but developed a case of the Yips, which prevented Saucier from making simple throws to the catcher or even the bases. Saucier will never again pitch in the major leagues.
- March 31 – The Seattle Mariners purchase the contract of 28-year-old first baseman Ken Phelps from the Montreal Expos. Phelps will establish himself as a major-leaguer in Seattle, slugging 105 homers before he's swapped to the New York Yankees in July 1988 in a one-sided exchange that nets the Mariners future All-Star Jay Buhner.

=== April ===
- April 5:
  - Tom Seaver pitches six scoreless innings in his return to the New York Mets in front of 46,687 fans at Shea Stadium. He does not, however, factor in the decision, as he's matched by Philadelphia Phillies ace Steve Carlton. The Mets break through for two runs in the seventh, to make Doug Sisk the winner of their season opener.
  - At Candlestick Park on Opening Day, hitters are in midseason form, as the San Diego Padres and San Francisco Giants combine for 33 hits and 29 runs. The Giants hit four homers to the Padres' one, but San Diego triumphs, 16–13.
- April 7 – Major League Baseball, ABC, and NBC agree to terms of a six-year television package worth in excess of $1.1 billion. The two networks will continue alternative coverage of the All-Star Game, the playoffs and the World Series through the 1989 season with each of the 26 clubs receiving $7 million per year in return. The last package gave each club $1.9 million per year.
- April 9 – Houston Astros knuckleballer Joe Niekro surrenders an unearned run on a passed ball in the first inning and the Pittsburgh Pirates' Larry McWilliams makes the tally stand up, hurling a two-hit shutout for a 1–0 Pittsburgh victory at the Astrodome. Niekro allows only three hits himself.
- April 13 – Philadelphia Phillies catcher Bo Díaz accomplishes something that only 11 other Major League players have in the 150-plus year history of the sport: a game-winning "Sayonara Slam" (a walk off grand-slam home run in the bottom of the ninth inning with two outs and his team trailing by three runs). With the New York Mets leading, 9–6, and the Phillies down to their last out, Díaz drives a 2–1 Neil Allen pitch out of Veterans Stadium to win the game, 10–9.
- April 15:
  - Against the Chicago White Sox at Comiskey Park, Milt Wilcox of the Detroit Tigers has his bid for a perfect game broken up with two outs in the ninth by a Jerry Hairston single. The hit is the only one Wilcox allows in defeating the White Sox 6–0. Wilcox was also bidding to pitch the first no-hitter by a Tiger since Jim Bunning in 1958. The perfect game would also have made the White Sox and Tigers the first teams to record perfect games against each other; the Tigers were on the losing end of Charlie Robertson's perfect game on April 30, 1922.
  - Steve Garvey returns to Dodger Stadium as a member of the San Diego Padres and earns cheers before 53,392 fans as he ties Billy Williams' National League record for most consecutive games (1,117). Garvey will break the record the following night, when, in his 1,118th straight game, he goes 2 for 4 in the Padres' 8–5 loss to the Los Angeles Dodgers.
- April 16 – The Montreal Expos' Charlie Lea one-hits the Houston Astros, taking a no-hitter into the bottom of the eighth with two out before pinch hitter and native Canadian Terry Puhl singles. Montreal's 2–0 win is the Astros' tenth loss in their first 11 games of 1983.

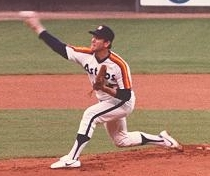
Nolan Ryan

- April 17:
  - At Fenway Park, the Texas Rangers and Boston Red Sox are locked in a scoreless tie until two out in the visitors' 14th inning, when an error by Boston shortstop Glenn Hoffman enables Larry Biittner to score the game's only run. Three Ranger pitchers combine for the shutout victory.
  - Nolan Ryan whiffs seven Expos in a 6–3 Houston win, becoming the second pitcher in MLB recorded history with 3,500 strikeouts.
- April 20 – Tom Seaver throws a complete-game, three-hit shutout, registers nine strikeouts, and hits an RBI triple in a vintage, 6–0 triumph for his New York Mets over the Pittsburgh Pirates in the opener of a twi-night doubleheader at Shea Stadium. It's the first victory in Seaver's homecoming season in New York, and lowers his ERA to 0.82.
- April 27 – Nolan Ryan strikes out Brad Mills of the Montreal Expos for the 3,509th strikeout of his career, breaking the long-time record established by Walter Johnson.
- April 29 – Frustrated by his 5–14 Chicago Cubs' late-game one-run loss at Wrigley Field—and incensed at the abuse of his players coming from spectators in the left-field bleachers as the Cubs exit the field—manager Lee Elia launches into a profanity-laced, three-minute-long tirade against Chicago fans during a postgame media interview. A tape recording of Elia's outburst made by a radio reporter spreads like wildfire, and the blowback almost costs Elia his job. He apologizes at a press conference soon after, and later says: "It was terrible. It was immature of me. But if you can get through the cursing, which I’m ashamed of, you'll see I was supporting my players. I just didn’t say it right."
- April 29–30 – A marathon night game between the San Francisco Giants and St. Louis Cardinals is suspended in the top of the 14th inning when, with the contest tied five-all, the arc lights fail at Busch Memorial Stadium. When the game resumes on April 30, the teams play into the bottom of the 16th, when the Cardinals score an unearned run for a 6–5 triumph.

=== May ===
- May 1 – Robin Yount hits his 100th career home run in the Milwaukee Brewers' 8–4 win over the Minnesota Twins at the Metrodome. The blow comes off Albert Williams. Yount, 27 and the incumbent American League MVP, is in his tenth season with the Brewers, but didn't discover his "power stroke" and reach double figures in home runs until 1980. He'll win a second MVP award in 1989 and finish with 3,142 hits and 251 homers before his Hall-of-Fame career ends in 1993.
- May 2 – José Oquendo makes his MLB debut with the New York Mets. Born on July 4, 1963, Oquendo is the first player in Mets' history to be younger than the franchise, which began play in 1962.
- May 6 – At Shea Stadium, Mets prospect Darryl Strawberry goes 0-for-4 with three strikeouts in his MLB debut. However, New York defeats the Cincinnati Reds 7–4 on George Foster's "walk-off" three-run homer in the 13th inning.
- May 9 – The Los Angeles Dodgers trade two pitching prospects, lefty John Franco and right-hander Brett Wise, to the Reds for infielder Rafael Landestoy. Franco, 22, is a future four-time NL All-Star.
- May 18 – At Memorial Stadium, starting pitcher Richard Dotson of the Chicago White Sox allows only one hit—but it's "Disco Danny" Ford's solo home run, and it provides the winning margin in the Baltimore Orioles' 1–0 triumph. Dotson walks seven over his eight-inning stint.
- May 22 – The Philadelphia Phillies, currently 18–14 and a half-game behind the St. Louis Cardinals in the NL East, make two key trades: they acquire southpaw relief pitcher Willie Hernández from the Chicago Cubs for starter Dick Ruthven and pitching prospect Bill Johnson; then, they obtain outfielder Joe Lefebvre from the San Diego Padres for hurler Sid Monge. Hernández gives the Phils eight wins and seven saves in 63 appearances over the regular season, and shuts down the Baltimore Orioles in a losing cause in the 1983 World Series. Lefebvre bats .310 with eight homers in 101 games to help the Phillies capture their division title.
- May 23 – Davey Lopes belts two solo homers off ex-teammate Don Sutton, including the tying blow in the ninth inning, sending his Oakland Athletics into extras tied, 4–4, with Sutton's Milwaukee Brewers. Then, in the home half of the 17th, Lopes bunts the winning run into scoring position as Oakland triumphs, 5–4.
- May 24 – The Kansas City Royals and visiting Texas Rangers are tied 2–2 when rain halts play after 5½ innings. When the game is cancelled the contest goes into the books as the American League's only tie game of 1983. Statistics will count, however.
- May 27:
  - Left-hander John Tudor allows only one hit, a fourth-inning single to Dave Collins, in the Boston Red Sox' 2–0 victory over the Toronto Blue Jays at Exhibition Stadium.
  - In the season's longest game so far, the St. Louis Cardinals tally twice in the visitors' half of the 18th inning to defeat the Houston Astros, 3–1. The Cardinals had been held scoreless since the second inning by four Houston pitchers.
- May 29 – Los Angeles Dodgers reliever Steve Howe checks himself into drug rehabilitation for cocaine addiction. The Dodgers fine him $54,000. He will return in June and Commissioner of Baseball Bowie Kuhn will place him on three years probation.

=== June ===
- June 2 – Saying "I've probably suffered enough," second-year New York Mets manager George Bamberger quits with his club 16–30, last in the NL East, and 10½ games out of the lead. First-base coach Frank Howard will take the helm for the remainder of 1983. Noted pitching guru Bamberger had compiled an 81–127 (.389) mark since Opening Day 1982 and failed to improve the mound staff's performance.
- June 6:
  - A day initially intended for the Boston Red Sox to honor their 1967 "Impossible Dream" pennant-winners and raise money to defray medical costs for disabled former star Tony Conigliaro ends in embarrassment and acrimony when the Red Sox' ownership group publicly ruptures. As media and fans arrive at Fenway Park for "Tony C Night" and a game against the Detroit Tigers, general partner Buddy LeRoux announces that, backed by a bloc consisting of holders of 16 of the club's 30 limited partnerships, he's taking over the team from the two other general partners, Jean R. Yawkey and Haywood Sullivan. Furthermore, LeRoux fires Sullivan as the Red Sox' general manager. Yawkey and Sullivan respond by filing suit against LeRoux. On the field, the 28–22 Red Sox bow, 11–6, the second setback in what will be a six-game losing streak. As the ownership battle enters the legal system, the takeover attempt is branded "the Coup LeRoux."
  - The distraction caused by their ownership feud obscures the news that the Red Sox today select University of Texas–Austin right-hander Roger Clemens in the first round (19th overall) in the 1983 MLB amateur draft. The future 354-game-winner will go 192–111 and win three Cy Young Awards and the 1986 American League Most Valuable Player Award in 13 seasons in a Boston uniform.
    - The Minnesota Twins, who possess the first picks in both the regular and secondary phases, are rebuffed by each selection (Tim Belcher and Oddibe McDowell), who refuse to sign with Calvin Griffith's low-paying franchise.
  - The Cleveland Indians trade outfielder Rick Manning and pitcher Rick Waits to the Milwaukee Brewers in exchange for pitchers Ernie Camacho and Jamie Easterly and outfielder Gorman Thomas.
- June 7 – The Kansas City Royals obtain left-hander Charlie Leibrandt from the Cincinnati Reds for fellow southpaw Bob Tufts. Currently pitching in Triple-A after a poor 1982 campaign with the Reds, Leibrandt, 26, will join the Royals' starting rotation in 1984 and win 17 regular-season games for their 1985 world championship team.
- June 9 – The New York Yankees release veteran pitcher Rick Reuschel. Recovering from shoulder surgery, Reuschel, 34, hasn't pitched in the majors since Game 6 of the 1981 World Series and is struggling with Triple-A Columbus. On June 28, he'll sign as a free agent with his original team, the Chicago Cubs, and continue his comeback in the Class A Midwest League. On September 11, 1983, Reuschel will return to the Wrigley Field mound as the starting pitcher and allow only one run in six innings against the St. Louis Cardinals.
- June 10:
  - At Shea Stadium, Dave Kingman's two-run, walk-off home run delivers a 17-inning, 4–2 victory for his New York Mets over the Montreal Expos.
  - The visiting Chicago White Sox and Oakland Athletics go almost as long, battling for almost 16 innings to a 1–1 deadlock before the A's push across the winning run in the home half of the 16th on an error committed by Chicago shortstop Jerry Dybzinski.

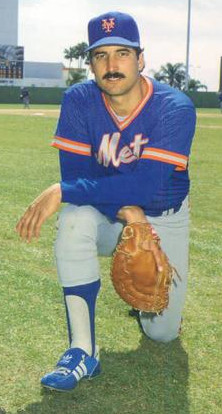
Keith Hernandez

- June 14 – The New York Mets trade right-hander Steve Senteney and outfielder Marvell Wynne to the Pittsburgh Pirates in exchange for 23-year-old catcher Junior Ortiz and minor-league pitcher Arthur Ray.
- June 15
  - In a more consequential transaction, the Mets acquire 1979 National League Co-MVP and two-time NL All-Star Keith Hernandez from the St. Louis Cardinals for pitchers Neil Allen and Rick Ownbey. First baseman Hernandez, 29, is in the prime of his career: he's in the process of winning the sixth of his 11 consecutive NL Gold Glove Awards (1978–1988); as a Met he will make three more All-Star squads, bat over .300 five times (including during the rest of 1983), and win his second World Series ring.
  - The Seattle Mariners and Chicago White Sox swap starting second basemen, with the Mariners dealing Julio Cruz for Tony Bernazard. Cruz, 28, will help spark the ChiSox to the 1983 American League West Division championship.
- June 20 – Former four-time All-Star outfielder Bobby Murcer, 37, is released by the New York Yankees, retiring after 17 MLB seasons in order to take a job as an analyst on the Yankees' broadcast team. Murcer appeared in nine games in 1983 as a designated hitter.
- June 23 – Right-hander Doyle Alexander, released by the Yankees on May 31, signs with the Toronto Blue Jays. Alexander, 32 and a 13-year MLB veteran, grossly underperformed during his second stint in the Bronx, posting a 1–9 (6.16 ERA) record in 24 games and 95 innings pitched during 1982–1983. He turns things around in Toronto—going 7–6 (3.93) for the rest of this season, then winning 17 games in both 1984 and 1985.
- June 24 – At County Stadium, Don Sutton of the Milwaukee Brewers records his 3,000th career strikeout during the eighth inning of a 6–2 victory; his victim is Cleveland Indians left-fielder Alan Bannister.
- June 25 – In last place in the AL West with the worst record (26–47, .356) in the major leagues, and losers of eight games in a row, the Seattle Mariners shake up their field leadership and playing roster. The Mariners replace manager Rene Lachemann, 38, with former standout MLB catcher Del Crandall, 53, whose Albuquerque Dukes are the three-time reigning Pacific Coast League champions. They also place veteran pitcher Gaylord Perry, 44, and shortstop Todd Cruz on waivers and recall rookie shortstop Spike Owen from their PCL affiliate, the Salt Lake City Gulls. Perry clears waivers and is released June 27; Cruz is claimed by the Baltimore Orioles on June 30.
- June 30 – New York Yankees owner George Steinbrenner shuffles his front-office deck once again. Murray Cook, 42, director of player development since January, is promoted to general manager, replacing Bill Bergesch, who remains with the Yankee front office with redefined responsibilities.

=== July ===
- July 4:
  - Left-handed pitcher Dave Righetti throws the New York Yankees' first no-hitter since Don Larsen's perfect game in the 1956 World Series, handcuffing the Boston Red Sox 4–0 before a holiday crowd of 41,077 at Yankee Stadium. It's the first no-hitter by a Bombers' southpaw since George Mogridge in 1917. Righetti fans future Hall-of-Fame hitter Wade Boggs for the final out.
  - As the July 4 weekend ends and the All-Star break begins, the midpoint of the 1983 season witnesses four tight races, with the two Canadian franchises holding first place in their divisions. In the AL East, the Toronto Blue Jays, 43–33 in Bobby Cox' second season as manager, hold a one-game lead over the Baltimore Orioles (42–34); the Detroit Tigers and the Yankees are nipping at their heels, two games behind. In the AL West, the Texas Rangers (44–34) lead the California Angels (42–36) by two and the Chicago White Sox (40–37) by 3½. The Montreal Expos (41–36) lead a closely bunched NL East by a game over the Philadelphia Phillies (38–36) and two over the defending world champion St. Louis Cardinals (40–39). In the NL West, the Atlanta Braves (49–31) and Los Angeles Dodgers (47–31) are battling for the top, with the Braves ahead by a single game.
- July 6:
  - In the 50th anniversary All-Star Game, played at its original venue, Chicago's Comiskey Park, the American League routs the National League 13–3 for its first win since 1971. The AL breaks the game open with seven runs in the fourth inning, highlighted by Fred Lynn's grand slam — the first ever in an All-Star competition. It is Lynn's fourth All-Star homer, tying him with Ted Williams for the AL record.
  - The 25-year, 898-game MLB career of left-hander Jim Kaat ends when he's released by the St. Louis Cardinals. Kaat, 44, won 283 games over that quarter-century, principally as a member of the Washington Senators/Minnesota Twins, and captured 16 Gold Glove Awards. He'll remain in baseball as a coach and broadcaster, and be elected to the Hall of Fame in 2022.
  - Another 44-year-old, future Hall of Famer, right-hander Gaylord Perry, changes address for the seventh and last time in his 22-year career when he's signed by the Kansas City Royals, nine days after being cut loose by the Seattle Mariners. He'll go 4–4 (4.27) in 14 starts for Kansas City—and play a bizarre role in the "Pine Tar Game" later this month—before retiring with 314 career wins in September.
- July 11 – The Cincinnati Reds, 36–49 and last in the NL West, fire embattled club president and general manager Dick Wagner. Wagner's highly successful predecessor, Bob Howsam, 65, in semi-retirement since February 1978, agrees to return to full-time service as interim chief executive officer and general manager.
- July 15 – Consecutive 0-for-3 days, yesterday against the Detroit Tigers and today against the Baltimore Orioles, drop Rod Carew's batting average to .397. The California Angels first baseman has finished every day over the .400 mark since April 21; his on-base percentage (.451) trails Wade Boggs by .001.

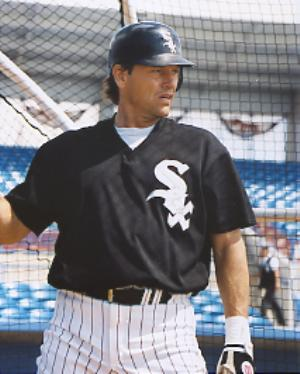
Carlton Fisk in 1993

- July 18
  - Philadelphia Phillies' general manager Paul Owens replaces Pat Corrales as manager—donning a uniform and taking over the team himself. The Phillies are a disappointing 43–42, but they're virtually tied for first place in the NL East with the 44–43 St. Louis Cardinals under second-year skipper Corrales. Says club president Bill Giles, who ordered the firing: "When you see ballplayers hitting 40 points below where they've been hitting, something is wrong. It's the job of the manager to motivate and get the players to play up to their capabilities." Owens will snap the Phillies out of their funk and lead them to the NL pennant.
  - Losing two one-run games, 4–3 and 5–4, the Texas Rangers drop a doubleheader to the Milwaukee Brewers at County Stadium; meanwhile the Chicago White Sox, led by Carlton Fisk's three hits, 15th homer, and four RBI, and LaMarr Hoyt's 11th victory of the year, defeat the Cleveland Indians, 5–3, at Municipal Stadium. With the victory, the White Sox leapfrog the Rangers, take first place in the AL West, and kick off a 53–21 (.716) hot streak that propels them to the division championship.
- July 24 – At Yankee Stadium, in what's soon famous as the "Pine Tar Game," George Brett of the Kansas City Royals hits an apparent, go-ahead two-run home run off Goose Gossage in the ninth inning against the New York Yankees. However, New York manager Billy Martin challenges that Brett's bat has more than the 18 inches (460 mm) of pine tar allowed, and home plate umpire Tim McClelland upholds Martin's challenge, nullifies the homer, and calls Brett out—seemingly ending the game in a 4–3 Yankee triumph. A furious Brett charges out of the dugout and confronts McClelland; he's ejected, along with his manager, Dick Howser. On July 28, AL president Lee MacPhail's office upholds Kansas City's protest, restoring the home run, and the game will be completed on August 18.
- July 29:
  - Steve Garvey, first baseman for the San Diego Padres dislocates his thumb, ending his streak of 1,207 consecutive games played. It is still the National League record for consecutive games played.
  - The Philadelphia Phillies purchase the contract of right-handed pitcher Larry Andersen from the Seattle Mariners. Andersen, 30, becomes an effective middle reliever/set-up man in the National League known for his playful demeanor and, eventually, a longtime and popular member of the Phillies' broadcast team.
- July 30 – The Cleveland Indians, 40–60 and last in the AL East, dismiss first-year manager Mike Ferraro and replace him with Pat Corrales, fired July 18 as skipper of the Phillies. Says Ferraro, who survived kidney cancer earlier in 1983: "I feel like I was shot in the back."
- July 31 – The 39–63 New York Mets have their day in the sun, winning a double-header, 7–6 and 1–0, at Shea Stadium over the first-place, 54–47 Pittsburgh Pirates—but they have to work overtime to do it. Each contest is won in the bottom half of the 12th inning. Lefty reliever Jesse Orosco wins both games. In the nightcap, Mike Torrez goes 11 shutout innings but leaves without a decision.

=== August ===
- August 2 – At Exhibition Stadium, the New York Yankees blast eight home runs in a doubleheader, but lose both contests to the Toronto Blue Jays, 10–9 and 13–6.
- August 3 – Nolan Ryan of the Houston Astros—who will author a record seven no-hitters over a 27-year MLB pitching career—fires what will be the ninth of his 12 career one-hitters. Today's effort comes in a home game against the San Diego Padres, with Tim Flannery's third-inning single the spoiling blow.
- August 5 – The Kansas City Royals release pitcher Vida Blue. The 1971 Cy Young Award winner and American League MVP is 0–5, (6.01) in 14 starts this season. He will become embroiled in a team-wide drug abuse scandal in October when he and three former Royals teammates are charged with possessing, or attempting to possess, cocaine.
- August 6 – Royals starter Eric Rasmussen tosses a 4–0 shutout against the Boston Red Sox in his first ever start in the American League. Having already shut out the San Diego Padres in his major league debut for the St. Louis Cardinals on July 21, 1975, Rasmussen becomes the only major league pitcher to ever pitch a shutout in his first National League start and his first American League start.
- August 10 – The Houston Astros acquire Jerry Mumphrey from the New York Yankees for fellow outfielder Omar Moreno. Mumphrey, 30, bats .336 for the remainder of 1983 and is selected to the 1984 NL All-Star team.
- August 13
  - Commissioner of Baseball Bowie Kuhn, whose second, seven-year term expires today, agrees to remain in office on an interim basis until December 31 or until a new commissioner is elected. Kuhn was denied a contract extension by MLB owners last November 1. Bud Selig, owner of the Milwaukee Brewers, is appointed to chair an eight-member search committee.
  - The Philadelphia Phillies cut ties with disappointing pitcher Ed Farmer, who has gone 2–12 (5.12) in 64 games since he rejoined them last season as a free agent; he's 0–6 (5.35) in 1983 alone. Farmer will sign with the Oakland Athletics on August 23, where he finishes his MLB mound career in October. In 1991, he begins a 29-year tenure as a broadcaster for the Chicago White Sox.
- August 17 – Manny Trillo is traded by the Cleveland Indians to the Montreal Expos in exchange for minor league outfielder Don Carter and $350,000 in cash. Trillo started at second base for the American League in July's All-Star game.
- August 18 – The infamous "Pine Tar Game" of July 24 concludes at 6 p.m. at a near-empty Yankee Stadium. The run-up is marked by legal challenges, with a New York Supreme Court justice reversing an injunction that would have barred the event less than 2½ hours before game time. When the ninth inning resumes, Yankee manager Billy Martin shows his contempt for the proceedings by stationing Don Mattingly, who throws left-handed, at second base and pitcher Ron Guidry in centerfield. He also tells his pitcher, George Frazier, to throw to every base, as an appeal in case George Brett failed to touch them on July 24. Frazier retires the only hitter he faces, then Royals closer Dan Quisenberry sets down the Yankees in order, sealing a 5–4 Kansas City triumph.
- August 19 – Preparing for the stretch run, the Los Angeles Dodgers acquire left-handed starting pitcher Rick Honeycutt from the Texas Rangers for pitchers Dave Stewart and Ricky Wright ("PTBNL") and $200,000. Although Honeycutt doesn't contribute much to the 1983 Dodgers' eventual NL West title, the 2.42 earned run average in 1742/3 innings pitched he's left behind with the Rangers will be good enough to lead the American League.
- August 22 – Losers of 12 of 16, the Chicago Cubs drop second-year manager Lee Elia and name veteran baseball man Charlie Fox his interim replacement. Chicago (54–69) is fifth in the NL East, 10½ games behind the Philadelphia Phillies.
- August 24:
  - Against the Cincinnati Reds at Wrigley Field, the Cubs' Chuck Rainey has a no-hitter broken up with two out in the ninth on an Eddie Milner single. The hit is the only one Rainey allows in defeating the Reds, 3–0. A no-hitter would have been the first by a Cub since Milt Pappas in 1972.
  - Don Sutton (nine innings) and Jim Slaton (five) combine on a 14-inning, 1–0 Milwaukee Brewers white-washing against the California Angels at County Stadium. Robin Yount collects the game-winning RBI. The Angels collect ten hits and the two teams strand a total of 29 baserunners.
- August 26 – The New York Yankees, only three games out in the AL East race, acquire right-hander John Montefusco from the San Diego Padres for two players to be named later (pitcher Dennis Rasmussen and infielder Edwin Rodríguez) and $200,000. Montefusco has become the Padres' closer after being banished to the bullpen by manager Dick Williams, but as a Yankee he will return to the rotation and go 5–0 (3.32) in six starts.
- August 28 – The Atlanta Braves, now only a half-game ahead of the Los Angeles Dodgers in the NL West, acquire right-handed starting pitcher and perfect game-author Len Barker from the Cleveland Indians for three players to be named later: pitcher Rick Behenna (added to the deal September 2) and third baseman Brook Jacoby and the Braves' starting center-fielder, Brett Butler, who are sent to Cleveland after their regular season ends.
- August 31 – At Veterans Stadium, the Philadelphia Phillies—in the thick of a tight NL East race—conclude a five-game series with the San Diego Padres by winning the rubber game, 4–3, and then acquiring the Padres' starting right-fielder, Sixto Lezcano, in a six-player mega-deal that includes five players to be named later. In addition to Lezcano, 29, the Phils get pitcher Steve Fireovid (PTBNL), and send four PTBNLs to San Diego in exchange: pitchers Darren Burroughs, Marty Decker, Lance McCullers and Ed Wojna.

=== September ===
- September 5:
  - The start of the stretch drive sees torrid races in each National League division. In the East, four of the six teams are all but tied for the lead: the Montreal Expos (69–66) and Pittsburgh Pirates (70–67) are virtually tied, and the Philadelphia Phillies and St. Louis Cardinals, both 69–67, are a half game back. In the West, the 79–58 Los Angeles Dodgers have moved 1½ games ahead of the 78–60 Atlanta Braves, after gaining eight games on the Braves during August.
  - In the American League, the Baltimore Orioles (80–54) continue to gain momentum, building a four-game margin over the Milwaukee Brewers (77–59) in the East, while the Chicago White Sox (78–59) have widened their lead in the West to 13 full games over the Kansas City Royals. Tony LaRussa's White Sox are the only team over .500 in their division.
- September 9 – Left-hander Britt Burns of the Chicago White Sox one-hits the visiting California Angels in an 11–0 ChiSox rout. Chicago raps out 17 hits, while Mike Brown's seventh-inning single is the Angels' only safety and the Halos commit five errors.
- September 13 – Dan Quisenberry, the Kansas City Royals' All-Star relief pitcher, saves his 39th game of the season—breaking John Hiller's MLB record by recording the final two outs in a 4–3 victory over the California Angels. He'll finish 1983 with 45 saves and place second in the AL Cy Young Award balloting.
- September 17 – The Chicago White Sox defeat the Seattle Mariners 4–3 at Comiskey Park, clinching the AL West division title. The victory secures their first postseason berth since 1959, only their second since the infamous 1919 season, and the last the team will celebrate at the 73-year-old ball-yard.
- September 19 – The Los Angeles Dodgers' Steve Howe misses a team flight to Atlanta and refuses a drug test. Commissioner Bowie Kuhn convenes an investigation and it is revealed that Howe was being treated by a doctor but not in drug rehab. Howe sits out the remainder of the season.
- September 20 – In the first inning of a 14–1 rain-shortened five-inning victory over the Baltimore Orioles, the Detroit Tigers stroke 10 consecutive hits and score 11 runs. Detroit's opening offense ties the American League record for runs scored to start the game, which was established by the Boston Americans in 1901.
- September 23 – At Busch Memorial Stadium, Steve Carlton of the Philadelphia Phillies records his 300th career win: a 6–2 defeat of the St. Louis Cardinals, the team that first signed him.
- September 25 – Storm Davis and Tippy Martinez limit the Milwaukee Brewers to six hits and one unearned run and Jim Dwyer and Joe Nolan go deep, powering the Baltimore Orioles to their seventh AL East title in 15 seasons with a 5–1 triumph at County Stadium. The Birds will face the Chicago White Sox in the 1983 ALCS.
- September 26 – Bob Forsch of the St. Louis Cardinals no-hits the Montreal Expos 3–0 at Busch Memorial Stadium. The no-hitter is the second of his career; he pitches his first in 1978.
- September 27:
  - Tim Raines becomes the first player since Ty Cobb in 1915 to steal 70 bases and drive in 70 runs in the same season.
  - Jim Campbell, 59, general manager of the Detroit Tigers since September 1962, turns over those responsibilities to his top lieutenant, vice president/baseball and former director of scouting Bill Lajoie, 49. Campbell remains club president. The Tigers are on the verge of a pennant and World Series championship.
- September 28:
  - At Wrigley Field, the Philadelphia Phillies clinch the National League East championship with the 7,000th win in their history, 13–6, over the Chicago Cubs. Mike Schmidt slugs his 40th home run, and Bo Díaz belts two. The Phillies are concluding a dominating stretch run in which they win 21 of their 26 games (.808) from Labor Day to the end of the regular season.
  - At San Diego, the Los Angeles Dodgers and Padres are locked in a 12-inning, 4–4 stalemate when—in a rarity for Southern California—the game is halted by rain. The tie game, only the second in the National League in 1983, nevertheless results in an NL West championship for the Dodgers when the second-place Atlanta Braves are mathematically eliminated by splitting a doubleheader with the Houston Astros. The Phillies and Dodgers will reprise their classic 1977 and 1978 postseason battles in the 1983 National League Championship Series.

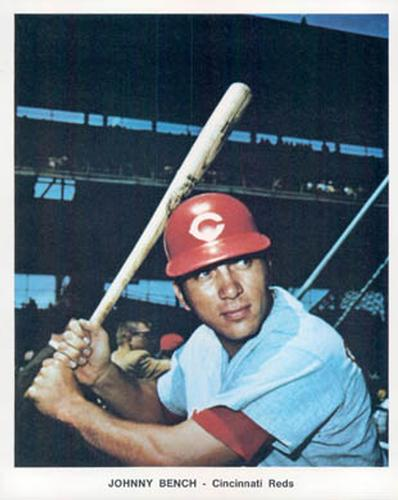
Johnny Bench

- September 29:
  - Rookie Mike Warren of the Oakland Athletics no-hits the Chicago White Sox 3–0 at Oakland–Alameda County Coliseum.
  - At Riverfront Stadium, Hall of Famer Johnny Bench appears in his last MLB game, the 2,158th of his career, all with the Cincinnati Reds. The 17-year veteran, pinch hitting for Ted Power in the fifth inning, lashes a two-RBI single for a key blow in a five-run Reds rally, then departs for a pinch runner. Twelve days earlier, at "Johnny Bench Day", the 14-time NL All-Star, perhaps "the greatest catcher who ever played the game," had started a game behind the plate for the last time in his career; he slugged his 327th home run as a catcher, then an MLB record, and the 389th of his career.

=== October ===
- October 1 – As he appears in his 3,307th and next-to-last game as a member of the Boston Red Sox, Carl Yastrzemski is feted with "Yaz Day" at Fenway Park. During the ceremony, the 44-year-old future Hall of Famer laps the entire field to thank the cheering fans for their support. Tomorrow, his final game, Yastrzemski will start the contest in his famous left-field position, then he takes another lap around the field to again express his appreciation.
- October 2 – Spoofing the weekend of accolades lavished on Yastrzemski, the Boston phone-in radio show The Sports Huddle airs a satirical tribute to Vern Rapp, a Montreal Expos coach and former manager (1977–1978) of the St. Louis Cardinals who also retired today after a lengthy baseball career, most of it in the minor leagues. The radio hosts interview Rapp, Cardinals broadcaster Mike Shannon, and Cincinnati Reds farm system director Sheldon "Chief" Bender as part of the tongue-in-cheek "tribute." But the intended parody has unexpected consequences: at a front-office meeting the following day, Bender suggests Rapp to Cincinnati club president Bob Howsam as a candidate for the Reds' 1984 managerial job—and his retirement is postponed when Rapp, 55, is hired on October 4 to succeed Russ Nixon at the Cincinnati helm. Says Bender: "Vern wasn't a candidate for the job until the [Boston] station called."
- October 3 – The Milwaukee Brewers fire manager Harvey Kuenn only a year after he led "Harvey's Wallbangers" to the World Series. The 1983 Brewers held first place in the AL East as late as August 25, but a disastrous 6–18 stretch through September 19 plunged them all the way to fifth place, 14 games behind the Baltimore Orioles. Kuenn will be replaced by Rene Lachemann, fired as skipper of the Seattle Mariners on June 25.
- October 4 – Two future Hall of Famers, Steve Carlton and Mike Schmidt, are the difference-makers as the Philadelphia Phillies defeat the Los Angeles Dodgers, 1–0, in Game 1 of the 1983 NLCS at Dodger Stadium. Schmidt homers off Jerry Reuss with two out in the opening frame, and Carlton tosses 72/3 innings of seven-hit, shutout ball before relief ace Al Holland slams the door on an eighth-inning Los Angeles rally and closes it out.
- October 6 – In the second game of the 1983 American League Championship Series, Oriole hurler Mike Boddicker throws a five-hitter to defeat the Chicago White Sox at Memorial Stadium, 4–0. Boddicker's performance evens the series, and he establishes a new LCS record by striking out 14 batters.
- October 7:
  - Phil Niekro, winner of 268 games in a Milwaukee/Atlanta Braves uniform, is unconditionally released. The 44-year-old knuckleballer and future Hall of Famer will win 50 more MLB games in the next four seasons.
  - The Chicago Cubs fill their managerial vacancy by hiring Jim Frey, 52, to replace acting skipper Charlie Fox. In 1980, Frey led the Kansas City Royals to the American League pennant, but was fired the following August after posting a cumulative record of 127–105 (.547). Frey also spent a decade on Earl Weaver's coaching staff in Baltimore (1970–1979) and was the Mets' hitting coach in 1982–1983.
- October 8 – In front of 64,494 fans at Veterans Stadium, the Philadelphia Phillies defeat the Los Angeles Dodgers, 7–2, to win the 1983 NLCS, three games to one. In today's Game 4, the Phils are sparked by the pitching of Steve Carlton and the power of Gary Matthews and Sixto Lezcano, who both hit homers. The Phillies make the World Series for only the fourth time in their 101-year-long franchise history.
- October 11 – John Fetzer, 82, sells the Detroit Tigers to pizza tycoon Tom Monaghan, 46. The purchase price is not disclosed, but the franchise's value is estimated at between $25 million and $35 million. Fetzer, who owns television and radio stations in Michigan, first invested in the Tigers in 1956 and has been sole owner since the death of business partner Fred Knorr in December 1960.
- October 13 – The New York Mets hire Davey Johnson, 40, as their 1984 manager. The former four-time Gold Glove Award-winning and 3x AL All-Star second baseman is promoted from Triple-A Tidewater, where he managed prospects like Darryl Strawberry, Ron Darling and Walt Terrell and won a Governors' Cup. Johnson succeeds interim manager Frank Howard. This past season, the Mets finished 68–94, sixth and last in the NL East.
- October 16:
  - Eddie Murray slams a pair of home runs and Scott McGregor pitches a five-hitter as the Baltimore Orioles beat the Philadelphia Phillies 5–0 and win the 1983 World Series in Game 5. Baltimore catcher Rick Dempsey, who hits .385 with four doubles and a home run, is named the Series MVP.
  - Dan O'Brien Sr. resigns as president and general manager of the Seattle Mariners. Chuck Armstrong succeeds him in the former job, and farm system director Hal Keller assumes GM duties.
- October 18 – Free-agent pitcher and six-time All-Star Vida Blue pleads guilty in a Kansas City federal court to possession of 3g of cocaine. He will be sentenced at a November 17 hearing, along with former Kansas City Royals teammates Willie Aikens, Willie Wilson and Jerry Martin, who earlier this month pled guilty to attempting to possess cocaine.
- October 19 – In the wake of their World Series defeat, the Philadelphia Phillies unconditionally release first baseman Pete Rose, 42. Twelve days later, they also will release second baseman Joe Morgan, 40.
- October 30 – Boston Red Sox farmhands John Mitchell, Anthony Latham and Scott Skripko are deep-sea fishing off the Gulf Coast of Florida when their boat capsizes. Boat owner Mark Zastrowmy and Latham drown. Skripko and Mitchell survive over 20 hours in the water by clinging to debris; Skripko holds onto a cooler for 20 hours and Mitchell a bucket for 22 hours. The Red Sox will memorialize 21-year-old outfielder Latham by presenting the "Tony Latham Award" to the most enthusiastic player in their Florida Instructional League program.

=== November ===
- November 2 – John Denny tallies 20 of the 24 writers' first-place votes to win the National League Cy Young Award, easily out-distancing runners-up Mario Soto and Jesse Orosco. The Prescott, Arizona, native posted a 19–6 record and a 2.37 ERA for pennant-winning Philadelphia Phillies. LaMarr Hoyt, a 24-game winner for the Chicago White Sox, will capture the "Cy" in the American League.
- November 3 – Starting pitcher Larry Christenson, the Phillies' first-round draft pick (third overall) in 1972, draws his unconditional release. Christenson, 29, spent his entire pro career with the Phils, going 83–71 (3.79) in 243 MLB games.
- November 7 – The free-agent "Class of 1983" grows by 44 players when they're granted freedom after playing out their existing contracts. The names include four future inductees to the Hall of Fame: first baseman Rod Carew, pitcher Goose Gossage, catcher Ted Simmons and outfielder Dave Parker. Including "six-year free agents," between October 15 and December 21, 1983, 72 players will be given freedom to sign with the highest bidder.

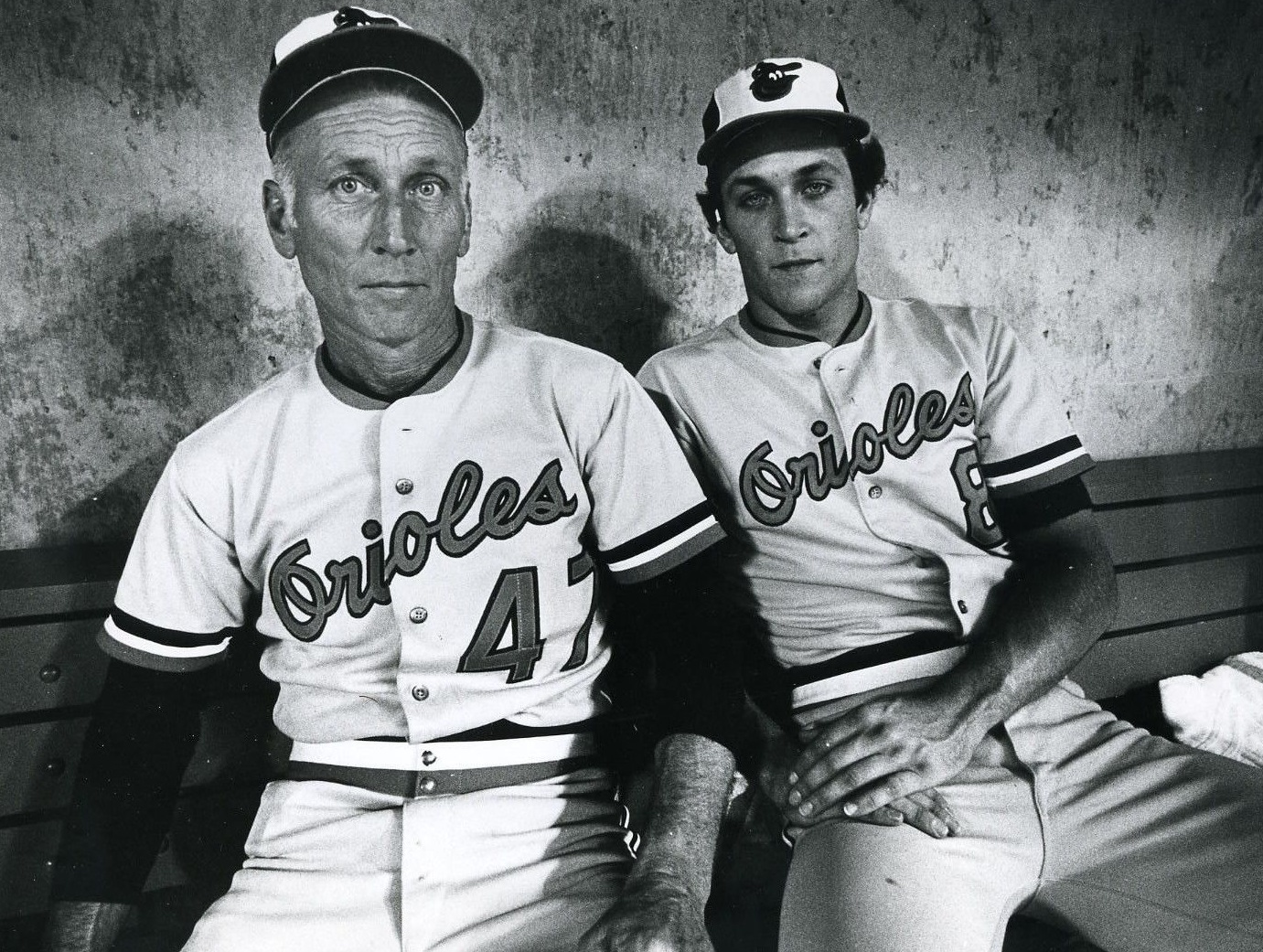
Cal Ripken Jr. with his father (#47) in 1982

- November 8:
  - Dale Murphy (.302, 36 homers and 121 RBIs) joins Ernie Banks, Joe Morgan and Mike Schmidt as one of the four players to win the National League Most Valuable Player in consecutive years. The soft-spoken Atlanta Braves outfielder receives 21 of the 24 votes (318 points) cast by the writers. André Dawson (one first-place vote and 213 points) is the runner-up.
  - Jesse Orosco, who placed third in the NL Cy Young Award race, receives four down-ballot NL MVP votes (14 points), ending a six-year drought in which not one player on the New York Mets received consideration of any kind for the award.
- November 14 – First baseman/outfielder Bruce Bochte, who sat out the 1983 season in retirement, signs with the Oakland Athletics as a free agent. Bochte, 33, batted .290 with 697 hits in 681 games for the 1978–1982 Seattle Mariners and was an AL All-Star in 1979.
- November 16 – Cal Ripken Jr. of the world-champion Baltimore Orioles is selected named American League MVP, edging teammate Eddie Murray. Ripken gets 15 first-place votes and 322 points, while Murray garners 290 points and ten first-place nods. Carlton Fisk gets the remaining three top-of-the-ballot votes.
- November 17 – Three current Kansas City Royals players (Willie Wilson, Willie Aikens, Jerry Martin) and former Royal Vida Blue are convicted of attempting to purchase cocaine, and sentence to short prison terms. It is a foreshadowing of the coming drug scandal that rocks the sport world throughout the 1980s.
- November 21:
  - Darryl Strawberry of the New York Mets is named the National League Rookie of the Year. In 1983, he hit 26 home runs, stole 19 bases, and had 74 RBIs while hitting .257.
  - The Oakland Athletics acquire pitchers Darrel Akerfelds and Bill Caudill from the Seattle Mariners for pitcher Dave Beard and catcher Bob Kearney. Relief ace Caudill will be selected an AL All-Star in 1984.
- November 22:
  - The MLB Players Association fires executive director Ken Moffett and chooses hard-liner Donald Fehr as his replacement. On the job for only 11 months after succeeding legendary retired MLBPA leader Marvin Miller, Moffett is reported to have run afoul of Miller and union official Mark Belanger, the former shortstop, over whether the MLBPA should cooperate with MLB owners on a joint policy regarding players' abuse of alcohol and recreational drugs. Miller and Belanger strongly oppose union involvement in any program that might discipline players or expose them to criminal liability.
  - Rod Carew returns to the California Angels after 15 days on the free-agent market. The first baseman batted .339 in 129 games in 1983, and made his 17th consecutive American League All-Star team.
  - Ron Kittle of the Chicago White Sox, who hit 35 home runs and amassed 100 RBIs in 1983, wins the American League Rookie of the Year Award, beating out Cleveland infielder Julio Franco and Baltimore pitcher Mike Boddicker.

=== December ===
- December 5:
  - The Toronto Blue Jays select third baseman Kelly Gruber, a future two-time All-Star, from the Cleveland Indians in the Rule 5 draft.
  - The National League champion Philadelphia Phillies trade relief pitcher Ron Reed, 41, to the Chicago White Sox for a player to be named later; another veteran, 40-year-old southpaw Jerry Koosman, will be sent to Philadelphia to complete the deal in February 1984.

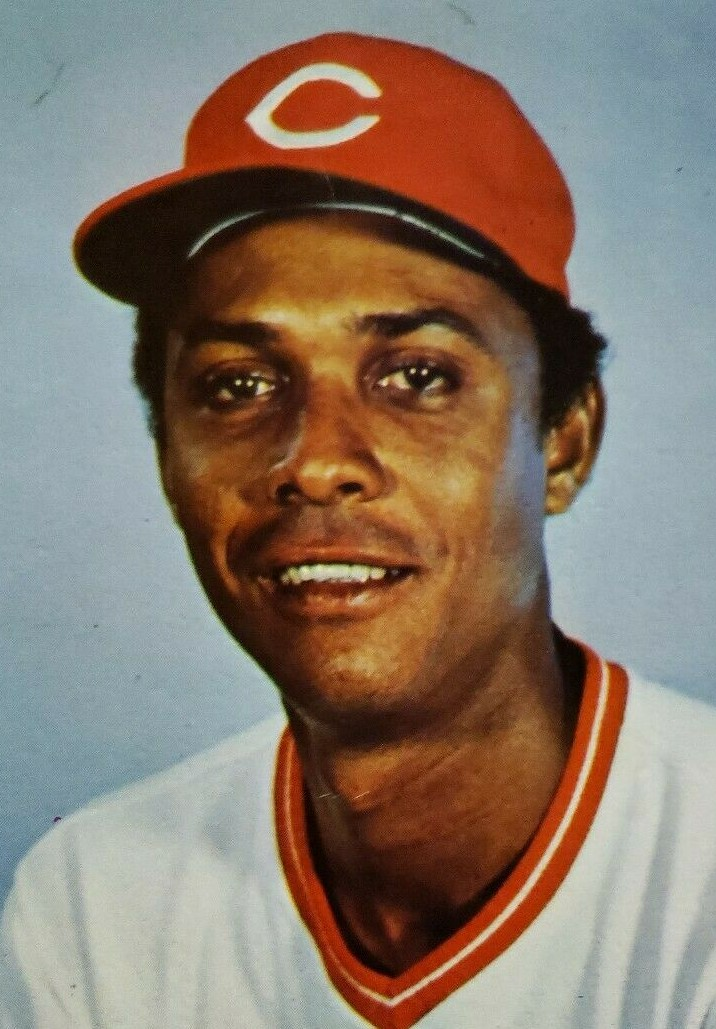
Tony Pérez

- December 6:
  - The Pittsburgh Pirates acquire left-handed starting pitcher John Tudor from the Boston Red Sox for outfielder Mike Easler. Nicknamed the "Hit Man," Easler will become a designated hitter in the American League.
  - "Big Red Machine" icon Tony Pérez returns to Cincinnati after a seven-year absence when his contract is purchased from the Phillies. First baseman Pérez, now 41 and a future Hall of Famer, bashed 277 homers and was a seven-time All-Star during his earlier, 13-year tenure (1964–1976) with the Reds.
- December 7:
  - The Reds sign outfielder, 1978 National League MVP and former local high-school star Dave Parker, granted free agency from the Pittsburgh Pirates on November 7. Parker, who grew up near Cincinnati's old ballpark, Crosley Field, will give the Reds four productive seasons, leading the NL in RBI in 1985 and making two All-Star teams, and gain admission to the Baseball Hall of Fame in 2025.
  - The Texas Rangers obtain 1983 AL All-Star outfielder Gary Ward from the Minnesota Twins for pitchers John Butcher and Mike Smithson and catcher Sam Sorce.
  - The Chicago Cubs, San Diego Padres and Montreal Expos pull off a six-player trade, in which the Cubs obtain pitcher Scott Sanderson from the Expos; San Diego gets pitcher Craig Lefferts, infielder Fritzie Connally and outfielder Carmelo Martínez from the Cubs, and infielder Al Newman from the Expos; and Montreal receives pitcher Gary Lucas from the Padres.
  - The Expos deal another pitcher, 33-year-old right-hander Ray Burris, to the Oakland Athletics for outfielder Rusty McNealy and cash.
  - The Seattle Mariners send second baseman Tony Bernazard to the Cleveland Indians for second baseman Jack Perconte and outfielder Gorman Thomas.
- December 8:
  - The New York Mets obtain 21-year-old left-hander Sid Fernandez and infielder Ross Jones from the Los Angeles Dodgers for right-hander Carlos Diaz and infielder Bob Bailor. Future two-time All-Star Fernandez and Diaz are both natives of Hawaii.
  - The Milwaukee Brewers acquire six-time Gold Glove Award-winning catcher Jim Sundberg from the Texas Rangers for catcher Ned Yost and minor-league hurler Daniel Scarpetta.
  - The Kansas City Royals make two trades. They receive first baseman Steve Balboni and pitcher Roger Erickson from the New York Yankees for pitcher Mike Armstrong and minor-league catcher Duane Dewey. Then, they acquire relief pitcher Joe Beckwith from the Dodgers for three minor leaguers. "Bye-Bye" Balboni will slug 117 homers over the next four full seasons as a Royal.
  - Bobby Brown, former third baseman, cardiologist, and baseball executive, is appointed the sixth president of the American League, succeeding Lee MacPhail. Brown, 59, won four World Series rings as a member of the Yankees while studying medicine. MacPhail, 66, remains in baseball as chair of the MLB Player Relations Committee.
  - The Oakland Athletics trade infielder Wayne Gross to the Baltimore Orioles for pitcher Tim Stoddard.
  - The Seattle Mariners send left-hander Bryan Clark to the Toronto Blue Jays for outfielder Barry Bonnell.
- December 13 – The Oakland Athletics sign free-agent second baseman Joe Morgan, released by the Philadelphia Phillies on October 31. First-ballot Hall of Famer Morgan, 40, will appear in 116 games for Oakland, 100 at second base, in his 22nd and final MLB campaign.
- December 16:
  - Commissioner Bowie Kuhn announces a one-year suspension from Major League Baseball for Steve Howe of the Dodgers and Willie Wilson, Willie Aikens, Vida Blue, and Jerry Martin of the Kansas City Royals for illegal purchase and use of cocaine.
  - Billy Martin's third term as manager of the New York Yankees manager ends with his firing after less than a calendar year, a 91–71 record, and second-place finish behind the Baltimore Orioles. Owner George Steinbrenner gives no specific reason for the change and keeps Martin under contract as a scout. Hall-of-Fame catcher and Yankee legend Yogi Berra, 58, is hired as Martin's replacement. It will be Berra's second turn as the Bombers' manager: he managed the 1964 edition to the American League pennant, but was fired after a seven-game loss in the World Series.
- December 17 – The Detroit Tigers sign third baseman Darrell Evans, 36, granted free agency from the San Francisco Giants on November 7.
- December 19:
  - Left-hander Dan Schatzeder returns to the Montreal Expos, re-signing with them after being granted free agency November 7.
  - Another member of November's free-agent class, Amos Otis, former five-time All-Star and 3x Gold-Glove centerfielder of the Kansas City Royals, signs with the Pittsburgh Pirates.
- December 20:
  - First baseman Willie Aikens, under a one-year suspension for attempting to possess cocaine, is traded by the Kansas City Royals to the Toronto Blue Jays for designated hitter Jorge Orta. After completing drug re-hab, Aikens will serve a three-month jail sentence beginning in January and is due to have his suspension reviewed by Bowie Kuhn in mid-May.
  - The Montreal Expos acquire pitching prospect Tim Burke from the New York Yankees for outfielder Pat Rooney and cash. Burke, who debuts in 1985, becomes an All-Star relief pitcher for Montreal; Rooney never appears for the Yankees.
  - The Milwaukee Brewers trade veteran right-hander Jim Slaton to the California Angels for outfielder Bobby Clark. Slaton, 33, won 14 games for the Brewers in 1983.
  - The San Francisco Giants sign November 7 free-agent Manny Trillo, most recently with the Montreal Expos. The Giants become Trillo's fourth team in a little more than a year. During Trillo's 88-game stint with the Cleveland Indians, he started for the American League in the 1983 All-Star Game.
  - November free-agent third baseman/outfielder Denny Walling opts to return to the Houston Astros.
- December 22 – Relief pitcher Kent Tekulve decides to remain with the Pittsburgh Pirates, signing a three-year deal worth $2.7 million. Tekulve, 36, had been granted free agency November 7.
- December 23 – The Detroit Tigers retain a veteran reliever of their own, agreeing to terms with right-hander Doug Bair, 34, whom they'd acquired from the St. Louis Cardinals in July, and who was subsequently granted free agency in November.
- December 29 – Starting pitcher Milt Wilcox, 33, also decides to remain with the Tigers. After being granted free agency in November, he signs a two-year contract to return to Sparky Anderson's Detroit staff. Wilcox will win 17 regular season games, and each of his starts in the 1984 ALCS and 1984 World Series—earning a championship ring.

== Movies ==
- Tiger Town (TV)

== Births ==
=== January ===
- January 2 – J. D. Martin
- January 7 – Edwin Encarnación
- January 9:
  - Brandon Boggs
  - Freddy Dolsi
- January 13 – Andrew Sisco
- January 16 – Eider Torres
- January 20:
  - Matt Albers
  - Geovany Soto
- January 22 – José Valdez
- January 26 – Ryan Rowland-Smith
- January 27:
  - Gavin Floyd
  - Mike Zagurski
- January 28 – Elizardo Ramírez

=== February ===
- February 1 – Dane De La Rosa
- February 2:
  - Ronny Cedeño
  - Jason Vargas
- February 4 – William Bergolla
- February 7 – Scott Feldman
- February 8:
  - Burke Badenhop
  - Chase Wright
  - Mauro Zárate
- February 13 – Mike Nickeas
- February 14 – Callix Crabbe
- February 15 – Russell Martin
- February 16 – Ramón Troncoso
- February 19 – Brad Kilby
- February 20:
  - José Morales
  - Justin Verlander
- February 21 – Franklin Gutiérrez
- February 22:
  - Brian Duensing
  - Carlos Fisher
  - Casey Kotchman
  - Arturo López
  - Daniel Nava
- February 23 – Édgar González
- February 25 – Jay Marshall
- February 26:
  - Joe Martinez
  - José Reyes
  - Francisco Rodríguez
- February 28:
  - Tug Hulett
  - Jeff Niemann
  - Trent Oeltjen

=== March ===
- March 1 – Blake Hawksworth
- March 2 – Glen Perkins
- March 3 – Brent Dlugach
- March 4 – Sergio Romo
- March 7:
  - Drew Macias
  - Taylor Tankersley
- March 8:
  - Chris Lambert
  - Mark Worrell
- March 9 – Willy Aybar
- March 10:
  - Donnie Murphy
  - Steven Shell
- March 16:
  - Stephen Drew
  - Brandon League
  - Rusty Ryal
- March 18:
  - Andy Sonnanstine
  - Craig Tatum
- March 24:
  - Chad Gaudin
  - Devon Lowery
- March 26 – Eric Hacker
- March 30 – Davis Romero
- March 31 – Jeff Mathis

=== April ===
- April 1:
  - John Axford
  - Will Rhymes
- April 6:
  - Thomas Diamond
  - Bronson Sardinha
- April 7 – Wes Whisler
- April 8:
  - Chris Iannetta
  - Eric Patterson
  - Bobby Wilson
- April 11 – Zack Segovia
- April 13:
  - Steve Pearce
  - Hunter Pence
- April 14:
  - Jeff Fiorentino
  - Adam Russell
- April 16 – Tommy Manzella
- April 18:
  - Miguel Cabrera
  - Alberto González
  - Mike Parisi
- April 19:
  - Alberto Callaspo
  - Zach Duke
  - Joe Mauer
  - Curtis Thigpen
- April 20 – Tommy Everidge
- April 23 – Fernando Pérez
- April 24 – Daniel Barone
- April 25:
  - J. P. Howell
  - Juan Miranda
  - Garrett Mock
- April 28 – David Freese

=== May ===
- May 4 – John Tumpane
- May 10 – George Kottaras
- May 12:
  - Jack Egbert
  - Blake Lalli
  - Evan Meek
- May 13:
  - Zach Jackson
  - Clay Timpner
- May 15 – Clint Sammons
- May 16 – Steven Register
- May 17:
  - Nobuhiro Matsuda
  - Jeremy Sowers
- May 20 – Adam Rosales
- May 21 – Kan Otake
- May 25 – Adam Hamari
- May 28:
  - Humberto Sánchez
  - Cory Wade
- May 30:
  - Jairo Asencio
  - Jae Kuk Ryu

=== June ===
- June 2 – Josh Geer
- June 4 – Cla Meredith
- June 5 – Bill Bray
- June 6 – Irving Falu
- June 7:
  - Mark Lowe
  - Doug Mathis
- June 9 – Danny Richar
- June 10:
  - Matt Chico
  - Radhames Liz
- June 11 – José Reyes
- June 17 – David Pauley
- June 18 – Jarrett Hoffpauir
- June 20 – Kendrys Morales
- June 27 – Jim Johnson
- June 29:
  - Pedro Viola
  - Mike Wilson
- June 30 – Drew Sutton

=== July ===
- July 2 – Samuel Deduno
- July 3 – Edinson Vólquez
- July 4 – Sergio Santos
- July 5 – Marco Estrada
- July 7:
  - Brandon McCarthy
  - Luke Montz
  - R. J. Swindle
- July 8 – John Bowker
- July 9:
  - Robert Manuel
  - Miguel Montero
- July 11 – Zach Clark
- July 12:
  - Howie Kendrick
  - Tony Sipp
- July 14 – Juan Gutiérrez
- July 17:
  - Steve Delabar
  - Adam Lind
- July 19:
  - Tim Dillard
  - Wilton López
- July 24 – Guilder Rodríguez
- July 31 – René Rivera

=== August ===
- August 2 – Huston Street
- August 3 – Mark Reynolds
- August 9 – Drew Butera
- August 13 – Dallas Braden
- August 14 – Juan Carlos Oviedo
- August 17:
  - Tuffy Gosewisch
  - Tyler Greene
  - Dustin Pedroia
- August 20 – Lance Broadway
- August 21:
  - Jesse Chavez
  - Jeff Clement
- August 24:
  - Brett Gardner
  - Alan Johnson
- August 27 – Billy Buckner
- August 29 – Anthony Recker
- August 30:
  - Mike Ekstrom
  - Chris Getz
- August 31 – Armando Gabino

=== September ===
- September 1 – José Constanza
- September 2 – Gaby Sánchez
- September 3 – Matt Capps
- September 5:
  - Jeff Stevens
  - Chris Young
- September 6 – Jerry Blevins
- September 8 – Nick Hundley
- September 9:
  - Mike Costanzo
  - Kyle Davies
  - Rhyne Hughes
  - Edwin Jackson
  - Alex Romero
- September 10:
  - Lance Pendleton
  - Joey Votto
- September 11 – Jacoby Ellsbury
- September 12 – Clayton Richard
- September 13 – Andy LaRoche
- September 14 – John Hester
- September 15 – Luke Hochevar
- September 16 – Brandon Moss
- September 18 – Brent Lillibridge
- September 19:
  - Joey Devine
  - Robinzon Díaz
  - Charlie Haeger
  - John Jaso
- September 20 – Ángel Sánchez
- September 24 – Travis Ishikawa
- September 25 – Miguel Pérez
- September 26 – Scott Lewis
- September 28 – Jay Buente

=== October ===
- October 4 – Kurt Suzuki
- October 5:
  - Alexi Ogando
  - Felipe Paulino
- October 6 – Radhames Liz
- October 7 – Ryan Rohlinger
- October 8 – Antoan Richardson
- October 9 – Jason Pridie
- October 12 – Nolan Reimold
- October 13 – Chris Seddon
- October 14 – Alberto Arias
- October 17 – Mitch Talbot
- October 18 – Garrett Olson
- October 21:
  - Casey Fien
  - Zack Greinke
- October 21 – Andy Marte
- October 24 – Chris Colabello
- October 26 – Francisco Liriano
- October 27:
  - Brent Clevlen
  - Martín Prado
- October 28 – Esmailin Caridad
- October 29 – Dana Eveland
- October 31 – Luis Mendoza

=== November ===
- November 1 – Steve Tolleson
- November 5 – Juan Morillo
- November 6 – Justin Maxwell
- November 7 – Esmerling Vásquez
- November 8 – Chihiro Kaneko
- November 9 – Tony Barnette
- November 10:
  - Brian Dinkelman
  - Ryan Mattheus
- November 12 – Charlie Morton
- November 14:
  - Guillermo Moscoso
  - Clete Thomas
- November 15 – Craig Hansen
- November 17:
  - Ryan Braun
  - Trevor Crowe
  - Nick Markakis
  - Scott Moore
- November 18 – Travis Buck
- November 20 – Brock Peterson
- November 23 – Wes Bankston
- November 24 – José López
- November 26 – Matt Garza
- November 27 – Jason Berken
- November 28 – Carlos Villanueva
- November 29 – Craig Gentry

=== December ===
- December 10 – Brandon Jones
- December 16 – Tom Wilhelmsen
- December 18 – Jordan Brown
- December 21:
  - John Mayberry Jr.
  - Taylor Teagarden
- December 22:
  - Blake Davis
  - Greg Smith
- December 23 – Hanley Ramírez
- December 24 – Gregor Blanco
- December 26 – Yohan Pino
- December 27 – Cole Hamels

== Deaths ==
=== January ===
- January 8 – Dave Barnhill, 69, five-time All-Star pitcher who appeared for New York Cubans of the Negro National League between 1941 and 1948.
- January 9
  - Eddie Palmer, 89, third baseman and pinch hitter in 16 games for the 1917 Philadelphia Athletics.
  - Stan Spence, 67, four-time All-Star outfielder who played for the Boston Red Sox, Washington Senators and St. Louis Browns for nine seasons between 1940 and 1949.
- January 10 – Gil Torres, 67, Cuban shortstop and third baseman who played in 346 games for the Senators (1940 and 1944–1946).
- January 23
  - Cookie Cuccurullo, 64, left-handed pitcher who hurled in 62 total games for the wartime Pittsburgh Pirates (1943–1945).
  - Phil Piton, 80, president of the Minor League Baseball from 1964 through 1971.
- January 26
  - Chet Laabs, 70, All-Star outfielder for the St. Louis Browns who hit two home runs in 1944's final game to clinch the Browns' only American League pennant; his 11-season (1937–1947) career also included service with the Detroit Tigers and Philadelphia Athletics.
  - Del Rice, 60, catcher who appeared in 1,309 games over 17 MLB seasons (1945–1961) for five clubs, principally the St. Louis Cardinals and Milwaukee Braves; two-time (1946, 1957) World Series champion and 1953 All-Star; coach for Los Angeles/California Angels (1962–1966) who managed 1972 Angels to a 75–80 record.
- January 27 – Squire Potter, 80, Washington Senators hurler who, in his lone MLB game on August 7, 1923, allowed seven earned runs in a single inning pitched in a 22–2 thrashing from the Cleveland Indians at Griffith Stadium.
- January 28 – Joe Chamberlain, 72, infielder and pinch hitter who got into 41 games for the 1934 Chicago White Sox.
- January 31 – Sam Gibson, 83, pitcher who worked in 131 career games for the Detroit Tigers (1926–1928), New York Yankees (1930) and New York Giants (1932).

=== February ===
- February 3 – Trader Horne, 83, relief pitcher for the 1929 Chicago Cubs.
- February 6 – Mal Moss, 77, left-handed pitcher who worked in 12 games for 1930 Cubs.
- February 8 – Rufe Clarke, 82, pitcher who worked seven games, all in relief, for the 1923–1924 Detroit Tigers.
- February 9 – Jackie Hayes, 76, second baseman who played in 1,091 games in 14 seasons for the Washington Senators and Chicago White Sox from 1927 to 1940.
- February 12 – Bob Saunders, 81, pitcher for the Kansas City Monarchs and Detroit Stars of the Negro National League in 1926.
- February 16:
  - Melba Alspaugh, 58, All-American Girls Professional Baseball League outfielder.
  - Everett Fagan, 65, pitched who compiled a 2–7 won–lost record (5.47 ERA) in 38 games for the Philadelphia Athletics (1943, 1946).
- February 19 – Frank Colman, 64, outfielder who appeared in 271 career games for Pittsburgh Pirates (1942–1946) and New York Yankees (1946–1947); member of the Canadian Baseball Hall of Fame.
- February 26 – Ford Smith, 64, pitcher in 26 games (14–6, 2.29 ERA) and position player/pinch hitter in 33 more (.221 with 32 hits) for the Kansas City Monarchs of the Negro American League (1941, 1946–1948).

=== March ===
- March 3 – Jennings Poindexter, 72, pitcher for the Red Sox and Cardinals in the 1930s.
- March 4 – Kiddo Davis, 81, outfielder who appeared in 575 games over eight seasons (1926 and 1932–1938) for five clubs, principally the New York Giants and Philadelphia Phillies; batted .368 with seven hits, helping Giants win 1933 World Series.
- March 9 – Carl Manda, 96, second baseman/pinch-runner who appeared in nine games for 1914 Chicago White Sox.
- March 10 – Connie Desmond, 75, play-by-play broadcaster for the New York Yankees and Giants (1942) and Brooklyn Dodgers (1943–1956).
- March 12 – Bob Hall, 59, pitcher for the Boston Braves (1949–1950) and Pittsburgh Pirates (1953).
- March 13 – Bill Anderson, 87, southpaw relief pitcher who got into two games for the Boston Braves in September 1925.
- March 16 – Eudie Napier, 70, catcher for the Homestead Grays between 1939 and 1948, beginning as a backup to Josh Gibson before becoming a regular; member, 1948 Negro World Series champions.
- March 18 – Frank Oceak, 70, longtime minor-league infielder and manager who spent 11 years in MLB as a coach for the Pittsburgh Pirates (1958–1964 and 1970–1972) and Cincinnati Reds (1965); third-base coach of 1960 and 1971 World Series champions.
- March 20 – Ed Stone, 73, outfielder in the Negro Leagues who was known for his solid fielding and heavy bat.
- March 22 – Don Savidge, 74, Washington Senators pitcher who saw action in three contests in August 1929.
- March 24 – George Darrow, 79, left-hander who pitched in 17 games for the 1934 Philadelphia Phillies.
- March 30:
  - Joe Cicero, 72, shortstop who played for the 1929–1930 Boston Red Sox as a teenager, disappeared into the minor leagues for over a decade, then returned to the majors at age 34 for the 1945 Philadelphia Athletics during the World War II manpower shortage.
  - Ike Danning, 78, catcher who went three for six (.500) in a two-game trial for the St. Louis Browns in September 1928; older brother of Harry Danning.
  - Jack Roche, 92, who appeared in 59 games as a catcher and pinch hitter for the St. Louis Cardinals (1914–1915, 1917).

=== April ===
- April 1 – Calvin Chapman, 72, outfielder, second baseman and shortstop who appeared in 111 games for the 1934–1935 Cincinnati Reds.
- April 3 – Mickey Livingston, 68, catcher who played in 561 career games over ten seasons between 1938 and 1951 for six MLB clubs; batted .364 in 22 at bats with four RBI in a losing cause as a Chicago Cub during the 1945 World Series.
- April 9:
  - Jake Freeze, 82, pitcher who appeared in two July 1925 games for the White Sox.
  - Bill Kennedy, 62, southpaw pitcher for the Cleveland Indians, St. Louis Browns, Chicago White Sox, Boston Red Sox and Cincinnati Redlegs over eight seasons between from 1948 and 1957.
- April 10 – Chet Johnson, 65, left-handed pitcher who appeared in 586 games during an 18-year minor-league career, but only five contests for 1946 St. Louis Browns; brother of fellow southpaw pitcher Earl Johnson.
- April 11 – Mike Menosky, 88, outfielder for the Pittsburgh Rebels (of the "outlaw" Federal League), Washington Senators and Boston Red Sox between 1914 and 1923.
- April 12 – Carl Morton, 39, pitcher with the Montreal Expos (1969–1972) and Atlanta Braves (1973–1976); 1970 National League Rookie of the Year after winning 18 games for second-year Expos club; also had seasons of 15, 16 and 17 wins for Braves.
- April 15:
  - Bill Sarni, 55, catcher for the St. Louis Cardinals (1951–1952, 1954–1956) and New York Giants (1956) who appeared in 390 big-league games before suffering a heart attack at age 29 that ended his playing career.
  - Chuck Wilson, 54, right-fielder for the 1948 Indianapolis Clowns of the Negro American League.
- April 17 – Emil "Dutch" Leonard, 74, five-time All-Star pitcher who employed the knuckleball in earning 191 wins over 20 seasons between 1933 and 1953 with the Brooklyn Dodgers, Washington Senators, Philadelphia Phillies and Chicago Cubs; one of four flutter-ball artists who were regular starting pitchers for the 1945 Senators.
- April 18 – Woody Rich, 77, left-handed pitcher who worked in 33 career games for 1939–1941 Boston Red Sox and 1944 Boston Braves; won 249 games over 22 minor-league seasons.
- April 22 – Mike Schemer, 65, first baseman who played 32 games for 1945–1946 New York Giants.
- April 25 – Carlos Paula, 55, Cuban outfielder, first black player in Washington Senators history (September 6, 1954); batted .271 in 157 games over all or part of three seasons through June 1956.

=== May ===
- May 2:
  - Dewitt Owens, 82, shortstop/second baseman for the Cleveland Elites and Birmingham Black Barons of the Negro National League from 1926 to 1930.
  - Archie Yelle, 90, catcher who got into 87 games for the 1917–1919 Detroit Tigers.
- May 3 – Eugene Keeton, 86, pitcher who appeared for the Cleveland Tate Stars (1922) and Detroit Marcos (1926) of the Negro National League.
- May 6 – Nelson Greene, 83, southpaw pitcher who worked in 15 games for 1924–1925 Brooklyn Robins.
- May 13 – Lerton Pinto, 84, left-hander who pitched in 12 games for the 1922 and 1924 Philadelphia Phillies.
- May 16 – Mel Wright, 55, relief pitcher in 58 career games for St. Louis Cardinals (1954–1955) and Chicago Cubs (1960–1961), then a coach for five MLB clubs for 13 seasons between 1962 and 1983; member of Montreal Expos' staff at the time of his death.
- May 20 – Fred Schulte, 82, center fielder for St. Louis Browns, Washington Senators and Pittsburgh Pirates from 1927 to 1937 who batted .291 in 1,179 games.
- May 24 – Oscar Levis, 84, Jamaican-born pitcher for the Cuban Stars East of the Eastern Colored League (1923–1928); also played for the Hilldale Club and in the Cuban League.
- May 26 – Dutch Romberger, 56, who pitched for 13 pro seasons (1948–1959, 1961), all of them in the Athletics' organization, but spent only ten games in MLB on the staff of the 1954 A's during their final season in Philadelphia.
- May 30 – Harry Weaver, 91, pitcher who appeared in 19 games for the Philadelphia Athletics (1915–1916) and Chicago Cubs (1917–1919).

=== June ===
- June 2 – Chancelor Edwards, 82, catcher who appeared in ten games for the Cleveland Tigers of the Negro National League in 1928.
- June 10 – Jim Cronin, 77, infielder who appeared in 23 games for the 1929 World Series champion Philadelphia Athletics.
- June 11 – Dick Aylward, 58, catcher and 14-year minor league veteran who played in four MLB games in May 1953 for the Chicago Cubs.
- June 14 – Speed Martin, 89, pitcher who compiled a 29–42 won–lost mark and an ERA of 3.78 in 126 career games for the St. Louis Browns (1917) and Chicago Cubs (1918–1922)
- June 20 – Gil Britton, 91, shortstop who appeared in three games for the Pittsburgh Pirates in September 1913.
- June 21 – Kit Carson, 70, outfielder who played in 21 games for the 1934–1935 Cleveland Indians.
- June 23 – Jimmy Newberry, 64, pitcher in 41 games in the Negro American League between 1943 and 1948, and one of the first two African-Americans to play in Nippon Professional Baseball.
- June 26 – Don Rader, 89, a shortstop who appeared in nine career games as a member of the 1913 Chicago White Sox and 1921 Philadelphia Phillies.
- June 27:
  - Doc Carroll, 91, catcher and dentistry school graduate who played in ten games for the hapless 1916 Philadelphia Athletics.
  - Jesse Landrum, 70, second baseman who appeared in four games for the Chicago White Sox during the early weeks of the 1938 season; later, a longtime scout.

=== July ===
- July 7 – Vic Wertz, 58, All-Star right fielder and first baseman for five AL teams over 17 years (1947–1963) who had five 100-RBI seasons, but was best remembered for his long fly ball caught spectacularly by Willie Mays in Game 1 of the 1954 World Series.
- July 19:
  - Joe Beggs, 72, pitcher who led National League in saves in 1940 as standout reliever for the World Series champion Cincinnati Reds; also hurled for New York Yankees and New York Giants during his nine-year (1938, 1940–1944, 1946–1948) MLB career.
  - George Sweatt, 89, outfielder/infielder who played in 343 Negro National League games for the Kansas City Monarchs (1922–1925) and Chicago American Giants (1926–1927).
- July 20 – Chick Sorrells, 86, appeared in two games for the 1922 Cleveland Indians as a pinch hitter and shortstop.
- July 23 – Neil Robinson, 75, nine-time All-Star as a stalwart of the Memphis Red Sox of the Negro American League between 1938 and 1948, primarily playing as a center fielder.

=== August ===
- August 4 – Ed Wheeler, 68, infielder who appeared in 46 games for the Cleveland Indians during the wartime 1945 season.
- August 6:
  - Tip Tobin, 76, outfielder who played one game (with one at bat) for the New York Giants on September 22, 1932.
  - Jimmy Wasdell, 69, outfielder/first baseman who appeared in 888 games for five MLB teams over 11 seasons (1937–1947).
- August 13 – Charlie Gilbert, 64, outfielder for three NL clubs over six seasons (1940–1943 and 1946–1947); son and brother of big leaguers.
- August 16 – Earl Averill, 81, Hall of Fame center fielder for the Cleveland Indians who batted .318 lifetime and had five 100-RBI seasons; his line drive off Dizzy Dean's foot in the 1937 All-Star game led to the end of Dean's career; his son had a seven-year MLB career in 1950s and 1960s.
- August 29 – Francis "Steve" O'Neill, 83, Cleveland trucking industry magnate who was principal owner of the Indians from 1978 until his death; prior to that, a limited partner in George Steinbrenner's New York Yankees ownership group from 1973 to 1978.
- August 31 – Frank Mills, 88, catcher and pinch-hitter who appeared in four September 1914 games for Cleveland.

=== September ===
- September 5 – Sam Woods, right-hander who pitched in five games in the Negro American League during the 1946 and 1948 seasons.
- September 11 – Bill McCarren, 87, third baseman who appeared in 69 games for the 1923 Brooklyn Robins; longtime scout after his playing days.
- September 22 – John Fallings, 56, pitcher for the New York Black Yankees of the Negro National League (1947–1948).
- September 28 – Walter Thomas, 71, outfielder/pitcher who played in the Negro leagues between 1935 and 1946; brother of Orrel Thomas and great-uncle of Richie Martin.

=== October ===
- October 5 – George Turbeville, 69, left-hander who posted a 2–12 won–lost mark and an ERA of 6.14 in 62 career games for 1935–1937 Philadelphia Athletics.
- October 12 – Charlie Engle, 80, infielder who played in 87 games for the Philadelphia Athletics (1925–1926) and Pittsburgh Pirates (1930).
- October 13 – Cal Medley, southpaw for the 1946 New York Black Yankees of the Negro National League.
- October 18 – Willie "Puddin' Head" Jones, 58, "Whiz Kid" and All-Star third baseman for the Philadelphia Phillies (1947–1959), who led the National League in fielding percentage five times and in putouts seven times.
- October 23 – Buck Crouse, 86, lefty-swinging backup catcher who appeared in 470 games over eight years (1923–1930) with Chicago White Sox.
- October 26 – Frank Tabacchi, 73, American League umpire who worked 516 games between April 17, 1956, and June 21, 1959.
- October 28 – Ray Sanders, 66, first baseman for St. Louis Cardinals (1942–1945) and Boston Braves (1946 and 1948–1949); member of 1942 and 1944 world champion Redbirds, and 1943 and 1948 NL champs in St. Louis and Boston respectively.
- October 31 – George Halas, 88, outfielder who played in 12 games for the 1919 New York Yankees before becoming a legendary coach and owner of the Chicago Bears of the National Football League.

=== November ===
- November 1 – Art Ruble, 80, outfielder who appeared in 75 MLB games as a member of the 1927 Detroit Tigers and 1934 Philadelphia Phillies.
- November 2 – Hal Wiltse, 80, pitcher for the Boston Red Sox (1926–28), St. Louis Browns (1928) and Philadelphia Phillies (1931).
- November 4 – Clarence Pickrel, 72, pitcher who appeared in 19 total games for the 1933 Phillies and 1934 Boston Braves.
- November 5:
  - Lefty Taber, 83, who pitched in nine games for the Phillies in 1926–1927.
  - Pat Murray, 86, another southpaw who hurled for the Phillies; appeared in eight games in 1919.
- November 6 – Bob Lawrence, 83, pitcher who appeared in one game and pitched one inning as a member of the Chicago White Sox on July 19, 1924.
- November 15 – Charlie Grimm, known as "Jolly Cholly", 85, good-natured first baseman (1925–1936) and manager (all or parts of 14 years over three terms between 1932 and 1960) of the Chicago Cubs who batted .300 five times and led them to three National League pennants (1932, 1935, 1945); also played for Philadelphia Athletics, St. Louis Cardinals and Pittsburgh Pirates, and managed Boston/Milwaukee Braves; in addition, served Cubs as a coach, broadcaster and front-office executive; per Grimm's wishes, his ashes are scattered over Wrigley Field after his funeral service.
- November 16 – George Holcomb, 83, right-hander who hurled for the 1923 Detroit Stars of the Negro National League.
- November 18 – Hilton Smith, 76, pitcher for the Negro leagues' Kansas City Monarchs who was known for his outstanding curveball and was inducted into the Baseball Hall of Fame posthumously in 2001.
- November 22 – Dave Short, 66, outfielder who played seven games for Chicago White Sox in 1940 and 1941.
- November 24 – Ed Leip, 72, second baseman and pinch runner in 30 career games for the Washington Senators and Pittsburgh Pirates between 1939 and 1942.
- November 28 – Chet Boak, 48, who appeared in ten games as a pinch hitter and second baseman—five for the 1960 Kansas City Athletics and five for the 1961 expansion Washington Senators.
- November 30 – Bill Evans, 69, relief pitcher for the Chicago White Sox and Boston Red Sox between 1949 and 1951.

=== December ===
- December 2 – Mike Powers, 77, pinch hitter and right fielder for 1932–1933 Cleveland Indians, appearing in 38 total games.
- December 8 – George Handy, 63, second baseman for the Memphis Red Sox of the Negro American League in 1947 and 1948.
- December 9 – Goldie Cephus, 85, outfielder for four Neghro leagues teams between 1928 and 1934.
- December 12 – Jim Weaver, 80, known as "Big James", 6 ft 6 in (1.98 m) pitcher who appeared in 189 games over eight seasons for six MLB clubs, chiefly the Pirates, between 1928 and 1939; led NL in shutouts (4) in 1935.
- December 14 – Roy Hamey, 81, longtime executive; general manager of the Pittsburgh Pirates, Philadelphia Phillies and New York Yankees for 12 seasons between 1947 and 1963; won three pennants and two World Series titles in his three seasons (1961–1963) as head of the Yankees' front office.
- December 19 – Zip Collins, 91, outfielder who played 281 games for the Pirates (1914–1915), Boston Braves (1915–1917) and Philadelphia Athletics (1921).
- December 25 – Babe Young, 68, first baseman who appeared in 728 games for the New York Giants (1936, 1939–1942 and 1946–1947), Cincinnati Reds (1947–1948) and St. Louis Cardinals (1948); twice topped 100-RBI mark.
- December 26 – Sid Graves, 82, outfielder and Bowdoin College alumnus who appeared in seven games for the 1927 Boston Braves.
- December 29 – Bob Neal, 77, Cleveland play-by-play announcer who called Indians' games on radio or television for 18 seasons spanning 1952 to 1972.
