= Tabacchi =

Tabacchi is an Italian surname. Notable people with the surname include:

- Aaron Tabacchi (born 1998), Italian footballer
- Doménica Tabacchi (born 1973), Ecuadorian journalist and politician
- Frank Tabacchi (1910–1983), American baseball umpire
- Giovanni Tabacchi (1931–2018), Italian bobsledder
- Odoardo Tabacchi (1836–1905), Italian sculptor
