= George Holcomb =

American baseball player

- Pitcher
- Born: April 29, 1900; Elkhorn, West Virginia, US
- Died: November 16, 1983 (aged 83); Cleveland, Ohio, US
- Threw: Right

Negro league baseball debut
- 1923, for the Detroit Stars

Last appearance
- 1923, for the Detroit Stars

Teams
- Detroit Stars (1923)

George Edward Holcomb (April 29, 1900 – November 16, 1983) was an American Negro league pitcher in the 1920s.

A native of Elkhorn, West Virginia, Holcomb played for the Detroit Stars in 1923. He died in Cleveland, Ohio in 1983 at age 83.
