= Walter Thomas (baseball) =

American baseball player

- Pitcher
- Born: October 22, 1911; Doyle, Alabama, U.S.
- Died: September 28, 1983 (aged 71); Big Rapids, Michigan, U.S.
- Batted: Left Threw: Right

Negro league baseball debut
- 1935, for the Chicago American Giants

Last appearance
- 1947, for the Birmingham Black Barons

Teams
- Chicago American Giants (1935–1937); Detroit Stars (1937); Kansas City Monarchs (1944–1945); Chicago American Giants (1946); Birmingham Black Barons (1947)

Walter Lewis Thomas (October 22, 1911 – September 28, 1983), nicknamed "Bancy", was an American Negro league pitcher in the 1930s and 1940s.

A native of Doyle, Alabama, Thomas was the brother of fellow Negro leaguer Orrel Thomas. He made his Negro leagues debut in 1935 with the Chicago American Giants, and later played for the Detroit Stars, Kansas City Monarchs, and Birmingham Black Barons. Following his Negro league career, Thomas played for the Carman Cardinals of the Mandak League for several seasons in the early 1950s. He died in Big Rapids, Michigan in 1983 at age 71.

Thomas's grandson, Richie Martin, is a shortstop for the Baltimore Orioles.
