= George Handy (baseball) =

American baseball player

- Second baseman
- Born: December 26, 1919; Wilson County, North Carolina
- Died: October 20, 1983 (aged 63); Brentwood, New York
- Batted: Left Threw: Right

Negro league baseball debut
- 1947, for the Memphis Red Sox

Last appearance
- 1948, for the Memphis Red Sox
- Stats at Baseball Reference

Teams
- Memphis Red Sox (1947–1948)

George William Handy Jr. (December 26, 1919 – October 20, 1983) was an American Negro league second baseman in the 1940s.

A native of Wilson County, North Carolina, Handy attended Booker T. Washington High School. He made his Negro leagues debut in 1947 with the Memphis Red Sox, and played with Memphis again the following season. Handy played minor league baseball in the 1950 with such clubs as the Fort Lauderdale Lions, Norfolk Tars, and Winston-Salem Twins. He died in Brentwood, New York in 1983 at age 63.
