= Goldie Cephus =

American baseball player (1898–1983)

- Outfielder
- Born: October 16, 1898; Preston, Maryland, U.S.
- Died: December 9, 1983 (aged 85); Philadelphia, Pennsylvania, U.S.

Negro league baseball debut
- 1928, for the Cleveland Tigers

Last appearance
- 1934, for the Newark Dodgers
- Stats at Baseball Reference

Teams
- Cleveland Tigers (1928); Memphis Red Sox (1928); Bacharach Giants (1931); Newark Dodgers (1934)

Goldsbirgh Arthur Monroe Cephus (October 16, 1898 – December 9, 1983) was an American Negro league outfielder in the 1920s and 1930s.

A native of Preston, Maryland, Cephus made his Negro leagues debut in 1928 with the Cleveland Tigers and Memphis Red Sox. He went on to play for the Bacharach Giants in 1931 and the Newark Dodgers in 1934. Cephus died in Philadelphia, Pennsylvania in 1983 at age 85.
