= Dewitt Owens =

American baseball player

- Shortstop
- Born: September 25, 1900; Austin, Texas, U.S.
- Died: May 2, 1983 (aged 82); Austin, Texas, U.S.
- Threw: Right

Negro league baseball debut
- 1926, for the Cleveland Elites

Last appearance
- 1930, for the Birmingham Black Barons

Teams
- Cleveland Elites (1926); Birmingham Black Barons (1927–1928); Memphis Red Sox (1929); Birmingham Black Barons (1930)

Dewitt Owens (September 25, 1900 – May 2, 1983) was an American Negro league baseball shortstop between 1926 and 1930.

A native of Austin, Texas, Owens attended Samuel Huston College. He made his Negro leagues debut in 1926 with the Cleveland Elites. He went on to play for the Birmingham Black Barons the following two seasons, then spent a year with the Memphis Red Sox before finishing his career back in Birmingham in 1930. Owens died in Austin in 1983 at age 82.
