= John Fallings =

Professional baseball player

- Pitcher
- Born: November 3, 1926; Lamar County, Georgia, U.S.
- Died: September 22, 1983 (aged 56); Atlanta, Georgia, U.S.
- Batted: Unknown Threw: Right

Negro league baseball debut
- 1947, for the New York Black Yankees

Last appearance
- 1948, for the New York Black Yankees

Teams
- New York Black Yankees (1947–1948)

John Frank "Junior" Fallings (November 3, 1926 – September 22, 1983) was an American professional baseball pitcher who played for the New York Black Yankees of the Negro National League in 1947 and 1948.

== Career ==
A native of Lamar County, Georgia, Fallings began his baseball career with the Atlantic Black Crackers at age 16 in the early 1940s.

During World War II, he served in the United States Army and was discharged on March 6, 1946.

By 1947, he had joined the New York Black Yankees. He appeared in one documented Negro National League game, pitching 2.0 innings in relief on May 16, 1947 in a game against the Baltimore Elite Giants. In June 1947, the Rochester Democrat and Chronicle speculated that Fallings could be the first Black pitcher to enter the major leagues, one month before Dan Bankhead would accomplish the feat with the Brooklyn Dodgers. He later appeared in a game against the Negro American League's Chicago American Giants on August 7. Fallings was one of eight players to return to the team for the 1948 season.

Though primarily a pitcher, he also played left field. Fallings died in Atlanta, Georgia in 1983 at age 56.
