= Chancelor Edwards =

American baseball player (1901–1983)

- Catcher
- Born: January 28, 1901; Daingerfield, Texas, U.S.
- Died: June 2, 1983 (aged 82); Mount Pleasant, Texas, U.S.
- Batted: Unknown Threw: Unknown

Negro league baseball debut
- 1928, for the Cleveland Tigers

Last appearance
- 1928, for the Cleveland Tigers
- Stats at Baseball Reference

Teams
- Cleveland Tigers (1928)

Chancelor D. Edwards (January 28, 1901 – June 2, 1983) was an American professional baseball catcher in the Negro leagues. He played with the Cleveland Tigers in 1928.
