= Richie Martin =

American baseball player (born 1994)

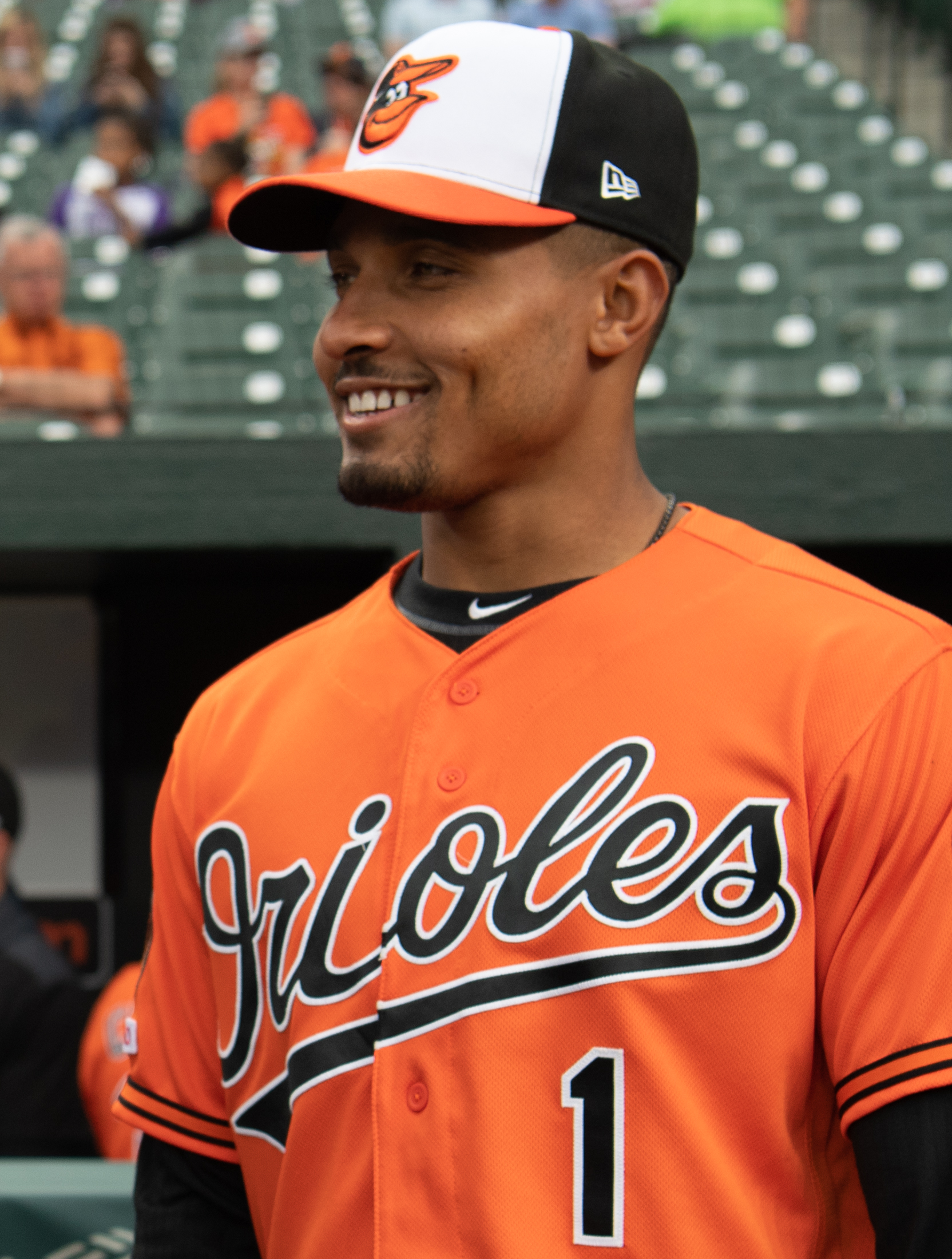
- Martin with the Baltimore Orioles

Free agent
- Shortstop
- Born: December 22, 1994 (age 31); Detroit, Michigan, U.S.
- Bats: Right Throws: Right

MLB debut
- March 28, 2019, for the Baltimore Orioles

MLB statistics (through 2022 season)
- Batting average: .212
- Home runs: 7
- Runs batted in: 34
- Stats at Baseball Reference

Teams
- Baltimore Orioles (2019, 2021–2022)

Richard Allen Martin Jr. (born December 22, 1994) is an American professional baseball shortstop who is a free agent. He has previously played in Major League Baseball (MLB) for the Baltimore Orioles. He attended the University of Florida and played college baseball for the Florida Gators before the Oakland Athletics selected him in the first round of the 2015 MLB draft.

== Early life and college ==
Martin was born in Detroit, Michigan and lived there until his family relocated to the suburbs of Tampa, Florida after his father, a school teacher, retired. Martin attended Bloomingdale High School in Valrico, Florida. As a senior, he hit .438. Martin committed to enroll at the University of Florida to play college baseball for the Florida Gators baseball team.

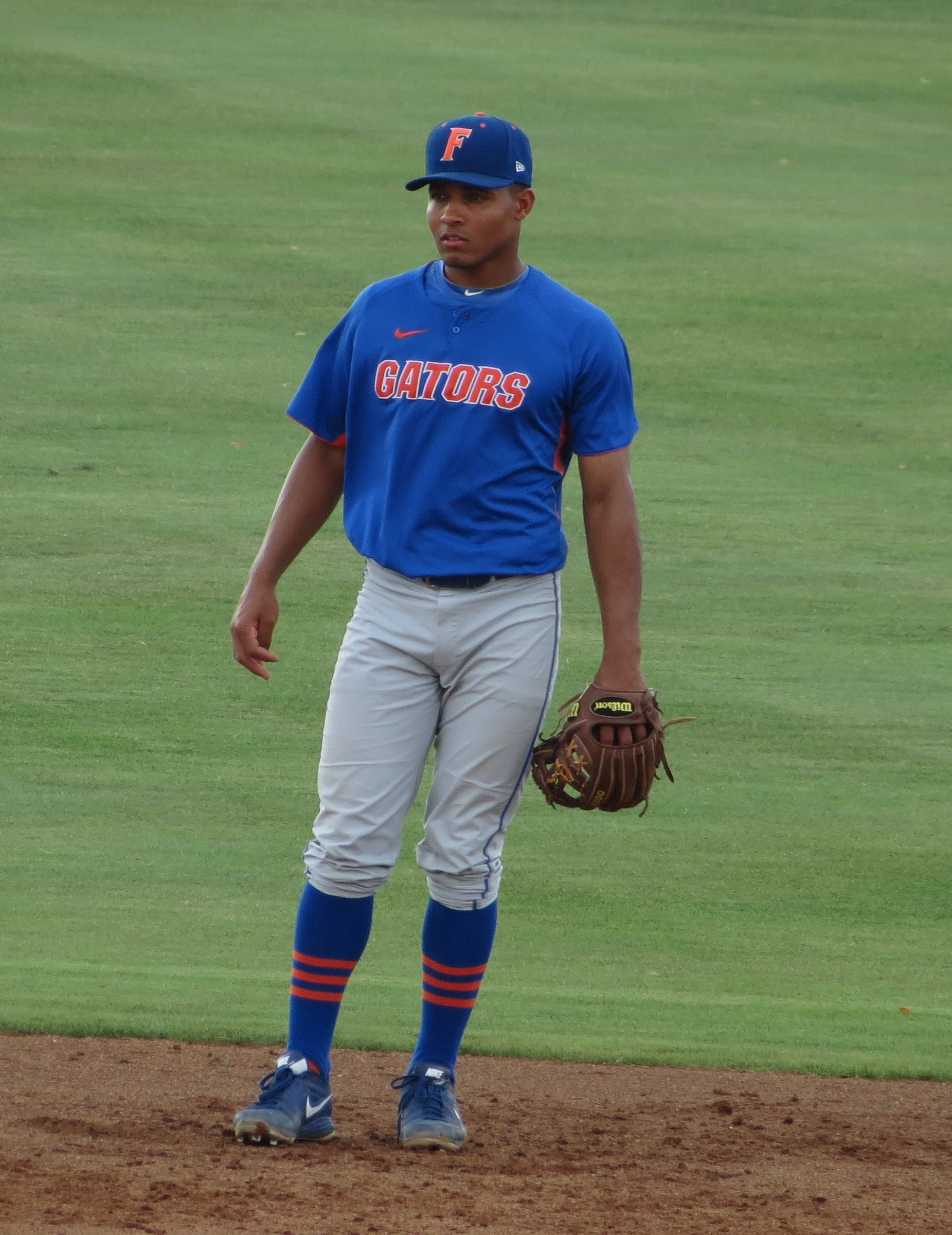
Martin playing for Florida in 2013

In the 2012 Major League Baseball draft, the Seattle Mariners selected Martin in the 38th round, with the 1,151st overall selection of the draft. He opted not to sign with Seattle, fulfilling his commitment to Florida, where he majored in civil engineering. As a freshman in 2013, he became the Gators' starting shortstop and batted .300 with 51 hits in 44 games. In the summer, Martin played in the Cape Cod League as a member of the Falmouth Commodores and batted .193 with 19 runs scored and 11 stolen bases.

Martin led the Gators in at bats (249), stolen bases (18) and runs scored (49) while batting .265 as a sophomore in 2014. Following the end of the season, Martin returned to the Cape Cod League and played for the Bourne Braves, where he hit .364, the highest average in Braves history and second in the league, while leading the league with 59 hits and 36 runs scored and was selected to play in the league's All-Star Game. In 2015, Martin was named to the preseason Golden Spikes Award watch list. He finished the season with a .291 batting average and set career highs with 77 hits, 63 runs scored, 36 runs batted in (RBIs), and 20 stolen bases. He was a finalist for the Brooks Wallace Award. In three collegiate seasons, Martin recorded a career batting average of .284 with 193 hits, 136 runs scored, 81 RBIs, 45 stolen bases, 27 doubles, seven home runs and seven triples in 176 games played. He studied civil engineering while at Florida and was named Southeastern Conference Academic Honor Roll all three seasons.

== Professional career ==
=== Oakland Athletics ===
In the 2015 Major League Baseball draft, the Oakland Athletics selected Martin in the first round, with the 20th overall selection. Martin signed with the Athletics. Martin spent 2015 playing for the Vermont Lake Monsters of the New York-Penn League. He finished 2015 batting .237 with two home runs and 16 RBIs in 51 games. Martin spent the 2016 season with both the Stockton Ports and the Midland RockHounds, posting a combined a .235 batting average with three home runs, 38 RBIs and 14 stolen bases in 91 total games between the two teams. In 2017, he played for both Midland and the Stockton Ports, batting .234 with four home runs and 33 RBIs in 109 total games, and in 2018, he played with Midland, slashing .300/.368/.439 with six home runs, 42 RBIs, and 25 stolen bases in 118 games.

=== Baltimore Orioles ===
On December 13, 2018, the Baltimore Orioles selected Martin with the first selection of the Rule 5 draft. Martin made the Orioles' Opening Day roster and made his major league debut on Opening Day against the New York Yankees. Martin recorded his first Major League hit, a single off James Paxton, and his first career stolen base on March 30, 2019. He hit his first career home run on May 22, 2019, off CC Sabathia in a 7-5 loss to the Yankees. Martin finished his rookie season with a .208 batting average with six home runs, 29 runs, 23 RBI, and 10 stolen bases in 120 games played, including 90 starts at shortstop (3rd most by a rookie in Orioles history).

Martin underwent wrist surgery on July 15, 2020, putting him out for two to three months and ending his 2020 season. In late January 2021, Martin suffered a broken hamate bone in his left hand while working out and required surgery. On May 19, 2021, it was announced that Martin suffered a non-displaced fracture in the radius bone of his left wrist, putting him out for eight to twelve weeks. He was placed on the 60-day injured list on May 31. On August 2, Martin was activated from the injured list and added to the major league roster. On November 30, the Orioles outrighted Martin off of the 40-man roster and assigned him to the Norfolk Tides.

Martin began the 2022 season with Norfolk, and Baltimore promoted Martin to the major leagues on June 11. In his second game with Baltimore on June 12 against the Kansas City Royals, Martin went 3-for-5 with two triples and two RBI. In 13 appearances for the Orioles, he batted .167/.242/.300 with three RBI and three stolen bases. Martin was designated for assignment following the promotion of Jesús Aguilar on September 1. He cleared waivers and was sent outright to Triple-A Norfolk on September 3. Martin elected free agency on October 6.

=== Washington Nationals ===
On January 17, 2023, Martin signed a minor league contract with the Cincinnati Reds that included an invitation to spring training. He was released on March 28, shortly after being informed that he would not make the Opening Day roster.

On April 14, 2023, Martin signed a minor league contract with the Washington Nationals and was assigned to the Triple-A Rochester Red Wings. In 113 games for the Triple–A Rochester Red Wings, he batted .217/.329/.314 with 3 home runs, 36 RBI, and 29 stolen bases. Martin elected free agency following the season on November 6.

=== Gastonia Ghost Peppers ===
On January 8, 2024, Martin signed a minor league contract with the Los Angeles Angels. After going 1–for–10 with five strikeouts in spring training, Martin was released by the Angels organization on March 3.

On July 5, 2024, Martin signed with the Gastonia Ghost Peppers of the Atlantic League of Professional Baseball. In 37 games for Gastonia, he batted .244/.326/.430 with five home runs, 15 RBI, and 22 stolen bases. Martin became a free agent following the season.

On April 17, 2025, Martin re-signed with the Ghost Peppers. In 22 appearances for Gastonia, he slashed .318/.416/.624 seven home runs, 16 RBI, and seven stolen bases.

=== Texas Rangers ===
On May 24, 2025, Martin's contract was purchased by the Texas Rangers. He made 79 appearances for the Triple-A Round Rock Express, batting .258/.348/.369 with three home runs, 30 RBI, and 25 stolen bases.

On November 10, 2025, Martin re-signed with the Rangers on a minor league contract. Martin was assigned to Round Rock to begin the 2026 season, slashing .234/.345/.362 with four home runs, 23 RBI, and 12 stolen bases.

=== Colorado Rockies ===
On June 7, 2026, Martin was traded to the Colorado Rockies organization. He made 12 appearances for the Triple–A Albuquerque Isotopes, batting .125/.222/.200 with one home run, three RBI, and one stolen base. Martin was released by the Rockies organization on July 24.

== Personal life ==
Martin's maternal grandfather, Walter Lewis Thomas, played professional baseball in the Negro leagues and was a teammate of Satchel Paige and Jackie Robinson as a member of the Kansas City Monarchs.

== See also ==
- Rule 5 draft results
