= Orrel Thomas =

American baseball player

- Pitcher
- Born: May 28, 1913; Mobile, Alabama, U.S.
- Died: January 8, 1945 (aged 31); River Rouge, Michigan, U.S.
- Threw: Right

Negro league baseball debut
- 1937, for the Detroit Stars

Last appearance
- 1937, for the Detroit Stars

Teams
- Detroit Stars (1937)

Orrel Lee Thomas (May 28, 1913 – January 8, 1945), nicknamed "Little Dean", was an American Negro league pitcher in the 1930s.

A native of Mobile, Alabama, Thomas was the younger brother of fellow Negro leaguer Walter Thomas. He played for the Detroit Stars in 1937, posting a 5.63 ERA over 40 innings in six recorded appearances on the mound. Thomas died in River Rouge, Michigan in 1945 at age 31.
