= Frank Tabacchi =

American baseball umpire (1910-1983)

- Born: Frank Tule Tabacchi; October 4, 1910; West New York, New Jersey, U.S.
- Died: October 26, 1983 (aged 73); Hoboken, New Jersey, U.S.
- Occupation: Umpire
- Years active: 1956-1959
- Employer: American League

Frank Tule Tabacchi (October 4, 1910 - October 26, 1983) was an American professional baseball umpire who worked in the American League from 1956 to 1959. Tabacchi umpired 515 major league games in his four-year career.

== Career ==
Tabacchi began umpiring minor league baseball in 1946. By 1949, he was in the International League. He was promoted to the major leagues in 1956.

In June 1959, Tabacchi faced a midseason demotion to the minor leagues. Media sources reported that Tabacchi's reassignment would be part of a major shakeup designed by league president Joe Cronin to ensure the quality of American League umpiring.
