= 1983 Philadelphia Phillies season =

Major League Baseball season

1983 Philadelphia Phillies
- National League champions National League East champions
- League: National League
- Division: East
- Ballpark: Veterans Stadium
- City: Philadelphia
- Record: 90–72 (.556)
- Divisional place: 1st
- Owners: Bill Giles
- General managers: Paul Owens
- Managers: Pat Corrales, Paul Owens
- Television: WTAF; PRISM
- Radio: WCAU (Harry Kalas, Richie Ashburn, Andy Musser, Chris Wheeler)

The 1983 Philadelphia Phillies season was the 101st season in the history of the franchise, and the 13th season for the Philadelphia Phillies at Veterans Stadium. The Phillies won the National League East title with a record of 90–72, by a margin of six games over the Pittsburgh Pirates. They defeated the Los Angeles Dodgers, three games to one in the NLCS, before losing the World Series to the Baltimore Orioles, four games to one. The Phillies celebrated their centennial in 1983, were managed by Pat Corrales (43–42) and Paul Owens (47–30), and played their home games at Veterans Stadium.

== Offseason ==
- November 4, 1982: Willie Montañez was released by the Phillies.
- December 9, 1982: Manny Trillo, Jay Baller, Julio Franco, George Vukovich, and Jerry Willard were traded by the Phillies to the Cleveland Indians for Von Hayes.
- December 14, 1982: Mike Krukow, Mark Davis, and Charles Penigar (minors) were traded by the Phillies to the San Francisco Giants for Joe Morgan and Al Holland.
- January 13, 1983: Rowland Office was released by the Phillies.
- January 31, 1983: Tony Pérez was signed as a free agent with the Phillies.
- March 1, 1983: Kiko Garcia was signed as a free agent by the Phillies.

== Wheeze Kids ==
The 1983 Phillies were nicknamed the "Wheeze Kids" because of the numerous veteran players on the team. The 1950 National League pennant winning Phillies had been nicknamed the "Whiz Kids" due to their youth; stars Richie Ashburn, Robin Roberts, Willie Jones, Del Ennis, and Granny Hamner were all 25 years old or younger. Prior to the 1983 season, the Phillies acquired Morgan, age 39 and Tony Pérez, age 40, to complement Pete Rose, age 41, and as Morgan told Sports Illustrated in March 1983, "...help win them a world championship." At the time, the Phillies also had Ron Reed, 40, Bill Robinson, 39, Steve Carlton, 38, and Tug McGraw, 38. Philadelphia Daily News sportswriter Stan Hochman gave them the Wheeze Kids nickname and it was quickly adopted and used by Phillies president Bill Giles. By the 1983 World Series, the moniker was commonly used to refer to the team.

== Regular season ==
=== Season chronology ===
- April 13: Bo Díaz hit a walk off grand slam home run with two outs in the bottom of the ninth inning to give the Phillies a 10–9 win over the New York Mets.
- May 1: On the 100th anniversary of their first game, the Phillies defeated the Houston Astros, 11–3, at Veterans Stadium. Tony Pérez drove in 5 runs. Johnny Enzmann, 93 years old and the then-living oldest former Phillies player threw out the first-pitch prior to the game.
- June 7: Steve Carlton temporarily passed Nolan Ryan as the all-time strikeout leader with 3,526 strikeouts to Ryan's 3,524.
- June 25: Kevin Gross was the winning pitcher in his major league debut. The Phillies defeated the Mets, 4–2, at Shea Stadium.
- July 17: The Phillies lost to the Cincinnati Reds, 5–2. It is the last game for manager Pat Corrales, who was fired despite the team being in first place in the National League East. He was replaced by Paul Owens.
- August 1: Steve Carlton struck out 12 batters in a 2–1 win over the Chicago Cubs. Joe Carter drove in the Cubs' run with his first major league hit.
- August 6: A single by Von Hayes scored Joe Morgan in the 11th inning, giving the Phillies a 1–0 win over the St. Louis Cardinals at Busch Stadium. This put the Phillies back into first place, one-half game ahead of the Pittsburgh Pirates.
- August 26: The Phillies defeated the Los Angeles Dodgers, 4–1, at Veterans Stadium. It was their only win against the Dodgers all season.
- September 18: The Phillies took over first place for good with a 5–3 win over the Cardinals. Mike Schmidt drove in his 100th run of the season with a first-inning home run. Joe Lefebvre followed Schmidt with a home run of his own.
- September 23: Steve Carlton won his 300th career game, defeating his former team, the Cardinals.
- September 28: The Phillies became National League East champions with a 13–6 win over the Cubs at Wrigley Field. The clincher was also the 7000th victory for the Phillies in their history.

=== Season standings ===
NL East
| Team | W | L | Pct. | GB | Home | Road |
|---|---|---|---|---|---|---|
| Philadelphia Phillies | 90 | 72 | .556 | — | 50‍–‍31 | 40‍–‍41 |
| Pittsburgh Pirates | 84 | 78 | .519 | 6 | 41‍–‍40 | 43‍–‍38 |
| Montreal Expos | 82 | 80 | .506 | 8 | 46‍–‍35 | 36‍–‍45 |
| St. Louis Cardinals | 79 | 83 | .488 | 11 | 44‍–‍37 | 35‍–‍46 |
| Chicago Cubs | 71 | 91 | .438 | 19 | 43‍–‍38 | 28‍–‍53 |
| New York Mets | 68 | 94 | .420 | 22 | 41‍–‍41 | 27‍–‍53 |

=== Record vs. opponents ===
1983 National League record Sources:
| Team | ATL | CHC | CIN | HOU | LAD | MON | NYM | PHI | PIT | SD | SF | STL |
|---|---|---|---|---|---|---|---|---|---|---|---|---|
| Atlanta | — | 5–7 | 12–6 | 11–7 | 7–11 | 7–5 | 8–4 | 7–5 | 6–6 | 9–9 | 9–9 | 7–5 |
| Chicago | 7–5 | — | 4–8 | 5–7 | 6–6 | 7–11 | 9–9 | 5–13 | 9–9 | 5–7 | 4–8 | 10–8 |
| Cincinnati | 6–12 | 8–4 | — | 5–13 | 7–11 | 4–8 | 7–5 | 6–6 | 6–6 | 9–9 | 10–8 | 6–6 |
| Houston | 7–11 | 7–5 | 13–5 | — | 6–12 | 8–4 | 9–3 | 4–8 | 6–6 | 11–7 | 12–6 | 2–10 |
| Los Angeles | 11–7 | 6–6 | 11–7 | 12–6 | — | 7–5 | 7–5 | 11–1 | 6–6 | 6–12–1 | 5–13 | 9–3 |
| Montreal | 5–7 | 11–7 | 8–4 | 4–8 | 5–7 | — | 8–10 | 8–10–1 | 8–10 | 8–4 | 8–4 | 9–9 |
| New York | 4–8 | 9–9 | 5–7 | 3–9 | 5–7 | 10–8 | — | 6–12 | 9–9 | 6–6 | 5–7 | 6–12 |
| Philadelphia | 5–7 | 13–5 | 6–6 | 8–4 | 1–11 | 10–8–1 | 12–6 | — | 11–7 | 5–7 | 5–7 | 14–4 |
| Pittsburgh | 6–6 | 9–9 | 6–6 | 6–6 | 6–6 | 10–8 | 9–9 | 7–11 | — | 9–3 | 6–6 | 10–8 |
| San Diego | 9–9 | 7–5 | 9–9 | 7–11 | 12–6–1 | 4–8 | 6–6 | 7–5 | 3–9 | — | 11–7 | 6–6 |
| San Francisco | 9–9 | 8–4 | 8–10 | 6–12 | 13–5 | 4–8 | 7–5 | 7–5 | 6–6 | 7–11 | — | 4–8 |
| St. Louis | 5–7 | 8–10 | 6–6 | 10–2 | 3–9 | 9–9 | 12–6 | 4–14 | 8–10 | 6–6 | 8–4 | — |

=== Notable transactions ===
- May 22, 1983: Dick Ruthven and Bill Johnson were traded by the Phillies to the Chicago Cubs for Willie Hernández.
- May 22, 1983: Sid Monge was traded by the Phillies to the San Diego Padres for Joe Lefebvre.
- June 17, 1983: Jim Rasmussen (minors) and Kelly Faulk (minors) were traded by the Phillies to the New York Yankees for Dave Wehrmeister.
- August 31, 1983: The Phillies traded players to be named later to the San Diego Padres for Sixto Lezcano and a player to be named later. The Phillies completed their part of the deal by sending Marty Decker, Ed Wojna, Lance McCullers, and Darren Burroughs (minors) to the Padres on September 20. The Padres completed their part of the deal by sending Steve Fireovid to the Phillies on October 11.

==== Draft picks ====
- June 6, 1983: 1983 Major League Baseball draft
  - Ricky Jordan was drafted by the Phillies in the 1st round (22nd pick). Player signed June 28, 1983.
- June 6, 1983: Mike Henneman was drafted by the Phillies in the 2nd round of the Secondary Phase, but did not sign.

=== Roster ===
1983 Philadelphia Phillies
Roster
| Pitchers: 30 Porfi Altamirano; 47 Larry Andersen; 50 Marty Bystrom; 32 Steve Carlton; 39 Don Carman; 38 Larry Christenson; 44 Steve Comer; 40 John Denny; 22 Ed Farmer; 35 Tony Ghelfi; 46 Kevin Gross; 48 Willie Hernández; 19 Al Holland; 49 Charles Hudson; 45 Tug McGraw; 49 Sid Monge; 42 Ron Reed; 44 Dick Ruthven | Catchers: 10 Darren Daulton; 6 Bo Díaz; 17 Ozzie Virgil; Infielders: 33 Luis Aguayo; 28 Tim Corcoran; 11 Iván DeJesús; 18 Kiko Garcia; 15 Steve Jeltz; 12 Len Matuszek; 15 Larry Milbourne; 8 Joe Morgan; 24 Tony Pérez; 28 Bill Robinson; 14 Pete Rose; 16 Juan Samuel; 20 Mike Schmidt | Outfielders: 29 Bob Dernier; 21 Greg Gross; 9 Von Hayes; 23 Joe Lefebvre; 43,28 Sixto Lezcano; 31 Garry Maddox; 34 Gary Matthews; 27 Alejandro Sánchez; 26 Jeff Stone; Other batters: 26 Bob Molinaro | Manager: 5 Pat Corrales; 5 Paul Owens; Coaches: 4 Dave Bristol (Third Base); 2 Deron Johnson (Hitting & First Base); 3 Claude Osteen (Pitching); 25 Mike Ryan (Bullpen); 7 Bobby Wine (Bench) |

== Game log ==
=== Regular season ===
Legend
| | Phillies win |
| | Phillies loss |
| | Phillies tie |
| | Postponement |
| | Clinched division |
| **Bold** | Phillies team member |

1983 Philadelphia Phillies Regular Season game log: 90–72–1 (Home: 50–31–1; Away: 40–41)
April: 11–7 (Home: 6–2; Away: 5–5)

| # | Date | Time (ET) | Opponent | Score | Win | Loss | Save | Time of Game | Attendance | Record | Box/ Streak |
|---|---|---|---|---|---|---|---|---|---|---|---|
| 1 | April 5 | | @ Mets | 0–2 | Doug Sisk (1–0) | **Steve Carlton** (0–1) | None | | 46,687 | 0–1 | |
| 2 | April 7 | | @ Mets | 2–6 | Craig Swan (1–0) | **John Denny** (0–1) | Neil Allen (1) | | 5,730 | 0–2 | |
| 3 | April 8 | | @ Giants | 2–3 | Fred Breining (1–0) | **Larry Christenson** (0–1) | Greg Minton (1) | | 13,624 | 0–3 | |
| 4 | April 9 | | @ Giants | 5–4 | **Sid Monge** (1–0) | Mike Krukow (0–2) | **Ron Reed** (1) | | 13,937 | 1–3 | |
| 5 | April 10 | | @ Giants | 10–2 | **Steve Carlton** (1–1) | Bill Laskey (0–2) | None | | 20,988 | 2–3 | |
| 6 | April 12 | | Mets | 4–3 (10) | **Ron Reed** (1–0) | Neil Allen (0–1) | None | | 31,236 | 3–3 | |
| 7 | April 13 | | Mets | 10–9 | **Porfi Altamirano** (1–0) | Neil Allen (0–2) | None | | 20,228 | 4–3 | |
| – | April 15 | | Braves | Postponed (rain); Makeup: July 12 as a traditional double-header | | | | | | | |
| 8 | April 16 | | Braves | 8–4 | **Steve Carlton** (2–1) | Phil Niekro (0–1) | None | | 17,557 | 5–3 | |
| 9 | April 17 | | Braves | 1–3 | Pascual Pérez (3–0) | **Ed Farmer** (0–1) | Gene Garber (2) | | 27,522 | 5–4 | |
| 10 | April 18 | | Cubs | 8–2 | **John Denny** (1–1) | Paul Moskau (0–1) | None | | 13,832 | 6–4 | |
| – | April 19 | | Cubs | Postponed (rain); Makeup: July 30 as a traditional double-header | | | | | | | |
| 11 | April 20 | | Cubs | 2–0 | **Steve Carlton** (3–1) | Chuck Rainey (0–3) | None | | 11,271 | 7–4 | |
| 12 | April 22 | | @ Astros | 6–3 | **Sid Monge** (2–0) | Nolan Ryan (1–1) | **Ron Reed** (2) | | 32,130 | 8–4 | |
| 13 | April 23 | | @ Astros | 7–3 | **John Denny** (2–1) | Joe Niekro (0–2) | None | | 22,790 | 9–4 | |
| 14 | April 24 | | @ Astros | 2–3 (11) | Mike Madden (1–0) | **Ron Reed** (1–1) | None | | 9,344 | 9–5 | |
| 15 | April 26 | | @ Braves | 4–10 | Pascual Pérez (4–0) | **Larry Christenson** (0–2) | Terry Forster (2) | | 22,511 | 9–6 | |
| 16 | April 27 | | @ Braves | 6–2 | **Dick Ruthven** (1–0) | Phil Niekro (0–2) | None | | 20,341 | 10–6 | |
| 17 | April 29 | | Astros | 3–6 (10) | Frank LaCorte (2–2) | **Steve Carlton** (3–2) | Bill Dawley (1) | | 30,067 | 10–7 | |
| 18 | April 30 | | Astros | 8–0 | **John Denny** (3–1) | Mike LaCoss (0–2) | None | | 24,845 | 11–7 | |

May: 9–13 (Home: 6–7; Away: 3–6)

| # | Date | Time (ET) | Opponent | Score | Win | Loss | Save | Time of Game | Attendance | Record | Box/ Streak |
|---|---|---|---|---|---|---|---|---|---|---|---|
| 19 | May 1 | | Astros | 11–3 | **Larry Christenson** (1–2) | Bob Knepper (1–3) | None | | 27,968 | 12–7 | |
| 20 | May 2 | | Reds | 2–5 | Ted Power (1–0) | **Dick Ruthven** (1–1) | None | | 18,587 | 12–8 | |
| 21 | May 3 | | Reds | 13–7 | **Sid Monge** (3–0) | Frank Pastore (2–4) | None | | 18,634 | 13–8 | |
| 22 | May 4 | | Reds | 9–4 | **Steve Carlton** (4–2) | Rich Gale (3–1) | None | | 22,619 | 14–8 | |
| 23 | May 6 | | @ Expos | 5–2 | **Ron Reed** (2–1) | Bryn Smith (0–1) | None | | 25,178 | 15–8 | |
| 24 | May 7 | | @ Expos | 2–3 | Bill Gullickson (3–3) | **Porfi Altamirano** (1–1) | None | | 25,191 | 15–9 | |
| – | May 8 | | @ Expos | Postponed (rain); Makeup: June 21 as a traditional double-header | | | | | | | |
| 25 | May 10 | | @ Reds | 3–1 | **Steve Carlton** (5–2) | Ted Power (1–1) | None | | 18,694 | 16–9 | |
| 26 | May 11 | | @ Reds | 0–2 | Mario Soto (4–2) | **John Denny** (3–2) | None | | 16,337 | 16–10 | |
| 27 | May 12 | | @ Cubs | 3–6 | Chuck Rainey (3–3) | **Dick Ruthven** (1–2) | Bill Campbell (1) | | 8,162 | 16–11 | |
| 28 | May 13 | | @ Cubs | 2–10 | Steve Trout (2–5) | **Larry Christenson** (1–3) | None | | 11,254 | 16–12 | |
| – | May 14 | | @ Cubs | Postponed (rain); Makeup: August 16 as a traditional double-header | | | | | | | |
| 29 | May 15 | | @ Cubs | 5–3 (10) | **Steve Carlton** (6–2) | Lee Smith (0–2) | **Ron Reed** (3) | | 19,467 | 17–12 | |
| 30 | May 17 | | Giants | 2–1 | **John Denny** (4–2) | Andy McGaffigan (2–4) | **Al Holland** (1) | | 21,123 | 18–12 | |
| 31 | May 18 | | Giants | 1–8 | Mike Krukow (2–2) | **Dick Ruthven** (1–3) | Greg Minton (5) | | 20,987 | 18–13 | |
| 32 | May 20 | | Padres | 0–5 | Andy Hawkins (3–2) | **Steve Carlton** (6–3) | None | | 26,607 | 18–14 | |
| – | May 21 | | Padres | Postponed (rain); Makeup: August 30 as a traditional double-header | | | | | | | |
| – | May 22 | | Padres | Postponed (rain); Makeup: August 29 as a traditional double-header | | | | | | | |
| 33 | May 23 | | Dodgers | 0–2 | Fernando Valenzuela (5–2) | **John Denny** (4–3) | None | | 24,249 | 18–15 | L3 |
| 34 | May 24 | | Dodgers | 0–3 | Alejandro Peña (5–1) | **Larry Christenson** (1–4) | None | | 24,016 | 18–16 | L4 |
| 35 | May 25 | | Dodgers | 1–6 | Burt Hooton (2–2) | **Marty Bystrom** (0–1) | Dave Stewart (5) | | 22,735 | 18–17 | L5 |
| 36 | May 27 | | Expos | 4–7 | Scott Sanderson (4–4) | **Steve Carlton** (6–4) | Jeff Reardon (5) | | 25,573 | 18–18 | |
| 37 | May 28 | | Expos | 5–3 | **Willie Hernández** (2–0) | Jeff Reardon (2–2) | None | | 30,608 | 19–18 | |
| 38 | May 29 | | Expos | 5–2 | **Larry Christenson** (2–4) | Bill Gullickson (4–6) | **Al Holland** (2) | | 18,875 | 20–18 | |
| 39 | May 30 | | @ Dodgers | 2–5 | Burt Hooton (3–2) | **Marty Bystrom** (0–2) | None | | 42,184 | 20–19 | L1 |
| 40 | May 31 | | @ Dodgers | 1–4 | Jerry Reuss (6–3) | **Charles Hudson** (0–1) | None | | 32,784 | 20–20 | L2 |

June: 14–15–1 (Home: 6–3–1; Away: 8–12)

| # | Date | Time (ET) | Opponent | Score | Win | Loss | Save | Time of Game | Attendance | Record | Box/ Streak |
|---|---|---|---|---|---|---|---|---|---|---|---|
| 41 | June 1 | | @ Dodgers | 0–1 | Bob Welch (4–4) | **Steve Carlton** (6–5) | None | | 39,319 | 20–21 | L3 |
| 42 | June 2 | | @ Padres | 1–4 | Dave Dravecky (8–3) | **Ed Farmer** (0–2) | None | | 14,474 | 20–22 | |
| 43 | June 3 | | @ Padres | 5–8 | Gary Lucas (2–3) | **Ed Farmer** (0–3) | None | | 18,211 | 20–23 | |
| 44 | June 4 | | @ Padres | 4–5 | John Montefusco (4–1) | **Marty Bystrom** (0–3) | Sid Monge (1) | | 33,982 | 20–24 | |
| 45 | June 5 | | @ Padres | 2–1 | **Al Holland** (1–0) | Ed Whitson (0–3) | None | | 21,876 | 21–24 | |
| 46 | June 7 | | Cardinals | 1–2 | Bob Forsch (4–4) | **Steve Carlton** (6–6) | None | | 34,274 | 21–25 | |
| 47 | June 8 | | Cardinals | 7–4 | **Al Holland** (2–0) | Bruce Sutter (4–3) | None | | 23,531 | 22–25 | |
| 48 | June 9 | | Cardinals | 6–5 (11) | **Ron Reed** (3–1) | Dave Von Ohlen (1–1) | None | | 27,764 | 23–25 | |
| 49 | June 10 | | Pirates | 3–4 (12) | Kent Tekulve (2–1) | **Ed Farmer** (0–4) | None | | 31,092 | 23–26 | |
| 50 | June 11 | | Pirates | 9–7 | **Steve Carlton** (7–6) | Rod Scurry (2–4) | **Al Holland** (3) | | 34,820 | 24–26 | |
| 51 | June 12 | | Pirates | 5–4 (11) | **Ron Reed** (4–1) | Rod Scurry (2–5) | None | | 37,154 | 25–26 | |
| 52 | June 13 | | @ Cardinals | 6–2 | **Marty Bystrom** (1–3) | Dave LaPoint (4–3) | **Willie Hernández** (2) | | 32,686 | 26–26 | |
| 53 | June 14 | | @ Cardinals | 4–5 | Bruce Sutter (6–3) | **Porfi Altamirano** (1–2) | None | | 28,813 | 26–27 | |
| 54 | June 15 | | @ Cardinals | 6–7 | Kevin Hagen (1–0) | **Steve Carlton** (7–7) | Bruce Sutter (5) | | 37,368 | 26–28 | |
| 55 | June 17 | | @ Pirates | 1–2 | John Candelaria (5–6) | **John Denny** (4–4) | Kent Tekulve (6) | | 19,814 | 26–29 | |
| 56 | June 18 | | @ Pirates | 6–4 | **Marty Bystrom** (2–3) | Rick Rhoden (3–7) | None | | 26,662 | 27–29 | |
| 57 | June 19 | | @ Pirates | 14–2 | **Charles Hudson** (1–1) | Larry McWilliams (7–5) | None | | 19,369 | 28–29 | |
| 58 | June 20 | | @ Expos | 0–5 | Ray Burris (3–2) | **Steve Carlton** (7–8) | None | | 24,171 | 28–30 | |
| 59 | June 21 (1) | | @ Expos | 8–1 | **John Denny** (5–4) | Scott Sanderson (4–5) | **Willie Hernández** (3) | | see 2nd game | 29–30 | |
| 60 | June 21 (2) | | @ Expos | 4–5 (12) | Jeff Reardon (3–4) | **Porfi Altamirano** (1–3) | None | | 38,222 | 29–31 | |
| 61 | June 22 | | @ Expos | 0–4 | Charlie Lea (5–3) | **Marty Bystrom** (2–4) | None | | 24,607 | 29–32 | |
| 62 | June 23 | | @ Expos | 3–4 | Bill Gullickson (7–8) | **Charles Hudson** (1–2) | Jeff Reardon (11) | | 31,069 | 29–33 | |
| 63 | June 24 | | @ Mets | 6–3 | **Steve Carlton** (8–8) | Craig Swan (1–4) | **Al Holland** (4) | | 20,093 | 30–33 | |
| 64 | June 25 | | @ Mets | 4–2 | **Kevin Gross** (1–0) | Walt Terrell (1–1) | **Willie Hernández** (4) | | 24,551 | 31–33 | |
| 65 | June 26 (1) | | @ Mets | 8–4 | **Tug McGraw** (1–0) | Tom Seaver (5–7) | **Al Holland** (5) | | see 2nd game | 32–33 | |
| 66 | June 26 (2) | | @ Mets | 1–5 | Mike Torrez (5–8) | **Ed Farmer** (0–5) | None | | 37,922 | 32–34 | |
| 67 | June 28 | | Expos | 5–5 (11) | None | None | None | | 32,181 | 32–34–1 | |
| 68 | June 29 (1) | | Expos | 2–5 | Steve Rogers (11–3) | **Steve Carlton** (8–9) | None | | see 2nd game | 32–35–1 | |
| 69 | June 29 (2) | | Expos | 3–2 | **Charles Hudson** (2–2) | Scott Sanderson (4–6) | **Al Holland** (6) | | 32,141 | 33–35–1 | |
| 70 | June 30 | | Expos | 3–1 | **Kevin Gross** (2–0) | Ray Burris (3–3) | **Willie Hernández** (5) | | 35,393 | 34–35–1 | |

July: 17–13 (Home: 11–8; Away: 6–5)

| # | Date | Time (ET) | Opponent | Score | Win | Loss | Save | Time of Game | Attendance | Record | Box/ Streak |
|---|---|---|---|---|---|---|---|---|---|---|---|
| 71 | July 1 | | Mets | 5–1 | **John Denny** (6–4) | Tom Seaver (5–8) | None | | 26,987 | 35–35–1 | |
| 72 | July 2 (1) | | Mets | 6–5 | **Al Holland** (3–0) | Jesse Orosco (4–4) | None | | see 2nd game | 36–35–1 | |
| 73 | July 2 (2) | | Mets | 3–4 | Ed Lynch (6–3) | **Ed Farmer** (0–6) | Doug Sisk (7) | | 40,045 | 36–36–1 | |
| 74 | July 3 | | Mets | 6–4 | **Willie Hernández** (3–0) | Doug Sisk (2–2) | None | | 32,962 | 37–36–1 | |
| 75 | July 4 | | Mets | 4–0 | **Steve Carlton** (9–9) | Walt Terrell (1–3) | None | | 52,710 | 38–36–1 | |
| – | July 6 | 8:40 p.m. EDT | **1983 Major League Baseball All-Star Game** at Comiskey Park in Chicago | | | | | | | | |
| 76 | July 8 | | @ Reds | 1–3 | Joe Price (7–5) | **John Denny** (6–5) | Bill Scherrer (6) | | 23,711 | 38–37–1 | |
| 77 | July 9 | | @ Reds | 1–2 | Tom Hume (1–3) | **Willie Hernández** (3–1) | None | | 32,511 | 38–38–1 | |
| 78 | July 10 | | @ Reds | 2–0 | **Marty Bystrom** (3–4) | Mario Soto (9–8) | **Al Holland** (7) | | 21,923 | 39–38–1 | |
| 79 | July 11 | | @ Reds | 11–7 (11) | **Al Holland** (4–0) | Tom Hume (1–4) | None | | 17,113 | 40–38–1 | |
| 80 | July 12 (1) | | Braves | 4–1 | **John Denny** (7–5) | Ken Dayley (2–1) | **Al Holland** (8) | | see 2nd game | 41–38–1 | |
| 81 | July 12 (2) | | Braves | 7–6 | **Willie Hernández** (4–1) | Steve Bedrosian (5–3) | None | | 32,491 | 42–38–1 | |
| 82 | July 13 | | Braves | 2–5 | Craig McMurtry (10–5) | **Steve Carlton** (9–10) | None | | 27,762 | 42–39–1 | |
| 83 | July 14 | | Braves | 2–5 | Steve Bedrosian (6–3) | **Willie Hernández** (4–2) | Terry Forster (9) | | 26,784 | 42–40–1 | |
| 84 | July 15 | | Reds | 2–3 | Mario Soto (10–8) | **Charles Hudson** (2–3) | None | | 27,797 | 42–41–1 | |
| 85 | July 16 | | Reds | 9–3 | **John Denny** (8–5) | Bruce Berenyi (4–10) | None | | 29,209 | 43–41–1 | |
| 86 | July 17 | | Reds | 2–5 | Frank Pastore (4–8) | **Kevin Gross** (2–1) | None | | 38,519 | 43–42–1 | |
| 87 | July 18 | | Astros | 2–8 | Joe Niekro (8–7) | **Steve Carlton** (9–11) | None | | 23,024 | 43–43–1 | |
| 88 | July 19 | | Astros | 3–7 | Bob Knepper (4–9) | **Marty Bystrom** (3–5) | Frank DiPino (10) | | 23,851 | 43–44–1 | |
| 89 | July 20 | | Astros | 10–3 | **Charles Hudson** (3–3) | Mike Scott (4–5) | None | | 21,052 | 44–44–1 | |
| 90 | July 21 | | @ Braves | 10–6 | **John Denny** (9–5) | Rick Camp (7–8) | None | | 29,316 | 45–44–1 | |
| 91 | July 22 | | @ Braves | 1–6 | Craig McMurtry (11–5) | **Kevin Gross** (2–2) | None | | 40,481 | 45–45–1 | |
| 92 | July 23 | | @ Braves | 5–6 | Rick Camp (8–8) | **Willie Hernández** (4–3) | None | | 36,501 | 45–46–1 | |
| 93 | July 24 | | @ Braves | 4–12 | Pascual Pérez (11–2) | **Marty Bystrom** (3–6) | None | | 29,406 | 45–47–1 | |
| 94 | July 26 | | @ Astros | 1–0 | **Charles Hudson** (4–3) | Nolan Ryan (9–4) | **Al Holland** (9) | | 25,954 | 46–47–1 | |
| 95 | July 27 | | @ Astros | 3–1 | **John Denny** (10–5) | Joe Niekro (8–8) | **Willie Hernández** (6) | | 18,781 | 47–47–1 | |
| 96 | July 28 | | @ Astros | 6–5 | **Ron Reed** (5–1) | Mike LaCoss (4–7) | **Al Holland** (10) | | 19,948 | 48–47–1 | |
| 97 | July 29 | | Cubs | 3–2 | **Al Holland** (5–0) | Lee Smith (4–6) | None | | 32,445 | 49–47–1 | |
| 98 | July 30 (1) | | Cubs | 3–4 | Bill Campbell (3–6) | **Willie Hernández** (4–4) | Lee Smith (15) | | see 2nd game | 49–48–1 | |
| 99 | July 30 (2) | | Cubs | 4–3 | **Charles Hudson** (5–3) | Steve Trout (8–9) | **Al Holland** (11) | | 44,332 | 50–48–1 | |
| 100 | July 31 | | Cubs | 5–2 | **John Denny** (11–5) | Dick Ruthven (7–9) | **Willie Hernández** (7) | | 36,011 | 51–48–1 | |

August: 16–16 (Home: 9–6; Away: 7–10)

| # | Date | Time (ET) | Opponent | Score | Win | Loss | Save | Time of Game | Attendance | Record | Box/ Streak |
|---|---|---|---|---|---|---|---|---|---|---|---|
| 101 | August 1 | | Cubs | 2–1 | **Steve Carlton** (10–11) | Bill Campbell (3–7) | None | | 27,739 | 52–48–1 | |
| 102 | August 2 | | @ Pirates | 3–10 | Larry McWilliams (11–5) | **Kevin Gross** (2–3) | None | | 25,130 | 52–49–1 | |
| 103 | August 3 | | @ Pirates | 2–7 | John Candelaria (11–6) | **Marty Bystrom** (3–7) | Kent Tekulve (12) | | 23,070 | 52–50–1 | |
| 104 | August 4 | | @ Pirates | 5–1 | **Charles Hudson** (6–3) | Rick Rhoden (8–9) | **Al Holland** (12) | | 20,574 | 53–50–1 | |
| 105 | August 5 | | @ Cardinals | 10–7 | **John Denny** (12–5) | John Stuper (7–8) | **Ron Reed** (4) | | 32,903 | 54–50–1 | |
| 106 | August 6 | | @ Cardinals | 1–0 (11) | **Al Holland** (6–0) | Bruce Sutter (8–7) | None | | 42,469 | 55–50–1 | |
| 107 | August 7 | | @ Cardinals | 5–2 | **Marty Bystrom** (4–7) | Neil Allen (7–11) | **Ron Reed** (5) | | 46,373 | 56–50–1 | |
| 108 | August 8 | | Pirates | 14–5 | **Charles Hudson** (7–3) | John Candelaria (11–7) | None | | 38,080 | 57–50–1 | |
| 109 | August 9 | | Pirates | 1–3 | Kent Tekulve (6–2) | **Al Holland** (6–1) | None | | 37,719 | 57–51–1 | |
| 110 | August 10 | | Pirates | 4–2 | **Steve Carlton** (11–11) | José DeLeón (2–2) | **Al Holland** (13) | | 38,705 | 58–51–1 | |
| 111 | August 12 | | Cardinals | 5–2 | **Marty Bystrom** (5–7) | Neil Allen (7–12) | **Willie Hernández** (8) | | 33,521 | 59–51–1 | |
| 112 | August 13 | | Cardinals | 2–6 | Dave LaPoint (10–7) | **Charles Hudson** (7–4) | None | | 40,541 | 59–52–1 | |
| 113 | August 14 | | Cardinals | 5–1 | **John Denny** (13–5) | Bob Forsch (7–11) | None | | 42,787 | 60–52–1 | |
| 114 | August 15 | | @ Cubs | 5–0 | **Steve Carlton** (12–11) | Steve Trout (9–10) | None | | 23,361 | 61–52–1 | |
| 115 | August 16 (1) | | @ Cubs | 1–10 | Dick Ruthven (9–9) | **Marty Bystrom** (5–8) | None | | see 2nd game | 61–53–1 | |
| 116 | August 16 (2) | | @ Cubs | 6–2 | **Willie Hernández** (5–4) | Mike Proly (1–5) | **Al Holland** (14) | | 28,124 | 62–53–1 | |
| 117 | August 17 | | @ Padres | 4–5 | Eric Show (12–8) | **Charles Hudson** (7–5) | Gary Lucas (13) | | 14,657 | 62–54–1 | |
| 118 | August 18 | | @ Padres | 4–2 (10) | **Al Holland** (7–1) | Gary Lucas (4–7) | **Ron Reed** (6) | | 9,755 | 63–54–1 | |
| 119 | August 19 | | @ Dodgers | 0–3 | Alejandro Peña (10–6) | **Steve Carlton** (12–12) | None | | 45,633 | 63–55–1 | L1 |
| 120 | August 20 | | @ Dodgers | 3–4 | Fernando Valenzuela (13–6) | **Marty Bystrom** (5–9) | Steve Howe (15) | | 48,986 | 63–56–1 | L2 |
| 121 | August 21 | | @ Dodgers | 0–6 | Rick Honeycutt (15–8) | **Kevin Gross** (2–4) | None | | 42,946 | 63–57–1 | L3 |
| 122 | August 22 | | @ Giants | 5–11 | Bill Laskey (13–10) | **Charles Hudson** (7–6) | Gary Lavelle (15) | | 16,048 | 63–58–1 | |
| 123 | August 23 | | @ Giants | 1–3 | Mike Krukow (9–7) | **Al Holland** (7–2) | Greg Minton (15) | | 6,885 | 63–59–1 | |
| 124 | August 24 | | @ Giants | 3–5 | Renie Martin (2–4) | **Steve Carlton** (12–13) | None | | 14,317 | 63–60–1 | |
| 125 | August 26 | | Dodgers | 4–1 | **Kevin Gross** (3–4) | Fernando Valenzuela (13–7) | **Al Holland** (15) | | 40,427 | 64–60–1 | W1 |
| 126 | August 27 | | Dodgers | 1–6 | Rick Honeycutt (16–8) | **Charles Hudson** (7–7) | None | | 43,482 | 64–61–1 | L1 |
| 127 | August 28 | | Dodgers | 3–8 | Jerry Reuss (9–10) | **John Denny** (13–6) | None | | 34,442 | 64–62–1 | L2 |
| 128 | August 29 (1) | | Padres | 5–6 | Luis DeLeón (4–5) | **Steve Carlton** (12–14) | None | | see 2nd game | 64–63–1 | |
| 129 | August 29 (2) | | Padres | 8–6 | **Steve Comer** (1–0) | Sid Monge (5–2) | **Al Holland** (16) | | 25,789 | 65–63–1 | |
| 130 | August 30 (1) | | Padres | 6–0 | **Kevin Gross** (4–4) | Andy Hawkins (3–6) | None | | see 2nd game | 66–63–1 | |
| 131 | August 30 (2) | | Padres | 5–7 | Ed Whitson (3–7) | **Tug McGraw** (1–1) | Luis DeLeón (12) | | 27,790 | 66–64–1 | |
| 132 | August 31 | | Padres | 4–3 | **Al Holland** (8–2) | Elías Sosa (1–3) | None | | 21,547 | 67–64–1 | |

September: 22–7 (Home: 11–4; Away: 11–3)

| # | Date | Time (ET) | Opponent | Score | Win | Loss | Save | Time of Game | Attendance | Record | Box/ Streak |
|---|---|---|---|---|---|---|---|---|---|---|---|
| 133 | September 1 | | Giants | 4–2 | **Tony Ghelfi** (1–0) | Atlee Hammaker (10–8) | **Al Holland** (17) | | 16,022 | 68–64–1 | |
| 134 | September 2 | | Giants | 5–3 | **Ron Reed** (6–1) | Gary Lavelle (6–4) | None | | 22,916 | 69–64–1 | |
| 135 | September 3 | | Giants | 4–5 | Mike Krukow (10–8) | **Steve Carlton** (12–15) | Greg Minton (17) | | 26,529 | 69–65–1 | |
| 136 | September 4 | | Giants | 4–10 | Andy McGaffigan (3–9) | **Kevin Gross** (4–5) | Greg Minton (18) | | 24,385 | 69–66–1 | |
| 137 | September 5 | | @ Mets | 5–6 | Jesse Orosco (13–5) | **Al Holland** (8–3) | None | | 8,474 | 69–67–1 | |
| 138 | September 6 | | @ Mets | 2–0 | **Tug McGraw** (2–1) | Ron Darling (0–1) | **Al Holland** (18) | | 8,863 | 70–67–1 | |
| 139 | September 7 | | @ Mets | 6–1 | **John Denny** (14–6) | Walt Terrell (6–7) | None | | 8,791 | 71–67–1 | |
| 140 | September 9 | | @ Pirates | 4–3 (13) | **Willie Hernández** (6–4) | Jim Bibby (4–12) | None | | 24,304 | 72–67–1 | |
| 141 | September 10 | | @ Pirates | 5–6 (10) | Kent Tekulve (7–4) | **Al Holland** (8–4) | None | | 26,246 | 72–68–1 | |
| 142 | September 11 | | @ Pirates | 5–3 | **Ron Reed** (7–1) | Cecilio Guante (2–4) | None | | 19,130 | 73–68–1 | |
| 143 | September 12 | | Mets | 2–1 | **John Denny** (15–6) | Ron Darling (0–2) | **Al Holland** (19) | | 10,257 | 74–68–1 | |
| 144 | September 13 | | Mets | 1–5 | Walt Terrell (7–7) | **Tony Ghelfi** (1–1) | None | | 15,635 | 74–69–1 | |
| 145 | September 14 (1) | | Expos | 9–5 | **Steve Carlton** (13–15) | Bryn Smith (4–10) | None | | see 2nd game | 75–69–1 | |
| 146 | September 14 (2) | | Expos | 5–0 | **Marty Bystrom** (6–9) | Ray Burris (4–7) | None | | 30,731 | 76–69–1 | |
| 147 | September 15 | | Expos | 1–4 | Bill Gullickson (15–11) | **Kevin Gross** (4–6) | Bob James (4) | | 25,047 | 76–70–1 | |
| 148 | September 16 | | Cardinals | 3–2 (13) | **Willie Hernández** (7–4) | Steve Baker (3–4) | None | | 30,069 | 77–70–1 | |
| 149 | September 17 | | Cardinals | 4–1 | **John Denny** (16–6) | Danny Cox (2–5) | **Al Holland** (20) | | 23,467 | 78–70–1 | |
| 150 | September 18 | | Cardinals | 5–3 | **Steve Carlton** (14–15) | Joaquín Andújar (6–15) | **Al Holland** (21) | | 30,915 | 79–70–1 | |
| 151 | September 19 | | Cubs | 7–6 | **Ron Reed** (8–1) | Lee Smith (4–10) | **Al Holland** (22) | | 21,289 | 80–70–1 | |
| 152 | September 20 | | Cubs | 8–5 | **Willie Hernández** (8–4) | Reggie Patterson (0–1) | **Ron Reed** (7) | | 20,312 | 81–70–1 | |
| – | September 21 | | @ Expos | Postponed (rain); Makeup: September 22 as a traditional double-header | | | | | | | |
| 153 | September 22 (1) | | @ Expos | 9–7 | **John Denny** (17–6) | Charlie Lea (15–10) | **Al Holland** (23) | | see 2nd game | 82–70–1 | |
| 154 | September 22 (2) | | @ Expos | 7–1 | **Charles Hudson** (8–7) | Steve Rogers (17–11) | None | | 47,364 | 83–70–1 | |
| 155 | September 23 | | @ Cardinals | 6–2 | **Steve Carlton** (15–15) | Joaquín Andújar (6–16) | None | | 27,266 | 84–70–1 | |
| 156 | September 24 | | @ Cardinals | 9–6 | **Ron Reed** (9–1) | Bruce Sutter (9–10) | None | | 27,441 | 85–70–1 | |
| 157 | September 25 | | @ Cardinals | 6–5 (10) | **Larry Andersen** (1–0) | Jeff Lahti (3–3) | **Al Holland** (24) | | 20,029 | 86–70–1 | |
| 158 | September 26 | | @ Cubs | 5–2 | **John Denny** (18–6) | Chuck Rainey (14–12) | **Ron Reed** (8) | | 3,137 | 87–70–1 | |
| 159 | September 27 | | @ Cubs | 0–3 | Steve Trout (10–14) | **Steve Carlton** (15–16) | Lee Smith (29) | | 6,593 | 87–71–1 | |
| 160 | September 28 | | @ Cubs | 13–6 | **Willie Hernández** (9–4) | Dick Ruthven (13–12) | None | | 7,680 | 88–71–1 | |
| 161 | September 30 | | Pirates | 2–1 | **John Denny** (19–6) | Larry McWilliams (15–8) | **Al Holland** (25) | | 26,685 | 89–71–1 | |

October: 1–1 (Home: 1–1; Away: 0–0)

| # | Date | Time (ET) | Opponent | Score | Win | Loss | Save | Time of Game | Attendance | Record | Box/ Streak |
|---|---|---|---|---|---|---|---|---|---|---|---|
| 162 | October 1 | | Pirates | 5–3 | **Porfi Altamirano** (2–3) | Cecilio Guante (2–6) | **Don Carman** (1) | | 34,763 | 90–71–1 | |
| 163 | October 2 | | Pirates | 0–4 | Lee Tunnell (11–6) | **Charles Hudson** (8–8) | None | | 33,284 | 90–72–1 | |

== Player stats ==
| = Indicates team leader |

| = Indicates league leader |

=== Batting ===
==== Starters by position ====
Note: Pos = Position; G = Games played; AB = At bats; H = Hits; Avg. = Batting average; HR = Home runs; RBI = Runs batted in

| Pos | Player | G | AB | H | Avg. | HR | RBI |
|---|---|---|---|---|---|---|---|
| C | Bo Díaz | 136 | 471 | 111 | .236 | 15 | 64 |
| 1B | Pete Rose | 151 | 493 | 121 | .245 | 0 | 45 |
| 2B | Joe Morgan | 123 | 404 | 93 | .230 | 16 | 59 |
| 3B | Mike Schmidt | 154 | 534 | 136 | .255 | 40 | 109 |
| SS | Iván DeJesús | 158 | 497 | 126 | .254 | 4 | 45 |
| LF | Gary Matthews | 132 | 446 | 115 | .258 | 10 | 50 |
| CF | Garry Maddox | 97 | 324 | 89 | .275 | 4 | 32 |
| RF | Von Hayes | 124 | 351 | 93 | .265 | 6 | 32 |

==== Other batters ====
Note: G = Games played; AB = At bats; H = Hits; Avg. = Batting average; HR = Home runs; RBI = Runs batted in

| Player | G | AB | H | Avg. | HR | RBI |
|---|---|---|---|---|---|---|
| Joe Lefebvre | 101 | 258 | 80 | .310 | 8 | 38 |
| Tony Pérez | 91 | 253 | 61 | .241 | 6 | 43 |
| Greg Gross | 136 | 245 | 74 | .302 | 0 | 29 |
| Bob Dernier | 122 | 221 | 51 | .231 | 1 | 15 |
| Ozzie Virgil | 55 | 140 | 30 | .214 | 6 | 23 |
| Kiko Garcia | 84 | 118 | 34 | .288 | 2 | 9 |
| Len Matuszek | 28 | 80 | 22 | .275 | 4 | 16 |
| Larry Milbourne | 41 | 66 | 16 | .242 | 0 | 4 |
| Juan Samuel | 18 | 65 | 18 | .277 | 2 | 5 |
| Sixto Lezcano | 18 | 39 | 11 | .282 | 0 | 7 |
| Bob Molinaro | 19 | 18 | 2 | .111 | 1 | 3 |
| Steve Jeltz | 13 | 8 | 1 | .125 | 0 | 1 |
| Bill Robinson | 10 | 7 | 1 | .143 | 0 | 2 |
| Alejandro Sánchez | 8 | 7 | 2 | .286 | 0 | 2 |
| Luis Aguayo | 2 | 4 | 1 | .250 | 0 | 0 |
| Jeff Stone | 9 | 4 | 3 | .750 | 0 | 3 |
| Darren Daulton | 2 | 3 | 1 | .333 | 0 | 0 |
| Tim Corcoran | 3 | 0 | 0 | ---- | 0 | 0 |

=== Pitching ===
==== Starting pitchers ====
Note: G = Games pitched; IP = Innings pitched; W = Wins; L = Losses; ERA = Earned run average; SO = Strikeouts

| Player | G | IP | W | L | ERA | SO |
|---|---|---|---|---|---|---|
| Steve Carlton | 37 | 283.2 | 15 | 16 | 3.11 | 275 |
| John Denny | 36 | 242.2 | 19 | 6 | 2.37 | 139 |
| Charles Hudson | 26 | 169.1 | 8 | 8 | 3.35 | 101 |
| Marty Bystrom | 24 | 119.1 | 6 | 9 | 4.60 | 87 |
| Kevin Gross | 17 | 96.0 | 4 | 6 | 3.56 | 66 |

==== Other pitchers ====
Note: G = Games pitched; IP = Innings pitched; W = Wins; L = Losses; ERA = Earned run average; SO = Strikeouts

| Player | G | IP | W | L | ERA | SO |
|---|---|---|---|---|---|---|
| Larry Christenson | 9 | 48.1 | 2 | 4 | 3.91 | 44 |
| Dick Ruthven | 7 | 33.2 | 1 | 3 | 5.61 | 26 |
| Tony Ghelfi | 3 | 14.1 | 1 | 1 | 3.14 | 14 |
| Steve Comer | 3 | 8.2 | 1 | 0 | 5.19 | 1 |

==== Relief pitchers ====
Note: G = Games pitched; W = Wins; L = Losses; SV = Saves; ERA = Earned run average; SO = Strikeouts

| Player | G | W | L | SV | ERA | SO |
|---|---|---|---|---|---|---|
| Al Holland | 68 | 8 | 4 | 25 | 2.26 | 100 |
| Ron Reed | 61 | 9 | 1 | 8 | 3.48 | 73 |
| Willie Hernández | 63 | 8 | 4 | 7 | 3.29 | 75 |
| Tug McGraw | 34 | 2 | 1 | 0 | 3.56 | 30 |
| Porfi Altamirano | 31 | 2 | 3 | 0 | 3.70 | 24 |
| Sid Monge | 14 | 3 | 0 | 0 | 6.94 | 7 |
| Larry Andersen | 17 | 1 | 0 | 0 | 2.39 | 14 |
| Ed Farmer | 12 | 0 | 6 | 0 | 6.08 | 16 |
| Don Carman | 1 | 0 | 0 | 1 | 0.00 | 0 |

== Post-season ==
The Phillies post-season roster had nine players 30 years of age or over and three rookies, Charlie Hudson, Kevin Gross, and Juan Samuel. The Dodgers entered the series as favorites after winning 11 of 12 games against the Phillies in the regular season. The Dodgers had shut out the Phillies five times, allowed only 15 runs total, and held Phillies hitters to a .187 batting average.

=== National League Championship Series ===
Los Angeles Dodgers vs. Philadelphia Phillies

Phillies win the Series, 3–1

| Game | Score | Date | Location | Attendance |
|---|---|---|---|---|
| 1 | **Philadelphia** – 1, Los Angeles – 0 | October 4 | Dodger Stadium | 49,963 |
| 2 | Philadelphia – 1, **Los Angeles** – 4 | October 5 | Dodger Stadium | 55,967 |
| 3 | Los Angeles – 2, **Philadelphia** – 7 | October 7 | Veterans Stadium | 53,490 |
| 4 | Los Angeles – 2, **Philadelphia** – 7 | October 8 | Veterans Stadium | 64,494 |

=== Postseason game log ===
Legend
| | Phillies win |
| | Phillies loss |
| | Postponement |
| **Bold** | Phillies team member |

1983 Postseason Game Log: 4–5 (Home: 2–3; Away: 2–2)
NL Championship Series: vs. Los Angeles Dodgers: 3–1 (Home: 2–0; Away: 1–1)

| # | Date | Time (ET) | Opponent | Score | Win | Loss | Save | Time of Game | Attendance | Series | Box/ Streak |
|---|---|---|---|---|---|---|---|---|---|---|---|
| 1 | October 4 | | @ Dodgers | 1–0 | **Steve Carlton** (1–0) | Jerry Reuss (0–1) | **Al Holland** (1) | | 49,963 | PHI 1–0 | W1 |
| 2 | October 5 | | @ Dodgers | 1–4 | Fernando Valenzuela (1–0) | **John Denny** (0–1) | Tom Niedenfuer (1) | | 55,967 | TIE 1–1 | L1 |
| 3 | October 7 | | Dodgers | 7–2 | **Charles Hudson** (1–0) | Bob Welch (0–1) | None | | 53,490 | PHI 2–1 | W1 |
| 4 | October 8 | | Dodgers | 7–2 | **Steve Carlton** (2–0) | Jerry Reuss (0–2) | None | | 64,494 | PHI 3–1 | W2 |

World Series: vs. Baltimore Orioles: 1–4 (Home: 0–3; Away: 1–1)

| # | Date | Time (ET) | Opponent | Score | Win | Loss | Save | Time of Game | Attendance | Series | Box/ Streak |
|---|---|---|---|---|---|---|---|---|---|---|---|
| 1 | October 11 | 8:30 p.m. EDT | @ Orioles | 2–1 | **John Denny** (1–1) | Scott McGregor (0–2) | **Al Holland** (2) | 2:22 | 52,204 | PHI 1–0 | W1 |
| 2 | October 12 | 8:20 p.m. EDT | @ Orioles | 1–4 | Mike Boddicker (2–0) | **Charles Hudson** (1–1) | None | 2:27 | 52,132 | TIE 1–1 | L1 |
| 3 | October 14 | 8:30 p.m. EDT | Orioles | 2–3 | Jim Palmer (1–0) | **Steve Carlton** (2–1) | Tippy Martinez (1) | 2:35 | 65,792 | BAL 2–1 | L2 |
| 4 | October 15 | 1:00 p.m. EDT | Orioles | 4–5 | Storm Davis (1–0) | **John Denny** (1–2) | Tippy Martinez (2) | 2:50 | 66,947 | BAL 3–1 | L3 |
| 5 | October 16 | 5:00 p.m. EDT | Orioles | 0–5 | Scott McGregor (1–2) | **Charles Hudson** (1–2) | None | 2:21 | 67,064 | BAL 4–1 | L4 |

=== World Series ===
AL Baltimore Orioles (4) vs. NL Philadelphia Phillies (1)
| Game | Score | Date | Location | Attendance | Time of Game |
|---|---|---|---|---|---|
| 1 | **Phillies – 2**, Orioles – 1 | October 11 | Memorial Stadium (Baltimore) | 52,204 | 2:22 |
| 2 | Phillies – 1, **Orioles – 4** | October 12 | Memorial Stadium (Baltimore) | 52,132 | 2:27 |
| 3 | **Orioles – 3**, Phillies – 2 | October 14 | Veterans Stadium (Philadelphia) | 65,792 | 2:35 |
| 4 | **Orioles – 5**, Phillies – 4 | October 15 | Veterans Stadium (Philadelphia) | 66,947 | 2:50 |
| 5 | **Orioles – 5**, Phillies – 0 | October 16 | Veterans Stadium (Philadelphia) | 67,064 | 2:21 |

== Farm system ==
| Level | Team | League | Manager |
|---|---|---|---|
| AAA | Portland Beavers | Pacific Coast League | John Felske |
| AA | Reading Phillies | Eastern League | Bill Dancy |
| A | Peninsula Pilots | Carolina League | Tony Taylor |
| A | Spartanburg Spinners | South Atlantic League | Roly de Armas |
| A-Short Season | Bend Phillies | Northwest League | Jay Ward |
| Rookie | Helena Phillies | Pioneer League | Ron Smith |

LEAGUE CHAMPIONS: Portland
