= Craig Gerber =

Craig Gerber may refer to:

- Craig Gerber (creator) of Disney animated series
- Craig Gerber (baseball), baseball player
