= Pat Clements =

American baseball player (born 1962)

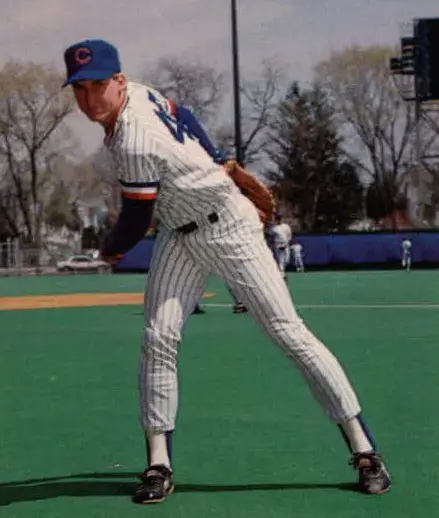
- Clements with the Columbus Clippers c. 1988
- Relief pitcher
- Born: February 2, 1962 (age 64); McCloud, California, U.S.
- Batted: Right Threw: Left

MLB debut
- April 9, 1985, for the California Angels

Last MLB appearance
- September 27, 1992, for the Baltimore Orioles

MLB statistics
- Win–loss record: 17–11
- Earned run average: 3.77
- Strikeouts: 158
- Stats at Baseball Reference

Teams
- California Angels (1985); Pittsburgh Pirates (1985–1986); New York Yankees (1987–1988); San Diego Padres (1989–1992); Baltimore Orioles (1992)
Medals
Men's baseball
Representing the United States
World Games
Gold medal – first place	1981 Santa Clara	Team competition

Patrick Brian Clements (born February 2, 1962) is an American former professional baseball player who played eight seasons for the California Angels, Pittsburgh Pirates, New York Yankees, San Diego Padres, and Baltimore Orioles of Major League Baseball. Clements is a 1980 graduate of Pleasant Valley High School. He played baseball for three seasons at UCLA and was selected to the USA College All-Star team before being drafted by the Angels in June 1983. He was traded along with Mike Brown from the Angels to the Pirates for John Candelaria, George Hendrick and Al Holland on August 2 in a transaction that was completed two weeks later on August 16 when Bob Kipper was sent to Pittsburgh.

He was claimed off waivers by the Orioles from the Padres on July 9, 1992. His first win with the Orioles came in a twelve-inning 3–2 contest over the Chicago White Sox at Comiskey Park on July 20, 1992. After going 2–0 with a 3.28 earned run average (ERA) in 23 games with the Orioles, he elected to become a free agent on November 2, 1992.

Clements resides in Chico, California.
