= Lisa Nehus Saxon =

American sports writer

Lisa Nehus Saxon is an American professional sports writer.

While working for the Daily News of Los Angeles from 1979 until 1987, Saxon became the second woman to cover Major League Baseball as a full-time beat for a daily newspaper, joining Claire Smith, who started at the Hartford Courant a year earlier. While fighting for women to gain equal access to press boxes and locker rooms, Saxon endured both verbal and physical abuse:

At one point the abuse became so horrific that Angels players George Hendrick and John Candelaria stepped in to create a human shield between Saxon and one of her critics, Reggie Jackson. Saxon said she did not go public with much of the abuse, because she feared that doing so would derail the ongoing efforts to allow women to have equal access to the team clubhouses.

Saxon received honors for her work during her journalism career, which spanned four decades. She also worked at the Long Beach Press-Telegram and Riverside Press-Enterprise. In 2001, she began teaching Media, at Santa Monica College and Palisades Charter High School.

Saxon received a bachelor's degree in journalism from California State University, Northridge in 1983 and a graduate degree from Mount St. Mary's University in 2009. She left journalism in 2001 to become an educator. In 2016 and 2017, she was a featured speaker at events sponsored by the Baseball Reliquary. Saxon also appeared in some episodes of "The Sweet Spot, A Treasury of Baseball Stories," an anthology series by Jon Leonoudakis.
