= George Hendrick =

American baseball player and coach (born 1949)

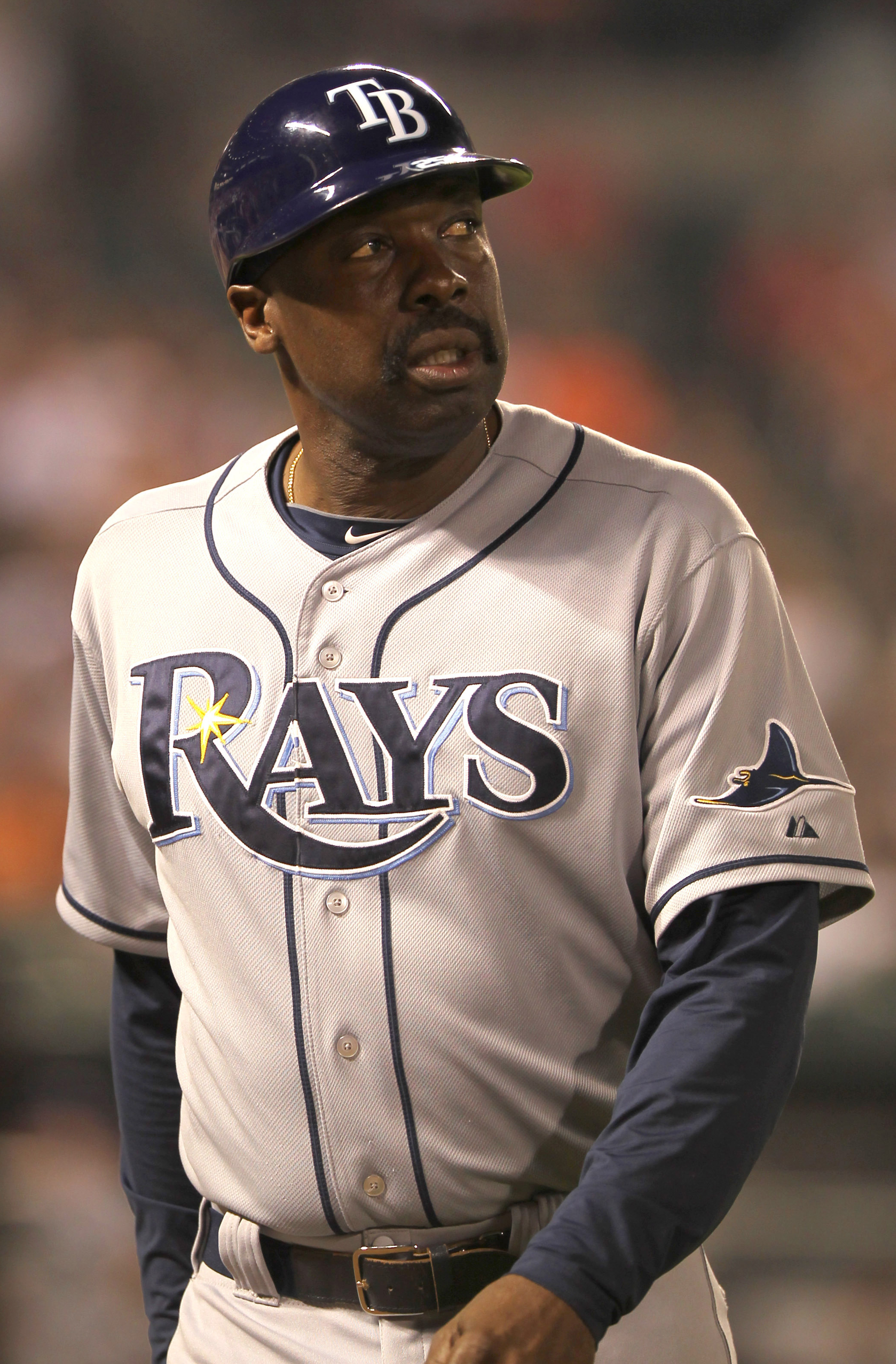
- Hendrick as a coach for the Tampa Bay Rays, 2011
- Outfielder
- Born: October 18, 1949 (age 77); Los Angeles, California, U.S.
- Batted: Right Threw: Right

MLB debut
- June 4, 1971, for the Oakland Athletics

Last MLB appearance
- October 2, 1988, for the California Angels

MLB statistics
- Batting average: .278
- Home runs: 267
- Runs batted in: 1,111
- Stats at Baseball Reference

Teams
- As player: Oakland Athletics (1971–1972); Cleveland Indians (1973–1976); San Diego Padres (1977–1978); St. Louis Cardinals (1978–1984); Pittsburgh Pirates (1985); California Angels (1985–1988); As coach: St. Louis Cardinals (1996–1997); Anaheim Angels (1998–1999); Los Angeles Dodgers (2003); Tampa Bay Devil Rays / Rays (2006–2014)

Career highlights and awards
- 4× All-Star (1974, 1975, 1980, 1983); 2× World Series champion (1972, 1982); 2× Silver Slugger Award (1980, 1983)

George Andrew Hendrick Jr. (born October 18, 1949) is an American former Major League Baseball outfielder and coach. He played between 1971 and 1988, most prominently as an integral member of the St. Louis Cardinals team that won the 1982 World Series. He also won a World Series with the Oakland Athletics in 1972 and was a member of the 1986 California Angels division-winning team. He is currently the special advisor to baseball operations for the Tampa Bay Rays. Hendrick also played for the Gold Coast Suns of the Senior Professional Baseball Association in its 1989 inaugural season.

He was nicknamed "Jogging George" and "Captain Easy" because of his reputation for not running plays out or giving 100% effort and "Silent George" because of his longstanding policy of not talking to the media. Angels beat reporter Lisa Nehus Saxon, one of the first women to cover an MLB team, credited Hendrick for protecting her from Reggie Jackson's harassment and verbal abuse.

== Oakland A's ==
Hendrick was drafted by the Oakland Athletics #1 overall in the January 1968 MLB Draft-Regular Phase. Over three seasons in the A's farm system, Hendricks batted .310 with 27 home runs & 151 runs batted in to earn an invitation to Spring training 1971. He began the season in triple A with the Iowa Oaks, but after clubbing seven home runs and leading the American Association with a .342 average & 32 RBIs, he received a call up to the parent club. He made his major league debut as a pinch hitter for first baseman Mike Epstein in the 11th inning of a 21 inning marathon with the Washington Senators on June 4. He reached on an error by Washington shortstop Toby Harrah in each of his first two at bats. His first major league hit was a 20th inning single off Denny Riddleberger. He would end up splitting the season between Oakland & Iowa, batting .237 with no home runs and eight RBIs at the major league level.

Hendrick's first major league home run was an extra innings game winner off the Chicago White Sox's Steve Kealey on May 28, 1972. His second major league home run was also a game winner the very next day. He spent the season as a fourth outfielder and pinch hitter for the team that took the American League East by 5.5 games over the White Sox. Hendrick batted just .136 with no home runs or RBIs in the post season, but he scored five runs to help the A's capture their first of three consecutive World Series titles. Just prior to the start of the 1973 season, he & Dave Duncan were traded to the Cleveland Indians for Ray Fosse & Jack Heidemann.

== Cleveland Indians ==
As the Indians' starting center fielder, Hendrick slashed .268/.308/.452 with 21 home runs (second on the team to Charlie Spikes with 23) & a team leading .760 OPS in 1973. He had a three home run game against the Detroit Tigers (all off Woody Fryman) on June 19. The following day, he made a 300 foot throw to the plate to nail Jim Northrup at the plate trying to score on a single, and ended the game with a walk-off home run. However, a rift between Hendricks & Indians manager Ken Aspromonte began to form. He was fined $300 for loafing on a single hit to him in center during a six run nineth inning for the California Angels on July 7.

During the off season, Hendrick played winter ball with the Cangrejeros de Santurce club of the Puerto Rico League, where he won the batting title in the 1973−1974 tournament. The added play seemed to help, as he slashed .303/.351/.498 leading into the 1974 All-star break to earn his first All-star selection. He entered the game in the fifth and singled off the New York Mets' Jon Matlack in his first All-star at bat.

Regardless, the rift between him & Aspromonte widened. Hendricks missed several games in August with a hamstring injury. Upon his return, Aspromonte benched him for not running out a ground ball in a 2-1 loss to the White Sox. The rift extended to pitcher Gaylord Perry, who was openly critical of Hendrick in the press and refused to pitch if Hendrick was playing behind him. With a week left in the season, Aspromonte was informed that he would not be returning to the club the following season. The last game of the season Perry pitched. Hendrick left early, not wanting to be in the same line-up.

Things almost got off to a similarly rocky start with new manager Frank Robinson during Spring training. Hendrick was an All-star again in 1975 (.282/.324/.475, 16 HR, 53 RBIs heading into the All-star break). In his only at bat, he again singled off Matlack. He tied Boog Powell for the team lead in RBIs with 86 in 1975, and was second to Rico Carty in 1976 (82), but once again began to fall out of favor with his manager. After the season, he was traded to the San Diego Padres for outfielder Johnny Grubb, catcher Fred Kendall, and infielder Héctor Torres.

== San Diego Padres ==
Hendrick was his team's most valuable player, slashing .311/.381/.492 with 23 home runs & 81 RBIs his first season in San Diego. Regardless, the Padres acquired free agent outfielder Oscar Gamble during the off season and moved Hendrick into more of a reserve role in 1978. Hendrick let it be known he wished to be traded to a team that would play him regularly and was placed on waivers. In need of a power bat, the St. Louis Cardinals, New York Mets & San Francisco Giants all making claims on Hendrick. The Cardinals emerged as the winners, sending pitcher Eric Rasmussen to the Padres in exchange for Hendrick.

== St. Louis Cardinals ==
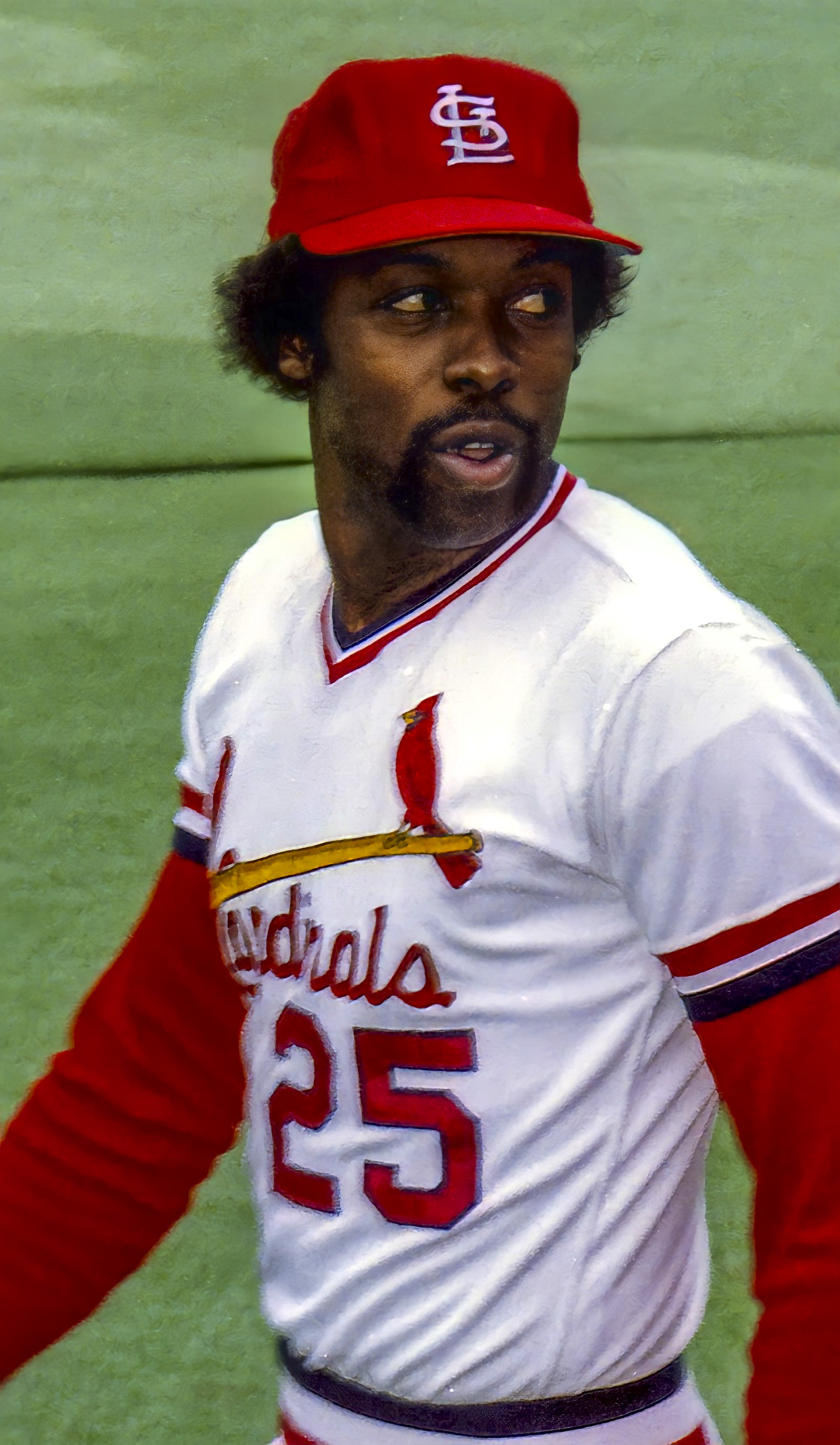
Hendrick with St. Louis Cardinals in 1983

Following a stretch that saw the Cardinals lose 8 of 9 in mid June, Hendrick was batting just .186 as a Cardinal with two home runs & nine RBIs. From there, his bat got hot. He slashed .321/.361/.551 in July, and slashed .351/.403/.631 with eight home runs & 31 RBIs in August. On August 25, he hit two homers and had a career-high seven RBIs in an 11-10 win over the Atlanta Braves. Despite not joining the team until May 26, Hendricks was second on the team with 17 home runs and third in RBIs with 67.

Hendricks slashed .311/.350/.563 with 18 home runs & 65 RBIs through the first half of the 1980 season to earn his third career All-star selection. He singled in the tying run in the sixth inning off the New York Yankees' Tommy John. For the season, he led the Cardinals with a career best 109 RBIs & 25 home runs (tying his career best from 1976).

New manager Whitey Herzog completely overhauled the Cardinals roster when he took on the additional role of General manager on August 26, 1980. Hendricks was one of the few players on the 1980 opening day roster still with the team in 1981. Hendrick rewarded Herzog's faith by clubbing 18 home runs in the strike shortened season, more than double any of his teammates. He also led the team with 61 RBIs. The Cards finished the season with a National League East best 59-43-1 record, however, missed the post season due to the playoff system that was implemented for that season.

They would make the playoffs the following year, with Hendricks again leading his team in home runs (19) & RBIs. (104). In the Cardinals' three game sweep of the Braves in the 1982 National League Championship Series, Hendrick went 4-for-13 with 2 RBIs & 2 runs scored. They faced the Milwaukee Brewers in the World Series, who had received Ted Simmons, Rollie Fingers & Pete Vuckovich in what turned out to be a very lopsided trade when Herzog was cleaning house. Hendrick went 9-for-28 with five runs scored & five RBIs, including the game winning run in the decisive seventh game.

Hendrick slashed .347/.397/.541 with 11 home runs & 58 RBIs in the first half of the 1983 season to have Herzog add him to the National League roster for his fourth & final All-Star Game. Hendrick did not appear in the game.

His numbers dipped in 1984 (.277/.324/.406, 9 HR, 69 RBIs) as he dealt with a thyroid issue that would end his season early. On December 12, the Cardinals traded him and minor league catcher Steve Barnard to the Pittsburgh Pirates for pitcher John Tudor and outfielder Brian Harper.

== Pittsburgh Pirates ==
Hendrick's poor performance (.230/.278/.313 2 HR, 25 RBIs) coupled with his casual style of play made him unpopular with Pirates fans. On August 2, 1985, the 31-64 last place Pirates traded Hendrick and pitchers John Candelaria & Al Holland to the California Angels for Pat Clements, Mike Brown & a player to be named later (Bob Kipper).

== California Angels ==
Hendrick's hitting did not improve upon his arrival in California (.122/.196/.293, 2 HR, 6 RBIs over the remainder of the season). In 1986, he was used in a lefty-righty platoon with Ruppert Jones in right field. On May 4, Hendrick hit a home run off the Brewers' Teddy Higuera. It was his 100th home run in the American League, making him one of the first players to hit 100 home runs in each league.

He & Jones combined for 31 home runs & 96 RBIs (14 & 47 by Hendrick) to help the Angels to their third division title in franchise history. Hendrick homered in the division clinching game. He had just one hit in 12 at bats in the 1986 American League Championship Series against the Boston Red Sox.

A broken finger cost Hendrick nearly two months of the start of the 1987 season. Following a 1988 season in which he slashed .244/.283/.323 with three home runs & 19 RBIs, mostly as a pinch hitter, Hendrick retired.

== Career stats ==
| Games | PA | AB | Runs | Hits | 2B | 3B | HR | RBI | SB | BB | SO | HBP | Avg. | OBP | Slg. | Fld% |
| 2048 | 7834 | 7129 | 941 | 1980 | 343 | 27 | 267 | 1111 | 59 | 567 | 1013 | 22 | .278 | .329 | .446 | .987 |

A two-time Silver Slugger Award winner, Hendrick led the major leagues with 20 outfield assists in 1979 and led the Cardinals in home runs every year from 1980 through 1983. He finished in the top 15 in Major League Baseball Most Valuable Player Award voting four consecutive years between 1980 & 1983.

== Coaching career ==
Hendrick began his coaching career with the Cardinals as a minor league hitting/outfield instructor from 1993 to 1995 before becoming the hitting coach of the big league club from 1996 to 1997. After leaving the Cardinals, he worked as coach at various levels in the California Angels and Los Angeles Dodgers systems from 1998 to 2005. On November 21, 2005, Hendrick was named as a first base/outfield coach for Tampa Bay, a position he held through the end of the 2014 season. He then became Special Advisor to Baseball Operations for the Rays.

== Personal life ==
Hendrick & his wife have seven children. Their son, Brian, played college basketball for the California Golden Bears. Professionally, he has played in Portugal, Belgium, China & Japan.

== See also ==
- List of Major League Baseball career home run leaders
- List of Major League Baseball career runs batted in leaders
- List of St. Louis Cardinals team records
- List of St. Louis Cardinals coaches

Sporting positions
| Preceded by Chris Chambliss | St. Louis Cardinals Hitting Coach; 1996–1997 | Succeeded by Dave Parker |
| Preceded by Dave Parker | Anaheim Angels First-Base Coach; 1998–1999 | Succeeded by Alfredo Griffin |
| Preceded by Jack Clark | Los Angeles Dodgers Hitting Coach; 2003 | Succeeded by Tim Wallach |
| Preceded by Billy Hatcher | Tampa Bay Devil Rays/Rays First-Base Coach; 2006–2014 | Succeeded by Rocco Baldelli |
