= Mike Brown (1980s outfielder) =

American baseball player (born 1959)

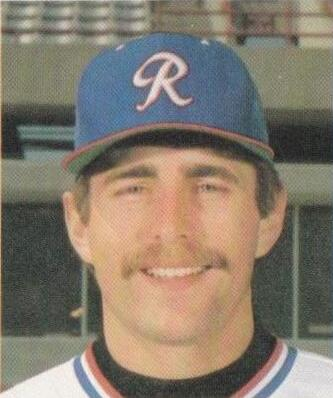
- Brown with the Richmond Braves c. 1987
- Outfielder
- Born: December 29, 1959 (age 66); San Francisco, California, U.S.
- Batted: Right Threw: Right

Professional debut
- MLB: July 21, 1983, for the California Angels
- NPB: April 7, 1990, for the Yomiuri Giants

Last appearance
- MLB: October 2, 1988, for the California Angels
- NPB: October 10, 1990, for the Yomiuri Giants

MLB statistics
- Batting average: .265
- Home runs: 23
- Runs batted in: 113

NPB statistics
- Batting average: .282
- Home runs: 7
- Runs batted in: 29
- Stats at Baseball Reference

Teams
- California Angels (1983–1985); Pittsburgh Pirates (1985–1986); California Angels (1988); Yomiuri Giants (1990)

Michael Charles Brown (born December 29, 1959) is an American former professional baseball outfielder. He played all or parts of five seasons in Major League Baseball (MLB) for the California Angels and Pittsburgh Pirates between 1983 and 1988. He also played one season in Nippon Professional Baseball (NPB) for the Yomiuri Giants in 1990.

== Career ==
Brown was selected by the California Angels in the 7th round of the 1980 Major League Baseball draft. He was 23 years old when he broke into the big leagues with the Angels on July 21, 1983. He was traded along with Pat Clements from the Angels to the Pirates for John Candelaria, George Hendrick and Al Holland on August 2 in a transaction that was completed two weeks later on August 16 when Bob Kipper was sent to Pittsburgh.

In 315 games over five seasons, Brown posted a .265 batting average (239-for-903) with 105 runs, 23 home runs and 113 RBIs. He finished his major league career with a .964 fielding percentage paying at all three outfield positions.

In 1990, Brown played in the Nippon Professional Baseball for the Yomiuri Giants. In 70 games, he batted .282 with 7 home runs and 29 runs batted in.
