= Al Holland =

American baseball player (1952–2026)

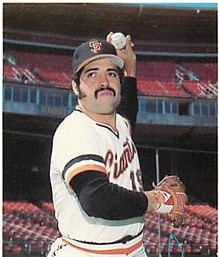
- Pitcher
- Born: August 16, 1952; Roanoke, Virginia, U.S.
- Died: July 4, 2026 (aged 73); Fort Mill, South Carolina, U.S.
- Batted: Right Threw: Left

MLB debut
- September 5, 1977, for the Pittsburgh Pirates

Last MLB appearance
- August 9, 1987, for the New York Yankees

MLB statistics
- Win–loss record: 34–30
- Earned run average: 2.98
- Strikeouts: 513
- Saves: 78
- Stats at Baseball Reference

Teams
- Pittsburgh Pirates (1977); San Francisco Giants (1979–1982); Philadelphia Phillies (1983–1985); Pittsburgh Pirates (1985); California Angels (1985); New York Yankees (1986–1987)

Career highlights and awards
- All-Star (1984); NL Rolaids Relief Man Award (1983)

Alfred Willis Holland (August 16, 1952 – July 4, 2026) was an American professional baseball relief pitcher, who played Major League Baseball (MLB) for the Pittsburgh Pirates, San Francisco Giants, Philadelphia Phillies, California Angels, and New York Yankees, from 1977 to 1987.

== Biography ==
Holland was traded along with Ed Whitson and Fred Breining from the Pirates to the Giants for Bill Madlock, Lenny Randle and Dave Roberts on June 28, 1979. He was acquired along with Joe Morgan by the Phillies from the Giants for Mike Krukow, Mark Davis and minor-league outfielder C.L. Penigar on December 14, 1982. It was with the Phillies that he was nicknamed "Mr. T" which was coined by teammate Ed Farmer.

He finished seventh in the National League Rookie of the Year voting for 1980 but his best season was with the Philadelphia Phillies in 1983 when he won the Rolaids Relief Man of the Year Award and TSN Fireman of the Year Award while finishing in the top ten in voting for both the Cy Young Award and National League MVP. He then saved Game 1 of the 1983 National League Championship Series, and struck out three batters in two innings to finish Game 4, clinching the pennant for the Phillies. He also saved Game 1 of the 1983 World Series. In Game 3 of the World Series, Holland was pitching in the seventh inning when an error allowed the go-ahead run to score. Although Holland struck out four batters in the eighth and ninth innings, he and the Phillies lost in the last postseason game of his career. They then lost Games 4 and 5 as well to give the Baltimore Orioles the championship.

In 1984, Holland was selected to his only All-Star Game but did not play. He was involved in a pair of trades during the 1985 campaign. The first one on April 20 had him returning to the Pirates along with minor-league left-handed pitcher Frankie Griffin from the Phillies for Kent Tekulve. Then he was dealt along with John Candelaria and George Hendrick from the Pirates to the Angels for Pat Clements and Mike Brown on August 2 in a transaction that was completed two weeks later on August 16 when Bob Kipper was sent to Pittsburgh. He then hit a low point by being called to testify at the Pittsburgh drug trials. After admitting to cocaine abuse, he was suspended for sixty days of the 1986 season.

Holland's and ten other players' suspensions were reduced to anti-drug donations and community service, but Holland's career was nearly at an end. He was signed as a free agent by the New York Yankees, released by the Yankees, re-signed by the Yankees and then re-released by the Yankees — all in 1986. The Yankees signed him for the third time in 1987 but, after three games, his earned run average (ERA) was at 14.21. Holland was released by the Yankees a third time after the season and his major league career was over.

In 1989, the age 35-and-older Senior Professional Baseball Association began operation in Florida and Holland was a member of both the St. Petersburg Pelicans and St. Lucie Legends. The league folded in December 1990. Since then, Holland spent time as a minor league pitching coach, in 2006 for the Rookie-level Appalachian League's Johnson City Cardinals.

Holland died in Fort Mill, South Carolina, on July 4, 2026, at the age of 73.

== See also ==
- List of sportspeople sanctioned for doping offences
