= Bob Kipper =

American baseball player (born 1964)

- Pitcher
- Born: July 8, 1964 (age 62); Aurora, Illinois, U.S.
- Batted: Right Threw: Left

MLB debut
- April 12, 1985, for the California Angels

Last MLB appearance
- July 27, 1992, for the Minnesota Twins

MLB statistics
- Win–loss record: 27–37
- Earned run average: 4.34
- Strikeouts: 369
- Stats at Baseball Reference

Teams
- California Angels (1985); Pittsburgh Pirates (1985–1991); Minnesota Twins (1992)

Robert Wayne Kipper (born July 8, 1964) is an American professional baseball coach and a former Major League Baseball (MLB) pitcher. He has also spent two terms (all of the 2002 season, and part of the 2015 season) as bullpen coach of MLB's Boston Red Sox.

== Playing career ==
A native of Aurora, Illinois, Kipper, a left-hander, stood 6 feet 2 inches (1.88 m) tall and weighed 200 pounds (91 kg) during his active career. After graduating from Aurora Central Catholic High School, he was selected by the California Angels with the eighth pick in the first round of the 1982 Major League Baseball draft. He had signed to play baseball at Nebraska before his selection. Kipper led the Class A California League in wins (18) and earned run average (2.04) as his league's "pitcher of the year" in 1984. He made his MLB debut with the Angels in April 1985 at age 20, but was ineffective in two games pitched and was returned to the minor leagues.

Kipper was sent from the Angels to the Pirates on August 16, 1985 to complete a trade from two weeks prior on August 2 that also had Pat Clements and Mike Brown coming to Pittsburgh for John Candelaria, George Hendrick and Al Holland. He would pitch in 247 games for the Pirates over all or parts of seven seasons (1985–91)—initially as a starter, but then as a relief specialist—before finishing his MLB career for the Minnesota Twins in 1992.

In his eight-season MLB career, Kipper posted a 27–37 record with a 4.43 ERA and 11 saves in 271 appearances. He allowed 527 hits and 217 bases on balls, with 369 strikeouts, and 562 innings pitched.

== Post-playing career ==
Following his playing retirement, Kipper has worked as a pitching coach in independent league baseball and in the minor leagues. He also spent a full season as major league bullpen coach of the 2002 Boston Red Sox. On August 16, 2015, he was named Boston's interim bullpen coach, part of a chain reaction of moves driven by manager John Farrell's medical leave of absence for treatment of lymphoma. In Farrell's absence, bench coach Torey Lovullo became acting manager and bullpen coach Dana LeVangie became acting bench coach.

A member of the Boston Red Sox organization since 1999, Kipper has coached for their Lowell Spinners (1999), Augusta GreenJackets (2000–01), Greenville Drive (2005–06; 2008–09; 2018–present), Lancaster JetHawks (2007), Portland Sea Dogs (2003–04; 2010–14), and Pawtucket Red Sox (2015–17) affiliates, working with teams from short-season leagues to Triple-A. Since 2018, Kipper has served as pitching coach of the Drive.

Preceded by John Cumberland; Dana LeVangie	Boston Red Sox bullpen coach 2002; 2015 (August 16–October 4)	Succeeded by Euclides Rojas; Dana LeVangie
