= Spartanburg Spinners =

Minor league baseball team in 1983

The Spartanburg Spinners was the name of a minor league baseball team located in Spartanburg, South Carolina in 1983.

The team played in the Class-A South Atlantic League in 1983, as an affiliate of the Philadelphia Phillies. Mike Maddux and Lance McCullers both played for the Spinners. They finished the season with a 72-71 record. Their home stadium was Duncan Park.

Though the Spinners only existed for a single season in Spartanburg, they were actually a continuation of the Spartanburg Phillies, a minor league affiliate of the Philadelphia Phillies from 1963 to 1994. The team changed its name a few times in the 1980s, playing as the Spartanburg Traders in 1981 and 1982, and the Spartanburg Suns in 1984 and 1985. They returned to the Phillies name in 1986 and kept it until their final season in 1994.

In 1995, the team moved to Kannapolis, North Carolina, becoming the Piedmont Phillies. They were replaced within Spartanburg by the Spartanburg Alley Cats, who played fifteen games in the Atlantic Coast League in 1995 before the league folded.
