= Marty Bystrom =

American baseball player (born 1958)

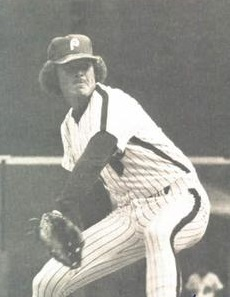
- Pitcher
- Born: July 26, 1958 (age 68); Coral Gables, Florida, U.S.
- Batted: Right Threw: Right

debut
- September 7, 1980, for the Philadelphia Phillies

Last appearance
- September 9, 1985, for the New York Yankees

Career statistics
- Win–loss record: 29–26
- Earned run average: 4.26
- Strikeouts: 258
- Stats at Baseball Reference

Teams
- Philadelphia Phillies (1980–1984); New York Yankees (1984–1985)

Career highlights and awards
- World Series champion (1980)

Martin Eugene Bystrom (born July 26, 1958) is an American former professional baseball pitcher, who played for the Philadelphia Phillies and New York Yankees in Major League Baseball from 1980 to 1985.

== Career ==
Bystrom attended Miami Killian Senior High School and then Miami Dade Community College where he was signed by the Phillies as an amateur free agent in December 1976. At age 22, as a September call-up, he made his MLB debut on September 7, 1980; Bystrom went on to win 5 games (including a complete-game shutout) that September, en route to Philadelphia's National League East Division championship.

Until Dylan Lee's start for the Atlanta Braves in the 2021 World Series, Bystrom set a record in 1980 for fewest regular season appearances (6) before making a start in a World Series.

On June 30, 1984, the Phillies traded Bystrom and Keith Hughes to the New York Yankees for pitcher Shane Rawley. Following the 1985 season, Bystrom elected free agency and re-signed with the Yankees. However, he would never again reach the big leagues, as he finished his career pitching in the farm systems of the Yankees, San Francisco Giants, Phillies, and Cleveland Indians, last playing in 1989. Because the 1994 MLB players' strike also affected 1995 spring training, he attempted a comeback as a replacement player because, "No matter what, there's nothing quite so special as putting on a major-league uniform and playing baseball. I cherish this. I always did."

== See also ==
- List of Major League Baseball replacement players
