= Craig Gerber (baseball) =

American baseball player (born 1959)

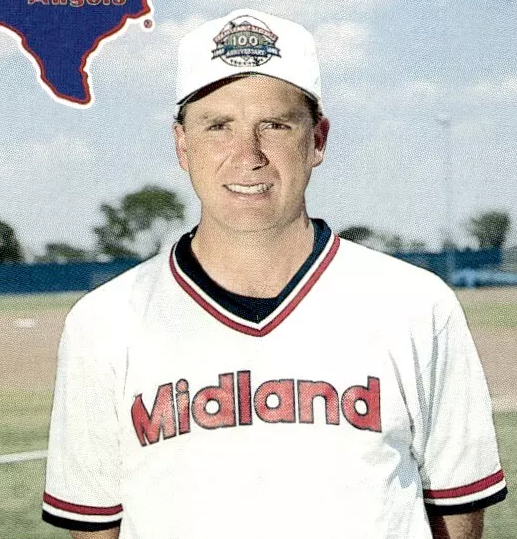
- Gerber with the Midland Angels c. 1988
- Infielder
- Born: January 8, 1959 (age 67); Chicago, Illinois, U.S.
- Batted: Left Threw: Right

MLB debut
- April 11, 1985, for the California Angels

Last MLB appearance
- October 6, 1985, for the California Angels

MLB statistics
- Batting average: .264
- Home runs: 0
- Runs batted in: 6
- Stats at Baseball Reference

Teams
- California Angels (1985)

Craig Stuart Gerber (born January 8, 1959) is an American former professional baseball player who played one season for the California Angels of Major League Baseball (MLB). He was a 20th round draft pick in the 1981 Major League Baseball draft. During his 65 games with the Angels he played in the field at shortstop, second and third base. He hit two home runs in a total of 1,662 minor league at bats.

== Youth and high school ==
Born in Chicago, Illinois, Craig Gerber grew up in San Bernardino, California, where he was a standout in baseball and football. He attended San Bernardino's Cajon High School and was the first Cajon graduate to become a professional athlete. A left-hand hitting, right-handed infielder, Gerber was a three-year varsity starter in baseball, being selected to all-state teams twice and ending his senior season with a .528 batting average. In football, Gerber quarterbacked Cajon's varsity football team for two years, after seeing varsity playing time in his sophomore year. Gerber's arrival would eventually help transform the young school's run-heavy offense into a stronger dual threat, with the new passing element being described at the end of Gerber's senior season as, "the most prolific passing attack in San Bernardino County." Following a 2-7 season, Cajon finished Gerber's junior year at 6-4, and his senior year at 8-3. Cajon's first-ever state playoff berths for football and baseball were in Gerber's junior year - a year that began with Gerber suffering a broken collarbone in its first football game. In his senior year, Gerber received an honorable mention in the Joe Namath National Prep Sports Magazine for 1977, and won Cajon's Ken Hubbs Award (with the overall award going to future Professional Football Hall of Fame player Ronnie Lott).

The Cajon baseball program recognizes exceptional infield play with its annual Craig Gerber Award for Best Infielder.

== College ==
Gerber attended college as a business major at California Polytechnic State University, San Luis Obispo, playing baseball from 1978 to 1981 for coach Berdy Harr and serving as team captain his senior year. Gerber was awarded a full four-year athletic scholarship to Cal Poly SLO, and was the only baseball player his freshman year so awarded, with the rest going to junior college transfer players. Gerber's college years included two seasons (1978 and 1979) with the Clarinda (Iowa) A's summer amateur baseball club, and one year (1981) with the Santa Maria (California) Indians semi-pro baseball team.

A flexible multi-position infielder, Gerber took over the position of shortstop his freshman year at Cal Poly SLO from future Baseball Hall of Fame player Ozzie Smith (who graduated in 1977), was awarded the Robert Mott Award for top freshman baseball player, and was selected all-California Collegiate Athletic Association first team at second base his sophomore year.

Near the end of Gerber's senior year, Harr was quoted saying, "[Gerber has] thrown better, hit better and run better than Ozzie did when he was here. I have as much confidence of Craig being a success in the big leagues as I did of Ozzie when he was leaving."

== Minor leagues ==
Gerber's first stretch in the professional baseball minor leagues included stops in Idaho Falls (Idaho), Redwood City (California), Nashua (New Hampshire), and Edmonton (Alberta, Canada). Gerber's flexibility and dependability in the infield (leading three different minor leagues in fielding at three different infield positions) continued to serve notice for major league attention and consideration as he played regularly at second base, third base and shortstop, and even spent time at catcher and left field. In Redwood City (1981), Gerber set the league record (23) for double plays by a third baseman in a season, a record that stands as of May, 2021. In Edmonton, Gerber was awarded the Rawlings Silver Glove Award for 1984, finishing with the best fielding average (.976) among triple-A shortstops. That same year, however, Gerber's batting was at times inconsistent. At mid-season in Edmonton, when he was hitting just .218, Gerber believed he would need to carry a batting average at least between .280 and .290 to get major league consideration. Edmonton's manager, Moose Stubing, disagreed with Gerber's assessment, calling it "not even close." "If he hits .250, he should get a look. You can carry him with the right club and the right park," Stubing said. Gerber ended the 1984 season with Edmonton with a .230 batting average.

In his 2022 book, "The Book of Joe: Trying Not to Suck at Baseball and Life", Angels organization coach and manager Joe Maddon described an incident that took place in 1981 (when he was managing the Angels single-A affiliate Idaho Falls Angels) and involved Maddon, Gerber, and Angels shortstop Dick Schofield. According to Maddon's account, a "motorcycle gang" would regularly attend home games to heckle players from the first base line fence, and on the first night of the incident the bikers were heckling Schofield for his salary and his play performance. In response, Maddon suggested to Schofield that while warming up at shortstop he should overthrow a ball to first base and hit one of the bikers with it. Maddon described Schofield's response by writing, "Schoey is eighteen years old and is the nicest guy in the world and of course he wouldn't do it." On the second night of the incident the bikers were again heckling Schofield, but Maddon had already asked Gerber to make the warm-up overthrow instead, from his position at second base. Though Gerber's throw was low and hit the chain-link fence in front of the bikers, Maddon believed that, "the message was delivered."

== California Angels ==
Gerber's performance in 1984 earned him a spot in the Angels' spring training camp the following year, aided by the return of Gene Mauch as manager and his style of "small ball". Gerber had followed advice from Stubing's assessment the previous year to become a better bunter, and later described Stubing's work on his hitting saying, "Moose changed me around. He knew I've never struck out a lot [just 29 times in 365 at bats in 1984] and tried to get me to hit the ball on the ground more. If you keep the ball out of the air, some are going to leak through. That can mean as many as 10-15 hits over 140 games." With Stubing as hitting instructor, Gerber hit .290 in instructional league, and .379 in spring training (at one point hitting .435). Among Angels spring training batters, Gerber's average was exceeded only by veteran Bobby Grich at .481. At the start of the 1985 season, Stubing credited Gerber's work in instructional league saying, "His attitude is outstanding. He's always trying to improve [...] If he didn't dedicate himself for the amount of time he did, he wouldn't be here."

Early in spring training, Angels general manager and former director of minor league operations, Mike Port, described Gerber's route to the major leagues by saying, "to grade him out a few years ago in the traditional way - hit, hit with power, run, field, and throw - I'm not sure you'd give him much. But he's learned to do the finer things. He's a good bunter, he knows what he's doing on the bases, he plays all the infield positions well. He's fundamentally sound. That's what will carve out a niche for him."

Of Gerber's offensive skills Mauch said, "Players that have his ability [...] must execute all the things that can win you a game in the late innings. [...] he's not going to walk up there and hit a home run for you. If you can't win a game with a home run, you have to be able to do the little things."

Of Gerber's defensive performance in spring training, Mauch was quoted saying, "you haven't even seen him play second base. Or third base. Or left field. Or right field [...] He's been all over the place. Guys who can play shortstop and quarterback can do a lot of things." Mauch would later add, "Gerber's a bright kid, someone you could put anywhere and have a good feeling that he'd get the job done. He can play short, second, third, even the outfield. We put him out there in the spring, and he caught everything they hit his way."

Los Angeles Dodgers special assignment scout, Mel Didier, described Gerber and the rest of the group of young rookie players at the 1985 Angels spring training camp by saying, “This is the best crop of young players I’ve ever seen in an Angels’ camp. Five or six of them have a real chance.”

The day before Gerber's major league debut, Mauch was quoted speaking personally about Gerber saying, "Being an old shortstop, who played quarterback, I have a soft spot for Craig Gerber. But sometimes a fellow with his makeup gets in the way, if you know what I mean. He's too hard on himself. But I think he's a smart enough young man where that intense desire won't get in his way." Gerber's major league debut came in the third game of the season, in Anaheim on April 11, 1985, against the Minnesota Twins. Gerber entered the game as a pinch runner on second base, in the bottom of the ninth inning with the Angels behind, 3-1. Gerber scored to tie the game in what would turn out to be a 4-3 Angels win in the tenth inning.

Gerber played in 65 games (starting 30) of a full season with the Angels in 1985, finishing with a .264 batting average, a .277 on-base average with only three strikeouts in 97 plate appearances, a .319 slugging average, and a .971 fielding average playing mostly shortstop and third base, with one game at second base.

Along with winning the team's Most Valuable Utility Player award, most notable from Gerber's rookie season is his performance against 1985's eventual American League Cy Young Award winner, World Series MVP, 20-game winner, and fellow Chicago area native, pitcher Bret Saberhagen of the Kansas City Royals. Over eight plate appearances against Saberhagen, Gerber batted 6-for-7 for a .857 batting average, drove in three runs, and scored twice. After grounding out in his first at bat against Saberhagen, Gerber hit safely for the next six, and walked in his last appearance against Saberhagen. In a post-game interview after batting 3-for-3 with a triple and the three RBIs against Saberhagen, Gerber credited the combination of Saberhagen's ability to throw strikes and his own aggressiveness from only playing sporadically for the performance. Gerber stated, "He threw the ball really hard tonight, and I knew he was going to be around the plate. His statistics are just awesome as far as his strikeout-to-walk ratio and things like that. That's good for me because I'm pretty much up there swinging, because I'm not in there every day." Gerber also did well against Toronto Blue Jays pitcher Dave Stieb (found on several lists of the best MLB players not in the Hall of Fame), getting his first major league hit off Stieb on his way to a 3-for-8, .375 batting average performance for the season.

== End of playing career ==
After a spring training seeing little playing time, Gerber did not return to the Angels for the 1986 season. Early speculation on reasons why Gerber might not make the team included the return of veteran infielder Rick Burleson from an injury that made him miss the entire 1985 season, team management's preference for developing younger players, and a possible move to a 24-man roster over the 25-man roster of 1985. In early February before the start of spring training, regarding the possibility of having a preferred solution to the upcoming spring training competition for roster spots, manager Gene Mauch stated that he didn't have such a solution in mind saying, "I'd probably lie about it if I did, because I wouldn't want anyone to think he was counted out." Nevertheless, regarding his situation during spring training, Gerber reported to local press in March that he wasn't being informed on his status and wasn't playing, and that it seemed like Angels management had already "made up their minds" on him. Of Mauch specifically, Gerber said, "He always has a plan in mind. He's probably had this whole spring planned for three months." By the end of March, Mauch may have considered the question of Gerber's spring training time unimportant, stating, "I know what Craig Gerber can do," and adding, "besides that, he has had a sore arm all spring."

At the end of spring training, when asked to respond to a recent question/comment from Angels General Manager Mike Port about the team moving to a 24-man roster ("How often does your 25th man win a game for you?") Angels third baseman Doug DeCinces stated, "If Craig Gerber was our 25th man, he beat Stieb and he beat Saberhagen. I rest my case." Regarding the Angels not returning Gerber for the 1986 season, local sports columnist Gregg Patton would later write, "The only place anyone has ever beat him out was on a piece of paper in someone's office."

Gerber played a limited role at Edmonton in 1986, with a quadriceps injury early in the season, and later a shoulder problem, contributing to him playing in only 74 games. In the offseason, with Gerber positioned between older veteran players with large guaranteed contracts and younger developing players, the Angels kept Gerber on their 40-man roster going into the 1987 season, preventing him from being picked up by another team and allowing the Angels to significantly cut his pay. Gerber asked to be traded or released but the Angels refused (putting Gerber in a position that Patton labeled "infield insurance" for the Angels), and then issued him a suspension notice that would prevent him from playing for any other organization for seven years. After sitting out the 1987 season, Gerber played his final season in baseball in 1988, at AA-level Midland (Texas), describing the experience as, "[...] the most fun I've had in four years [...] I'm enjoying the game for the first time in four years."
