= Tony Ghelfi =

American baseball player

- Starting pitcher
- Born: August 23, 1961 (age 64); La Crosse, Wisconsin, U.S.
- Batted: Right Threw: Right

MLB debut
- September 1, 1983, for the Philadelphia Phillies

Last MLB appearance
- September 13, 1983, for the Philadelphia Phillies

MLB statistics
- Win–loss record: 1–1
- Earned run average: 3.14
- Strikeouts: 14
- Stats at Baseball Reference

Teams
- Philadelphia Phillies (1983)

Anthony Paul Ghelfi (born August 23, 1961), is an American former professional baseball starting pitcher, who played in Major League Baseball (MLB) for the Philadelphia Phillies. Ghelfi was drafted in the first round (14th overall) in the 1980 Major League Baseball draft.

Ghelfi attended La Crosse Central High School in La Crosse, WI. He then went on to Iowa Western Junior College where the Phillies selected him in the first round of the 1980 MLB draft.

Ghelfi played for Philadelphia's big league team for only 2 weeks, in September 1983, enjoying moderate success, in the process.

Ghelfi made his Major League debut, on September 1, 1983, as the starting pitcher when the Phillies hosted the San Francisco Giants. After surrendering a run before recording the game's first out, he settled in and was the winning pitcher, in the Phillies' 4–2 victory, striking out 6, along the way. On September 6, in his second MLB start, Ghelfi pitched 4 1/3 scoreless innings, giving up 5 hits, and striking out 4, as the Phillies went on to beat the New York Mets, 2–0. However, since he did not pitch the requisite 5 innings necessary, in order for the game's starter to be credited with a win, he left with a no-decision. Ghelfi did not fare as well in his third, and final, big league start, on September 13, against the Mets when he surrendered 3 runs, in 5 innings of work. Although he struck out 4, Ghelfi was the losing pitcher, as the Phillies lost 5–1.

Following his brief MLB stint, Ghelfi finished out his professional career in the minor league systems of the Phillies (1984–1985), Cleveland Indians (1987–1988), and San Diego Padres (1989).
