= John Candelaria =

American baseball player (born 1953)

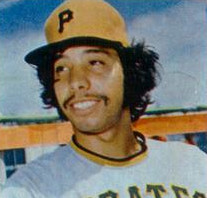
- Pitcher
- Born: November 6, 1953 (age 73); Brooklyn, New York, U.S.
- Batted: Left Threw: Left

MLB debut
- June 8, 1975, for the Pittsburgh Pirates

Last MLB appearance
- July 7, 1993, for the Pittsburgh Pirates

MLB statistics
- Win–loss record: 177–122
- Earned run average: 3.33
- Strikeouts: 1,673
- Stats at Baseball Reference

Teams
- Pittsburgh Pirates (1975–1985); California Angels (1985–1987); New York Mets (1987); New York Yankees (1988–1989); Montreal Expos (1989); Minnesota Twins (1990); Toronto Blue Jays (1990); Los Angeles Dodgers (1991–1992); Pittsburgh Pirates (1993)

Career highlights and awards
- All-Star (1977); World Series champion (1979); MLB ERA leader (1977); Pitched a no-hitter on August 9, 1976

John Robert Candelaria (born November 6, 1953) is a Puerto Rican-American former Major League Baseball pitcher nicknamed "the Candy Man". Mostly remembered as one of the most dominant pitchers in the National League with the Pittsburgh Pirates from 1975 to 1985, he also played for the California Angels, New York Mets, New York Yankees, Montreal Expos, Minnesota Twins, Toronto Blue Jays, and the Los Angeles Dodgers. Candelaria stood 6 feet 7 inches (2.01 m) and wielded a mid- to upper-90s fastball with natural movement.

== Early life ==
Candelaria is the second of four children born to John & Felicia Candelaria in the Flatbush section of Brooklyn, New York. His parents were both born in Puerto Rico and moved to New York as children. They divorced when he was young, and his father moved back to Puerto Rico. He frequently attended New York Yankees games growing up.

Overuse of his pitching arm led Candelaria to leave baseball and focus more on basketball as a sophomore at La Salle Academy. As a senior, he was convinced to return to the mound when he heard that Pirates Manager Danny Murtaugh would be attending a game. Murtaugh was impressed with the one hitter Candelaria threw, prompting the Pirates to draft him in the second round of the 1972 Major League Baseball draft.

== Career ==
Candelaria went 10-2 in his first season of single-A ball at age 19 in 1973. He quickly worked his way through the Pirates' minor league system, going 7-1 with a 1.77 earned run average through the early part of the 1975 season with the triple A Charleston Charlies. He received a call up to the majors in June at just 21 years old when starter Ken Brett went on the disabled list. He made his major league debut on June 8, losing to Ed Halicki & the San Francisco Giants. After a no decision in his next start, he pitched a complete game against future Hall of Famer Tom Seaver & the New York Mets at Shea Stadium in his third start for his first major league victory.

Overall, Candelaria went 8-6 with a 2.76 ERA to help the Pirates capture the National League East his rookie season. With the Pirates already down two games to none to Cincinnati's "Big Red Machine" in the 1975 National League Championship Series, Candelaria was a surprise choice to start game three. He struck out an NL record 14 Reds and carried a 2-1 lead into the eight inning before surrendering a two-run home run to Pete Rose in the eighth. The Reds would go on to win the game 5-3 in extra innings to complete the three game sweep of the NLCS.

After getting off to a relatively slow start to begin the 1976 season (4-4, 3.50 ERA), Candelaria won his next eight decisions in a row, including a no-hitter against the Los Angeles Dodgers on August 9. Overall, he would go 16-7 with a 3.15 ERA, 138 strikeouts & a career best four shutouts.

Candelaria was 10-3 with a 2.71 ERA through the first half of the 1977 season to earn a spot on the 1977 National League All-Star roster. He would not, however, appear in the game. He would be even more dominant in the second half, going 10-2 with a 1.90 ERA to become the Pirates' first twenty game winner since Vern Law in 1960. He would finish fourth in NL Cy Young Award balloting despite an NL best .800 winning percentage & 2.34 ERA.

Becoming the ace of the Pirates staff earned Candelaria the opening day nod for the 1978 season. He responded with a 1-0 shutout of the Chicago Cubs. Things would go south from there, however. He would lose his next four decisions with a 5.61 ERA over that span, as elbow issues hampered him all season.

Candelaria's 1979 season was hampered by a sore back that was worsened by a car accident on July 31. The Pirates were forced to shut him down after his September 16 start despite being in a tight race with the Montreal Expos for the National League East. He would return to the mound for the post season, making thr game one start in the 1979 National League Championship Series against the Cincinnati Reds. He departed after seven with the score tied at two. The Pirates would win in 11.

He faced Scott McGregor in game three of the 1979 World Series against the Baltimore Orioles. After escaping a first & third, nobody out jam in the first and a 1-2-3 second inning, Candelaria surrendered a two run home run to Benny Ayala in the third. The Pirates held a 3-2 lead when a 67 minute rain delay interrupted play. Candelaria was completely ineffective upon his return. After a double, single & error by shortstop Tim Foli loaded the bases with nobody out, light hitting shortstop Kiko Garcia hit a bases clearing triple to chase Candelaria from the game. His final line for the night, six runs (5 earned) in 3+ innings, as the Orioles sailed to a 8-4 victory to take a 2-1 lead in the World Series.

Candelaria was handed the ball again for game six, this time facing future Hall of Famer Jim Palmer. They engaged in a pitchers' duel that lasted six innings before the Pirates opened it up with two runs in the seventh. Kent Tekulve took over from there, combining with Candelaria on a 4–0 shutout ( the first shutout since the 1975 World Series) to tie the series at three. The Pirates would win the seventh game with Tekulve once again closing it out.

Candelaria was moved to the bullpen in 1985. In response to the change, Candelaria called general manager Harding Peterson "a bozo"; he said that the team's ownership valued its racehorses more than its baseball players. He posted nine saves out of the Pittsburgh bullpen, which ended up being a team high on a 57-win team. He was traded along with George Hendrick and Al Holland from the Pirates to the Angels for Pat Clements and Mike Brown on August 2 in a transaction that was completed two weeks later on August 16 when Bob Kipper was sent to Pittsburgh. At the time, he was one of only two Pirates that remained from the 1979 championship team, the other being Don Robinson. The Angels immediately made him a starter again and he went 7–3 down the stretch in 1985 and helped the Angels into the 1986 ALCS with a 10–2 record. Candelaria later said that the trade to a contending team had been a positive change for him.

== Personal life ==
Candelaria married a woman ten years his senior in 1973. That marriage would end in divorce in 1978.

He suffered personal tragedy on Christmas morning 1984, when his 18-month-old son John Jr. fell into the family's swimming pool at their home in Sarasota, Florida. John Jr. spent five weeks in intensive care and was then transitioned to home, where he received nursing care 24 hours per day. He was readmitted to the hospital multiple times and spent 11 months in a coma. John Jr. died in a Pittsburgh hospital on November 14, 1985.

Candelaria and George Hendrick once confronted their Angels teammate Reggie Jackson about his bullying of Lisa Nehus Saxon. Saxon had been one of the first female reporters allowed in baseball locker rooms.

== Career statistics ==
Category	Seasons	W	L	Pct	ERA	G	GS	CG	SHO	SV	IP	H	ER	R	HR	BB	K	WP	HBP	Avg.	SH	Fld%
Total	19	177	122	.592	3.33	600	356	54	13	29	2,525 2/3	2,399	1,038	935	245	592	1.673	28	37	.200	43	.973

Candelaria played for both New York teams (Mets and Yankees), both Los Angeles teams (Dodgers and Angels) and both Canadian teams (Blue Jays and Expos). He finished his career back where it started in Pittsburgh in 1993, making him the only Pirates player from the 1979 team to play for the Pirates during their twenty consecutive losing seasons. Candelaria is the only MLB pitcher to record a win in each of the four Canadian big-league ballparks (Jarry Park, Olympic Stadium, Exhibition Stadium, and SkyDome).

Tommy John remembered that Candelaria would throw strikes on 0-2 pitches, rather than wasting a pitch outside of the strike zone. "He gave up some 0-2 hits, but got more 0-2 outs, and saved his arm some pitches."

== See also ==
- List of Major League Baseball annual ERA leaders
- List of Major League Baseball no-hitters

Preceded by Blue Moon Odom & Francisco Barrios	No-hitter pitcher August 9, 1976	Succeeded by John Montefusco
Preceded by Gorman Thomas	AL Comeback Player of the Year; 1986	Succeeded by Bret Saberhagen
