= 1982 San Francisco Giants season =

1982 San Francisco Giants
- League: National League
- Division: West
- Ballpark: Candlestick Park
- City: San Francisco, California
- Owners: Bob Lurie
- General managers: Tom Haller
- Managers: Frank Robinson
- Television: KTVU (Hank Greenwald, Gary Park)
- Radio: KNBR (Hank Greenwald, David Glass); SP Radio (Tito Fuentes, Enrique Bolanos, Carlos Rivera)

The 1982 San Francisco Giants season was the Giants' 100th season in Major League Baseball, their 25th season in San Francisco since their move from New York following the 1957 season, and their 23rd at Candlestick Park. The team finished in third place in the National League West with an 87–75 record, 2 games behind the Atlanta Braves.

== Offseason ==
- November 14, 1981: Ed Whitson was traded by the Giants to the Cleveland Indians for Duane Kuiper.
- December 9, 1981: Larry Herndon was traded by the Giants to the Detroit Tigers for Dan Schatzeder and Mike Chris.
- December 11, 1981: Jerry Martin was traded by the Giants to the Kansas City Royals for Rich Gale and Bill Laskey.
- February 18, 1982: Dennis Littlejohn was traded by the Giants to the Kansas City Royals for Jeff Cornell.
- March 4, 1982: Enos Cabell and cash was traded by the Giants to the Detroit Tigers for Champ Summers.
- March 30, 1982: Vida Blue and Bob Tufts were traded by the Giants to the Kansas City Royals for Renie Martin, Craig Chamberlain, Atlee Hammaker, and Brad Wellman.
- March 30, 1982: Doyle Alexander was traded by the Giants to the New York Yankees for Andy McGaffigan and Ted Wilborn.

== Regular season ==
- In 1982, the Los Angeles Dodgers and San Francisco Giants were tied for second place, one game behind the Atlanta Braves, as they faced each other in the final three games of the year. The Dodgers won the first two games, 4–0 on Friday and 15–4 on Saturday, to eliminate the Giants, then the Giants knocked the Dodgers out of the pennant race on the season's last day on a 7th-inning, three-run homer by Joe Morgan, winning the game, 5–3. Thus, the Braves finished first by one game. The Giants were 48–52 and 14 games behind the Braves on July 30 but they finished the season with a 39–23 run that put them back in the thick of things.

=== Opening Day starters ===
- Jack Clark
- Chili Davis
- Darrell Evans
- Al Holland
- Johnnie LeMaster
- Jeffrey Leonard
- Milt May
- Joe Morgan
- Reggie Smith

=== Season standings ===
NL West
Team	W	L	Pct.	GB	Home	Road
Atlanta Braves	89	73	.549	—	42‍–‍39	47‍–‍34
Los Angeles Dodgers	88	74	.543	1	43‍–‍38	45‍–‍36
San Francisco Giants	87	75	.537	2	45‍–‍36	42‍–‍39
San Diego Padres	81	81	.500	8	43‍–‍38	38‍–‍43
Houston Astros	77	85	.475	12	43‍–‍38	34‍–‍47
Cincinnati Reds	61	101	.377	28	33‍–‍48	28‍–‍53

=== Record vs. opponents ===
1982 National League record Sources:
Team	ATL	CHC	CIN	HOU	LAD	MON	NYM	PHI	PIT	SD	SF	STL
Atlanta	—	8–4	14–4	10–8	7–11	5–7	9–3	6–6	4–8	11–7	8–10	7–5
Chicago	4–8	—	6–6	9–3	5–7	6–12	9–9	9–9	9–9	4–8	6–6	6–12
Cincinnati	4–14	6–6	—	7–11	7–11	4–8	7–5	5–7	4–8	6–12	6–12	5–7
Houston	8–10	3–9	11–7	—	7–11	4–8	8–4	7–5	9–3	9–9	5–13	6–6
Los Angeles	11–7	7–5	11–7	11–7	—	8–4	6–6	4–8	5–7	9–9	9–9	7–5
Montreal	7–5	12–6	8–4	8–4	4–8	—	11–7	8–10	7–11	7–5	4–8	10–8
New York	3–9	9–9	5–7	4–8	6–6	7–11	—	7–11	8–10	6–6	4–8	6–12
Philadelphia	6-6	9–9	7–5	5–7	8–4	10–8	11–7	—	9–9	7–5	10–2	7–11
Pittsburgh	8–4	9–9	8–4	3–9	7–5	11–7	10–8	9–9	—	6–6	6–6	7–11
San Diego	7–11	8–4	12–6	9–9	9–9	5–7	6–6	5–7	6–6	—	10–8	4–8
San Francisco	10–8	6–6	12–6	13–5	9–9	8–4	8–4	2–10	6–6	8–10	—	5–7
St. Louis	5–7	12–6	7–5	6–6	5–7	8–10	12–6	11–7	11–7	8–4	7–5	—

=== Notable transactions ===
- June 7, 1982: 1982 Major League Baseball draft
  - Steve Stanicek was drafted by the Giants in the first round (11th pick).
  - Barry Bonds was drafted by the Giants in the second round, but did not sign.
  - Randy Bockus was drafted by the Giants in the 34th round of the 1982 amateur draft.
- June 14, 1982: Pat Larkin was signed as an amateur free agent by the Giants.
- June 15, 1982: Dan Schatzeder was purchased from the Giants by the Montreal Expos.

=== Roster ===
1982 San Francisco Giants
Roster
Pitchers: 33 Jim Barr; 48 Fred Breining; 31 Mike Chris; 40 Mark Dempsey; 29 Alan Fowlkes; 32 Rich Gale; 43 Scott Garrelts; 17 Atlee Hammaker; 19 Al Holland; 45 Bill Laskey; 46 Gary Lavelle; 39 Renie Martin; 28 Andy McGaffigan; 38 Greg Minton; 36 Dan Schatzeder	Catchers: 15 Bob Brenly; 7 Milt May; 25 Ron Pruitt; 3 Jeff Ransom; Infielders: 23 José Barrios; 16 Dave Bergman; 41 Darrell Evans; 18 Duane Kuiper; 10 Johnnie LeMaster; 8 Joe Morgan; 35 Tom O'Malley; 2 Joe Pettini; 14 Reggie Smith; 21 Guy Sularz; 36 Brad Wellman	Outfielders: 22 Jack Clark; 30 Chili Davis; 26 Jeffrey Leonard; 3 John Rabb; 6 Champ Summers; 49 Max Venable; 1 Jim Wohlford	Manager: 20 Frank Robinson; Coaches: 9 Don Buford (first base); 12 Jim Davenport (third base); 5 Jim Lefebvre (hitting); 47 Don McMahon (pitching); 42 John VanOrnum (bullpen)

== Player stats ==
= Indicates team leader

=== Batting ===
==== Starters by position ====
Note: Pos = Position; G = Games played; AB = At bats; R = Runs; H = Hits; 2B = Doubles; 3B = Triples; HR = Home runs; RBI = Runs batted in; Avg. = Batting average; SB = Stolen bases

Pos	Player	G	AB	R	H	2B	3B	Avg.	HR	RBI	SB
C	Milt May	114	395	29	104	19	0	.263	9	39	0
1B	Reggie Smith	106	349	51	99	11	0	.284	18	56	7
2B	Joe Morgan	134	463	68	134	19	4	.289	14	61	24
3B	Tom O'Malley	92	291	26	80	12	4	.275	2	27	0
SS	Johnnie LeMaster	130	436	34	94	14	1	.216	2	30	30
LF	Jeffrey Leonard	80	278	32	72	16	1	.259	9	49	18
CF	Chili Davis	154	641	86	167	27	6	.261	19	76	24
RF	Jack Clark	157	563	90	154	30	3	.274	27	103	6

==== Other batters ====
Note: G = Games played; AB = At bats; R = Runs; H = Hits; Avg. = Batting average; HR = Home runs; RBI = Runs batted in; SB = Stolen bases

Player	G	AB	R	H	Avg.	HR	RBI	SB
Darrell Evans	141	465	64	119	.256	16	61	5
Jim Wohlford	97	250	37	64	.256	2	25	8
Duane Kuiper	107	218	26	61	.280	0	17	2
Bob Brenly	65	180	26	51	.283	4	15	6
Champ Summers	70	125	15	31	.248	4	19	0
Max Venable	71	125	17	28	.224	1	7	9
Dave Bergman	100	121	22	33	.273	4	14	3
Guy Sularz	63	101	15	23	.228	1	7	3
Jeff Ransom	15	44	5	7	.159	0	3	0
Joe Pettini	29	39	5	8	.205	0	2	0
José Barrios	10	19	2	3	.158	0	0	0
Ron Pruitt	5	4	1	2	.500	0	2	0
Brad Wellman	6	4	1	1	.250	0	0	0
John Rabb	2	2	0	1	.500	0	0	0

=== Pitching ===
==== Starting pitchers ====
Note: G = Games pitched; CG = Complete games; IP = Innings pitched; W = Wins; L = Losses; ERA = Earned run average; SO = Strikeouts

Player	G	CG	IP	W	L	ERA	SO
Bill Laskey	32	7	189.1	13	12	3.14	88
Rich Gale	33	2	170.1	7	14	4.23	102
Atlee Hammaker	29	4	175.0	12	8	4.11	102
Renie Martin	29	1	141.1	7	10	4.65	63
Alan Fowlkes	21	1	85.0	4	2	5.19	50

==== Other pitchers ====
Note: G = Games pitched; IP = Innings pitched; W = Wins; L = Losses; ERA = Earned run average; SO = Strikeouts

Player	G	IP	W	L	ERA	SO
Fred Breining	54	143.1	11	6	3.08	98
Jim Barr	53	128.2	4	3	3.29	36
Dan Schatzeder	13	33.1	1	4	7.29	18
Mike Chris	9	26.0	0	2	4.85	10
Mark Dempsey	3	5.2	0	0	7.94	4

==== Relief pitchers ====
Note: G = Games pitched; IP = Innings pitched; W = Wins; L = Losses; SV = Saves; ERA = Earned run average; SO = Strikeouts

Player	G	IP	W	L	SV	ERA	SO
Greg Minton	78	123.0	10	4	30	1.83	58
Gary Lavelle	68	104.2	10	7	8	2.67	76
Al Holland	58	129.2	7	3	5	3.33	97
Andy McGaffigan	4	8.0	1	0	0	0.00	4
Scott Garrelts	1	2.0	0	0	0	13.50	4

== Awards and honors ==
- 1982 Joe Morgan 2B, Willie Mac Award

All-Star Game

- Greg Minton, Pitcher, Rreserve

== Farm system ==
Level	Team	League	Manager
AAA	Phoenix Giants	Pacific Coast League	Rocky Bridges
AA	Shreveport Captains	Texas League	Jack Mull
A	Fresno Giants	California League	Jim Maloney
A	Clinton Giants	Midwest League	Wendell Kim
Rookie	Great Falls Giants	Pioneer League	Ernie Rodriguez
