= 1969 California League season =

- League: California League
- Sport: Baseball
- Duration: April 18 – September 3
- Games: 140
- Teams: 8

Regular season
- League champions: Stockton Ports
- Season MVP: Junior Kennedy, Stockton Ports

Playoffs
- League champions: Stockton Ports
- Runners-up: Visalia Mets

CALL seasons
- ← 1968 1970 →

The 1969 California League was a Class A baseball season played between April 18 and September 3. Eight teams played a 140-game schedule, as the winner of each half of the season qualified for the California League championship round.

The Stockton Ports won the California League championship, as they defeated the Visalia Mets in the final round of the playoffs.

== Team changes ==
- The Lodi Crushers ended their affiliation with the Chicago Cubs and began a new affiliation with the Oakland Athletics.

== Teams ==
1969 California League
Team	City	MLB Affiliate	Stadium
Bakersfield Dodgers	Bakersfield, California	Los Angeles Dodgers	Sam Lynn Ballpark
Fresno Giants	Fresno, California	San Francisco Giants	John Euless Park
Lodi Crushers	Lodi, California	Oakland Athletics	Lawrence Park
Modesto Reds	Modesto, California	St. Louis Cardinals	Del Webb Field
Reno Silver Sox	Reno, Nevada	Cleveland Indians	Moana Stadium
San Jose Bees	San Jose, California	California Angels	San Jose Municipal Stadium
Stockton Ports	Stockton, California	Baltimore Orioles	Billy Hebert Field
Visalia Mets	Visalia, California	New York Mets	Recreation Park

== Map of teams ==
California League Teams

== Regular season ==
=== Summary ===
- The Stockton Ports finished with the best record in the regular season for the first time since 1965.

=== Standings ===
California League
Team	Win	Loss	%	GB
Stockton Ports	81	59	.579	–
Visalia Mets	80	60	.571	1
Fresno Giants	72	68	.514	9
Reno Silver Sox	72	68	.514	9
San Jose Bees	68	72	.486	13
Bakersfield Dodgers	67	73	.479	14
Modesto Reds	63	77	.450	18
Lodi Crushers	57	83	.407	24

== League Leaders ==
=== Batting leaders ===
Stat	Player	Total
AVG	Mike Carruthers, Reno Silver Sox	.353
H	Carlos Castanon, Fresno Giants	162
R	Edward Southard, Reno Silver Sox	93
2B	Ron Shelton, Stockton Ports	29
3B	Ronald Pietila, Reno Silver Sox	10
HR	Ernest Davis, Modesto Reds	27
RBI	Paul Alderete, San Jose Bees	93
SB	Albert Holland, San Jose Bees	32

=== Pitching leaders ===
Stat	Player	Total
W	Bill Kirkpatrick, Stockton Ports	16
ERA	Bill Kirkpatrick, Stockton Ports	1.96
CG	Bill Kirkpatrick, Stockton Ports	14
SHO	Bill Kirkpatrick, Stockton Ports	7
SV	Terry Wilshusen, Stockton Ports	21
IP	Bill Kirkpatrick, Stockton Ports	211.0
SO	Ronald Zuber, Reno Silver Sox	230

== Playoffs ==
- The Stockton Ports won their fifth California League championship, defeating the Visalia Mets in three games.

=== Playoff bracket ===
Finals
1	Stockton	2
2	Visalia	1

== Awards ==
California League awards
Award name	Recipient
Most Valuable Player	Junior Kennedy, Stockton Ports

== See also ==
- 1969 Major League Baseball season
