= 1972 California League season =

- League: California League
- Sport: Baseball
- Duration: April 14 – August 31
- Games: 140
- Teams: 8

Regular season
- League champions: Bakersfield Dodgers
- Season MVP: Skip James, Fresno Giants

Playoffs
- League champions: Modesto Reds
- Runners-up: Bakersfield Dodgers

CALL seasons
- ← 1971 1973 →

The 1972 California League was a Class A baseball season played between April 14 and August 31. Eight teams played a 140-game schedule, as the winner of each half of the season qualified for the California League championship round.

The Modesto Reds won the California League championship, as they defeated the Bakersfield Dodgers in the final round of the playoffs.

== Team changes ==
- The Lodi Padres ended their affiliation with the San Diego Padres and began a new affiliation with the Baltimore Orioles. The club was renamed to the Lodi Orions.
- The Stockton Ports ended their affiliation with the Baltimore Orioles and began a new affiliation with the California Angels.

== Teams ==
1972 California League
Team	City	MLB Affiliate	Stadium
Bakersfield Dodgers	Bakersfield, California	Los Angeles Dodgers	Sam Lynn Ballpark
Fresno Giants	Fresno, California	San Francisco Giants	John Euless Park
Lodi Orions	Lodi, California	Baltimore Orioles	Lawrence Park
Modesto Reds	Modesto, California	St. Louis Cardinals	Del Webb Field
Reno Silver Sox	Reno, Nevada	Cleveland Indians	Moana Stadium
San Jose Bees	San Jose, California	Kansas City Royals	San Jose Municipal Stadium
Stockton Ports	Stockton, California	California Angels	Billy Hebert Field
Visalia Mets	Visalia, California	New York Mets	Recreation Park

== Map of teams ==
California League Teams

== Regular season ==
=== Summary ===
- The Bakersfield Dodgers finished with the best record in the regular season for the first time since 1970.

=== Standings ===
California League
Team	Win	Loss	%	GB
Bakersfield Dodgers	88	52	.629	–
Modesto Reds	76	63	.547	11.5
San Jose Bees	76	64	.543	12
Fresno Giants	74	64	.536	13
Visalia Mets	73	67	.521	15
Lodi Orions	67	73	.479	21
Stockton Ports	52	85	.380	34.5
Reno Silver Sox	50	88	.362	37

== League Leaders ==
=== Batting leaders ===
Stat	Player	Total
AVG	Glenn Monroe, Reno Silver Sox	.349
H	Bob Randall, Bakersfield Dodgers	184
R	Skip James, Fresno Giants	111
2B	Gordon Carter, Fresno Giants	30
3B	Jim Dwyer, Modesto Reds	13
HR	Skip James, Fresno Giants	32
RBI	Skip James, Fresno Giants	123
SB	Bob Bailor, Lodi Orions	63

=== Pitching leaders ===
Stat	Player	Total
W	Rick Nitz, Bakersfield Dodgers	18
ERA	Paul Pelz, San Jose Bees	2.36
CG	John D'Acquisto, Fresno Giants	17
SHO	Michael Browne, Stockton Ports	4
SV	Richard Dorsch, Bakersfield Dodgers	14
IP	Rick Nitz, Bakersfield Dodgers	211.0
SO	John D'Acquisto, Fresno Giants	245

== Playoffs ==
- The Modesto Reds won their fifth California League championship, defeating the Bakersfield Dodgers in two games.

=== Playoff bracket ===
Finals
1	Bakersfield	0
2	Modesto	2

== Awards ==
California League awards
Award name	Recipient
Most Valuable Player	Skip James, Fresno Giants

== See also ==
- 1972 Major League Baseball season
