= 1974 California League season =

- League: California League
- Sport: Baseball
- Duration: April 16 – September 2
- Games: 140
- Teams: 8

Regular season
- League champions: Fresno Giants
- Season MVP: Gary Alexander, Fresno Giants

Playoffs
- League champions: Fresno Giants
- Runners-up: San Jose Bees

CALL seasons
- ← 1973 1975 →

The 1974 California League was a Class A baseball season played between April 16 and September 2. Eight teams played a 140-game schedule, as the winner of each half of the season qualified for the California League championship round.

The Fresno Giants won the California League championship, as they defeated the San Jose Bees in the final round of the playoffs.

== Team changes ==
- The Lodi Lions are renamed to the Lodi Orioles. The club remained affiliated with the Baltimore Orioles.

== Teams ==
1974 California League
| Team | City | MLB Affiliate | Stadium |
| Bakersfield Dodgers | Bakersfield, California | Los Angeles Dodgers | Sam Lynn Ballpark |
| Fresno Giants | Fresno, California | San Francisco Giants | John Euless Park |
| Lodi Orioles | Lodi, California | Baltimore Orioles | Lawrence Park |
| Modesto Reds | Modesto, California | St. Louis Cardinals | Del Webb Field |
| Reno Silver Sox | Reno, Nevada | Cleveland Indians | Moana Stadium |
| Salinas Packers | Salinas, California | California Angels | Salinas Municipal Stadium |
| San Jose Bees | San Jose, California | Kansas City Royals | San Jose Municipal Stadium |
| Visalia Mets | Visalia, California | New York Mets | Recreation Park |

== Map of teams ==
California League Teams

== Regular season ==
=== Summary ===
- The Fresno Giants finished with the best record in the league for the first time since 1964.

=== Standings ===
California League
| Team | Win | Loss | % | GB |
|---|---|---|---|---|
| Fresno Giants | 85 | 55 | .607 | – |
| San Jose Bees | 81 | 59 | .579 | 4 |
| Salinas Packers | 78 | 62 | .557 | 7 |
| Modesto Reds | 68 | 72 | .486 | 17 |
| Bakersfield Dodgers | 65 | 75 | .464 | 20 |
| Lodi Orioles | 61 | 79 | .436 | 24 |
| Reno Silver Sox | 61 | 79 | .436 | 24 |
| Visalia Mets | 61 | 79 | .436 | 24 |

== League Leaders ==
=== Batting leaders ===
| Stat | Player | Total |
|---|---|---|
| AVG | José Báez, Bakersfield Dodgers | .330 |
| H | José Báez, Bakersfield Dodgers | 167 |
| R | Craig Cacek, Visalia Mets | 112 |
| 2B | José Báez, Bakersfield Dodgers | 34 |
| 3B | Buck Darrow, Salinas Packers | 14 |
| HR | Gary Alexander, Fresno Giants | 27 |
| RBI | Jack Clark, Fresno Giants | 117 |
| SB | Sheldon Mallory, San Jose Bees | 72 |

=== Pitching leaders ===
| Stat | Player | Total |
|---|---|---|
| W | Bob Knepper, Fresno Giants | 20 |
| ERA | Lynn McKinney, San Jose Bees | 2.23 |
| CG | Bob Knepper, Fresno Giants; Mike Parrott, Lodi Orioles | 16 |
| SHO | William Rothan, Salinas Packers | 4 |
| SV | Tim Burns, Salinas Packers; Steven Eckert, Visalia Mets; Steve Greenough, Fresno Giants | 8 |
| IP | Bob Knepper, Fresno Giants | 238.0 |
| SO | Bob Knepper, Fresno Giants | 247 |

== Playoffs ==
- The finals were extended from a best-of-three series to a best-of-five series.
- The Fresno Giants won their seventh California League championship, defeating the San Jose Bees in five games.

=== Playoff bracket ===
| Finals |
| 1 | Fresno | 3 |
| 2 | San Jose | 2 |

== Awards ==
California League awards
| Award name | Recipient |
|---|---|
| Most Valuable Player | Gary Alexander, Fresno Giants |

== See also ==
- 1974 Major League Baseball season
