= 1970 California League season =

- League: California League
- Sport: Baseball
- Duration: April 17 – September 2
- Games: 140
- Teams: 8

Regular season
- League champions: Bakersfield Dodgers
- Season MVP: Sonny Johnson, Bakersfield Dodgers

Playoffs
- League champions: Bakersfield Dodgers

CALL seasons
- ← 1969 1971 →

The 1970 California League was a Class A baseball season played between April 17 and September 2. Eight teams played a 140-game schedule, as the winner of each half of the season qualified for the California League championship round.

The Bakersfield Dodgers won the California League championship, as they finished both halves of the season with the top record in the league.

== Team changes ==
- The Lodi Crushers ended their affiliation with the Oakland Athletics and began a new affiliation with the San Diego Padres. The club was renamed to the Lodi Padres.
- The San Jose Bees ended their affiliation with the California Angels and began a new affiliation with the Kansas City Royals.

== Teams ==
1970 California League
Team	City	MLB Affiliate	Stadium
Bakersfield Dodgers	Bakersfield, California	Los Angeles Dodgers	Sam Lynn Ballpark
Fresno Giants	Fresno, California	San Francisco Giants	John Euless Park
Lodi Padres	Lodi, California	San Diego Padres	Lawrence Park
Modesto Reds	Modesto, California	St. Louis Cardinals	Del Webb Field
Reno Silver Sox	Reno, Nevada	Cleveland Indians	Moana Stadium
San Jose Bees	San Jose, California	Kansas City Royals	San Jose Municipal Stadium
Stockton Ports	Stockton, California	Baltimore Orioles	Billy Hebert Field
Visalia Mets	Visalia, California	New York Mets	Recreation Park

== Map of teams ==
California League Teams

== Regular season ==
=== Summary ===
- The Bakersfield Dodgers finished with the best record in the regular season for the first time since 1949.

=== Standings ===
California League
Team	Win	Loss	%	GB
Bakersfield Dodgers	93	46	.669	–
Reno Silver Sox	79	61	.564	14.5
San Jose Bees	77	63	.550	16.5
Modesto Reds	76	64	.543	17.5
Fresno Giants	71	68	.511	22
Visalia Mets	66	74	.471	27.5
Stockton Ports	54	86	.386	39.5
Lodi Padres	43	97	.307	50.5

== League Leaders ==
=== Batting leaders ===
Stat	Player	Total
AVG	Sonny Johnson, Bakersfield Dodgers	.350
H	Jorge Roque, Modesto Reds	165
R	Jorge Roque, Modesto Reds	101
2B	Ed Goodson, Fresno Giants; Sonny Johnson, Bakersfield Dodgers	28
3B	Jerry Bond, Reno Silver Sox	16
HR	Larry Fritz, Visalia Mets	24
RBI	George Greer, Modesto Reds	96
SB	Leon Brown, Stockton Ports	51

=== Pitching leaders ===
Stat	Player	Total
W	Al Dawson, Bakersfield Dodgers	17
ERA	Randy Moffitt, Fresno Giants	1.60
CG	Clint Stark, Modesto Reds	15
SHO	Don Hood, Stockton Ports; Clint Stark, Modesto Reds	5
SV	Steve Kokor, Fresno Giants; Felix Roque, Modesto Reds	12
IP	Clint Stark, Modesto Reds	209.0
SO	Al Dawson, Bakersfield Dodgers	244

== Playoffs ==
- There were no playoffs held, as the Bakersfield Dodgers had the best record in both halves of the season.
- The Bakersfield Dodgers won their first California League championship.

=== Playoff bracket ===
Finals
1	Bakersfield

== Awards ==
California League awards
Award name	Recipient
Most Valuable Player	Sonny Johnson, Bakersfield Dodgers

== See also ==
- 1970 Major League Baseball season
