= 1973 California League season =

- League: California League
- Sport: Baseball
- Duration: April 13 – August 29
- Games: 140
- Teams: 8

Regular season
- League champions: Lodi Lions; Salinas Packers
- Season MVP: John Balaz, Salinas Packers

Playoffs
- League champions: Lodi Lions
- Runners-up: Bakersfield Dodgers

CALL seasons
- ← 1972 1974 →

The 1973 California League was a Class A baseball season played between April 13 and August 29. Eight teams played a 140-game schedule, as the winner of each half of the season qualified for the California League championship round.

The Lodi Lions won the California League championship, as they defeated the Bakersfield Dodgers in the final round of the playoffs.

== Team changes ==
- The Stockton Ports relocated to Salinas, California and were renamed to the Salinas Packers. The club remained affiliated with the California Angels.
- The Lodi Orions are renamed to the Lodi Lions. The club remained affiliated with the Baltimore Orioles.

== Teams ==
1973 California League
Team	City	MLB Affiliate	Stadium
Bakersfield Dodgers	Bakersfield, California	Los Angeles Dodgers	Sam Lynn Ballpark
Fresno Giants	Fresno, California	San Francisco Giants	John Euless Park
Lodi Lions	Lodi, California	Baltimore Orioles	Lawrence Park
Modesto Reds	Modesto, California	St. Louis Cardinals	Del Webb Field
Reno Silver Sox	Reno, Nevada	Cleveland Indians	Moana Stadium
Salinas Packers	Salinas, California	California Angels	Salinas Municipal Stadium
San Jose Bees	San Jose, California	Kansas City Royals	San Jose Municipal Stadium
Visalia Mets	Visalia, California	New York Mets	Recreation Park

== Map of teams ==
California League Teams

== Regular season ==
=== Summary ===
- The Lodi Lions and Salinas Packers finished with the best records in the league.
- Despite finishing tied for first place, the Salinas Packers did not qualify for the post-season due to not finishing in first place in either half of the season.
- The Lodi Lions finished with the best record in the regular season for the first time in team history.
- The Salinas Packers finished with the best record in the regular season for the first time in team history.

=== Standings ===
California League
Team	Win	Loss	%	GB
Lodi Lions	77	63	.550	–
Salinas Packers	77	63	.550	–
San Jose Bees	75	65	.536	2
Bakersfield Dodgers	70	70	.500	7
Reno Silver Sox	70	70	.500	7
Fresno Giants	69	71	.493	14
Visalia Mets	62	78	.443	15
Modesto Reds	60	80	.429	11.5

== League Leaders ==
=== Batting leaders ===
Stat	Player	Total
AVG	Dave Cripe, San Jose Bees	.310
H	Mike Eden, Fresno Giants	159
R	Rick Manning, Reno Silver Sox	101
2B	Tim Steele, Bakersfield Dodgers; Mike Vail, Modesto Reds	31
3B	Rick Manning, Reno Silver Sox	14
HR	John Balaz, Salinas Packers	28
RBI	John Balaz, Salinas Packers	113
SB	Kenzie Davis, San Jose Bees	82

=== Pitching leaders ===
Stat	Player	Total
W	Dennis Leonard, San Jose Bees	15
ERA	Curtis Isom, San Jose Bees	2.42
CG	Dennis Leonard, San Jose Bees; Larry McCall, Lodi Lions	16
SHO	Dennis Eckersley, Reno Silver Sox; Dennis Leonard, San Jose Bees	5
SV	Dave Heaverlo, Fresno Giants	17
IP	Curtis Isom, San Jose Bees	208.0
SO	Curtis Isom, San Jose Bees	227

== Playoffs ==
- The Lodi Lions won their first California League championship, defeating the Bakersfield Dodgers in two games.

=== Playoff bracket ===
Finals
1	Lodi	2
2	Bakersfield	0

== Awards ==
California League awards
Award name	Recipient
Most Valuable Player	John Balaz, Salinas Packers

== See also ==
- 1973 Major League Baseball season
