= 1971 California League season =

- League: California League
- Sport: Baseball
- Duration: April 16 – September 1
- Games: 140
- Teams: 8

Regular season
- League champions: Modesto Reds
- Season MVP: George Theodore, Visalia Mets

Playoffs
- League champions: Visalia Mets
- Runners-up: Fresno Giants

CALL seasons
- ← 1970 1972 →

The 1971 California League was a Class A baseball season played between April 16 and September 1. Eight teams played a 140-game schedule, as the winner of each half of the season qualified for the California League championship round.

The Visalia Mets won the California League championship, as they defeated the Fresno Giants in the final round of the playoffs.

== Teams ==
1971 California League
| Team | City | MLB Affiliate | Stadium |
| Bakersfield Dodgers | Bakersfield, California | Los Angeles Dodgers | Sam Lynn Ballpark |
| Fresno Giants | Fresno, California | San Francisco Giants | John Euless Park |
| Lodi Padres | Lodi, California | San Diego Padres | Lawrence Park |
| Modesto Reds | Modesto, California | St. Louis Cardinals | Del Webb Field |
| Reno Silver Sox | Reno, Nevada | Cleveland Indians | Moana Stadium |
| San Jose Bees | San Jose, California | Kansas City Royals | San Jose Municipal Stadium |
| Stockton Ports | Stockton, California | Baltimore Orioles | Billy Hebert Field |
| Visalia Mets | Visalia, California | New York Mets | Recreation Park |

== Map of teams ==
California League Teams

== Regular season ==
=== Summary ===
- The Modesto Reds finished with the best record in the regular season for the first time since 1966.
- Despite finishing with the best record in the league, the Modesto Reds failed to qualify for the post-season, as they did not finish in first place in either half of the season.

=== Standings ===
California League
| Team | Win | Loss | % | GB |
|---|---|---|---|---|
| Modesto Reds | 83 | 56 | .597 | – |
| Visalia Mets | 81 | 58 | .583 | 2 |
| Fresno Giants | 70 | 70 | .500 | 13.5 |
| San Jose Bees | 70 | 70 | .500 | 13.5 |
| Stockton Ports | 67 | 71 | .486 | 15.5 |
| Lodi Padres | 65 | 74 | .468 | 18 |
| Reno Silver Sox | 64 | 75 | .460 | 19 |
| Bakersfield Dodgers | 56 | 82 | .406 | 26.5 |

== League Leaders ==
=== Batting leaders ===
| Stat | Player | Total |
|---|---|---|
| AVG | Bill Bright, Modesto Reds | .340 |
| H | Bill Flowers, Reno Silver Sox | 175 |
| R | Bill Flowers, Reno Silver Sox | 113 |
| 2B | Steve Ontiveros, Fresno Giants | 33 |
| 3B | Steve Ontiveros, Fresno Giants | 10 |
| HR | Frank Ortenzio, San Jose Bees | 32 |
| RBI | George Theodore, Visalia Mets | 113 |
| SB | Bill Flowers, Reno Silver Sox | 57 |

=== Pitching leaders ===
| Stat | Player | Total |
|---|---|---|
| W | Doug Bird, San Jose Bees | 15 |
| ERA | Don Durham, Modesto Reds | 2.80 |
| CG | Ralph Garcia, Lodi Padres | 11 |
| SHO | Doug Bird, San Jose Bees; Don Durham, Modesto Reds; Ralph Garcia, Lodi Padres | 3 |
| SV | David Hansen, Modesto Reds | 21 |
| IP | Doug Bird, San Jose Bees | 182.0 |
| SO | Don Durham, Modesto Reds | 202 |

== Playoffs ==
- The Visalia Mets won their first California League championship, defeating the Fresno Giants in two games.

=== Playoff bracket ===
| Finals |
| 1 | Fresno | 0 |
| 2 | Visalia | 2 |

== Awards ==
California League awards
| Award name | Recipient |
|---|---|
| Most Valuable Player | George Theodore, Visalia Mets |

== See also ==
- 1971 Major League Baseball season
