= 1966 California League season =

- League: California League
- Sport: Baseball
- Duration: April 19 – September 5
- Games: 140
- Teams: 8

Regular season
- League champions: Modesto Reds
- Season MVP: Dave Duncan, Modesto Reds

Playoffs
- League champions: Modesto Reds

CALL seasons
- ← 1965 1967 →

The 1966 California League was a Class A baseball season played between April 19 and September 5. Eight teams played a 140-game schedule, as the winner of each half of the season qualified for the California League championship round.

The Modesto Reds won the California League championship, as they had the best record in both halves of the season.

== Team changes ==
- The Modesto Colts returned to the league following a one-year leave of absence. The club was renamed to the Modesto Reds and began an affiliation with the Kansas City Athletics.
- The Reno Silver Sox returned to the league following a one-year leave of absence. The club began an affiliation with the Cleveland Indians.
- The Salinas Indians relocated to Lodi, California and were renamed to the Lodi Crushers. The club ended their affiliation with the Cleveland Indians and began a new affiliation with the Chicago Cubs.

== Teams ==
1966 California League
Team	City	MLB Affiliate	Stadium
Bakersfield Bears	Bakersfield, California	Philadelphia Phillies	Sam Lynn Ballpark
Fresno Giants	Fresno, California	San Francisco Giants	John Euless Park
Lodi Crushers	Lodi, California	Chicago Cubs	Lawrence Park
Modesto Reds	Modesto, California	Kansas City Athletics	Del Webb Field
Reno Silver Sox	Reno, Nevada	Cleveland Indians	Moana Stadium
San Jose Bees	San Jose, California	California Angels	San Jose Municipal Stadium
Santa Barbara Dodgers	Santa Barbara, California	Los Angeles Dodgers	Laguna Ball Park
Stockton Ports	Stockton, California	Baltimore Orioles	Billy Hebert Field

== Map of teams ==
California League Teams

== Regular season ==
=== Summary ===
- The Modesto Reds finished with the best record in the regular season for the first time since 1959.
- The Modesto Reds defeated the San Jose Bees in a tie-breaking game to win the first half of the season.

=== Standings ===
California League
Team	Win	Loss	%	GB
Modesto Reds	88	53	.624	–
San Jose Bees	77	64	.546	11
Fresno Giants	74	66	.529	13.5
Reno Silver Sox	69	71	.493	18.5
Santa Barbara Dodgers	69	71	.493	18.5
Bakersfield Bears	68	72	.486	19.5
Lodi Crushers	59	81	.421	28.5
Stockton Ports	57	83	.407	30.5

== League Leaders ==
=== Batting leaders ===
Stat	Player	Total
AVG	Gail Hopkins, Lodi Crushers	.358
H	Ed Bays, Reno Silver Sox	168
R	Danny Greenfield, Modesto Reds	111
2B	Ed Bays, Reno Silver Sox; Jackie Disher, Fresno Giants	33
3B	Al Gallagher, Fresno Giants	12
HR	Dave Duncan, Modesto Reds	46
RBI	Larry Wilson, Modesto Reds	117
SB	Danny Greenfield, Modesto Reds	42

=== Pitching leaders ===
Stat	Player	Total
W	Richard Armstrong, Santa Barbara Dodgers; Greg Conger, Modesto Reds; John Fouse, Reno Silver Sox	16
ERA	Greg Conger, Modesto Reds	2.73
CG	Tim Sommer, Stockton Ports	15
SHO	Robert Barisoff, Santa Barbara Dodgers	5
IP	Tim Sommer, Stockton Ports	226.0
SO	Richard Armstrong, Santa Barbara Dodgers	186

== Playoffs ==
- There were no playoffs held, as the Modesto Reds had the best record in both halves of the season.
- The Modesto Reds won their fourth California League championship.

=== Playoff bracket ===
Finals
1	Modesto

== Awards ==
California League awards
Award name	Recipient
Most Valuable Player	Dave Duncan, Modesto Reds

== See also ==
- 1966 Major League Baseball season
