= 1968 California League season =

- League: California League
- Sport: Baseball
- Duration: April 19 – September 4
- Games: 140
- Teams: 8

Regular season
- League champions: San Jose Bees
- Season MVP: Ted Simmons, Modesto Reds

Playoffs
- League champions: Fresno Giants
- Runners-up: San Jose Bees

CALL seasons
- ← 1967 1969 →

The 1968 California League was a Class A baseball season played between April 19 and September 4. Eight teams played a 140-game schedule, as the winner of each half of the season qualified for the California League championship round.

The Fresno Giants won the California League championship, as they defeated the San Jose Bees in the final round of the playoffs.

== Team changes ==
- The Santa Barbara Dodgers ended their affiliation with the Los Angeles Dodgers and the franchise folded.
- The Visalia White Sox franchise was reactivated and the club began an affiliation with the New York Mets. The club was renamed to the Visalia Mets.
- The Bakersfield Bears ended their affiliation with the Philadelphia Phillies and began a new affiliation with the Los Angeles Dodgers. The club was renamed to the Bakersfield Dodgers.

== Teams ==
1968 California League
Team	City	MLB Affiliate	Stadium
Bakersfield Dodgers	Bakersfield, California	Los Angeles Dodgers	Sam Lynn Ballpark
Fresno Giants	Fresno, California	San Francisco Giants	John Euless Park
Lodi Crushers	Lodi, California	Chicago Cubs	Lawrence Park
Modesto Reds	Modesto, California	St. Louis Cardinals	Del Webb Field
Reno Silver Sox	Reno, Nevada	Cleveland Indians	Moana Stadium
San Jose Bees	San Jose, California	California Angels	San Jose Municipal Stadium
Stockton Ports	Stockton, California	Baltimore Orioles	Billy Hebert Field
Visalia Mets	Visalia, California	New York Mets	Recreation Park

== Map of teams ==
California League Teams

== Regular season ==
=== Summary ===
- The San Jose Bees finished with the best record in the regular season for the second consecutive season.

=== Standings ===
California League
Team	Win	Loss	%	GB
San Jose Bees	80	60	.571	–
Fresno Giants	79	60	.568	0.5
Lodi Crushers	75	65	.536	5
Modesto Reds	69	71	.493	11
Reno Silver Sox	67	72	.482	12.5
Stockton Ports	67	73	.479	13
Bakersfield Dodgers	61	79	.436	19
Visalia Mets	61	79	.436	19

== League Leaders ==
=== Batting leaders ===
Stat	Player	Total
AVG	Ted Simmons, Modesto Reds	.331
H	Joe Patterson, Modesto Reds	169
R	Joe Patterson, Modesto Reds	121
2B	Jack Heidemann, Reno Silver Sox	33
3B	Jack Heidemann, Reno Silver Sox	13
HR	Tom Robson, Visalia Mets	35
RBI	Ted Simmons, Modesto Reds	117
SB	William Reuss, Reno Silver Sox	38

=== Pitching leaders ===
Stat	Player	Total
W	Jophery Brown, Lodi Crushers; James Moyer, Fresno Giants	18
ERA	Tim Griffin, Stockton Ports	2.15
CG	James Moyer, Fresno Giants	19
SHO	Tim Griffin, Stockton Ports; James Moyer, Fresno Giants	4
IP	James Moyer, Fresno Giants	225.0
SO	James Moyer, Fresno Giants	269

== Playoffs ==
- The Fresno Giants won their sixth California League championship, defeating the San Jose Bees in three games.

=== Playoff bracket ===
Finals
1	San Jose	1
2	Fresno	2

== Awards ==
California League awards
Award name	Recipient
Most Valuable Player	Ted Simmons, Modesto Reds

== See also ==
- 1968 Major League Baseball season
