= 1967 California League season =

- League: California League
- Sport: Baseball
- Duration: April 18 – September 4
- Games: 140
- Teams: 8

Regular season
- League champions: San Jose Bees
- Season MVP: Leron Lee, Modesto Reds

Playoffs
- League champions: San Jose Bees
- Runners-up: Modesto Reds

CALL seasons
- ← 1966 1968 →

The 1967 California League was a Class A baseball season played between April 18 and September 4. Eight teams played a 140-game schedule, as the winner of each half of the season qualified for the California League championship round.

The San Jose Bees won the California League championship, as they defeated the Modesto Reds in the final round of the playoffs.

== Team changes ==
- The Modesto Reds ended their affiliation with the Kansas City Athletics and began a new affiliation with the St. Louis Cardinals.

== Teams ==
1967 California League
Team	City	MLB Affiliate	Stadium
Bakersfield Bears	Bakersfield, California	Philadelphia Phillies	Sam Lynn Ballpark
Fresno Giants	Fresno, California	San Francisco Giants	John Euless Park
Lodi Crushers	Lodi, California	Chicago Cubs	Lawrence Park
Modesto Reds	Modesto, California	St. Louis Cardinals	Del Webb Field
Reno Silver Sox	Reno, Nevada	Cleveland Indians	Moana Stadium
San Jose Bees	San Jose, California	California Angels	San Jose Municipal Stadium
Santa Barbara Dodgers	Santa Barbara, California	Los Angeles Dodgers	Laguna Ball Park
Stockton Ports	Stockton, California	Baltimore Orioles	Billy Hebert Field

== Map of teams ==
California League Teams

== Regular season ==
=== Summary ===
- The San Jose Bees finished with the best record in the regular season for the first time since 1962.

=== Standings ===
California League
Team	Win	Loss	%	GB
San Jose Bees	86	52	.623	–
Modesto Reds	79	61	.564	8
Santa Barbara Dodgers	77	63	.550	10
Bakersfield Bears	70	68	.507	16
Fresno Giants	67	72	.482	19.5
Lodi Crushers	63	77	.450	24
Stockton Ports	58	81	.417	28.5
Reno Silver Sox	56	82	.406	30

== League Leaders ==
=== Batting leaders ===
Stat	Player	Total
AVG	Phil Mastagni, Stockton Ports	.308
H	James Mallon, Fresno Giants	159
R	Billy Grabarkewitz, Santa Barbara Dodgers	122
2B	Buddy Hollowell, Santa Barbara Dodgers; Hank McGraw, Lodi Crushers	24
3B	Donald Anderson, Stockton Ports	12
HR	Joe Lis, Bakersfield Bears	33
RBI	Joe Lis, Bakersfield Bears	90
SB	Billy Grabarkewitz, Santa Barbara Dodgers	39

=== Pitching leaders ===
Stat	Player	Total
W	Pat Bayless, Bakersfield Bears	18
ERA	Ken Tatum, San Jose Bees	2.12
CG	Pat Bayless, Bakersfield Bears; Ron Bryant, Fresno Giants	15
SHO	Pat Bayless, Bakersfield Bears	6
IP	Pat Bayless, Bakersfield Bears	219.0
SO	Pat Bayless, Bakersfield Bears	217

== Playoffs ==
- The San Jose Bees won their second California League championship, defeating the Modesto Reds in two games.

=== Playoff bracket ===
Finals
1	San Jose	2
2	Modesto	0

== Awards ==
California League awards
Award name	Recipient
Most Valuable Player	Leron Lee, Modesto Reds

== See also ==
- 1967 Major League Baseball season
