= Wendell Kim =

- Coach
- Born: March 9, 1950; Honolulu, Hawaii, U.S.
- Died: February 15, 2015 (aged 64); Phoenix, Arizona, U.S.
- Batted: Right Threw: Right

Teams
- San Francisco Giants (1989–1996); Boston Red Sox (1997–2000); Montreal Expos (2002); Chicago Cubs (2003–2004)

Wendell Kealohepauloe Kim (March 9, 1950 – February 15, 2015) was an American professional baseball player, coach and manager who served as a coach for four Major League Baseball teams over the course of 15 seasons (1989–2000; 2002–04). A former infielder in the minor leagues, he stood 5 feet 5 inches (1.65 m) tall, weighed 160 pounds (73 kg), and threw and batted right-handed. He was of Korean and Hawaiian descent.

== Early life ==
Kim was born in Honolulu, one of three children of welterweight boxer Phil "Wildcat" Kim, who compiled a 43–15–3 record as a professional fighter, and his wife Doris Caserman. According to Wendell, his father abused both Doris and their children. Phil Kim retired from boxing in 1956, and was shot to death two years later, when Wendell was eight. The crime remains unsolved.

== Playing career ==
Kim played three years of varsity college baseball at California State Polytechnic University, Pomona, where he was selected twice for the All-California Collegiate Athletic Association team. In 1973, he attended an open tryout camp held by the San Francisco Giants, and he impressed the team enough to be signed as a free agent. He reached the Triple-A level in 1978, and had a .303 batting average in the Pacific Coast League. He never played in the major leagues, however, and he was released by the following spring. He played a brief stint in the Miami Amigos of the Inter-American League in 1979, but was out of baseball by the end of the season.

== As coach and manager ==
In 1980 he began his post-playing career, starting out as a coach for the Double-A Shreveport Captains. Throughout the eighties he coached and managed several teams in the Giants' organization, including the Captains, Clinton Giants, Fresno Giants and Phoenix Firebirds. It wasn't until 1989 that he got his first taste of big league baseball, when he became the first base coach for the Giants under Roger Craig. The Giants won the 1989 National League pennant in Kim's first season, but fell in the 1989 World Series to the cross-bay Oakland Athletics.

Kim coached for the Giants under Craig and Dusty Baker for eight years (1989–96), switching to the third-base coach's box in 1992. He then left to coach third base for the Boston Red Sox under Jimy Williams. He held that job in Boston for four years, manning the position from 1997 to 2000.

After his replacement by Gene Lamont as Boston's third base coach in October 2000, Kim became manager of the 2001 Indianapolis Indians, the Triple-A affiliate of the Milwaukee Brewers. That job was short-lived, however, as he left after one season to become Frank Robinson's bench coach for the 2002 Montreal Expos.

Kim returned to coaching third base, taking that position with the Chicago Cubs in 2003–04, reuniting him with Baker. Kim's controversial and aggressive style of sending runners home often resulted in outs and garnered him the nicknames "Wavin' Wendell," "Windmill Wendell," but not “Wave 'em in Wendell," but primarily "Send 'Em In Kim." After one year managing in the Rookie-level Gulf Coast League in the Washington Nationals organization, Kim retired from baseball in 2006 and moved to Arizona. In ten seasons as a minor-league manager, he compiled a win–loss record of 669–645 (.509).

In retirement, Kim suffered from short-term memory loss, and was diagnosed with early-onset Alzheimer's disease. He died on February 15, 2015, in Phoenix at 64.

Sporting positions
Preceded by Duane Espy	Shreveport Captains manager 1986	Succeeded by Jack Mull
Preceded by Jim Lefebvre	Phoenix Firebirds manager 1987–1988	Succeeded by Gordon Mackenzie
Preceded by Dusty Baker	San Francisco Giants first base coach 1989–1991	Succeeded by Bob Brenly
Preceded by Bill Fahey	San Francisco Giants third base coach 1992–1996	Succeeded by Sonny Jackson
Preceded by Dave Oliver	Boston Red Sox third base coach 1997–2000	Succeeded by Gene Lamont
Preceded by Steve Smith	Indianapolis Indians manager 2001	Succeeded by Ed Romero
Preceded by Rick Renick	Montreal Expos bench coach 2002	Succeeded by Brad Mills
Preceded by Dave Bialas	Chicago Cubs third base coach 2003–2004	Succeeded by Chris Speier
