= 1964 California League season =

- League: California League
- Sport: Baseball
- Duration: April 21 – September 7
- Number of games: 140
- Number of teams: 8

Regular season
- League champions: Fresno Giants
- Season MVP: Ollie Brown, Fresno Giants

Playoffs
- League champions: Fresno Giants

CALL seasons
- ← 1963 1965 →

The 1964 California League was a Class A baseball season played between April 21 and September 7. Eight teams played a 140-game schedule, as the winner of each half of the season qualified for the California League championship round.

The Fresno Giants won the California League championship, as they had the best record in both halves of the season.

== Team changes ==
- The Santa Barbara Rancheros are renamed to the Santa Barbara Dodgers. The club remained affiliated with the Los Angeles Dodgers.

== Teams ==
1964 California League
Team	City	MLB Affiliate	Stadium
Bakersfield Bears	Bakersfield, California	Philadelphia Phillies	Sam Lynn Ballpark
Fresno Giants	Fresno, California	San Francisco Giants	John Euless Park
Modesto Colts	Modesto, California	Houston Colt .45s	Del Webb Field
Reno Silver Sox	Reno, Nevada	Pittsburgh Pirates	Moana Stadium
Salinas Mets	Salinas, California	New York Mets	Salinas Municipal Stadium
San Jose Bees	San Jose, California	Los Angeles Angels	San Jose Municipal Stadium
Santa Barbara Dodgers	Santa Barbara, California	Los Angeles Dodgers	Laguna Ball Park
Stockton Ports	Stockton, California	Baltimore Orioles	Billy Hebert Field

== Map of teams ==
California League Teams

== Regular season ==
=== Summary ===
- The Fresno Giants finished with the best record in the regular season for the first time since 1958.

=== Standings ===
California League
Team	Win	Loss	%	GB
Fresno Giants	86	53	.619	–
Salinas Mets	79	59	.572	6.5
San Jose Bees	73	67	.521	13.5
Stockton Ports	69	70	.496	17
Santa Barbara Dodgers	68	71	.489	18
Reno Silver Sox	66	71	.482	19
Modesto Colts	58	81	.417	28
Bakersfield Bears	56	83	.403	30

== League Leaders ==
=== Batting leaders ===
Stat	Player	Total
AVG	Bob Taylor, Fresno Giants	.364
H	Bob Taylor, Fresno Giants	188
R	Ollie Brown, Fresno Giants	111
2B	Lee Hyman, Modesto Colts	36
3B	Ollie Brown, Fresno Giants; Jay Johnstone, San Jose Bees; Hank McGraw, Salinas Mets; Bob Taylor, Fresno Giants	11
HR	Ollie Brown, Fresno Giants	40
RBI	Ollie Brown, Fresno Giants	133
SB	Robert Mitchell, San Jose Bees	44

=== Pitching leaders ===
Stat	Player	Total
W	Pedro Reinoso, Fresno Giants	18
ERA	Ed Barnowski, Stockton Ports	1.95
CG	Ed Barnowski, Stockton Ports; James Zwergel, Modesto Colts	15
SHO	Ed Barnowski, Stockton Ports	5
IP	Ed Barnowski, Stockton Ports	222.0
SO	Ed Barnowski, Stockton Ports	321

== Playoffs ==
- No playoffs were held as the Fresno Giants had the best record in the league in both halves of the season.
- The Fresno Giants won their fifth California League championship.

=== Playoff bracket ===
Finals
1	Fresno

== Awards ==
California League awards
Award name	Recipient
Most Valuable Player	Ollie Brown, Fresno Giants

== See also ==
- 1964 Major League Baseball season
