= 1965 California League season =

- League: California League
- Sport: Baseball
- Duration: April 18 – September 6
- Games: 140
- Teams: 6

Regular season
- League champions: Stockton Ports
- Season MVP: Mike Epstein, Stockton Ports

Playoffs
- League champions: Stockton Ports
- Runners-up: San Jose Bees

CALL seasons
- ← 1964 1966 →

The 1965 California League was a Class A baseball season played between April 18 and September 6. Six teams played a 140-game schedule, as the winner of each half of the season qualified for the California League championship round.

The Stockton Ports won the California League championship, as they defeated the San Jose Bees in the final round of the playoffs.

== Team changes ==
- The Modesto Colts ended their affiliation with the Houston Colt .45s and took a leave of absence from the league.
- The Reno Silver Sox ended their affiliation with the Pittsburgh Pirates and took a leave of absence from the league.
- The Salinas Mets ended their affiliation with the New York Mets and began a new affiliation with the Cleveland Indians. The club was renamed to the Salinas Indians.

== Teams ==
1965 California League
Team	City	MLB Affiliate	Stadium
Bakersfield Bears	Bakersfield, California	Philadelphia Phillies	Sam Lynn Ballpark
Fresno Giants	Fresno, California	San Francisco Giants	John Euless Park
Salinas Indians	Salinas, California	Cleveland Indians	Salinas Municipal Stadium
San Jose Bees	San Jose, California	California Angels	San Jose Municipal Stadium
Santa Barbara Dodgers	Santa Barbara, California	Los Angeles Dodgers	Laguna Ball Park
Stockton Ports	Stockton, California	Baltimore Orioles	Billy Hebert Field

== Map of teams ==
California League Teams

== Regular season ==
=== Summary ===
- The Stockton Ports finished with the best record in the regular season for the first time since 1963.

=== Standings ===
California League
Team	Win	Loss	%	GB
Stockton Ports	83	57	.593	–
San Jose Bees	72	68	.514	11
Fresno Giants	70	69	.504	12.5
Salinas Indians	67	72	.482	15.5
Bakersfield Bears	66	74	.471	17
Santa Barbara Dodgers	61	79	.436	22

== League Leaders ==
=== Batting leaders ===
Stat	Player	Total
AVG	Mike Epstein, Stockton Ports	.338
H	Bobby Etheridge, Fresno Giants	176
R	Angelo Galasso, Bakersfield Bears	113
2B	Don Wilkinson, San Jose Bees	27
3B	Frank Baker, Salinas Indians; Dave Marshall, San Jose Bees	13
HR	Mike Epstein, Stockton Ports	30
RBI	Bobby Etheridge, Fresno Giants	107
SB	Dave Nelson, Salinas Indians	41

=== Pitching leaders ===
Stat	Player	Total
W	Jack Nutter, Bakersfield Bears	16
ERA	George Sherrod, San Jose Bees	2.81
CG	Jack Nutter, Bakersfield Bears	17
SHO	Carroll Moulden, Stockton Ports	5
IP	Jack Nutter, Bakersfield Bears	238.0
SO	Jack Nutter, Bakersfield Bears	223

== Playoffs ==
- The Stockton Ports won their fourth California League championship, defeating the San Jose Bees in two games.

=== Playoff bracket ===
Finals
1	San Jose	0
2	Stockton	2

== Awards ==
California League awards
Award name	Recipient
Most Valuable Player	Mike Epstein, Stockton Ports

== See also ==
- 1965 Major League Baseball season
