= Dave Oliver =

American baseball player (born 1951)

- Second baseman
- Born: April 7, 1951 (age 75); Stockton, California, U.S.
- Batted: Left Threw: Right

MLB debut
- September 25, 1977, for the Cleveland Indians

Last MLB appearance
- October 2, 1977, for the Cleveland Indians

MLB statistics
- Batting average: .318
- At bats: 22
- Hits: 7
- Stats at Baseball Reference

Teams
- As player: Cleveland Indians (1977); As coach: Texas Rangers (1987–1994); Boston Red Sox (1995–1996)

David Jacob Oliver (born April 7, 1951) is an American former professional baseball infielder and coach. He is currently a member of the scouting department for the Kansas City Royals. Primarily a second baseman as a professional player, he batted left-handed and threw right-handed, stood 5 feet 11 inches (1.80 m) tall and weighed 180 pounds (82 kg). He attended Cal Poly in San Luis Obispo, California. While playing for the Mustangs from 1970 to 1973, Oliver collected 226 hits, batted .320 and with 706 at bats ranked second to fellow Mustang Ozzie Smith.

== Career ==
Oliver originally signed with the Cleveland Indians in 1973 after being selected in the third round of the June draft, and his only trial in the Major Leagues consisted of seven games with the 1977 Indians. He batted 22 times, collecting seven hits, including a triple, three runs batted in, and four bases on balls. His batting average was .318. He returned to the Cleveland farm system and played through 1980, then became manager of the Indians' Batavia farm club in the Short Season Class A New York–Penn League in 1981–1982. The following year, he joined to the Rangers for the first time, as manager of their Tri-Cities affiliate in the Short Season-A Northwest League. Then, in 1984, he became the Rangers' roving minor league infield instructor. In 1985–1986, he returned to managing, this time at the Triple-A level, as pilot of Texas' top affiliate, the Oklahoma City 89ers of the American Association, leading them to a first-place finish in the Association's Western Division in 1985.

He was then promoted to the Major Leagues as a coach for the Rangers (1987–1994) and the Boston Red Sox (1995–1996), working as a third-base coach after 1987 under managers Bobby Valentine, Toby Harrah and Kevin Kennedy.

He spent the 2001 season in professional baseball as manager of the Stockton, California-based Mudville Nine, a Class A California League farm team of the Cincinnati Reds, but largely worked in private business in the Stockton area until he rejoined the Rangers as special assistant for baseball operations in 2011, hired by Ranger CEO and former Baseball Hall of Fame pitcher Nolan Ryan. In 2013, he was listed by the Rangers as special assistant for player development.

Preceded by Tim Foli	Texas Rangers third-base coach 1987–1994	Succeeded by Jerry Narron
Preceded by Gary Allenson	Boston Red Sox third-base coach 1995–1996	Succeeded by Wendell Kim
