= Shin-Ming Tan =

Taiwanese baseball player and coach

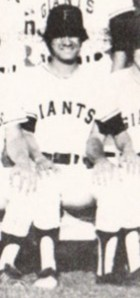
- Shin-Ming Tan with the Fresno Giants in 1974

Fresno Giants
- Pitcher
- Born: June 16, 1950 (age 75); Chiayi County, Taiwan
- Batted: Right Threw: Right

California League debut
- May, 1974, for the Fresno Giants

Last California League appearance
- September, 1974, for the Fresno Giants

MiLB statistics
- Win–loss record: 8–4
- Earned run average: 4.68
- Strikeouts: 53
- Saves: 2

Teams
- Fresno Giants (1974)

Career highlights and awards
- First Taiwanese-born player in Minor League Baseball

Member of the Taiwanese

Baseball Hall of Fame
- Induction: 2022

Shin-Ming Tan (Chinese: 譚信民; Wade–Giles: Tan^{2} Hsin^{4}-min^{2}; born 16 June 1950 in Chiayi County, Taiwan), also known as Tan Hsin-min, is a Taiwanese baseball pitcher and coach. Tan was the first player from Taiwan to play professional baseball in the United States, playing for the Fresno Giants in 1974.

== Early life and education ==
Tan was born in Chiayi County to Tan Feng-chun (譚鳳君), who was an amateur baseball player and member of the Chiayi County Sports Committee. Tan attended Liu Hsin Home Economics and Commercial High School (六信家商; present-day Liu Hsin Senior High School) in Tainan and played on the varsity baseball team.

Tan joined the Republic of China Air Force (ROCAF) as part of the national compulsory military service and played on the ROCAF baseball team. He was selected to be on the Taiwanese national baseball team numerous times and served as captain.

== Playing career ==
While on the Air Force team, Tan played on the national team in the 1969 Asian Championship, 1971 Asian Championship, 1972 Amateur World Series, 1973 Asian Championship, 1973 Amateur World Series and 1973 Intercontinental Cup. In the 1972 Amateur World Series, he made the All-Star team as the best right-handed pitcher. He led that Series in strikeouts (53) and innings pitched (51 1/3).

Tan signed with the Taiheiyo Club Lions of the Pacific League. They shipped him out to train with the Fresno Giants. He pitched 23 games, 9 of them starts (5 complete games), posting a 8–4 record with 2 saves. He allowed 87 hits and 22 walks in 73 innings while striking out 53 and posting a 4.68 ERA. As the California League had recently instituted a designated hitter rule, he did not bat. After the season, the San Francisco Giants signed him, but he never again pitched in their farm system.

Shin-Ming Tan was the first player from Taiwan to play professional baseball in the United States, and the first Taiwanese native to sign with an MLB team, predating Chin-Feng Chen by 26 years. Tan returned to Taiwan and pitched in amateur leagues as there was no professional baseball in his homeland yet.

In 1975, after returning to Taiwan from California, Shin-Ming Tan played for the Taiwan Cooperative Bank baseball team. Because it had been less than a year since he left the Fresno Giants, he was disqualified from playing in the 1975 Asian Championship. He played in the 1976 Amateur World Series.

== Coaching career ==
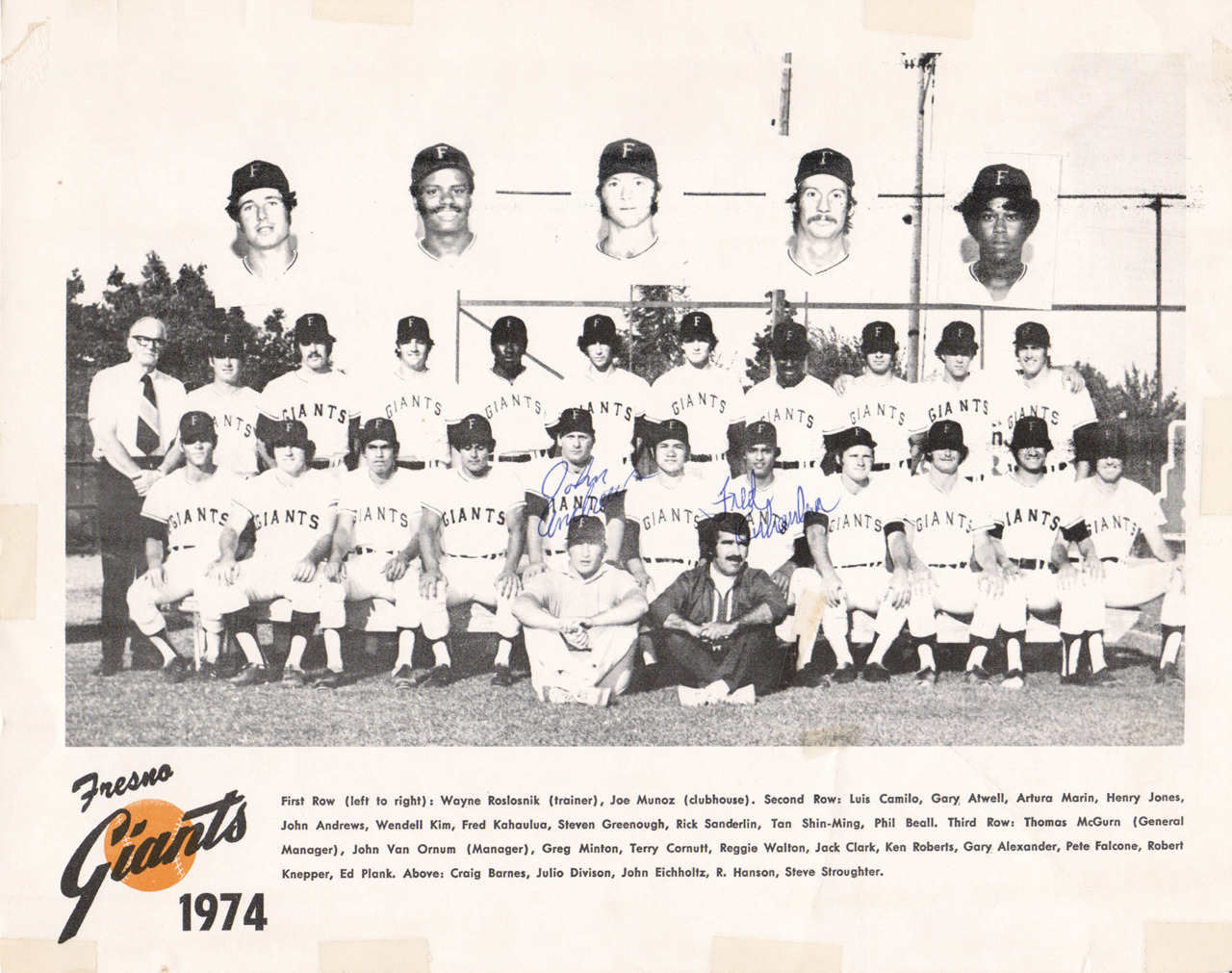
1974 Fresno Giants

Tan later coached for the Chinese Cultural University and the Brother Hotels collegiate and amateur teams. In the 1986 Baseball World Cup, he coached for Team Taiwan and was manager of the team in the 1988 Haarlem Baseball Week (Haarlemse Honkbalweek). From 1991 to 1993, Tan was manager of the Mercuries Tigers of the Chinese Professional Baseball League (CPBL), guiding them to a 104–147 record. He was briefly a visiting coach in the Korea Baseball Organization, working with the Lotte Giants. Tan threw a knuckleball, fastball and curveball.

== Sources ==
- 1975 Baseball Guide * A History of Cuban Baseball by Peter Bjarkman (1972 AWS stats)
