= Ed Barnowski =

American baseball player (1943–2017)

- Pitcher
- Born: August 23, 1943; Scranton, Pennsylvania, U.S.
- Died: October 17, 2017 (aged 74); Naples, Florida, U.S.
- Batted: Right Threw: Right

MLB debut
- September 8, 1965, for the Baltimore Orioles

Last MLB appearance
- September 16, 1966, for the Baltimore Orioles

MLB statistics
- Win–loss record: 0–0
- Earned run average: 2.45
- Strikeouts: 8
- Innings pitched: 71/3
- Stats at Baseball Reference

Teams
- Baltimore Orioles (1965–1966)

Edward Anthony Barnowski (August 23, 1943 – October 17, 2017) was an American professional baseball player. He was a right-handed pitcher who received two brief trials with the 1965–1966 Baltimore Orioles of Major League Baseball. Barnowski graduated from Mont Pleasant High School, Schenectady, New York, and pitched for Syracuse University before signing with the Orioles in 1963. He stood 6 feet 2 inches (1.88 m) tall and weighed 195 pounds (88 kg).

The first four seasons (1963–1966) of Barnowski's minor league baseball career were highly successful. At Oriole farm teams ranging from the Rookie classification to Triple-A, he won 48 games and lost 18, twice registered an earned run average below 2.00, and in 1965 struck out 207 batters in 177 innings pitched in the Double-A Eastern League. Baseball Digest wrote in his March 1965 scouting report: "Can throw real good fast ball and curve. Fields well. Hard worker. An A-1 prospect." Barnowski had his first MLB trial in September 1965; in 4 1/3 innings pitched over four games played, all in relief, he allowed only one earned run and struck out six. However, Barnowski issued seven bases on balls.

In 1966, Barnowski won 17 of 25 decisions for the Rochester Red Wings of the International League, and earned another September callup. In two games in relief, he allowed one earned run and four hits. The Orioles went on to win the 1966 World Series behind young pitchers Dave McNally, Jim Palmer and Wally Bunker, and the following season Barnowski was sent back to Rochester. He would play his final Major League game on September 16, 1966.

Control problems and military service affected Barnowski's performance and he won only four of 11 decisions, with his earned run average a poor 4.92. From then, his playing career wound down swiftly with only a 2–9 cumulative record in 1968 and 1969, his final year as a player. Barnowski remained in the game briefly as a front office executive with the Red Wings, resigning after the 1975 season.

Barnowski died on October 17, 2017.
