= Shreveport Captains =

- 1971–2002; Shreveport, Louisiana

Minor league affiliations
- Class: Double-A (1971–2002)
- League: Texas League (1971–2002)

Major league affiliations
- Team: California Angels (1971–72); Milwaukee Brewers (1973–74); Pittsburgh Pirates (1975–78); San Francisco Giants (1979–2002)

Minor league titles
- League titles (3): 1990; 1991; 1995
- Division titles (5): 1976; 1990; 1991; 1995; 1997
- First-half titles (10): 1987; 1988; 1990; 1991; 1992; 1994; 1995; 1997; 1999; 2000
- Second-half titles (7): 1979; 1986; 1989; 1991; 1993; 1995; 1997

Team data
- Name: Shreveport Swamp Dragons (2001–02); Shreveport Captains (1971–2000)
- Mascot: The Captain (1991–2000)
- Ballpark: Fair Grounds Field (1986–2002): SPAR Stadium (1971–1985)

The Shreveport Captains (1971–2000) and Shreveport Swamp Dragons (2001–02) were a professional minor-league baseball team based in Shreveport, Louisiana. They were affiliated with the California Angels (1971–72), Milwaukee Brewers (1973–74), Pittsburgh Pirates (1975–78) and San Francisco Giants (1979–2002).

After the 2002 season, the team moved to Frisco, Texas, to become the Frisco RoughRiders.

== Season-by-season ==
Year	Record	Finish	Manager	Playoffs
1971	69–73	5th	Les Moss	
1972	64–76	7th	Norm Sherry	
1973	70–68	3rd	Gene Freese	
1974	59–79	7th	Gene Freese / Ken McBride	
1975	76–52	2nd	Tim Murtaugh	
1976	70–66	3rd	Johnny Lipon	Lost League Finals
1977	62–68	5th (t)	Johnny Lipon/ Tim Murtaugh	
1978	55–81	7th	Steve Demeter	
1979	73–62	3rd	Andy Gilbert	Lost in 1st round
1980	49–87	8th	Andy Gilbert	
1981	68–67	5th	Jack Mull	
1982	62–73	7th	Jack Mull	
1983	72–64	2nd	Duane Espy	
1984	59–77	7th	Duane Espy	
1985	72–64	3rd	Duane Espy	
1986	80–56	2nd	Wendell Kim	Lost in 1st round
1987	78–57	1st	Jack Mull	Lost in 1st round
1988	74–62	3rd	Jack Mull	Lost in 1st round
1989	75–61	2nd	Bill Evers	Lost in 1st round
1990	65–68	6th	Bill Evers	Texas League Champs
1991	86–50	1st	Bill Evers	Texas League Champs
1992	77–59	1st (t)	Bill Robinson	Lost League Finals
1993	66–70	7th	Ron Wotus	Lost in 1st round
1994	73–63	3rd	Ron Wotus	Lost in 1st round
1995	88–47	1st	Ron Wotus	Texas League Champs
1996	73–66	3rd	Frank Cacciatore	
1997	76–62	2nd	Carlos Lezcano	Lost League Finals
1998	57–83	8th	Mike Hart	
1999	71–69	4th	Shane Turner	Lost in 1st round
2000	58–81	8th	Bill Hayes	Lost in 1st round
2001	54–81	8th	Bill Russell	
2002	60–79	7th	Mario Mendoza	

=== Major league alumni ===
- Mike Aldrete (Giants, Expos, Padres, Indians, Athletics, Angels, Yankees)
- Rich Aurilia (Giants, Mariners, Reds)
- Marvin Benard (Giants)
- Jeff Brantley (SF Giants, Reds, Cardinals, Philies, Rangers)
- Troy Brohawn (SF Giants, Arizona Diamondbacks, LA Dodgers)
- Nate Bump (Marlins)
- John Burkett (SF Giants, Texas Rangers, Atlanta Braves, Boston Red Sox)
- Jay Canizaro (Giants, Twins)
- Royce Clayton (Giants, Cardinals, Rangers, White Sox, Brewers, Rockies, Diamondbacks, Nationals)
- Dennis Cook (Giants, Indians, Mets, Angels)
- Chili Davis (Giants, Angels, Yankees, Twins, Royals)
- Pedro Feliz (SF Giants)
- Jesse Foppert (Giants)
- Keith Foulke (Giants, White Sox, Red Sox)
- Aaron Fultz (Giants, Rangers, Twins, Phillies)
- Scott Garrelts (Giants)
- Joey Gathright (Devil Rays, Royals, Cubs, Red Sox)
- Rick Honeycutt (Mariners, Dodgers, A's, Rangers, Cardinals)
- Sixto Lezcano (Brewers, Padres, Phillies, Cardinals)
- Scott Linebrink (Giants, Astros, Padres, Brewers, White Sox, Braves)
- Ramón Martínez (Giants, Cubs, Tigers, Phillies, Dodgers)
- Damon Minor (Giants)
- Doug Mirabelli (Giants, Red Sox, Rangers, Padres)
- Bill Mueller (Giants, Cubs, Red Sox, Dodgers)
- Calvin Murray (Giants, Rangers, Cubs)
- Joe Nathan (Giants, Twins, Rangers, Tigers)
- Lance Niekro (Giants)
- Tom O'Malley (Giants, Mets, Orioles, Rangers)
- Russ Ortiz (Giants, Braves, Diamondbacks, Orioles)
- Mike Remlinger (Giants, Mets, Reds, Braves, Cubs, Red Sox)
- Chris Singleton (White Sox, Orioles, A's, Devil Rays)
- Yorvit Torrealba (Giants, Rockies, Mariners)
- Jason Grilli (Giants, Marlins, White Sox, Tigers, Rockies, Rangers, Pirates, Angels, and Blue Jays)
- Rod Beck (Giants, Cubs, Red Sox, and Padres)
