= Duane Espy =

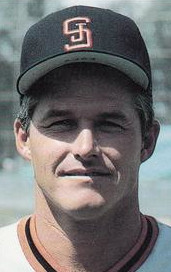
- Espy with the San Jose Giants in 1988
- Second baseman / Coach
- Born: June 23, 1952 (age 73); Aberdeen, Washington, U.S.
- Bats: Right Throws: Right

Duane Grant Espy (born June 23, 1952) is a Major League Baseball coach and a minor league baseball manager.

Espy played in the Milwaukee Brewers farm system from 1971 to 1978. He then managed in the minor leagues from 1979 to 1980 with the Burlington Bees of the Midwest League, from 1981 to 1982 with the Stockton Ports of the California League, from 1983 to 1985 with the Shreveport Captains of the Texas League, from 1988 to 1989 with the San Jose Giants of the California League, in 1990–91 with the Phoenix Firebirds of the Pacific Coast League and in 2000 with the Las Vegas Stars, also of the PCL.

Espy then served as the hitting coach for the Colorado Rockies baseball in 2003 before becoming a coach in the Rockies farm system, where he has spent the last 13 years.

He managed the Tulsa Drillers in the Texas League in 2011–12 before being named the team's Double-A Development Supervisor in 2013 and then served as the Supervisor at Short Season-A Tri-City during the 2014 season.

Following a lack of offensive success in the 2018 season, the Rockies announced Espy would not return as hitting coordinator.

Preceded by Ron Gideon	Tulsa Drillers Manager; 2011–2012	Succeeded by Kevin Riggs
