= Mark Dempsey (baseball) =

American baseball player (born 1957)

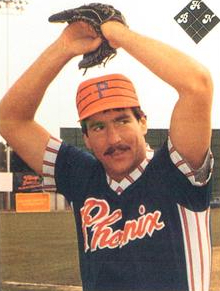
- Dempsey with the Phoenix Giants c. 1983
- Pitcher
- Born: December 17, 1957 (age 67); Dayton, Ohio, U.S.
- Batted: Right Threw: Right

MLB debut
- September 4, 1982, for the San Francisco Giants

Last MLB appearance
- October 2, 1982, for the San Francisco Giants

MLB statistics
- Games pitched: 3
- Earned run average: 7.94
- Strikeouts: 4
- Stats at Baseball Reference

Teams
- San Francisco Giants (1982)

Mark Steven Dempsey (born December 17, 1957) is a former Major League Baseball pitcher who played for the San Francisco Giants in 1982.
