= Fresno Cardinals (collegiate summer baseball team) =

Fresno Cardinals
Founded	2010
Ballpark	John Euless Ballpark
Based in	Fresno, California
Team Colors	Red, Dark Blue and White
Division	South
League	Far West League

The Fresno Cardinals are a collegiate summer baseball team that will play in the South Division of the Far West League. They are based out of Fresno, California, and will begin play in 2011 in the new league at John Euless Ballpark in Lodi. They are a former member of the Pacific West Baseball League, which merged with the West Coast Tri-State League to form the new FWL.
