= John Balaz =

Canadian baseball player (born 1950)

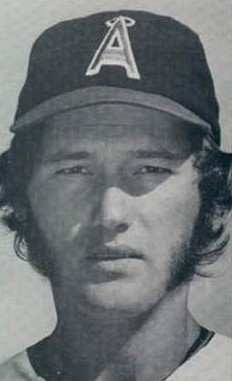
- Left fielder
- Born: November 24, 1950 (age 75); Toronto, Ontario, Canada
- Batted: Right Threw: Right

MLB debut
- September 10, 1974, for the California Angels

Last MLB appearance
- September 28, 1975, for the California Angels

MLB statistics
- Batting average: .241
- Home runs: 2
- Runs batted in: 15
- Stats at Baseball Reference

Teams
- California Angels (1974–1975)

John Lawrence Balaz (born November 24, 1950) is a Canadian former professional baseball player. Balaz was 23 years old when he broke into the big leagues on September 10, 1974, with the California Angels.

== Career ==
=== California Angels ===
Balaz attended Point Loma High School in San Diego, CA. He then went on to San Diego City College while attending there he was drafted by the California Angels in the 5th round (108th overall) of the 1970 amateur baseball draft.

An outstanding minor league hitter who led three leagues in runs batted in, Balaz made his major league debut in an unusual way on September 10, 1974 at Anaheim Stadium. In a game against the Kansas City Royals, he was announced as a pinch hitter for left fielder Bruce Bochte in the bottom of the 6th. Kansas City made a pitching change, so manager Dick Williams decided to have Rudy Meoli pinch hit for Balaz, who had to go back and take a seat on the dugout bench. He got into a game three days later, starting in left field against the Chicago White Sox at Comiskey Park, and went 0-for-3 against Jim Kaat. On September 24 he had a big game against the Royals in Kansas City, with a home run and four RBI.

Balaz spent more time with the Angels in 1975, hitting .242 (29-for-120) in 45 games with 1 HR and 10 RBI. He was in the starting lineup for 30 of those games as a left fielder, right fielder, and designated hitter.

Career totals include 59 games played, a .241 batting average (39-for-162), 2 home runs, 15 RBI, 14 runs scored, and a .340 slugging percentage.

Balaz began to play in 1974, and appeared in 14 games that season, in which he had 42 at bats, scored four times, had 10 hits (nine singles and one home run), drove in 5 runs, walked twice, struck out 10 times, had one sacrifice hit, and was hit by pitch once. He finished with a .238 batting average, .289 on-base percentage and .310 slugging percentage.

=== Boston Red Sox ===
On March 3, 1976, during spring training, the Angels traded Balaz, Dick Sharon, and Dave Machemer to the Boston Red Sox in exchange for reliever Dick Drago. Balaz was sent down to the minor leagues, and never played for the Red Sox. It was reported that Drago was sent to the Angels as the player to be named later for Denny Doyle (acquired the previous June). The Red Sox still sent minor league pitcher Chuck Ross to the Angels two days later to make everything look more legitimate.

== Post major league career ==
Balaz never again appeared in a big league game. After playing for the Rhode Island Red Sox in 1976, he split the 1977 season between the Los Angeles Dodgers and San Diego Padres minor league organizations. He continued his career in Mexico while playing for the Indios de Ciudad Juárez club. Balaz gained prominence when he played in the 1979 Mexican League playoffs where his team made it to the finals.

Balaz now lives in Las Vegas Nevada with his wife Bonnie and their children Lauren and Justin.

== Facts ==
Balaz hit his first major league home run off Kansas City Royals pitcher Paul Splittorff (Royals Stadium, September 24, 1974), and his second and last against Vic Albury of the Minnesota Twins (Anaheim Stadium, July 26, 1975).

== Achievements ==
Balaz led in several leagues throughout his career.

He topped the Pioneer League with 14 HR and 51 RBI while playing for the Idaho Falls Angels in 1971.

He then led the California League with 28 HR and 113 RBI while playing for the Salinas Angels in 1973, and led the Texas League with 111 RBI while playing for the El Paso Diablos in 1974.
