= Brad Wellman =

American baseball player (born 1959)

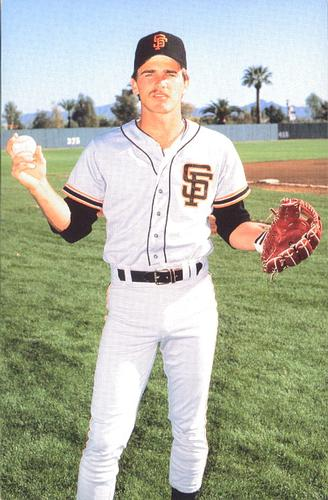
- Second baseman
- Born: August 17, 1959 (age 67); Lodi, California, U.S.
- Batted: Right Threw: Right

MLB debut
- September 4, 1982, for the San Francisco Giants

Last MLB appearance
- October 1, 1989, for the Kansas City Royals

MLB statistics
- Batting average: .231
- Home runs: 6
- Runs batted in: 77
- Stats at Baseball Reference

Teams
- San Francisco Giants (1982–1986); Los Angeles Dodgers (1987); Kansas City Royals (1988–1989)

Brad Eugene Wellman (born August 17, 1959) is an American former professional baseball infielder. Prior to the majors he played at Castro Valley High School.

Wellman was originally signed by the Kansas City Royals as an amateur free agent in 1978 and he eventually made his major league debut with the San Francisco Giants on September 4, 1982. His last game was on October 1, 1989.

Wellman's son Casey is a professional ice hockey player for Frolunda Indians in the Swedish Hockey League (SHL). He is also the brother-in-law of MLB pitcher Tom Candiotti.
