= Jorge Roque =

Puerto Rican baseball player (born 1950)

- Center fielder
- Born: April 28, 1950 (age 76); Ponce, Puerto Rico
- Batted: Right Threw: Right

MLB debut
- September 4, 1970, for the St. Louis Cardinals

Last MLB appearance
- May 15, 1973, for the Montreal Expos

MLB statistics
- Batting average: .137
- Home runs: 2
- Runs batted in: 12
- Stats at Baseball Reference

Teams
- St. Louis Cardinals (1970–1972); Montreal Expos (1973)

Jorge Roque Vargas (born April 29, 1950) is a Puerto Rican former professional baseball player who was an outfielder for 65 career games in Major League Baseball for the St. Louis Cardinals from 1970 to 1972 and the Montreal Expos in 1973. He threw and batted right-handed, stood 5 feet 10 inches (1.78 m) tall and weighed 158 pounds (72 kg).

Roque joined the Cardinals' organization in 1967. He was called to the majors for the first time in September 1970 after his selection as an All-Star by the Class A California League, where he led the circuit in runs scored (101) and hits (165) in 137 games played. In 1971, after another strong showing, this time in the Double-A Texas League, Roque received another September audition. In his first game back with the Cardinals, he had three hits in four at bats September 26 against the Expos. Then he spent the second half of 1972 with the MLB Cardinals; he appeared in 32 games and started 19 as a center- or right fielder, but he batted an anaemic .104, with seven total hits in 67 at bats. On November 6, the Cardinals traded Roque to Montreal to reacquire their former All-Star catcher of the 1960s, Tim McCarver.

Despite having hit a grand slam as Montreal's starting center fielder on Opening Day 1973, and receiving a lengthy trial during the season's first month, his desperate struggles as a batsman continued. Three consecutive two-hit games from April 17–19 lifted his batting mark to .222, but he would collect only one more safety through May 6, when he was supplanted by Ron Woods as the club's right-handed-hitting center fielder. Roque was sent to Triple-A after May 15. He hit .148 in 61 at bats during his Expo tenure. As a major leaguer, he collected only 19 career hits and ten bases on balls in 154 plate appearances; he batted .137 with four doubles, one triple, and two home runs.

His professional career continued in the Triple-A Mexican League from 1974 to 1979. He was selected by the New York Mets from Pericos de Puebla in the Rule 5 Draft on December 2, 1974.
