= Mike Chris =

American baseball player (born 1957)

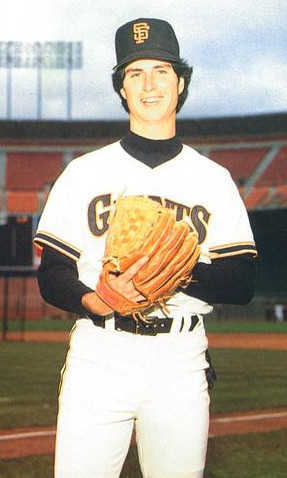
- Chris in 1983
- Pitcher
- Born: October 8, 1957 (age 68); Santa Monica, California, U.S.
- Batted: Left Threw: Left

MLB debut
- July 31, 1979, for the Detroit Tigers

Last MLB appearance
- May 1, 1983, for the San Francisco Giants

MLB statistics
- Win–loss record: 3–5
- Earned run average: 6.43
- Strikeouts: 46
- Stats at Baseball Reference

Teams
- Detroit Tigers (1979); San Francisco Giants (1982–1983)

Michael Chris (born October 8, 1957) is an American former professional baseball pitcher. He played in Major League Baseball (MLB) for the Detroit Tigers and San Francisco Giants. He attended the West Los Angeles Junior College.

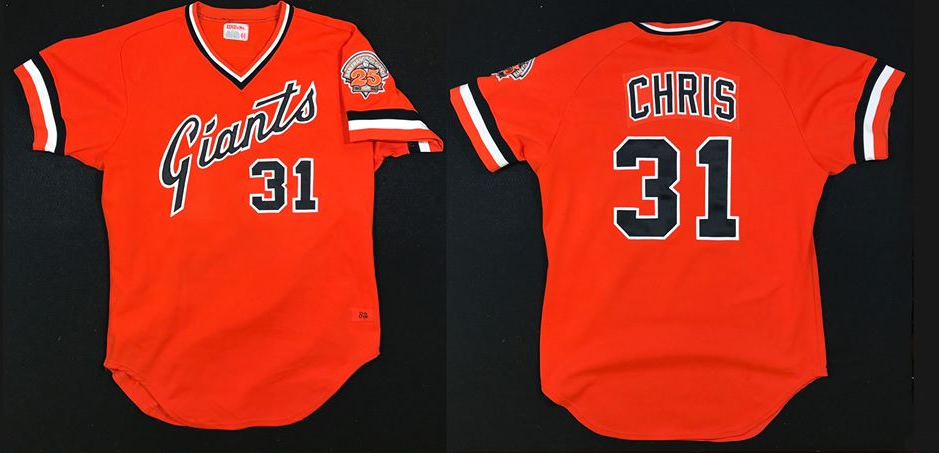
1982 San Francisco Giants #31 Mike Chris game worn alternate jersey

Chris appeared in games in three Major League seasons, starting approximately half of the games. The Detroit Tigers drafted him with the 10th overall pick of the 1977 Major League Baseball draft and promoted him to the majors in 1979 to pitch in 13 games, starting eight. Chris finished with a record of three wins against three losses, with a 6.92 ERA. The Tigers traded him to the San Francisco Giants in 1981 with Dan Schatzeder for Larry Herndon. He pitched in part of two seasons for the Giants, but they placed him on waivers in 1983. The Chicago Cubs claimed him, but he never pitched for the Cubs, and they released him in the offseason.
