= Jose Barrios =

American baseball player (born 1957)

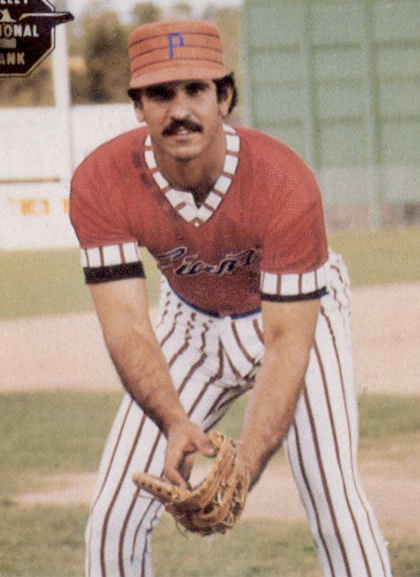
- Barrios with the Phoenix Giants c. 1982
- First baseman
- Born: June 26, 1957; New York, New York, U.S.
- Batted: Right Threw: Right

MLB debut
- April 23, 1982, for the San Francisco Giants

Last MLB appearance
- May 7, 1982, for the San Francisco Giants

MLB statistics
- Games played: 10
- Hits: 3
- Batting average: .158
- Stats at Baseball Reference

Teams
- San Francisco Giants (1982)

Jose Manuel Barrios (born June 26, 1957) is an American former Major League Baseball first baseman who played for the San Francisco Giants in 1982.
