= Guy Sularz =

American baseball player (born 1955)

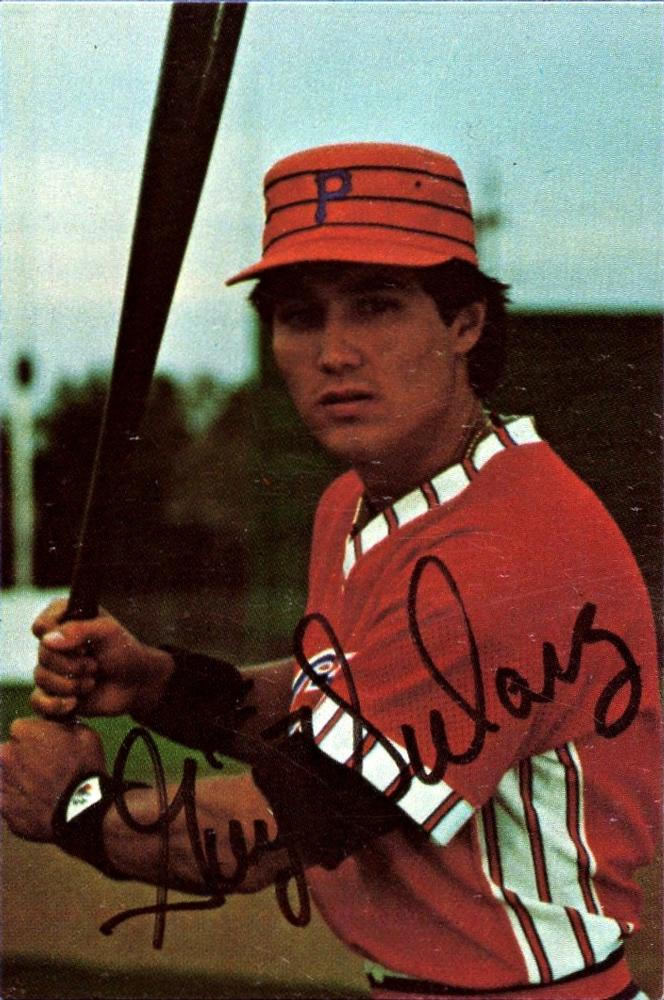
- Infielder
- Born: November 7, 1955; Minneapolis, Minnesota, U.S.
- Batted: Right Threw: Right

MLB debut
- September 2, 1980, for the San Francisco Giants

Last MLB appearance
- October 2, 1983, for the San Francisco Giants

MLB statistics
- Batting average: .218
- Home runs: 1
- Runs batted in: 12
- Stats at Baseball Reference

Teams
- San Francisco Giants (1980–1983)

Guy Patrick Sularz (born November 7, 1955) is an American former infielder in Major League Baseball. He played for the San Francisco Giants.

After Sularz's playing career ended, he became a firefighter in Phoenix, Arizona.
