= Jack Mull =

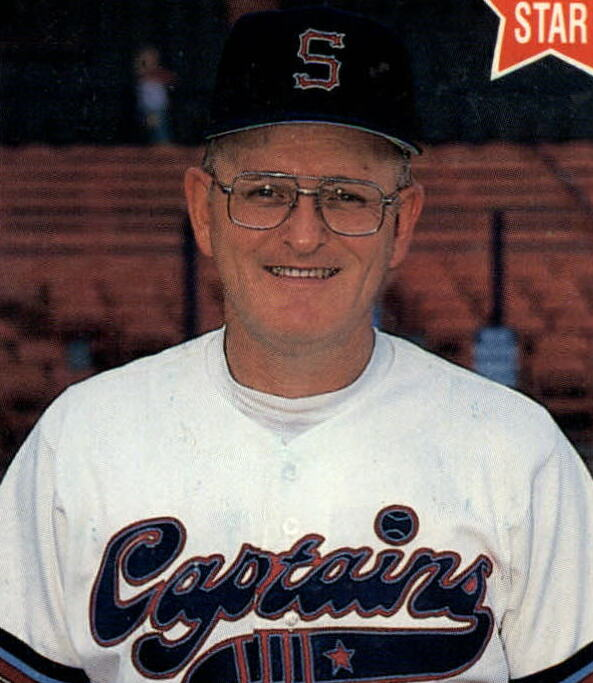
- Mull with the Shreveport Captains c. 1988
- Catcher / Coach
- Born: September 29, 1946 (age 79); Chambersburg, Pennsylvania, U.S.
- Bats: Right Throws: Right

Jack Leroy Mull (born September 29, 1943) is an American former minor league baseball catcher, a major league coach, and minor league manager, and is currently a minor league coach.

== Career ==
Mull began his pro career with the Quincy Cubs in 1969 and played in the minors until 1973. He managed the GCL Cubs in 1974, then returned to AAA as a player in 1975 and 1976. In 1985, Mull was a coach for the San Francisco Giants.

== Recent Minor League coaching assignments ==
- 2001-2002 Buffalo Bisons
- 2003 Burlington Indians
- 2004 Lake County Captains
- 2005 Mahoning Valley Scrappers
- 2006 Lake County Captains

== Year-by-year managerial record ==
Year	Team	League	Record	Finish	Organization	Playoffs
1974	Key West Conchs	Florida State League			Chicago Cubs	
	GCL Cubs	Gulf Coast League	33-14	1st	Chicago Cubs	none League Champs
1977	Cedar Rapids Giants	Midwest League	74-66	4th	San Francisco Giants	Lost in 1st round
1978	Cedar Rapids Giants	Midwest League	53-83	8th	San Francisco Giants	
1979	Fresno Giants	California League	66-73	7th	San Francisco Giants	
1980	Fresno Giants	California League	74-66	4th	San Francisco Giants	Lost in 1st round
1981	Shreveport Captains	Texas League	68-67	5th	San Francisco Giants	
1982	Shreveport Captains	Texas League	62-73	7th	San Francisco Giants	
1983	Phoenix Giants	Pacific Coast League	61-82	10th	San Francisco Giants	
1984	Phoenix Giants	Pacific Coast League	69-74	8th	San Francisco Giants	
1986	Clinton Giants	Midwest League	63-76	11th	San Francisco Giants	
1987	Shreveport Captains	Texas League	78-57	1st	San Francisco Giants	Lost in 1st round
1988	Shreveport Captains	Texas League	74-62	3rd	San Francisco Giants	Lost in 1st round
1990	Clinton Giants	Midwest League	76-58	5th	San Francisco Giants	
1991	Clinton Giants	Midwest League	81-58	1st	San Francisco Giants	League Champs
1993	Clinton Giants	Midwest League	80-54	1st	San Francisco Giants	Lost League Finals
1994	Clinton LumberKings	Midwest League	57-82	13th	San Francisco Giants	
1996	Kinston Indians	Carolina League	76-62	2nd	Cleveland Indians	Lost League Finals
1997	Columbus RedStixx	South Atlantic League	62-76	12th	Cleveland Indians	
1999	Burlington Indians	Appalachian League	21-49	10th	Cleveland Indians	
