= Skip James (baseball) =

American baseball player (born 1949)

- First baseman
- Born: October 21, 1949 (age 76); Elmhurst, Illinois, U.S.
- Batted: Left Threw: Left

Professional debut
- MLB: September 12, 1977, for the San Francisco Giants
- NPB: April 5, 1980, for the Yokohama Taiyo Whales

Last appearance
- MLB: September 23, 1978, for the San Francisco Giants
- NPB: October 23, 1980, for the Yokohama Taiyo Whales

MLB statistics
- Batting average: .167
- Home runs: 0
- Runs batted in: 6
- Stats at Baseball Reference

Teams
- San Francisco Giants (1977–1978); Yokohama Taiyo Whales (1980)

Philip Robert James (born October 21, 1949), better known as Skip James, is an American former professional baseball player. He played in the Major League Baseball(MLB) before a brief stint with the San Francisco Giants, and then played in the Nippon Professional Baseball (NPB) for the Yokohama Taiyo Whales.

== Career ==
James attended Shawnee Mission North High School, and then played football and baseball at the University of Kansas, graduating in 1971. He played in the Pacific Coast League for eight years and was finally drafted in 1977 by the San Francisco Giants; he made his debut on September 12, 1977. He played for the Giants for four months as a pinch-hitter (hitting a game-winning two-run single in September against the Los Angeles Dodgers) before they sent him back to the minors. He played for the Vancouver Canadians in 1979, and in 1980 left the United States to play in Japan for the Yokohama Taiyo Whales, besides Félix Millán.

In 1982, he was hired as a graduate assistant coach at Kansas, and worked there as an assistant coach in 1983 and 1984 as well.
