= Bob Taylor (baseball) =

American baseball player (born 1944)

- Outfielder / Pinch hitter
- Born: March 20, 1944 (age 82); Leland, Mississippi, U.S.
- Batted: Left Threw: Right

MLB debut
- April 9, 1970, for the San Francisco Giants

Last MLB appearance
- September 26, 1970, for the San Francisco Giants

MLB statistics
- Batting average: .190
- Home runs: 2
- Runs batted in: 10

NPB statistics
- Batting average: .259
- Home runs: 30
- Runs batted in: 113
- Stats at Baseball Reference

Teams
- San Francisco Giants (1970); Chunichi Dragons (1973); Hanshin Tigers (1974–1975)

Robert Lee Taylor (born March 20, 1944) is an American former professional baseball player. An outfielder, Taylor played for 17 pro seasons (1962–1978), including a dozen in minor league baseball, four years in Nippon Professional Baseball, and one full season in the Major Leagues with the 1970 San Francisco Giants. Taylor batted left-handed, threw right-handed, stood 5 feet 9 inches (1.75 m) tall and weighed 170 pounds (77 kg).

Taylor signed with San Francisco in 1962 and played eight years in their farm system, winning the 1964 California League batting title with a .364 average. Another productive campaign in 1969 — during which he batted .331 for the Triple-A Phoenix Giants — earned him a spot on the 1970 Giants' 40-man spring training roster. Wrote Baseball Digest in its annual rookie scouting report: "Seldom swings at a bad pitch. Struck out only 25 times in 438 at bats ... Spray hitter with little power but ready to step into a Major League uniform right now. Should make it with Giants."

The report was prescient: Taylor stayed with the Giants all season, getting into 63 games, with an even 100 plate appearances and 84 official at bats. Of his 16 hits, two were for extra bases, but both were home runs against the rival Los Angeles Dodgers, on May 27 against José Peña, and on July 3 in a pinch hitting role against Don Sutton, a future member of the Baseball Hall of Fame.

Taylor returned to Phoenix in 1971 and 1972, and batted over .300 each season, giving him an opportunity to play Japanese baseball from 1973–1975. He then finished his pro career with two more seasons in the Giants' minor league system. All told, he collected 1,258 hits and batted .301 in his minor league career.
