= Alan Fowlkes =

American baseball player (born 1958)

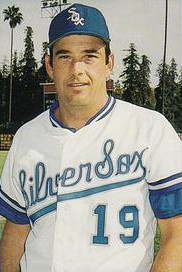
- Fowlkes in 1988
- Pitcher
- Born: August 8, 1958 (age 67); Brawley, California, U.S.
- Batted: Right Threw: Right

MLB debut
- April 7, 1982, for the San Francisco Giants

Last MLB appearance
- August 26, 1985, for the California Angels

MLB statistics
- Win–loss record: 4–2
- Earned run average: 5.48
- Strikeouts: 55
- Stats at Baseball Reference

Teams
- San Francisco Giants (1982); California Angels (1985)

Alan Kim Fowlkes (born August 8, 1958) is an American former professional baseball pitcher who played in Major League Baseball for the San Francisco Giants in 1982 and the California Angels in 1985.

Fowlkes played college baseball for the Cal Poly Pomona Broncos. In 1980, he won an NCAA record 21 games. He was inducted into the school's athletics hall of fame in 1992. The Giants drafted him in the 10th round of the 1980 MLB draft.

He was the first rookie pitcher to start a home opener in San Francisco, earning his first MLB in a victory over the San Diego Padres on April 13, 1982. After starting in his first 15 appearances, with a 5.56 ERA, he became a relief pitcher. He pitched twice in relief for the Angels in 1985, allowing seven runs in three innings in his final major league appearance on August 26, a blowout loss to the Baltimore Orioles. His professional career was limited by injuries, as he suffered shoulder tendinitis in 1982 and had a stress fracture in his throwing elbow in 1985. He continued playing in the minor leagues until 1989.

A decade after his previous MLB appearance, Fowlkes was a replacement player during spring training with the Detroit Tigers in 1995 during the ongoing players' strike.

In 1990, Fowlkes opened Putt-Putt Golf, a miniature golf and batting cage business in Lumberton, North Carolina. He also worked at a nearby Lowe's store.

Fowlkes met his wife in Hawaii while playing minor league baseball.
