= Fresno Giants =

American minor league baseball team

- 1941–1988; (1941–1942, 1946–1988); Fresno, California
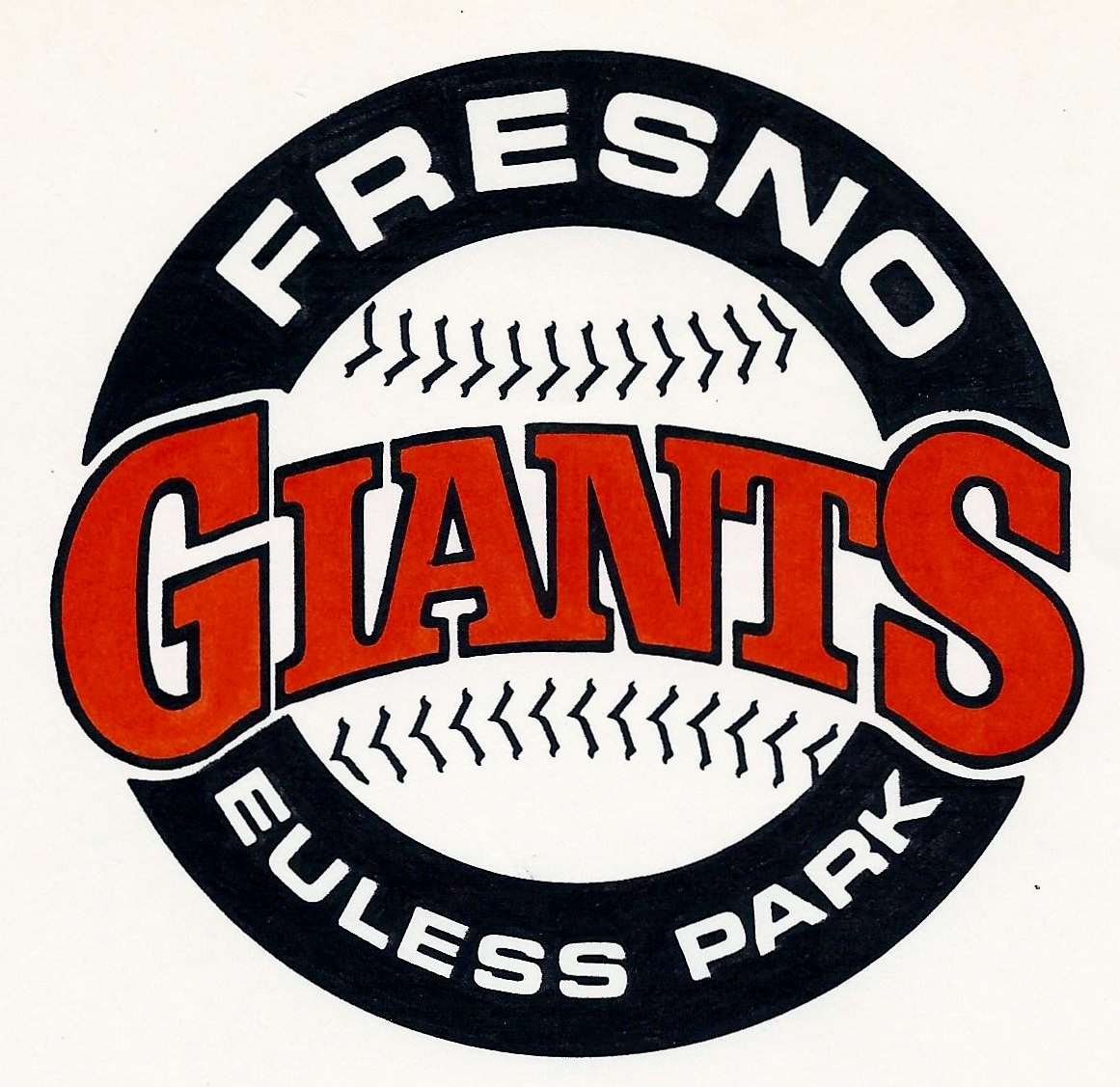

Minor league affiliations
- Class: Class A (1963–1988); Class C (1941–1942, 1946–1962)
- League: California League

Major league affiliations
- Team: San Francisco Giants (1958–1987); St. Louis Cardinals (1941–1942, 1946–1956)

Minor league titles
- League titles (9): 1952, 1955, 1956, 1958, 1964, 1968, 1974, 1985, 1987
- Division titles (6): 1941, 1948, 1949, 1971, 1980, 1984

Team data
- Name: Fresno Suns (1988); Fresno Giants (1958–1987); Fresno Sun Sox (1957); Fresno Cardinals (1941–1942, 1946–1956)
- Colors: Black, orange, white
- Ballpark: John Euless Park

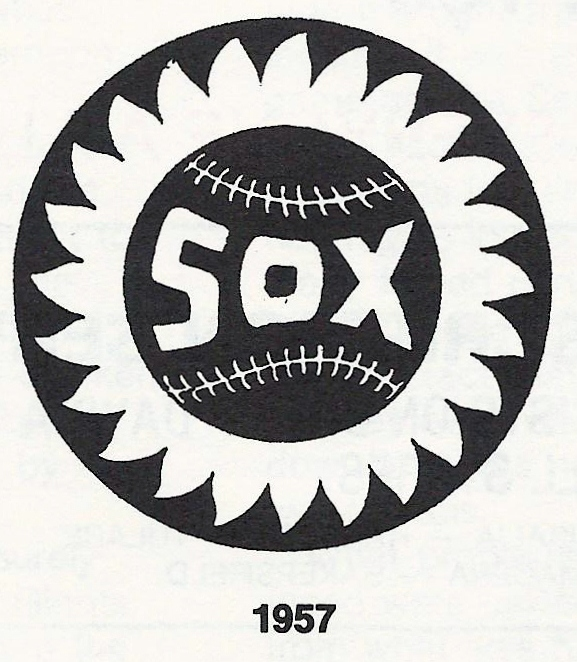
Fresno Sun Sox, 1957 logo

The Fresno Giants were a minor league baseball team that played in the California League from 1941 to 1988. The team was based in Fresno, California.

== First teams ==
The city of Fresno had professional baseball as far back as 1898 when it had a team in the original California League, then considered an "outlaw" league (i.e., outside the bounds of Organized Baseball). The team dropped out of the league after that year, but the California League returned in 1905 with the Fresno Tigers, joined late in the season by Fresno native and future hall of famer Frank Chance. In 1906, the Tacoma Tigers of the Pacific Coast League moved to Fresno, playing as the Fresno Raisin Eaters for one season. In 1910, Fresno rejoined the old California League, which had entered Organized Baseball as the Class "D" California State League, but the league folded during the season. When the league reorganized, Fresno rejoined it in 1913, finishing second in a four-team league. Fresno finished first in 1914, after which the team and league folded. Starting in 1905, these teams played at Recreation Park.

== Cardinals Affiliation ==
When the modern California League was founded in 1941 as a Class "C" minor league (equivalent to a Rookie-level league today), the Fresno Cardinals were a charter member, the others being the Anaheim Aces, Bakersfield Badgers, Merced Bears, Riverside Reds, San Bernardino Stars, Santa Barbara Saints, and Stockton Fliers. The Cards finished first, 6 1/2 games ahead of the Saints, but lost the playoffs to the Saints 4 games to 1. In 1942, they finished second in a season shortened by America's entry into World War II. The league suspended play for the 1943, 1944, and 1945 seasons. In 1946, the California League resumed operations. The Cardinals won pennants in 1948 and 1952.

In 1955, the Cardinals fielded one of the best teams in the history of minor league baseball, ranked the 79th best minor league team of all time by baseball historians Bill Weiss and Marshall Wright. It was one of only a handful of lower classification teams (i.e., Class A, B, C and D) to have been included in the top 100 minor league teams. The Cards finished 104–43 for a .707 won-lost percentage, 5 1/2 games ahead of the San Jose Red Sox for the season as a whole. The league played a split season schedule, though, and the Cards finished second, 2 1/2 games behind the Stockton Ports in the first half of the split season. In the second half, though Stockton faded, Fresno barely finished first, only one game over San Jose. In the playoffs, Fresno defeated Stockton 3 games to 1 to win the CL pennant. The 1955 Cardinals set league records for most runs (1,048), hits (1,500), and RBI (893) in a season. Their 104 games won and .707 winning percentage remain California League records to this day. The team won its last pennant in Fresno the following year, 1956.

The Fresno Cardinals had long been one of the league's more popular teams, due in large part to its affiliation with the major league Cardinals. Until 1955, St. Louis had been the major leagues' westernmost city, with the St. Louis Cardinals winning many fans in the western part of the United States as a result. In addition, a large percentage of the population of Fresno and the surrounding area consisted of transplants from the states of Oklahoma, Missouri, Texas, and Arkansas, who arrived with a natural affinity for the Cardinals.

The televising of major league baseball games and other factors began taking its toll on minor league attendance during the 1950s, with many teams and entire leagues folding as a result. Scaling back their minor league operations, the St. Louis Cardinals sold their Fresno club after the 1956 season to the Greater Fresno Youth Foundation and ended their affiliation with the team. In 1957 the team, now known as the Fresno Sun Sox, operated without a major league affiliation, and finished last. Jerry Zuvela was the team captain.

In 2010, the Fresno Cardinals, a collegiate summer baseball team was founded.

== Giants Affiliation ==
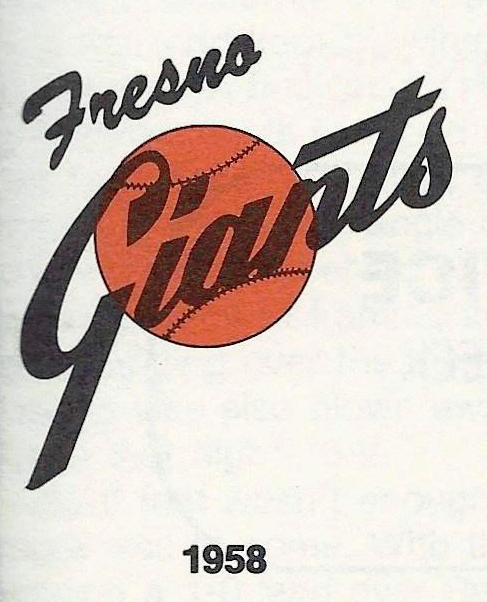
1958–1984 logo

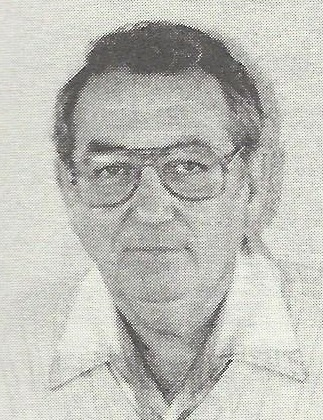
Bill Thompson in 1984

In 1958, the team entered into a working agreement with the San Francisco Giants, who had moved from New York the previous winter, and were renamed the Fresno Giants, winning the California League pennant in their inaugural year.

In 1963, the entire minor league system was reorganized, with the California League granted Class A status for the first time. As a Class A team, the Fresno Giants won championships in 1964, 1968, 1974, 1985 and 1987. With the 1987 championship, Fresno tied Modesto for most California League championships (9) up to that time in the history of the league. On August 8, 1985, Fresno became the first California League franchise to win 3,000 games (Source: Bill Weiss). Fresno hosted the California League All-Star game in 1986 and 1987 at Euless Park.

The Greater Fresno Youth Foundation operated the Fresno Giants and hosted an annual hot stove league dinner in the winter. The San Francisco Giants, Oakland A's, Los Angeles Dodgers and other teams sent players and coaches to the dinner regularly as part of their winter hot stove league tours. The Greater Fresno Youth Foundation had two general managers during the time it owned the team. Tom McGurn ran the ballclub (source: Fresno Bee death notice, October 24, 1989, retrieved July 11, 2014) from 1957 to 1978. In those days, running a minor league baseball operation was a one-man job. Bill Thompson, who had formerly teamed with Russ Hodges and Lon Simmons announcing San Francisco Giants radio broadcasts from 1965 to 1975, was hired as general manager in 1978 and was there when the Greater Fresno Youth Foundation sold the team to Modesto-based Save Mart Supermarkets president Bob Piccinini in 1982. As minor league operations became more sophisticated and required more management, Piccinini and Thompson hired an assistant general manager, Curt Goldgrabe in 1983, and later Brian Pickering in 1987. Thompson remained general manager until Piccinini sold the Fresno franchise following the 1987 season. (In 1999, Piccinini led an unsuccessful attempt to buy the Oakland A's.)

An account of the rest of the ownership story of the Fresno Giants is found in a Fresno Bee sports article from September 13, 1988: ″Piccinini sold the team to Bill Yuill, a Canadian media mogul, for a reported $560,000 on September 15, 1987. After the 46-year-old Euless grandstand was condemned because of structural defects and the team lost its long working agreement with the San Francisco Giants, Yuill reportedly sold it to Dave Kramer, a Van Nuys businessman, for $615,000 in 1988.

Kramer suffered major financial losses as the team was forced to rent portable bleachers and trailers to house its dressing rooms, concessions and offices at Euless. In addition, the Fresno Suns operated as a co-op, with players supplied by several major league clubs and the Hanshin Tigers of Japan.″

Up to 1988, Fresno and the San Francisco Giants held the longest continuous working agreement in all of minor league baseball, 30 years. Without a working agreement, operating independently as the Fresno Suns in 1988, and lacking an adequate park, the team finished near the bottom of the standings and drew only 34,734 patrons, less than half the league average. The franchise was bought by Joe Buzas, who moved it to Salinas for the 1989 season.

Minor league baseball returned to Fresno in 1998, when the owners of the Tucson Toros of the AAA Pacific Coast League moved their franchise to Fresno and renamed it the Fresno Grizzlies, where it once again became a San Francisco Giants affiliate. Grizzlies games were played at Pete Beiden Field on the Fresno State campus until a new downtown ballpark, Chukchansi Park, was finished for the 2002 season.

== Ballpark ==
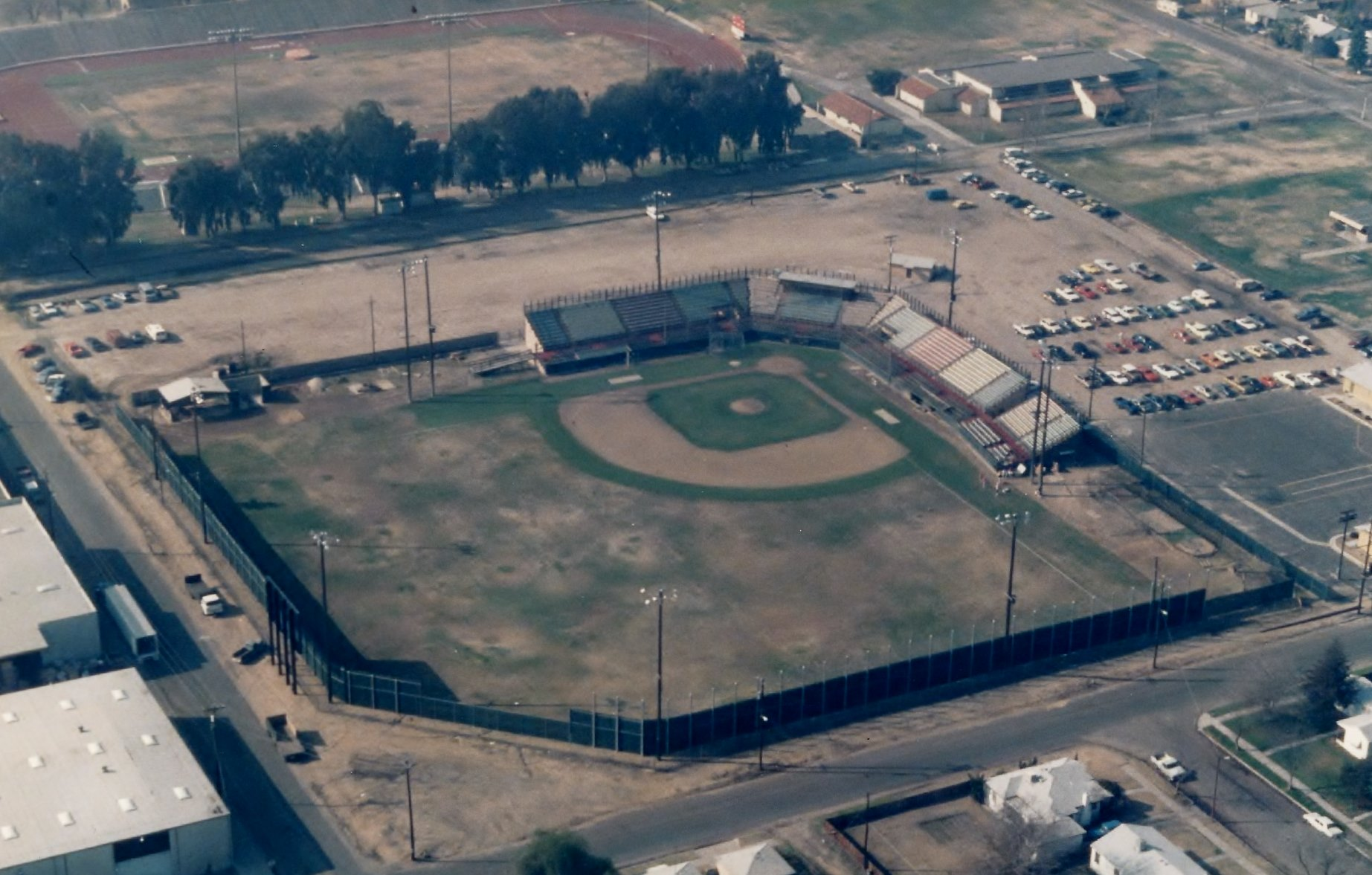
Euless Park aerial view, Spring 1987

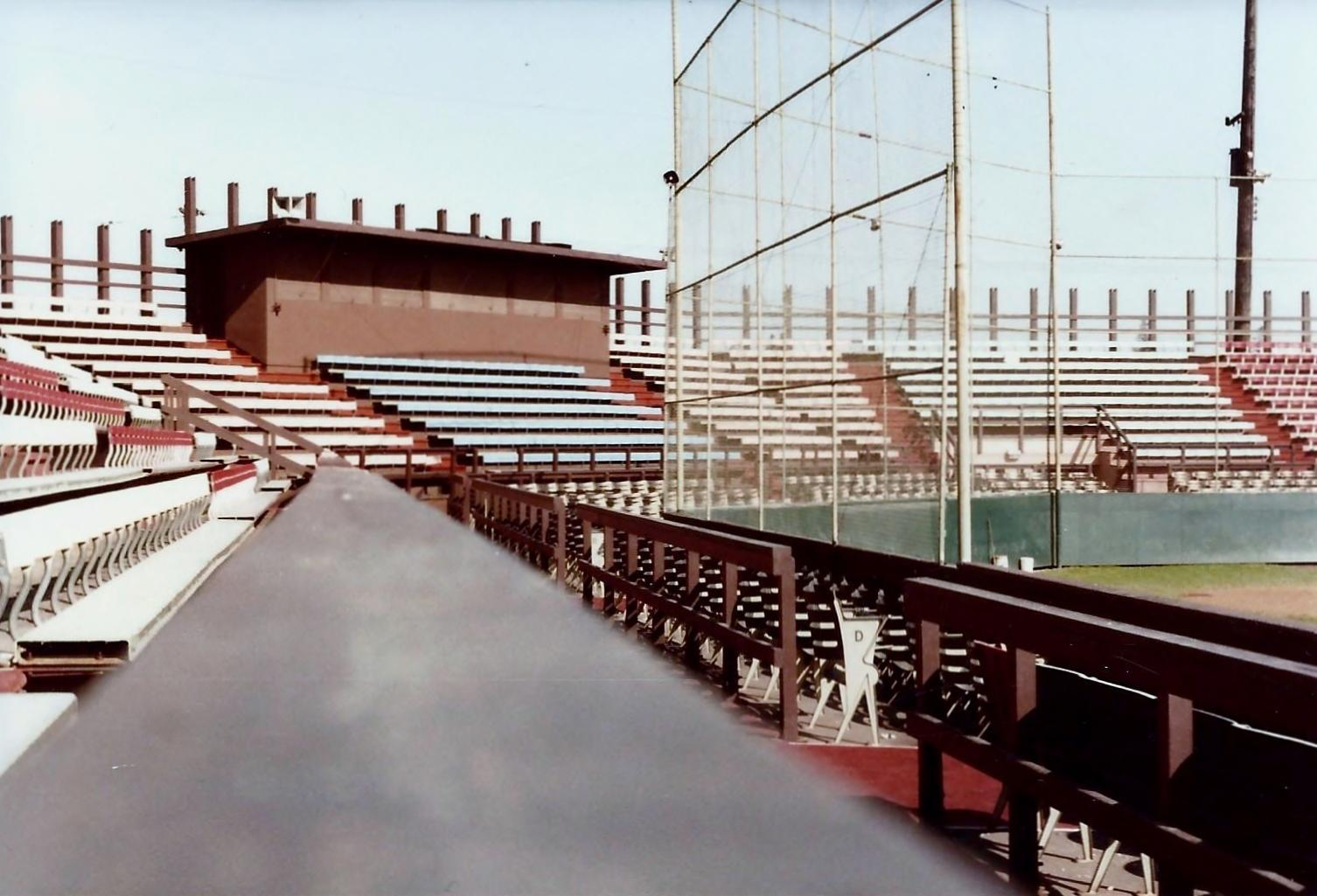
John Euless Park stands in 1984

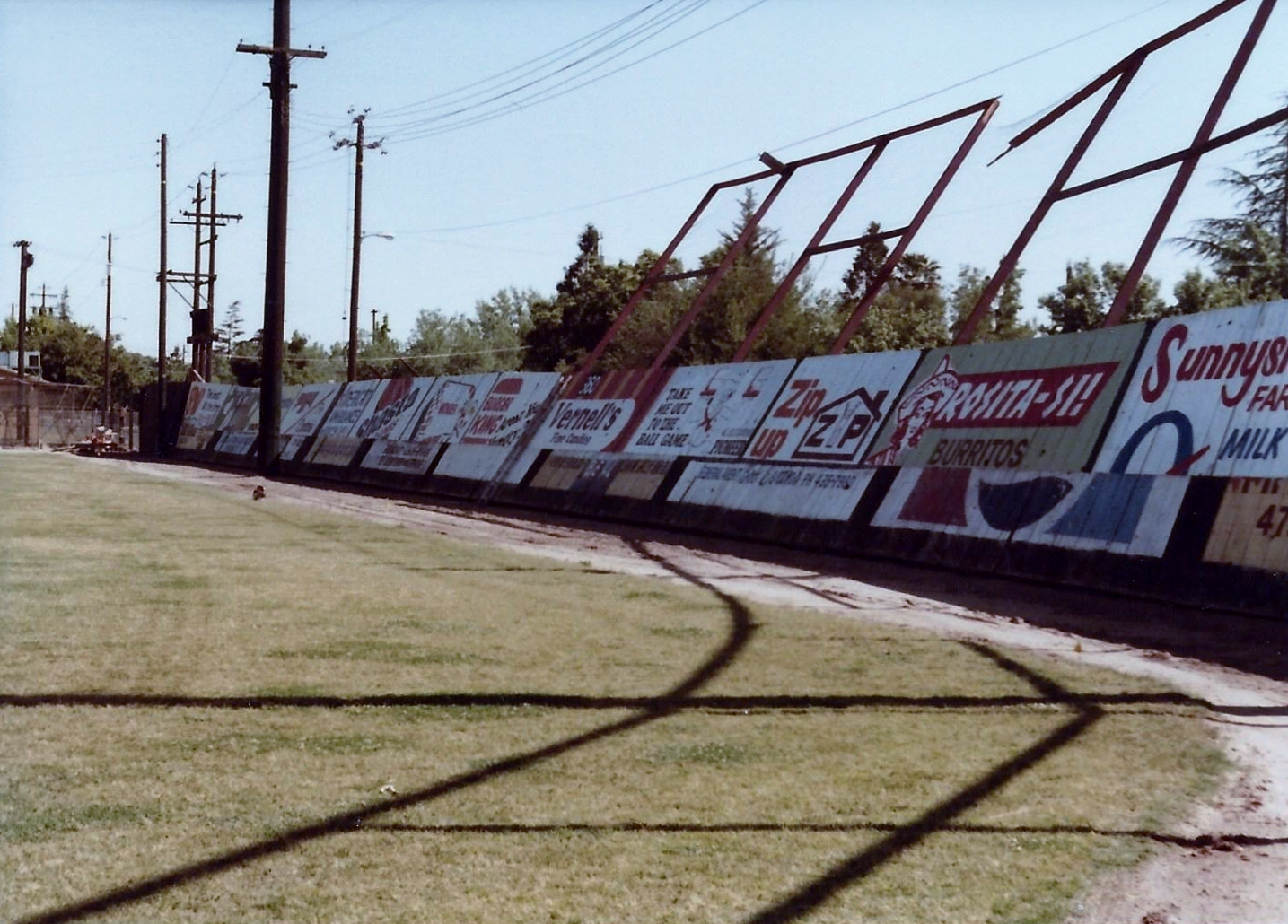
Left field fence after windstorm on April 24, 1984.

The home of minor league baseball in Fresno was originally called Cardinal Field in 1941–42. Grandstands seating 2,600 were built on the site during World War II (source: Fresno Bee, May 20, 1984, retrieved May 19, 2014) to host the Fresno Cardinals on the campus of what was known then as Fresno State College, and was called Fresno State College Park from 1946 to 1957.

After the Cardinals affiliation ended in 1957, the name was changed to John Euless Park for John Euless, a local proponent of professional baseball who was associated with the Greater Fresno Youth Foundation and instrumental in keeping pro baseball in Fresno by leading the charge to build the ballpark. Euless came to Fresno in 1906 from Tennessee and was very involved in the city. He worked for real estate and insurance companies, helped start an oil enterprise in the Coalinga district, and advocated for local grape growers in Washington, D.C. (Source: Fresno Bee 7/02/2014)

In 1956, Fresno State moved its campus to its present location in the northeast part of the city, and Fresno City College bought the old campus.

It seemed the beginning of the end of the ballpark started on April 24, 1984 when a gust of wind blew down the left field fence two hours before the start of a game (source: Fresno Bee, April 25, 1984, retrieved May 19, 2014), the same day a 6.1 earthquake hit northern California. Then, the next night, a transformer blew during a game, knocking out the lights and cancelling two games against the Reno Padres (source: Fresno Bee, April 27, 1984, retrieved May 19, 2014). The State Center Community College District, now owner of the ballpark, made an emergency allocation of $42,136 to finance repairs to the outfield fence during a meeting on Tuesday May 1, 1984, and repairs were completed about a month later (Source: Fresno Bee, May 3, 1984, retrieved June 9, 2014). At the same time, Euless Park received a new scoreboard and new field lights, which were installed by July 14, 1984 (Source: Fresno Bee, July 15, 1984, retrieved June 9, 2014).

Constructed entirely of wood, the stadium grandstands were intended to be a temporary structure, but continued in its mostly original form until the stands were bulldozed due to structural defects (thought to be termite damage) in the spring of 1988. (Source: Fresno Bee column by Bob McCarthy, September 7, 1988, retrieved June 9, 2014)

Fresno City College baseball teams still use this facility for home games today. The ballpark is adjacent to FCC's Ratcliffe football stadium and across Blackstone Avenue from the current Fresno City College campus.

== Notable alumni ==
The following is an alphabetical list of Fresno players and coaches who played or coached in the major leagues. The year played in Fresno is listed after the name.

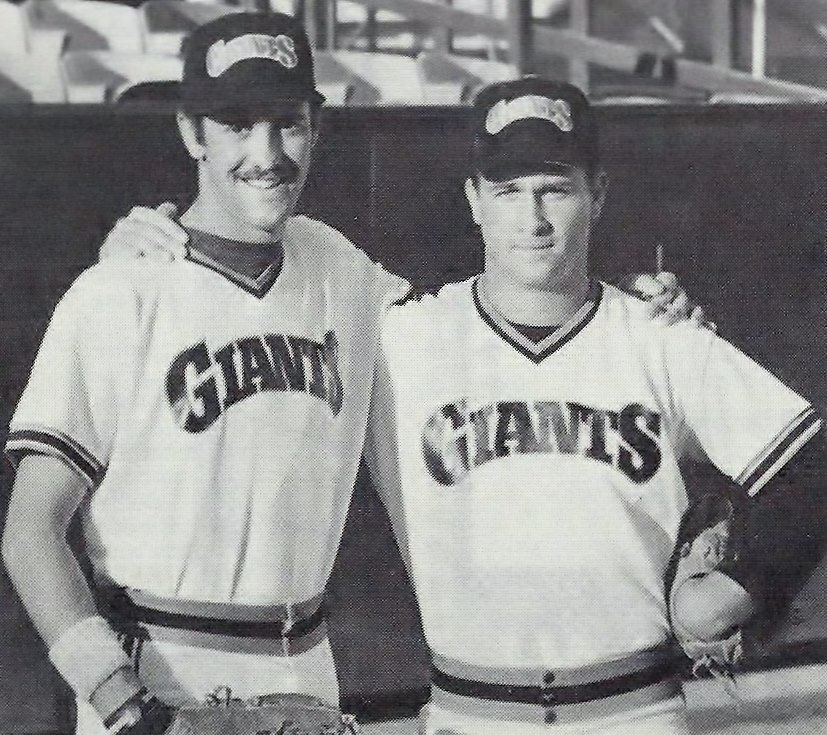
Will Clark and Jeff Brantley were teammates at Mississippi State before being drafted by the San Francisco Giants and sent to Fresno in 1985.

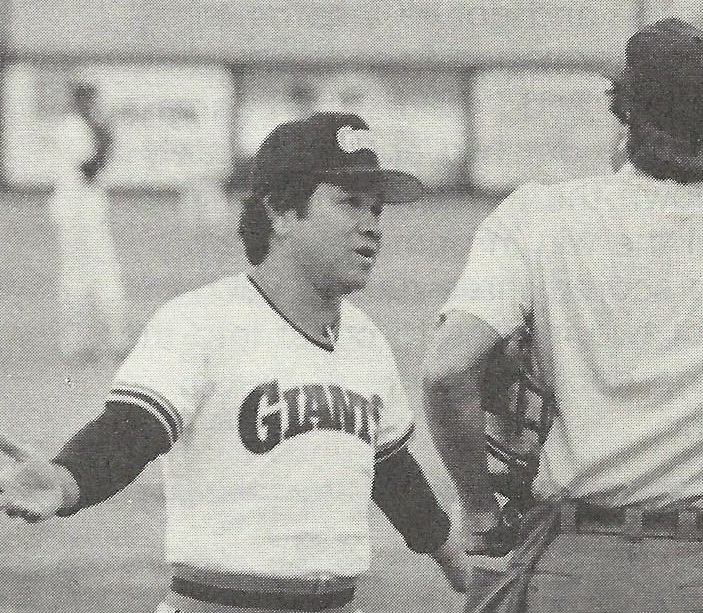
Wendell Kim played for the Fresno Giants in 1974 and was their manager 1983–85.

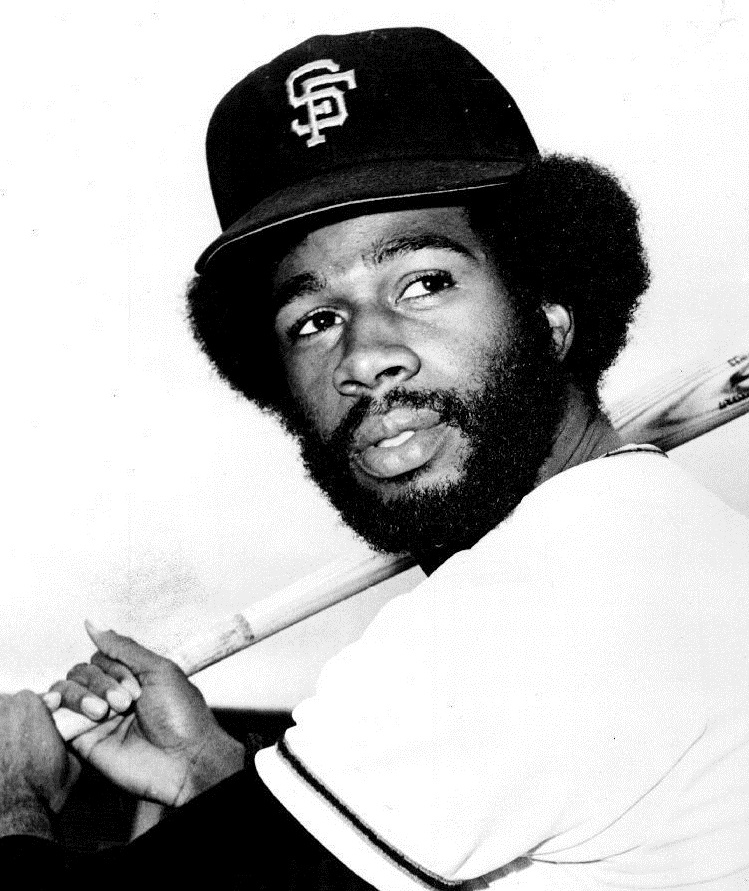
Garry Maddox 1974

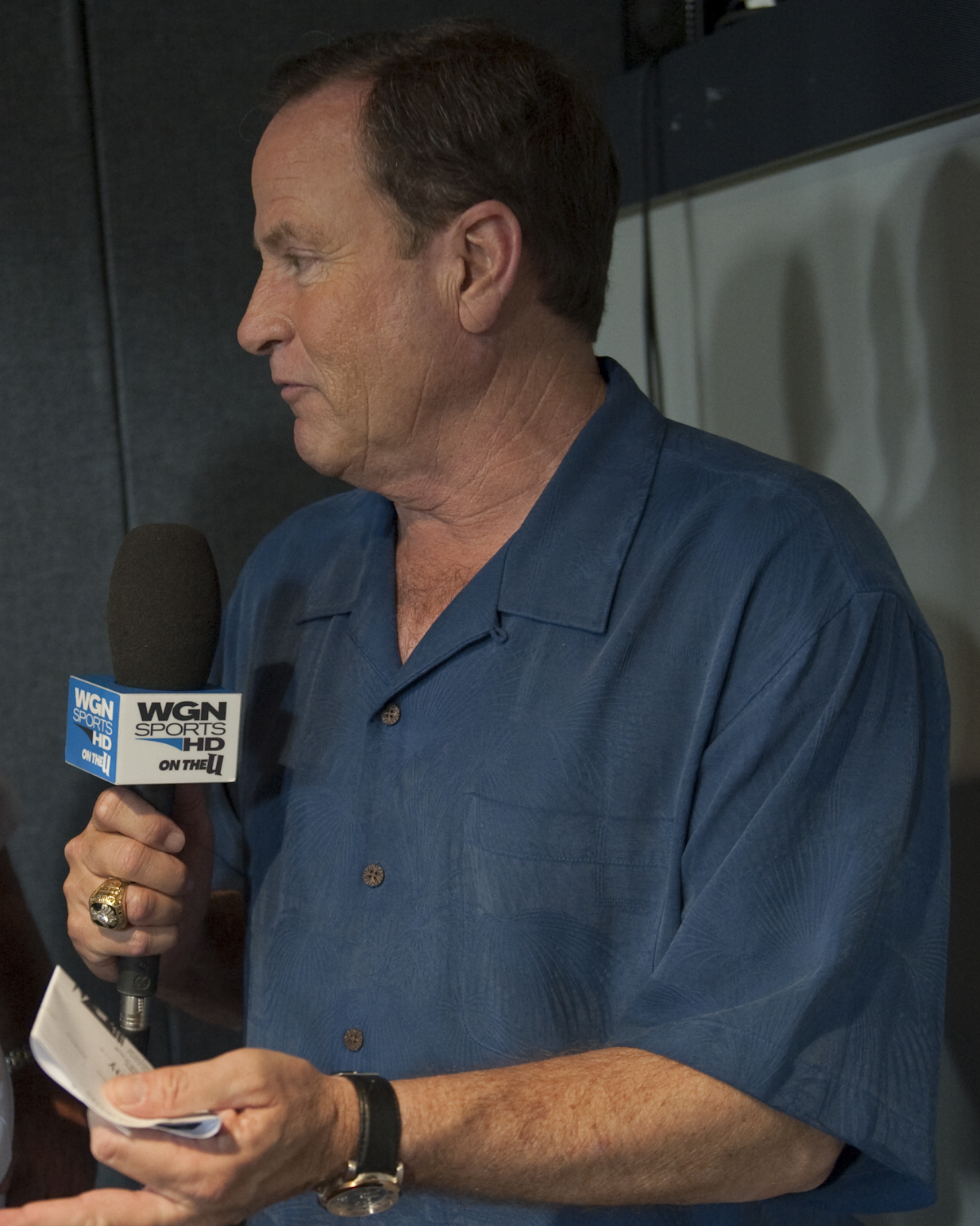
Steve Stone

- Mike Aldrete (1983–84)
- Gary Alexander (1974)
- Chris Arnold (1967–68)
- Mike Benjamin (1987)*
- Jose Barrios (1977)
- Bob Barton (1960)
- Randy Bockus (1983)
- Bobby Bonds (1965–66)
- Chris Bourjos (1977)
- Jeff Brantley (1985)
- Bob Brenly (1976, 78–79)
- Chris Brown (1981–82)
- Jake Brown (1969–70)
- Ollie Brown (1964)
- DeWayne Buice (1979–80)
- Ron Bryant (1967)
- John Burkett(1985–86)
- Mark Calvert (1978)
- Doug Capilla (1973)
- Don Carrithers (1968)
- Tom Cheney (1954)
- Joseph Cherry (1985)
- Jack Clark (1974)
- Will Clark (1985)
- Alan Cockrell (1984)
- Craig Colbert (1987)
- Dennis Cook (1986)
- Mike Corkins (1966–67)
- Terry Cornutt (1973–74)
- John D'Acquisto (1972)
- Dick Dietz (1960)
- Chili Davis (1979),
- Rob Deer (1981)
- Mike Eden (1973)
- Ángel Escobar (1985)
- Dick Estelle (1961)
- Bobby Etheridge (1965)
- Pete Falcone (1974)
- Bob Farley (1958)
- Bob Fenwick (1968)
- Ed Figueroa (1970–71)
- Ed Fitz Gerald (1965–66)
- George Foster (1969)
- Alan Fowlkes (1980)
- Bill Frost (1966)
- Frank Funk (1972–73)
- Al Gallagher (1966)
- Dave Garcia (1967–68)
- Gil Garrido (1960)
- Dan Gladden (1979–80),
- Randy Gomez (1981)
- Ed Goodson (1970)
- Gene Green (1953)
- César Gutiérrez (1966)
- Don Hahn (1968)
- Ed Halicki (1973)
- Bill Hands (1960)
- Alan Hargesheimer (1978)
- John Harrell (1970),
- Jim Ray Hart (1961)
- Charlie Hayes (1985)
- Dave Heaverlo (1973)
- Ken Henderson (1964)
- Ron Herbel (1958)
- Gil Heredia (1987)
- Randy Hundley (1961–62)
- Larry Jackson (1952)
- Skip James (1972)
- Jim Johnson (1967)
- John Henry Johnson (1977)
- Greg Johnson (1976)
- Buddy Kerr (1960)
- Wendell Kim (player 1974, manager 1983-84-85)
- Jim King (1951–52)
- Joe Kmak (1986–87)
- Bob Knepper (1973–74)
- Randy Kutcher (1981)
- Coco Laboy (1959–60)
- Hal Lanier (1962)
- Mike Lee (1959)
- Johnnie LeMaster (1974)
- Dennis Littlejohn (1976)
- Greg Litton (1985)
- Garry Maddox (1968, 71)
- Jim Maloney (manager 1982)
- Gary Matthews (1970)
- Randy McCament (1986)
- Mike McCormick (manager 1958–59)
- John McNamara (1951)
- Greg Minton (1974), Randy Moffitt (1970)
- Jose Morales (1965)
- Terry Mulholland (1984)
- Masanori Murakami (1964)
- Matt Nokes (1983)
- Tom O'Malley (1980)
- Steve Ontiveros (1971)
- Phil Ouellette (1983)
- Casey Parsons (1976)
- Gil Patterson (1982)
- Tony Perezchica (1986)
- Cap Peterson (1960)
- Mike Phillips (1970)
- Skip Pitlock (1969)
- Ed Plank (1974–75)
- Willie Prall (1972)
- John Pregenzer (1961)
- Miguel Puente (1968)
- Luis Quintana (1973)
- John Rabb (1980)
- Dave Rader (1967–68)
- Jeff Ransom (1978–79)
- Jessie Reid (1981-82-85)
- Rip Repulski (1948)
- Bob Reynolds (1966)
- Jeff Robinson (1983)
- Jimmy Rosario (1966)
- Rafael Robles (1968)
- Minnie Rojas (1961)
- Mike Rowland (1975)
- Vic Roznovsky (1960)
- Tom Runnells (1978)
- Gary Ryerson (1967–68)
- Roger Samuels (1987)
- Mackey Sasser (1984–85)
- Wally Shannon (1952)
- Elías Sosa (1970–71)
- Horace Speed (1971)
- Steve Stanicek (1982–83)
- Steve Stone (1969)
- Joe Strain (1977)
- Steve Stroughter (1973–75)
- Guy Sularz (1975–76)
- Russ Swan (1987)
- Shin-Ming Tan (1974)
- Stu Tate (1985)
- Bob Taylor (1964)
- Robby Thompson (1983–84)
- Tommy Toms (1973)
- Héctor Torres (1963–64)
- Frenchy Uhalt (1949)
- Reggie Walton (1974)
- Bill Werle (manager 1963–64, 69–70)
- Bernie Williams (1968)
- Frank Williams (1980–81)
- Jim Willoughby (1968–69)
- Neil Wilson (1958)
- Alan Wirth (1976)

The 1988 Fresno Suns players who played in the major leagues.

- Ralph Citarella
- Julio Cruz
- Dwayne Murphy
- Mike Richardt
- Andy Rincon
- Terry Whitfield

== Individual awards ==
Fresno players and coaches who received California League or significant Major League Baseball awards.

=== California League Awards ===
Most Valuable Player: 1946 Tommy Glaviano, 1952 Larry Jackson, 1958 O'Neil Wilson, 1964 Ollie Brown, 1972 Skip James, 1974 Gary Alexander, 1986 Ty Dabney

Pitcher of the Year: 1985 Charlie Corbell

Rookie of the Year: 1949 John Romonosky, 1956 Nelson Chittum, 1964 Masanori Murakami, 1974 Jack Clark, 1986 Ty Dabney

Manager of the Year: 1955 Roland LeBlanc, 1956 Ed Lyons, 1964 Bill Werle, 1968 Dave Garcia, 1974 John Van Ornum, 1980 Jack Mull, 1985 Wendell Kim

=== Major League Baseball Awards ===
National League Most Valuable Player: George Foster, 1977 Cincinnati Reds

Gold Glove Winners: Randy Hundley, Chicago Cubs 1967, Bobby Bonds, San Francisco 1973–74, Garry Maddox, Philadelphia 1975-76-77-78-79-80-81-82, Dwayne Murphy, Oakland 1980-81-82-83-84-85, Will Clark, San Francisco 1991, Robby Thompson, San Francisco 1993

Rolaids Relief Man Award: Jeff Brantley, Cincinnati 1996

Roberto Clemente Award: Garry Maddox, Philadelphia 1986

Major League Baseball Rookie of the Year Award: Gary Matthews, San Francisco 1973

Silver Slugger Award: George Foster, Cincinnati 1981, Jack Clark, St. Louis 1985 & 1987, Matt Nokes, Detroit 1987, Will Clark, San Francisco 1989 & 1991, Robby Thompson, San Francisco 1993

National League Manager of the Year: Hal Lanier, 1986 Houston Astros

=== San Francisco Giants Wall of Famers ===
Former Fresno Giants in bold.

Felipe Alou	Gary Lavelle	Jim Barr	**Johnnie LeMaster**	Willie Mays
Rod Beck	Jeffrey Leonard	Vida Blue	Kirt Manwaring	Willie McCovey
Bobby Bolin	Juan Marichal	**Jeff Brantley**	**Jack Clark**	Mike McCormick
**Bob Brenly**	**John Burkett**	Stu Miller	**Bobby Bonds**	Orlando Cepeda
**Randy Moffitt**	**Greg Minton**	Kevin Mitchell	**Will Clark**	Mike Krukow
Jim Davenport	John Montefusco	**Chili Davis**	Matt Williams	Robb Nen
**Dick Dietz**	Gaylord Perry	Darrell Evans	**Jim Ray Hart**	Rick Reuschel
J. T. Snow	Tito Fuentes	Kirk Rueter	Scott Garrelts	**Robby Thompson**
Tom Haller	Chris Speier	Atlee Hammaker	Jeff Kent	Rich Aurilia
Shawn Estes	Marvin Benard	Jason Schmidt		

== Yearly Records ==
Year	Name	Won	Lost	PCT	GBL	Place	Manager	Notes
1898	Fresno							
1905	Fresno							
1906	Raisin Eaters						Mike Fisher	
1908	Tigers							
1909	Raisin Growers							
1910	Tigers						William McDonough	
1913	Packers					2nd	George Wheeler	
1914	Tigers					1st	George Wheeler	(Old Fresno records show unconfirmed championship)
1941	Cardinals	90	50	.643	–	1st	George Silvey	Lost to Santa Barbara Saints in championship series 4–1
1942	Cardinals	34	33	.507	9	3rd	Lou Scoffic	League disbanded June 29, 1942
1943–45	No Team							
1946	Cardinals	58	72	.446	20	5th	Everett Johnston, Paul Bowa	
1947	Cardinals	58	82	.414	37	7th	Frank Demaree, Wm. Harris, Chas. Baron, Wm. Brenzel	
1948	Cardinals	85	55	.607	–	1st	Stan Benjamin	Lost to Santa Barbara Dodgers in semifinal series 3–2
1949	Cardinals	83	57	.593	2.5	2nd	Frenchy Uhalt	Lost to San Jose Red Sox in semifinal series 3–0
1950	Cardinals	58	82	.414	27	7th	Roland LeBlanc	
1951	Cardinals	61	86	.414	27	7th	Larry Barton	
1952	Cardinals	88	52	.629	–	1st	Roland LeBlanc	Won championship series vs. San Jose Red Sox 4–2
1953	Cardinals	64	77	.454	29	6th	Roland LeBlanc	
1954	Cardinals	73	67	.521	15	5th	James Hercinger	
1955	Cardinals	53	23	.697	3	2nd	Roland LeBlanc	Won championship series vs. Stockton Ports 3–1
		51	20	.718	–	1st		Fresno and Cal League record for most wins in a season (104)
1956	Cardinals	91	49	.650	–	1st	Ed Lyons	Won championship series vs. Stockton Ports 3–1
1957	Sun Sox	27	44	.380	16	7th	Roland LeBlanc	Unaffiliated
		25	42	.373	16	8th		LeBlanc won 366 games as a Fresno manager—most in Fresno history.
1958	Giants	46	26	.639	–	1st	Mike McCormick	Won championship series vs. Visalia Redlegs 3–1
		39	29	.574	6.5	2nd		
1959	Giants	21	49	.300	21.5	6th	Mike McCormick	Fresno record for most losses in a season (96)
		23	47	.329	22	6th		
1960	Giants	38	32	.543	5	3rd	Buddy Kerr	
		37	33	.529	9	3rd		
1961	Giants	37	33	.529	16	3rd	Salvador Taormina	
		37	33	.529	14	4th		
1962	Giants	35	38	.479	14.5	4th	Salvador Taormina	
		32	34	.485	6.5	6th		
1963	Giants	38	35	.521	5	3rd	Bill Werle	
		35	32	.522	11	3rd		
1964	Giants	44	25	.638	–	1st	Bill Werle	Won championship—no playoff series
		42	28	.600	–	1st		
1965	Giants	36	33	.522	4.5	3rd	Ed Fitz Gerald	
		34	36	.486	9	3rd		
1966	Giants	39	31	.557	2	3rd	Ed Fitz Gerald	
		35	35	.500	12	3rd		
1967	Giants	35	35	.500	11	4th	Dave Garcia	
		32	37	.464	9	5th		
1968	Giants	36	34	.514	8	4th	Dave Garcia	Won championship series vs. San Jose Bees 2–1
		43	26	.623	–	1st		
1969	Giants	38	32	.543	4	2nd	Bill Werle	
		34	36	.486	9	4th		
1970	Giants	36	33	.522	10	4th	Bill Werle, Dennis Sommers	Werle won 302 games as Fresno manager—second-most in Fresno history
		35	35	.500	12	5th		
1971	Giants	42	28	.600	–	1st	Dennis Sommers	Lost to Visalia Mets in championship series 2–0
		28	42	.400	18	7th		
1972	Giants	34	34	.500	14	4th	Frank Funk	
		40	30	.571	5	2nd		
1973	Giants	34	36	.486	12	4th	Frank Funk	
		35	35	.500	5	4th		
1974	Giants	48	22	.686	–	1st	John Van Ornum	Won championship series vs. San Jose Bees 3–2
		37	33	.529	8	4th		
1975	Giants	37	33	.529	6	2nd	John Van Ornum	
		37	33	.529	6	3rd		
1976	Giants	41	29	.586	8	2nd	Andy Gilbert	
		36	34	.514	7.5	3rd		
1977	Giants	41	29	.586	8	2nd	John Van Ornum	
		42	28	.600	6	2nd		
1978	Giants	32	37	.464	19	3rd	John Van Ornum	
		27	43	.386	19	3rd		Van Ornum won 301 games as Fresno manager—third-most in Fresno history.
1979	Giants	34	36	.486	10	4th	Jack Mull	
		32	37	.464	16.5	4th		
1980	Giants	37	33	.529	–	1st	Jack Mull	Lost to Visalia Oaks in divisional series 2–0
		37	33	.529	7	3rd		
1981	Giants	37	33	.529	7	3rd	Wayne Cato	
		26	44	.371	18	7th		
1982	Giants	25	45	.357	16	5th	Jim Maloney	
		25	45	.357	16	5th		
1983	Giants	37	33	.529	8	2nd	Wendell Kim	
		41	29	.586	1	2nd		
1984	Giants	43	27	.614	–	1st	Wendell Kim	Lost to Bakersfield Dodgers in divisional series 2–1
		39	31	.557	1	2nd		
1985	Giants	35	37	.486	15.5	2nd	Wendell Kim	Won championship series vs. Stockton Ports 3–2
		49	25	.662	–	1st		
1986	Giants	37	34	.521	11	3rd	Tim Blackwell	
		29	42	.408	14	4th		
1987	Giants	41	30	.577	–	1st	R. J. Harrison	Beat Bakersfield Dodgers in 1 game playoff to win 1st half
		39	33	.541	–	1st		Won championship series vs. Reno Padres 4–3
1988	Suns	27	44	.380	20.5	4th	Dean Treanor	Unaffiliated
		26	45	.366	20	3rd		Set Cal League record of 20 straight losses in 2nd half. (source: Fresno Bee Sept. 1, 1988, retrieved June 9, 2014.)
