= Lodi Crushers =

Information
- League: Great West League (2016)
- Location: Lodi, California
- Ballpark: Tony Zupo Field
- Founded: 2015
- Folded: 2017; 8 years ago
- League championships: 0
- Division championships: 0
- Former name(s): Lodi Crushers (2016)
- Former league(s): None
- Colors: Purple, Lime Green and White
- Ownership: Wine Country Baseball
- General manager: Doug Leary
- Manager: TBA (head coach)
- Website: lodicrushers.com

The Lodi Crushers were a collegiate woodbat baseball team based in Lodi, California. They were charter members of the Great West League and played their home games at Tony Zupo Field in Lodi. The team was owned by Wine Country Baseball and was run by general manager Doug Leary. They were named for the original California League minor league franchise now known as the Rancho Cucamonga Quakes.

The team has gone dormant for 2017.
