= Tony Zupo Field =

- Interactive map of Tony Zupo Field
- Former names: Lawrence Park
- Location: Lawrence Avenue and Washington Street, Lodi, California
- Coordinates: 38.139826°N 121.266768°W
- Operator: Lodi Parks & Recreation
- Capacity: 3,000
- Surface: Natural grass
- Field size: Left Field: Center Field: Right Field:

Construction
- Opened: 1924

Tenants
- Lodi Guild Wines 1946-2000; Lodi Crushers (CL) 1966–69, 1984; Lodi Padres (CL) 1970–71; Lodi Orions (CL) 1972; Lodi Lions (CL) 1973; Lodi Orioles (CL) 1974–75; Lodi Dodgers (CL) 1976–83; Lodi Crushers (GWL) 2015–16

Tony Zupo Field, originally known as Lawrence Park, is a stadium in Lodi, California. It was primarily used for baseball and was the home of various versions of the Lodi Crushers, first in the California League from 1966 to 1969 and again in 1984 and later the collegiate wood bat Great West League in 2016. The ballpark has a capacity of 3,000 people.

== Fire ==
On September 23, 2019, the main grandstands and press box of Tony Zupo Field were destroyed in a fire. At the time, the damage was extensive, but the city and community were in hope of getting the destroyed area demolished and rebuilt in time for baseball season.
