= 1958 California League season =

- League: California League
- Sport: Baseball
- Duration: April 22 – September 7
- Games: 140
- Teams: 8

Regular season
- League champions: Fresno Giants
- Season MVP: Neil Wilson, Fresno Giants

Playoffs
- League champions: Fresno Giants
- Runners-up: Visalia Redlegs

CALL seasons
- ← 1957 1959 →

The 1958 California League was a Class C baseball season played between April 22 and September 7. Eight teams played a 140-game schedule, as the top four teams qualified for the playoffs.

The Fresno Giants won the California League championship, defeating the Visalia Redlegs in the final round of the playoffs.

== Team changes ==
- The Bakersfield Bears ended their affiliation with the Chicago Cubs and began a new affiliation with the Philadelphia Phillies.
- The Fresno Sun Sox began an affiliation with the San Francisco Giants. The club was renamed to the Fresno Giants.
- The San Jose JoSox were renamed to the San Jose Pirates. The club remained affiliated with the Pittsburgh Pirates.
- The Stockton Ports began an affiliation with the St. Louis Cardinals.

== Teams ==
1958 California League
| Team | City | MLB Affiliate | Stadium |
| Bakersfield Bears | Bakersfield, California | Philadelphia Phillies | Sam Lynn Ballpark |
| Fresno Giants | Fresno, California | San Francisco Giants | John Euless Park |
| Modesto Reds | Modesto, California | New York Yankees | Del Webb Field |
| Reno Silver Sox | Reno, Nevada | Los Angeles Dodgers | Moana Stadium |
| Salinas Packers | Salinas, California | Milwaukee Braves | Salinas Municipal Stadium |
| San Jose Pirates; Las Vegas Wranglers | San Jose, California; Las Vegas, Nevada | Pittsburgh Pirates | San Jose Municipal Stadium; Cashman Field |
| Stockton Ports | Stockton, California | St. Louis Cardinals | Billy Hebert Field |
| Visalia Redlegs | Visalia, California | Cincinnati Redlegs | Recreation Ballpark |

== Map of teams ==
California League Teams

== Regular season ==
=== Summary ===
- The Fresno Giants finished with the best record in the regular season for the first time since 1956.
- On May 26, the San Jose Pirates relocated to Las Vegas, Nevada and were renamed to the Las Vegas Wranglers.

=== Standings ===
California League
| Team | Win | Loss | % | GB |
|---|---|---|---|---|
| Fresno Giants | 85 | 55 | .607 | – |
| Bakersfield Bears | 84 | 55 | .604 | 0.5 |
| Stockton Ports | 70 | 68 | .507 | 14 |
| Visalia Redlegs | 69 | 69 | .500 | 15 |
| Modesto Reds | 69 | 70 | .496 | 15.5 |
| Reno Silver Sox | 68 | 69 | .496 | 15.5 |
| San Jose Pirates / Las Vegas Wranglers | 54 | 81 | .400 | 28.5 |
| Salinas Packers | 53 | 85 | .384 | 31 |

== League Leaders ==
=== Batting leaders ===
| Stat | Player | Total |
|---|---|---|
| AVG | Thomas Humber, Reno Silver Sox | .378 |
| H | Neil Wilson, Fresno Giants | 191 |
| R | Bob Farley, Fresno Giants | 128 |
| 2B | Neil Wilson, Fresno Giants | 50 |
| 3B | Bill Fox, Reno Silver Sox | 16 |
| HR | Barton Dupon, Bakersfield Bears | 40 |
| RBI | Barton Dupon, Bakersfield Bears | 136 |
| SB | Bernard Kelly, Stockton Ports | 50 |

=== Pitching leaders ===
| Stat | Player | Total |
|---|---|---|
| W | Leonardo Ferguson, Modesto Reds | 23 |
| ERA | Alvin Spearman, Stockton Ports | 2.60 |
| CG | Alvin Spearman, Stockton Ports | 28 |
| SHO | Jim Hansen, Stockton Ports | 4 |
| IP | Leonardo Ferguson, Modesto Reds | 291.0 |
| SO | Leonardo Ferguson, Modesto Reds | 302 |

== Playoffs ==
- The semi-finals were changed to 1 vs. 3 and 2 vs. 4.
- The Fresno Giants won their fourth California League championship, defeating the Visalia Redlegs in four games.

=== Playoff bracket ===
Semi-finals
1 | Fresno | 2
3 | Stockton | 1
2 | Bakersfield | 1
4 | Visalia | 2

Finals
1 | Fresno | 3
4 | Visalia | 1

== Awards ==
California League awards
| Award name | Recipient |
|---|---|
| Most Valuable Player | Neil Wilson, Fresno Giants |

== See also ==
- 1958 Major League Baseball season
