= 1975 California League season =

- League: California League
- Sport: Baseball
- Duration: April 15 – August 31
- Games: 140
- Teams: 8

Regular season
- League champions: Reno Silver Sox
- Season MVP: Gene Richards, Reno Silver Sox

Playoffs
- League champions: Reno Silver Sox

CALL seasons
- ← 1974 1976 →

The 1975 California League was a Class A baseball season played between April 15 and August 31. Eight teams played a 140-game schedule, as the winner of each half of the season qualified for the California League championship round.

The Reno Silver Sox won the California League championship, as they finished with the best record in both halves of the regular season.

== Team changes ==
- The Modesto Reds ended their affiliation with the St. Louis Cardinals and began a new affiliation with the Oakland Athletics. The club was renamed to the Modesto A's.
- The Reno Silver Sox ended their affiliation with the Cleveland Indians and began a new shared affiliation with the Minnesota Twins and San Diego Padres.
- The San Jose Bees ended their affiliation with the Kansas City Royals and began a new affiliation with the Cleveland Indians.

== Teams ==
1975 California League
Team	City	MLB Affiliate	Stadium
Bakersfield Dodgers	Bakersfield, California	Los Angeles Dodgers	Sam Lynn Ballpark
Fresno Giants	Fresno, California	San Francisco Giants	John Euless Park
Lodi Orioles	Lodi, California	Baltimore Orioles	Lawrence Park
Modesto A's	Modesto, California	Oakland Athletics	Del Webb Field
Reno Silver Sox	Reno, Nevada	Minnesota Twins; San Diego Padres	Moana Stadium
Salinas Packers	Salinas, California	California Angels	Salinas Municipal Stadium
San Jose Bees	San Jose, California	Cleveland Indians	San Jose Municipal Stadium
Visalia Mets	Visalia, California	New York Mets	Recreation Park

== Map of teams ==
California League Teams

== Regular season ==
=== Summary ===
- The Reno Silver Sox finished with the best record in the league for the first time since 1961.

=== Standings ===
California League
Team	Win	Loss	%	GB
Reno Silver Sox	86	54	.614	–
Fresno Giants	74	66	.529	12
Lodi Orioles	71	69	.507	15
Modesto A's	68	72	.486	18
Salinas Packers	67	73	.479	19
San Jose Bees	67	73	.479	19
Visalia Mets	67	73	.479	19
Bakersfield Dodgers	60	80	.429	24

== League Leaders ==
=== Batting leaders ===
Stat	Player	Total
AVG	Gene Richards, Reno Silver Sox	.381
H	Gene Richards, Reno Silver Sox	191
R	Gene Richards, Reno Silver Sox	148
2B	Matt Keough, Modesto A's	34
3B	Vassie Gardner, San Jose Bees	13
HR	Claude Westmoreland, Bakersfield Dodgers	20
RBI	Butch Wynegar, Reno Silver Sox	112
SB	Gene Richards, Reno Silver Sox	85

=== Pitching leaders ===
Stat	Player	Total
W	Jerry Garvin, Reno Silver Sox; Ed Plank, Fresno Giants	17
ERA	Ed Plank, Fresno Giants	2.26
CG	Jerry Garvin, Reno Silver Sox	17
SHO	Jerry Garvin, Reno Silver Sox; Chuck Gibbon, Salinas Packers; George Milke, Visalia Mets; James Oldham, Modesto A's; Ed Plank, Fresno Giants	3
SV	Paul Ausman, Reno Silver Sox	12
IP	Jerry Garvin, Reno Silver Sox	201.0
SO	Jerry Garvin, Reno Silver Sox	129

== Playoffs ==
- There were no playoffs held, as the Reno Silver Sox won both halves of the regular season.
- The Reno Silver Sox won their third California League championship.

=== Playoff bracket ===
Finals
1	Reno

== Awards ==
California League awards
Award name	Recipient
Most Valuable Player	Gene Richards, Reno Silver Sox

== See also ==
- 1975 Major League Baseball season
