= 1957 California League season =

- League: California League
- Sport: Baseball
- Duration: April 23 – September 8
- Games: 140
- Teams: 8

Regular season
- League champions: Visalia Redlegs
- Season MVP: Vada Pinson, Visalia Redlegs

Playoffs
- League champions: Salinas Packers
- Runners-up: Reno Silver Sox

CALL seasons
- ← 1956 1958 →

The 1957 California League was a Class C baseball season played between April 23 and September 8. Eight teams played a 140-game schedule, as the top four teams qualified for the playoffs.

The Salinas Packers won the California League championship, defeating the Reno Silver Sox in the final round of the playoffs.

== Team changes ==
- The Bakersfield Boosters ended their affiliation with the Philadelphia Phillies and began a new affiliation with the Chicago Cubs. The club was renamed to the Bakersfield Bears.
- The Fresno Cardinals ended their affiliation with the St. Louis Cardinals. The club was renamed to the Fresno Sun Sox.
- The San Jose JoSox began an affiliation with the Pittsburgh Pirates.
- The Visalia Cubs ended their affiliation with the Chicago Cubs and began a new affiliation with the Cincinnati Redlegs. The club was renamed to the Visalia Redlegs.

== Teams ==
1957 California League
Team	City	MLB Affiliate	Stadium
Bakersfield Bears	Bakersfield, California	Chicago Cubs	Sam Lynn Ballpark
Fresno Sun Sox	Fresno, California	None	John Euless Park
Modesto Reds	Modesto, California	New York Yankees	Del Webb Field
Reno Silver Sox	Reno, Nevada	Brooklyn Dodgers	Moana Stadium
Salinas Packers	Salinas, California	Milwaukee Braves	Salinas Municipal Stadium
San Jose JoSox	San Jose, California	Pittsburgh Pirates	San Jose Municipal Stadium
Stockton Ports	Stockton, California	None	Billy Hebert Field
Visalia Redlegs	Visalia, California	Cincinnati Redlegs	Recreation Ballpark

== Map of teams ==
California League Teams

== Regular season ==
=== Summary ===
- The Visalia Redlegs finished with the best record in the regular season for the first time in team history.

=== Standings ===
California League
Team	Win	Loss	%	GB
Visalia Redlegs	84	51	.622	–
Reno Silver Sox	79	59	.572	6.5
Modesto Reds	75	65	.536	11.5
Salinas Packers	68	67	.504	16
San Jose JoSox	67	68	.496	17
Bakersfield Bears	64	75	.460	22
Stockton Ports	61	79	.436	25.5
Fresno Sun Sox	52	86	.377	33.5

== League Leaders ==
=== Batting leaders ===
Stat	Player	Total
AVG	Fran Boniar, Reno Silver Sox	.436
H	Vada Pinson, Visalia Redlegs	209
R	Vada Pinson, Visalia Redlegs	165
2B	Vada Pinson, Visalia Redlegs	40
3B	Vada Pinson, Visalia Redlegs	20
HR	Dick Wilson, Bakersfield Bears	27
RBI	Fran Boniar, Reno Silver Sox	138
SB	Thomas Humber, Reno Silver Sox	75

=== Pitching leaders ===
Stat	Player	Total
W	Pete Hernandez, Visalia Redlegs	25
ERA	William Dial, San Jose JoSox	2.12
CG	Pete Hernandez, Visalia Redlegs	27
SHO	William Dial, San Jose JoSox	6
IP	Pete Hernandez, Visalia Redlegs	264.0
SO	Charlie Drummond, Stockton Ports	251

== Playoffs ==
- The semi-finals were changed to 1 vs. 2 and 3 vs. 4.
- The Salinas Packers won their first California League championship, defeating the Reno Silver Sox in four games.

=== Playoff bracket ===
Semi-finals
1	Visalia	0
2	Reno	2
3	Modesto	1
4	Salinas	2

Finals
2	Reno	1
4	Salinas	3

== Awards ==
California League awards
Award name	Recipient
Most Valuable Player	Vada Pinson, Visalia Redlegs

== See also ==
- 1957 Major League Baseball season
