= 1956 California League season =

- League: California League
- Sport: Baseball
- Duration: April 20 – September 3
- Games: 140
- Teams: 8

Regular season
- League champions: Fresno Cardinals
- Season MVP: Dick Whitman, San Jose JoSox

Playoffs
- League champions: Fresno Cardinals
- Runners-up: Stockton Ports

CALL seasons
- ← 1955 1957 →

The 1956 California League was a Class C baseball season played between April 20 and September 3. Eight teams played a 140-game schedule, as the top four teams qualified for the playoffs.

The Fresno Cardinals won the California League championship, defeating the Stockton Ports in the final round of the playoffs.

== Team changes ==
- The Bakersfield Indians ended their affiliation with the Brooklyn Dodgers and began a new affiliation with the Philadelphia Phillies. The club would be renamed to the Bakersfield Boosters.
- The Reno Silver Sox began an affiliation with the Brooklyn Dodgers.
- The Salinas Packers ended their affiliation with the Pittsburgh Pirates and began a new affiliation with the Milwaukee Braves.
- The San Jose Red Sox ended their affiliation with the Boston Red Sox. The club would be renamed to the San Jose JoSox.

== Teams ==
1956 California League
Team	City	MLB Affiliate	Stadium
Bakersfield Boosters	Bakersfield, California	Philadelphia Phillies	Sam Lynn Ballpark
Fresno Cardinals	Fresno, California	St. Louis Cardinals	Fresno State College Park
Modesto Reds	Modesto, California	New York Yankees	Del Webb Field
Reno Silver Sox	Reno, Nevada	Brooklyn Dodgers	Moana Stadium
Salinas Packers	Salinas, California	Milwaukee Braves	Salinas Municipal Stadium
San Jose JoSox	San Jose, California	None	San Jose Municipal Stadium
Stockton Ports	Stockton, California	None	Billy Hebert Field
Visalia Cubs	Visalia, California	None	Recreation Ballpark

== Map of teams ==
California League Teams

== Regular season ==
=== Summary ===
- The Fresno Cardinals finished with the best record in the regular season for the second consecutive season.

=== Standings ===
California League
Team	Win	Loss	%	GB
Fresno Cardinals	91	49	.650	–
Stockton Ports	83	57	.593	8
San Jose JoSox	79	61	.564	12
Reno Silver Sox	73	67	.521	18
Visalia Cubs	67	73	.479	24
Modesto Reds	66	74	.471	25
Salinas Packers	53	87	.379	38
Bakersfield Boosters	48	92	.343	43

== League Leaders ==
=== Batting leaders ===
Stat	Player	Total
AVG	Dick Whitman, San Jose JoSox	.391
H	Dick Greco, Modesto Reds	192
R	Bud Heslet, Visalia Cubs	147
2B	Dick Greco, Modesto Reds	39
3B	Tony Alomar, Fresno Cardinals	20
HR	Bud Heslet, Visalia Cubs	51
RBI	Bud Heslet, Visalia Cubs	172
SB	Henry Mitchell, Modesto Reds	34

=== Pitching leaders ===
Stat	Player	Total
W	Pete Hernandez, Visalia Cubs	24
ERA	Alvin Spearman, Stockton Ports	2.62
CG	Pete Hernandez, Visalia Cubs	29
SHO	Elmer Franklin, Visalia Cubs; Louis Hribar, Reno Silver Sox	9
IP	Pete Hernandez, Visalia Cubs	287.0
SO	Dave Jordan, Stockton Ports	227

== Playoffs ==
- The playoffs were expanded to two rounds, the league semi-finals and the final series.
- The semi-finals would be 1 vs. 3 and 2 vs. 4.
- The semi-finals were a best-of-three series and the finals would remain a best-of-five series.
- The Fresno Cardinals won their second consecutive, and third overall, California League championship, defeating the Stockton Ports in four games.

=== Playoff bracket ===
Semi-finals
1	Fresno	2
3	San Jose	0
2	Stockton	2
4	Reno	1

Finals
1	Fresno	3
2	Stockton	1

== Awards ==
California League awards
Award name	Recipient
Most Valuable Player	Dick Whitman, San Jose JoSox

== See also ==
- 1956 Major League Baseball season
