= 1976 California League season =

- League: California League
- Sport: Baseball
- Duration: April 13 – August 29
- Games: 140
- Teams: 6

Regular season
- League champions: Salinas Angels
- Season MVP: Thad Bosley, Salinas Angels

Playoffs
- League champions: Reno Silver Sox
- Runners-up: Salinas Angels

CALL seasons
- ← 1975 1977 →

The 1976 California League was a Class A baseball season played between April 13 and August 29. Six teams played a 140-game schedule, as the winner of each half of the season qualified for the California League championship round.

The Reno Silver Sox won the California League championship, as they defeated the Salinas Angels in the final round of the playoffs.

== Team changes ==
- The Bakersfield Dodgers took a leave of absence from the league.
- The Visalia Mets took a leave of absence from the league.
- The Lodi Orioles ended their affiliation with the Baltimore Orioles and began a new affiliation with the Los Angeles Dodgers. The club was renamed to the Lodi Dodgers.
- The Salinas Packers are renamed to the Salinas Angels. The club remained affiliated with the California Angels.

== Teams ==
1976 California League
Team	City	MLB Affiliate	Stadium
Fresno Giants	Fresno, California	San Francisco Giants	John Euless Park
Lodi Dodgers	Lodi, California	Los Angeles Dodgers	Lawrence Park
Modesto A's	Modesto, California	Oakland Athletics	Del Webb Field
Reno Silver Sox	Reno, Nevada	Minnesota Twins; San Diego Padres	Moana Stadium
Salinas Angels	Salinas, California	California Angels	Salinas Municipal Stadium
San Jose Bees	San Jose, California	Cleveland Indians	San Jose Municipal Stadium

== Map of teams ==
California League Teams

== Regular season ==
=== Summary ===
- The Salinas Angels finished with the best record in the league for the first time in team history.

=== Standings ===
California League
Team	Win	Loss	%	GB
Salinas Angels	91	49	.650	–
Fresno Giants	77	63	.550	14
Reno Silver Sox	75	62	.547	14.5
Modesto A's	65	72	.474	24.5
Lodi Dodgers	64	76	.457	27
San Jose Bees	45	95	.321	46

== League Leaders ==
=== Batting leaders ===
Stat	Player	Total
AVG	Daniel Argee, Modesto A's	.356
H	Doc Estes, Reno Silver Sox	184
R	Hosken Powell, Reno Silver Sox	118
2B	Daniel Argee, Modesto A's	35
3B	Doc Estes, Reno Silver Sox	13
HR	Dan Graham, Reno Silver Sox	29
RBI	Dan Graham, Reno Silver Sox	115
SB	Thad Bosley, Salinas Angels	90

=== Pitching leaders ===
Stat	Player	Total
W	Kenny Califano, Salinas Angels	15
ERA	Greg Heydeman, Lodi Dodgers	3.46
CG	Greg Heydeman, Lodi Dodgers; Doug Schaefer, Fresno Giants; Alan Wirth, Fresno Giants	12
SHO	Bruce MacPherson, Reno Silver Sox	3
SV	Gus Quiros, Modesto A's	18
IP	Greg Heydeman, Lodi Dodgers	195.0
SO	Greg Heydeman, Lodi Dodgers	159

== Playoffs ==
- The Reno Silver Sox won their second consecutive, and fourth overall, California League championship, as they defeated the Salinas Angels in four games.

=== Playoff bracket ===
Finals
1	Salinas	1
2	Reno	3

== Awards ==
California League awards
Award name	Recipient
Most Valuable Player	Thad Bosley, Salinas Angels

== See also ==
- 1976 Major League Baseball season
