= 1959 California League season =

- League: California League
- Sport: Baseball
- Duration: April 21 – September 7
- Number of games: 140
- Number of teams: 6

Regular season
- League champions: Modesto Reds
- Season MVP: Willie Davis, Reno Silver Sox

Playoffs
- League champions: Modesto Reds
- Runners-up: Bakersfield Bears

CALL seasons
- ← 1958 1960 →

The 1959 California League was a Class C baseball season played between April 21 and September 7. Six teams played a 140-game schedule, as the winner of each half of the season qualified for the California League championship round.

The Modesto Reds won the California League championship, defeating the Bakersfield Bears in the final round of the playoffs.

== Team changes ==
- The Las Vegas Wranglers fold.
- The Salinas Packers fold.
- The Stockton Ports ended their affiliation with the St. Louis Cardinals and began a new affiliation with the Baltimore Orioles.

== Teams ==
1959 California League
| Team | City | MLB Affiliate | Stadium |
| Bakersfield Bears | Bakersfield, California | Philadelphia Phillies | Sam Lynn Ballpark |
| Fresno Giants | Fresno, California | San Francisco Giants | John Euless Park |
| Modesto Reds | Modesto, California | New York Yankees | Del Webb Field |
| Reno Silver Sox | Reno, Nevada | Los Angeles Dodgers | Moana Stadium |
| Stockton Ports | Stockton, California | Baltimore Orioles | Billy Hebert Field |
| Visalia Redlegs | Visalia, California | Cincinnati Reds | Recreation Ballpark |

== Map of teams ==
California League Teams

== Regular season ==
=== Summary ===
- The Modesto Reds finished with the best record in the regular season for the first time in team history.

=== Standings ===
California League
| Team | Win | Loss | % | GB |
|---|---|---|---|---|
| Modesto Reds | 86 | 55 | .610 | – |
| Reno Silver Sox | 81 | 58 | .583 | 4 |
| Stockton Ports | 76 | 63 | .547 | 9 |
| Bakersfield Bears | 70 | 71 | .496 | 16 |
| Visalia Redlegs | 63 | 77 | .450 | 22.5 |
| Fresno Giants | 44 | 96 | .314 | 41.5 |

== League Leaders ==
=== Batting leaders ===
| Stat | Player | Total |
|---|---|---|
| AVG | Pedro González, Modesto Reds | .371 |
| H | Willie Davis, Reno Silver Sox | 187 |
| R | Willie Davis, Reno Silver Sox | 135 |
| 2B | Willie Davis, Reno Silver Sox | 40 |
| 3B | Willie Davis, Reno Silver Sox | 16 |
| HR | Rich Barry, Modesto Reds | 37 |
| RBI | Ronald Wiley, Bakersfield Bears | 125 |
| SB | Chico Ruiz, Visalia Redlegs | 61 |

=== Pitching leaders ===
| Stat | Player | Total |
|---|---|---|
| W | Hal Reniff, Modesto Reds | 21 |
| ERA | George Gaffney, Stockton Ports | 2.49 |
| CG | Richard Gray, Modesto Reds; Robert Hurvitz, Reno Silver Sox; Hal Reniff, Modesto Reds | 12 |
| SHO | Dennis Bennett, Bakersfield Bears; James Farland, Bakersfield Bears; George Gaffney, Stockton Ports | 3 |
| IP | Richard Gray, Modesto Reds | 215.0 |
| SO | Paul Underwood, Visalia Redlegs | 193 |

== Playoffs ==
- The playoffs were shortened to only the final round.
- The championship series was lengthened to a best-of-seven series.
- The winners of each half of the season qualified for the post-season.
- The Modesto Reds won their third California League championship, defeating the Bakersfield Bears in six games.

=== Playoff bracket ===
| Finals |
| 1 | Bakersfield | 2 |
| 2 | Modesto | 4 |

== Awards ==
California League awards
| Award name | Recipient |
|---|---|
| Most Valuable Player | Willie Davis, Reno Silver Sox |

== See also ==
- 1959 Major League Baseball season
