= 1962 California League season =

- League: California League
- Sport: Baseball
- Duration: April 24 – September 9
- Games: 140
- Teams: 8

Regular season
- League champions: San Jose Bees
- Season MVP: William Haas, Reno Silver Sox

Playoffs
- League champions: San Jose Bees
- Runners-up: Reno Silver Sox

CALL seasons
- ← 1961 1963 →

The 1962 California League was a Class C baseball season played between April 24 and September 9. Eight teams played a 140-game schedule, as the winner of each half of the season qualified for the California League championship round.

The San Jose Bees won the California League championship, as they defeated the Reno Silver Sox in the final round of the playoffs.

== Team changes ==
- The San Jose Bees join the league as an expansion team and begin an affiliation with the Los Angeles Angels.
- The Santa Barbara Rancheros join the league as an expansion team and begin an affiliation with the New York Mets.
- The Modesto Reds ended their affiliation with the New York Yankees and began a new affiliation with the Houston Colt .45s. The club was renamed to the Modesto Colts.
- The Visalia A's ended their affiliation with the Kansas City Athletics and began a new affiliation with the Chicago White Sox. The club was renamed to the Visalia White Sox.

== Teams ==
1962 California League
Team	City	MLB Affiliate	Stadium
Bakersfield Bears	Bakersfield, California	Philadelphia Phillies	Sam Lynn Ballpark
Fresno Giants	Fresno, California	San Francisco Giants	John Euless Park
Modesto Colts	Modesto, California	Houston Colt .45s	Del Webb Field
Reno Silver Sox	Reno, Nevada	Los Angeles Dodgers	Moana Stadium
San Jose Bees	San Jose, California	Los Angeles Angels	San Jose Municipal Stadium
Santa Barbara Rancheros	Santa Barbara, California	New York Mets	Laguna Ball Park
Stockton Ports	Stockton, California	Baltimore Orioles	Billy Hebert Field
Visalia White Sox	Visalia, California	Chicago White Sox	Recreation Ballpark

== Map of teams ==
California League Teams

== Regular season ==
=== Summary ===
- The San Jose Bees finished with the best record in the regular season for the first time in team history.

=== Standings ===
California League
Team	Win	Loss	%	GB
San Jose Bees	78	58	.574	–
Modesto Colts	75	65	.536	5
Reno Silver Sox	70	68	.507	9
Stockton Ports	70	68	.507	9
Santa Barbara Rancheros	68	72	.486	12
Bakersfield Bears	67	72	.482	12.5
Fresno Giants	67	72	.482	12.5
Visalia White Sox	60	80	.429	20

== League Leaders ==
=== Batting leaders ===
Stat	Player	Total
AVG	William Haas, Reno Silver Sox	.368
H	William Haas, Reno Silver Sox	204
R	Larry Ramsey, Reno Silver Sox	141
2B	Grimm Mason, Santa Barbara Rancheros	34
3B	Davey Johnson, Stockton Ports; Grimm Mason, Santa Barbara Rancheros	12
HR	Larry Daniels, Bakersfield Bears	44
RBI	William Haas, Reno Silver Sox	144
SB	Grimm Mason, Santa Barbara Rancheros	44

=== Pitching leaders ===
Stat	Player	Total
W	Fred Newman, San Jose Bees; Peter Urrizola, Bakersfield Bears	15
ERA	Fred Newman, San Jose Bees	1.58
CG	Jose Lizondro, Visalia White Sox	14
SHO	Fred Newman, San Jose Bees	4
IP	Peter Urrizola, Bakersfield Bears	226.0
SO	Norman Koch, Reno Silver Sox	244

== Playoffs ==
- The San Jose Bees won their first California League championship, defeating the Reno Silver Sox in seven games.

=== Playoff bracket ===
Finals
1	San Jose	4
2	Reno	3

== Awards ==
California League awards
Award name	Recipient
Most Valuable Player	William Haas, Reno Silver Sox

== See also ==
- 1962 Major League Baseball season
