= 1963 California League season =

- League: California League
- Sport: Baseball
- Duration: April 23 – September 8
- Games: 140
- Teams: 8

Regular season
- League champions: Stockton Ports
- Season MVP: José Vidal, Reno Silver Sox

Playoffs
- League champions: Stockton Ports
- Runners-up: Modesto Colts

CALL seasons
- ← 1962 1964 →

The 1963 California League was a Class A baseball season played between April 23 and September 8. Eight teams played a 140-game schedule, as the winner of each half of the season qualified for the California League championship round.

The Stockton Ports won the California League championship, as they defeated the Modesto Colts in the final round of the playoffs.

== League changes ==
A significant reorganization of the minor leagues took place in 1963, caused by the contraction of clubs and leagues during the 1950s and early 1960s. In 1949, the peak of the postwar minor league baseball boom, 448 teams in 59 leagues were members of the National Association of Professional Baseball Leagues, with the number of teams falling to 324 in 1952, and 243 in 1955. By the end of 1963, only 15 leagues above Rookie-level survived in the United States and Canada.

As part of the reorganization of the minor leagues, the California League was designated as from a Class C league to a Class A league.

== Team changes ==
- The Visalia White Sox ended their affiliation with the Chicago White Sox and were relocated to Salinas, California. The club would be renamed to the Salinas Mets and begin an affiliation with the New York Mets.
- The Reno Silver Sox ended their affiliation with the Los Angeles Dodgers and began a new affiliation with the Pittsburgh Pirates.
- The Santa Barbara Rancheros ended their affiliation with the New York Mets and began a new affiliation with the Los Angeles Dodgers.

== Teams ==
1963 California League
Team	City	MLB Affiliate	Stadium
Bakersfield Bears	Bakersfield, California	Philadelphia Phillies	Sam Lynn Ballpark
Fresno Giants	Fresno, California	San Francisco Giants	John Euless Park
Modesto Colts	Modesto, California	Houston Colt .45s	Del Webb Field
Reno Silver Sox	Reno, Nevada	Pittsburgh Pirates	Moana Stadium
Salinas Mets	Salinas, California	New York Mets	Salinas Municipal Stadium
San Jose Bees	San Jose, California	Los Angeles Angels	San Jose Municipal Stadium
Santa Barbara Rancheros	Santa Barbara, California	Los Angeles Dodgers	Laguna Ball Park
Stockton Ports	Stockton, California	Baltimore Orioles	Billy Hebert Field

== Map of teams ==
California League Teams

== Regular season ==
=== Summary ===
- The Stockton Ports finished with the best record in the regular season for the first time since 1947.

=== Standings ===
California League
Team	Win	Loss	%	GB
Stockton Ports	87	52	.626	–
Bakersfield Bears	78	62	.557	9.5
Fresno Giants	73	67	.521	14.5
Modesto Colts	72	68	.507	15.5
Reno Silver Sox	71	69	.507	16.5
Santa Barbara Rancheros	67	72	.482	20
San Jose Bees	62	78	.443	25.5
Salinas Mets	49	91	.350	20

== League Leaders ==
=== Batting leaders ===
Stat	Player	Total
AVG	José Vidal, Reno Silver Sox	.340
H	Damaso Blanco, Fresno Giants	187
R	Damaso Blanco, Fresno Giants	127
2B	Don Bridges, Bakersfield Bears	38
3B	Richard Yencha, Stockton Ports	15
HR	José Vidal, Reno Silver Sox	40
RBI	José Vidal, Reno Silver Sox	162
SB	Sonny Jackson, Modesto Colts	61

=== Pitching leaders ===
Stat	Player	Total
W	Bob Olson, Stockton Ports	19
ERA	John Hogg, Stockton Ports	2.21
CG	Bob Olson, Stockton Ports	17
SHO	Danny Coombs, Modesto Colts; Francisco Rivas, Fresno Giants; Dick Selma, Salinas Mets	3
IP	Bob Olson, Stockton Ports	218.0
SO	Dick Selma, Salinas Mets	221

== Playoffs ==
- The final round was shortened from a best-of-seven series to a best-of-three series.
- The Stockton Ports won their third California League championship, defeating the Modesto Colts in two games.

=== Playoff bracket ===
Finals
1	Modesto	0
2	Stockton	2

== Awards ==
California League awards
Award name	Recipient
Most Valuable Player	José Vidal, Reno Silver Sox

== See also ==
- 1963 Major League Baseball season
