= 1960 California League season =

- League: California League
- Sport: Baseball
- Duration: April 19 – September 11
- Games: 140
- Teams: 6

Regular season
- League champions: Reno Silver Sox
- Season MVP: Robert Arrighi, Reno Silver Sox

Playoffs
- League champions: Reno Silver Sox

CALL seasons
- ← 1959 1961 →

The 1960 California League was a Class C baseball season played between April 19 and September 11. Six teams played a 140-game schedule, as the winner of each half of the season qualified for the California League championship round.

The Reno Silver Sox won the California League championship, as they won both halves of the season.

== Team changes ==
- The Visalia Redlegs ended their affiliation with the Cincinnati Reds and began a new affiliation with the Kansas City Athletics. The club was renamed to the Visalia A's.

== Teams ==
1960 California League
Team	City	MLB Affiliate	Stadium
Bakersfield Bears	Bakersfield, California	Philadelphia Phillies	Sam Lynn Ballpark
Fresno Giants	Fresno, California	San Francisco Giants	John Euless Park
Modesto Reds	Modesto, California	New York Yankees	Del Webb Field
Reno Silver Sox	Reno, Nevada	Los Angeles Dodgers	Moana Stadium
Stockton Ports	Stockton, California	Baltimore Orioles	Billy Hebert Field
Visalia A's	Visalia, California	Kansas City Athletics	Recreation Ballpark

== Map of teams ==
California League Teams

== Regular season ==
=== Summary ===
- The Reno Silver Sox finished with the best record in the regular season for the first time in team history.

=== Standings ===
California League
Team	Win	Loss	%	GB
Reno Silver Sox	89	51	.636	–
Fresno Giants	75	65	.536	14
Bakersfield Bears	74	66	.529	15
Stockton Ports	66	74	.471	23
Modesto Reds	61	78	.439	27.5
Visalia A's	54	85	.388	34.5

== League Leaders ==
=== Batting leaders ===
Stat	Player	Total
AVG	Chuck Hinton, Stockton Ports	.369
H	Al Ferrara, Reno Silver Sox	177
R	Lowell Barnhart, Reno Silver Sox; Al Ferrara, Reno Silver Sox	116
2B	Agustin Enriquez, Visalia A's	37
3B	Clyde Hampton, Bakersfield Bears	14
HR	Dick Edwards, Bakersfield Bears	22
RBI	Lowell Barnhart, Reno Silver Sox	109
SB	Luis Caputo, Fresno Giants	50

=== Pitching leaders ===
Stat	Player	Total
W	Thad Tillotson, Reno Silver Sox	19
ERA	John Hogg, Bakersfield Bears	2.59
CG	Gary Kroll, Bakersfield Bears; Danilo Rivas, Fresno Giants	17
SHO	Gary Kroll, Bakersfield Bears	4
IP	Gary Kroll, Bakersfield Bears	257.0
SO	Gary Kroll, Bakersfield Bears	309

== Playoffs ==
- There were no playoffs held, as the Reno Silver Sox won both halves of the regular season.
- The Reno Silver Sox won their first California League championship.

== Awards ==
California League awards
Award name	Recipient
Most Valuable Player	Robert Arrighi, Reno Silver Sox

== See also ==
- 1960 Major League Baseball season
