= 1961 California League season =

- League: California League
- Sport: Baseball
- Duration: April 25 – September 4
- Games: 140
- Teams: 6

Regular season
- League champions: Reno Silver Sox
- Season MVP: Don Williams, Reno Silver Sox

Playoffs
- League champions: Reno Silver Sox

CALL seasons
- ← 1960 1962 →

The 1961 California League was a Class C baseball season played between April 25 and September 4. Six teams played a 140-game schedule, as the winner of each half of the season qualified for the California League championship round.

The Reno Silver Sox won the California League championship, as they won both halves of the season.

== Teams ==
1961 California League
Team	City	MLB Affiliate	Stadium
Bakersfield Bears	Bakersfield, California	Philadelphia Phillies	Sam Lynn Ballpark
Fresno Giants	Fresno, California	San Francisco Giants	John Euless Park
Modesto Reds	Modesto, California	New York Yankees	Del Webb Field
Reno Silver Sox	Reno, Nevada	Los Angeles Dodgers	Moana Stadium
Stockton Ports	Stockton, California	Baltimore Orioles	Billy Hebert Field
Visalia A's	Visalia, California	Kansas City Athletics	Recreation Ballpark

== Map of teams ==
California League Teams

== Regular season ==
=== Summary ===
- The Reno Silver Sox finished with the best record in the regular season for the second consecutive season.

=== Standings ===
California League
Team	Win	Loss	%	GB
Reno Silver Sox	97	43	.693	–
Bakersfield Bears	82	58	.586	15
Fresno Giants	68	72	.486	29
Visalia A's	60	79	.432	36.5
Modesto Reds	57	82	.410	39.5
Stockton Ports	54	84	.391	42

== League Leaders ==
=== Batting leaders ===
Stat	Player	Total
AVG	Don Williams, Reno Silver Sox	.363
H	Don Williams, Reno Silver Sox	197
R	Don Williams, Reno Silver Sox	132
2B	Lou Ertle, Reno Silver Sox; Dick Nen, Reno Silver Sox	34
3B	Jim Ray Hart, Fresno Giants	14
HR	Dick Nen, Reno Silver Sox	32
RBI	Dick Nen, Reno Silver Sox	144
SB	Billy Sorrell, Bakersfield Bears	43

=== Pitching leaders ===
Stat	Player	Total
W	Bruce Gardner, Reno Silver Sox	20
ERA	Joe Moeller, Reno Silver Sox	1.82
CG	Bruce Gardner, Reno Silver Sox	18
SHO	Joe Moeller, Reno Silver Sox	5
IP	José Santiago, Visalia A's	222.0
SO	José Santiago, Visalia A's	218

== Playoffs ==
- There were no playoffs held, as the Reno Silver Sox won both halves of the regular season.
- The Reno Silver Sox won their second consecutive California League championship.

=== Playoff bracket ===
Finals
1	Reno

== Awards ==
California League awards
Award name	Recipient
Most Valuable Player	Don Williams, Reno Silver Sox

== See also ==
- 1961 Major League Baseball season
