= California League Hall of Fame =

- Established: 2016
- Type: Professional sports hall of fame
- Website: Official website

The California League Hall of Fame is an American baseball hall of fame which honors players, managers, and executives of the California League for their accomplishments and/or contributions to the league in playing, administrative, media, or related roles. The Hall of Fame inducted its first class in 2016. As of 2019, 28 individuals have been inducted into the California League Hall of Fame.

== Table key ==
Year	Indicates the year of induction
Position(s)	Indicates the inductee's primary playing position(s) or association with the league
Team inducted as	Indicates the team for which the inductee has been recognized
†	Indicates a member of the National Baseball Hall of Fame and Museum

== Inductees ==
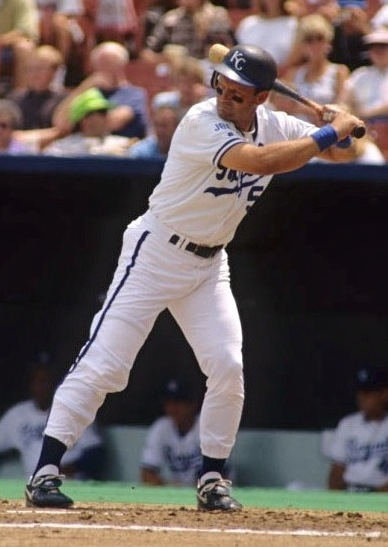
George Brett, third baseman for the San Jose Bees in 1972, was inaugurated in 2016.

Year	Name	Position(s)	Team inducted as
2018	Roberto Alomar^{†}	Second baseman	Reno Padres
2019	Adrián Beltré	Third baseman	San Bernardino Stampede
2016	George Brett^{†}	Third baseman	San Jose Bees
2016	José Cruz Jr.	Outfielder	Lancaster JetHawks
2016	Don Drysdale^{†}	Pitcher	Bakersfield Indians
2017	Dave Duncan	Catcher	Modesto Reds
2016	Darin Erstad	Outfielder	Lake Elsinore Storm
2019	Rollie Fingers^{†}	Pitcher	Modesto Reds
2019	Joe Gagliardi	League president	—
2016	Ken Griffey Jr.^{†}	Outfielder	San Bernardino Spirit
2017	Doug Harvey^{†}	Umpire	California League
2016	Rickey Henderson^{†}	Outfielder	Modesto A's
2019	Harry Heslet	—	Visalia Cubs
2018	Larry Jackson	Pitcher	Fresno Cardinals
2016	Reggie Jackson^{†}	Outfielder	Modesto A's
2017	Tony La Russa^{†}	Second baseman	Modesto Reds
2016	Sam Lynn	Youth baseball philanthropist	Bakersfield
2016	Pedro Martínez^{†}	Pitcher	Bakersfield Dodgers
2018	Joe Morgan^{†}	Second baseman	Modesto Colts
2016	Xavier Nady	First baseman	Lake Elsinore Storm
2017	Mike Piazza^{†}	Catcher	Bakersfield Dodgers
2016	Vada Pinson	Outfielder	Visalia Redlegs
2017	Kirby Puckett^{†}	Outfielder	Visalia Oaks
2018	Lenn Sakata	Manager	Various
2016	Gary Sheffield	Shortstop	Stockton Ports
2016	Bob Talbot	Catcher	Visalia Cubs
2016	Fernando Valenzuela	Pitcher	Lodi Dodgers
2016	Omar Vizquel	Shortstop	Salinas Spurs

== See also ==
- Baseball awards § Single-A Advanced
