= Don Williams (baseball scout) =

American baseball player, manager and scout

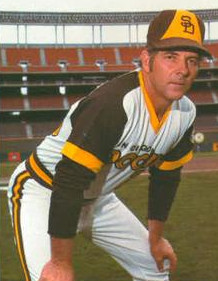
- Williams in 1978
- Coach
- Born: December 24, 1937 (age 88); Paragould, Arkansas, U.S.
- Bats: Right Throws: Right
- Stats at Baseball Reference

Teams
- San Diego Padres (1977–1980)

Donald Ellis Williams (born December 24, 1937) is an American former professional baseball player, manager and scout. A shortstop and second baseman in minor league baseball during his 13-year active career, he threw and batted right-handed, stood 5 feet 9 inches (1.75 m) tall and weighed 185 pounds (84 kg).

A shortstop and second baseman, Williams played in the Brooklyn/Los Angeles Dodgers' farm system from 1956–68, though he missed much of the 1962 season due to service in the military. He won the California League MVP award in 1961 as a member of the Reno Silver Sox. That season, he batted .363, scored 132 runs and collected 197 hits, leading the Class C circuit in all three categories.

He later managed the Bakersfield Dodgers in 1968, was a scout for the San Diego Padres from 1969–74, a minor league instructor for the Padres from 1974–76 and a Major League coach for the Padres from 1977–80, working under managers John McNamara, Alvin Dark, Roger Craig and Jerry Coleman. He later was an area scout for the Atlanta Braves and Tampa Bay Devil Rays, based in Paragould.
