= Jack Maloof =

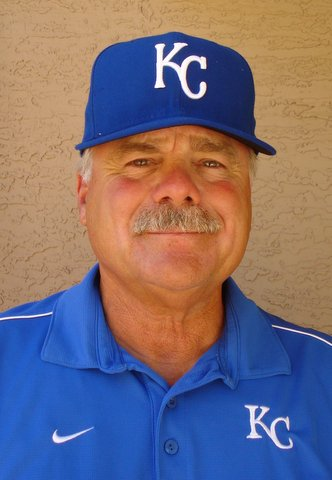
- Maloof in 2012
- First baseman / Hitting coach
- Born: October 12, 1948 (age 77); Redlands, California, U.S.
- Bats: Left Throws: Left
- Stats at Baseball Reference

Jack Maloof (/məˈluːf/ mə-LOOF; born October 12, 1948) is an American former minor league baseball player and hitting coach for the Kansas City Royals of Major League Baseball. Maloof was an eight-year player in the minor leagues with a career batting average of .303, hitting .300 or better five times. In 1979, he played his final season for the Seibu Lions in Japan before becoming a manager in the minors and eventually a hitting coach in the majors. During his playing career, he led his league four times in walks, three times in on-base percentage (OBP), and once in batting average.

In college, Maloof was a two-sport star, as a wide receiver in football and outfielder in baseball. Maloof hit .335 in 1970 to earn NAIA Honorable Mention while setting a La Verne record with 89 hits. In 1971, he batted .367 and was a NAIA District All-American. In 2003, Maloof was inducted into the University of La Verne Athletics Hall of Fame.

Maloof's book Hit Like a Big Leaguer was published by McGraw-Hill in February 2006 with endorsements from Ozzie Guillén, John Kruk and Roberto Alomar, all of whom he had worked with in the San Diego Padres system. Tony Gwynn, another Maloof disciple, wrote the foreword.

== Playing career ==
Maloof was chosen in the 27th round of the 1971 amateur draft by the Minnesota Twins. Assigned to the Auburn Twins, he batted .402/.508/.453, stole 14 bases in 16 tries and scored 57 runs in 68 games. He fielded .986, one point shy of the lead for a New York–Penn League outfielder and also ranked second with 141 putouts, trailing Tony Scott. Maloof easily won the batting title, 57 points over Mike Cubbage and also led in runs, hits and OBP. His 52 walks were five shy of league leader. He was an All-Star selection and his .402 average that year stands to this day.

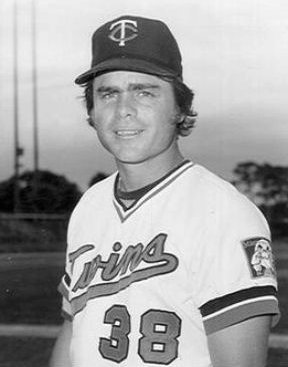
Maloof with the Minnesota Twins organization

Maloof followed up his incredible rookie season hitting .308/.417/.382 for the 1972 Lynchburg Twins. He led the Carolina League in walks (86) and barely missed the league batting crown by .02, trailing only Dave Parker (.310). Maloof was third in the league in runs (82) finishing behind Parker and Ed Ott. He fielded .993 at first base and .979 in the outfield; either would have led the Carolina League players at those positions had he qualified.

In 1973, Maloof was a 1B/OF once more, now with the AA Orlando Twins. He hit .278/.380/.326 and stole 22 bases in 32 tries while drawing 71 walks. The next year, he was back in Orlando and fielded .992 at both outfield (he would have led the league had he qualified) and first base. He produced at a .300/.440/.361 clip, finishing third in the Southern League in average behind only Nyls Nyman and Kim Andrew. In addition to his 3rd place batting average, he led the league in walks and OBP.

In 1975, Maloof was returned to Orlando. Still only 25, he was a moderate prospect. That season, he hit .317/.463/.364 and finished second in the Southern League in batting average behind Charles Heil. He also led the league a second year in a row in both walks (105) and OBP.

Maloof made it to AAA in 1976 but the outlook was bleak – Rod Carew was playing first in Minnesota and Maloof had to split time at first for the Tacoma Twins with Randy Bass, a top slugging prospect. Maloof hit a respectable .281/.435/.355 as a 1B/DH with 94 runs, 15 steals and 116 walks to just 51 strikeouts. He led the Pacific Coast League in walks and was among the leaders in OBP.

Maloof was traded to the Cincinnati Reds for Art DeFilippis on March 28, 1977.

In 1978, Maloof moved to the San Diego Padres organization with the Hawaii Islanders and batted .310/.434/.405. He scored 93 runs, stole 25 bases in 30 tries and drew 104 walks.

In his final playing year, Maloof went to Japan in 1979, joining Tony Muser as the new American hitters for the Seibu Lions. Maloof hit a solid .290/.358/.414, surprisingly only drawing 52 walks while hitting 12 HR's. He led the Pacific League with 503 at-bats.

== Coaching career ==
Immediately following his playing career, Maloof turned his attention to managing and was a skipper in the San Diego Padres organization for six seasons with the "A" Reno Silver Sox (1980–1981), "A" Reno Padres (1982), "AA" Beaumont Golden Gators (1983), and "A" Spokane Indians (1984–1985). His managing highlights include reaching the "A" California League play-offs in 1981 and winning the "AA" Texas League Championship in 1983 with a team that featured John Kruk and Ozzie Guillén.

In 1985, Maloof turned his attention away from managing so he could concentrate exclusively on hitting development. That year, the Padres named Maloof their Minor League Hitting Instructor, a position he held until 1990.

In 1990, Maloof was named the Major League Hitting Coach for the San Diego Padres.

In 1992, Maloof was one of the first hires of the expansion Florida Marlins when he was named the Minor League Hitting Coordinator and developed a hitting philosophy that ensured continuity throughout the organization. For his efforts, he was named the inaugural recipient of the Marlin's Carl Barger Award for Excellence in Player Development in 1992.

After 7 years as the Marlins Minor League Hitting Instructor, he was promoted to Major League Hitting Coach for the Florida Marlins for 3 seasons (1999 through 2001). During those three year, the Marlins set 18 franchise records including hits, home runs, doubles, triples, total bases, slugging percentage, sacrifice flies, and RBIs. In 2001, the club led the National League in doubles with 324; finished 6th in NL for Batting average (.264); six players achieved career highs for RBIs; and six Marlins finished with 18 or more home runs.

In 2002, Maloof returned to the minor leagues when he was hired by the Atlanta Braves and assigned as the Hitting Coach for the Myrtle Beach Pelicans from 2002–2004.

From 2005–2007, the Braves named Maloof their Minor League Hitting Coordinator.

In 2008, Maloof was hired by the Kansas City Royals where he served 5 years as the organization's Minor League Hitting Coordinator and Special Assistant to Player Development. On Oct. 24, 2012 the Royals promoted Maloof to their major league coaching staff where he will serve as the club's Hitting Coach for the 2013 season. He split duties with assistant hitting coach Andre David. On May 30, 2013, Maloof was optioned to the minors due to a slumping Royals offense.
