= Tom Saffell =

American baseball player (1921–2012)

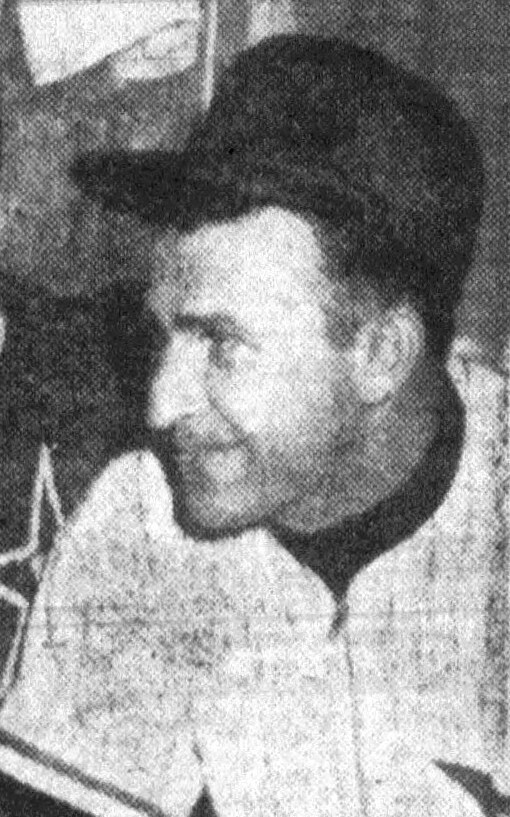
- Saffell in 1952
- Outfielder
- Born: July 26, 1921; Etowah, Tennessee, U.S.
- Died: September 10, 2012 (aged 91); Sarasota, Florida, U.S.
- Batted: Left Threw: Right

MLB debut
- July 2, 1949, for the Pittsburgh Pirates

Last MLB appearance
- September 25, 1955, for the Kansas City Athletics

MLB statistics
- Batting average: .238
- Home runs: 6
- Runs batted in: 40
- Stats at Baseball Reference

Teams
- Pittsburgh Pirates (1949–1951, 1955); Kansas City Athletics (1955)

Thomas Judson Saffell (July 26, 1921 – September 10, 2012) was an American professional baseball outfielder. He played in Major League Baseball (MLB) for the Pittsburgh Pirates and Kansas City Athletics.

== Early life ==
Saffell grew up in Etowah, Tennessee, playing sports, especially fast-pitch softball. His team won the state tournament and played in a national tournament in Detroit. After completing high school in 1940, Saffell enrolled at Maryville College, where he injured his knee playing football. Saffell signed as a baseball player in 1941 with the Newport Canners in the Appalachian League, but reinjured his knee and was released. He tried out with the Kingsport Cherokees, but was cut after two weeks because of a sore knee, playing 23 games in all while hitting .231.

Saffell returned home and worked for a railroad until serving in World War II. He enlisted with the Army Air Corps in late 1942 and joined them in 1943. Saffell flew 61 missions over Europe in a P-47 Thunderbolt, and was discharged in 1946. He received six awards of the Air Medal for his service.

== Career synopsis ==
Saffell played for the Pittsburgh Pirates and Kansas City Athletics in parts of four seasons spanning 1949–1955. He batted left-handed, threw right-handed, and was a fleet baserunner. He wore #18 and #21 for Pittsburgh. Saffell averaged .238 in the major leagues and .286 in 1,576 minor league contests. He spent time with the Indianapolis Indians and Hollywood Stars. He also served as a pitcher for the television series Home Run Derby.

== Major and minor league outfielder ==
In 1946, he batted .270 for Class A Charleston of the South Atlantic League. In a month the parent club, the Atlanta Crackers, sent him to the Burlington Bees of the Class C Carolina League, where he hit .370 with 5 homers, 42 RBIs, and 28 stolen bases. Saffell went to spring training with the Crackers in 1947. After three weeks the club sent him to the Selma Cloverleafs of the Class B Southeastern League. He was passed over by Atlanta, which signed All-American football player, Charley Trippi, and gave him a $10,000 bonus.

Saffell was recalled by the Pirates from the Indianapolis Indians of the American Association on June 26, 1949. He batted .299 for Indianapolis in 1948 and was hitting .278 for them in 68 games in 1949. He played center field, batted leadoff, third, and pinch hit for Pittsburgh, in the second half of 1949 with a .322 average. Saffell was released by Pittsburgh before the end of spring training in 1950. Saffell was again recalled by the Pirates on July 28, 1951, after playing 42 games for Indianapolis with a batting average of .304.

Saffell was purchased by the Athletics from the Pirates for the $10,000 waiver price on September 14, 1955. On April 16, 1956, Saffell was acquired from the Athletics by the Brooklyn Dodgers, along with right-handed pitcher LeRoy Wheat, for rookie catcher Charley Thompson. Saffell was assigned to the Portland Beavers of the Pacific Coast League and never again appeared in the majors, although he played in the Dodgers' farm system until 1959, after which he played in 17 games over the years 1962–64 in the Pirates' system.

== Minor league manager ==
Saffell was replaced by Homer "Dixie" Howell as manager of the Class A Jacksonville Jets of the South Atlantic League, on July 18, 1961. In May 1964 Saffell was suspended for 30 days and fined $250 by Eddie Mulligan, President of the California League. As manager of the Reno Silver Sox, he refused to let his team take the field for a game at the Fresno Giants. Saffell disputed a call by umpire Joe Carrington at home plate on the previous night. When he found out that Carrington was to umpire again, he pulled the Silver Sox off the field following batting and infield practice. He was given five minutes to bring out his lineup card before the game was forfeited.

Saffell served as President of the Gulf Coast League in Sarasota, Florida. In 1999 he was presented with the King of Baseball award given by Minor League Baseball.
