= Salinas Peppers =

- 1995–1997; Salinas, California

Minor league affiliations
- League: Western Baseball League

Team data
- Previous parks: Salinas Municipal Stadium

The Salinas Peppers were an independent baseball team located in Salinas, California. The team played in the independent Western Baseball League, and was not affiliated with any Major League Baseball team. Their home stadium was Salinas Municipal Stadium.

The Peppers were founded in 1995 and played for three seasons.
