= Lou Kahn =

American Baseball player/coach

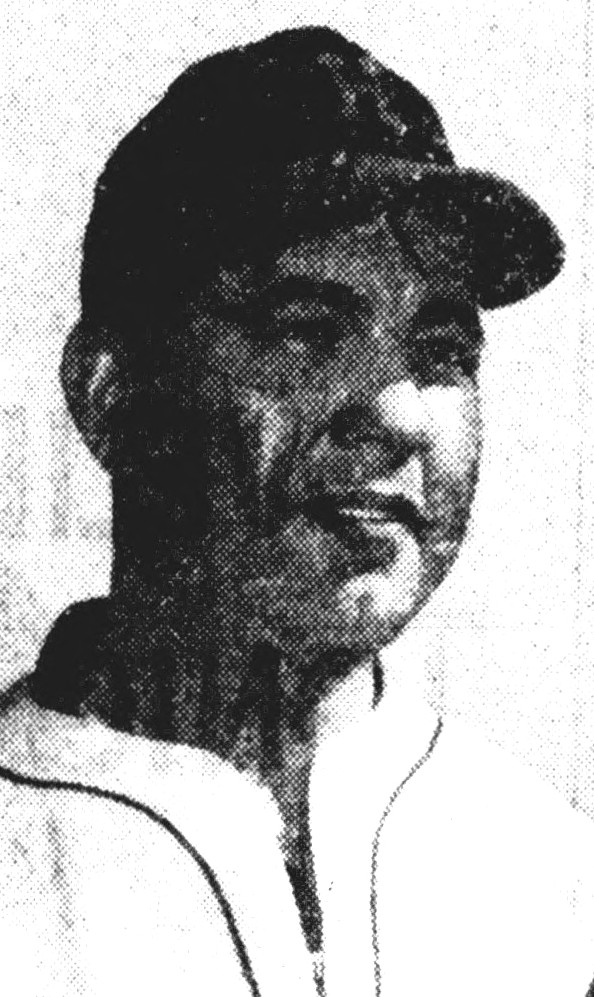
- Kahn with the Hollywood Stars, circa 1948
- Coach
- Born: December 4, 1915; St. Louis, Missouri
- Died: March 13, 2002 (aged 86); Albany, Georgia
- Batted: Right Threw: Right
- Stats at Baseball Reference

Teams
- As coach: St. Louis Cardinals (1954–1955)

Louis Kahn Jr. (December 4, 1915 – March 13, 2002) was an American professional baseball player, manager, scout and coach. Born in St. Louis, Missouri, Kahn was a catcher during his playing days. He threw and batted right-handed, stood 5 feet, 10 inches (1.78 m) tall and weighed 200 pounds (91 kg).

Kahn's playing career extended for 17 seasons (1936–42 and 1944–53), all in minor league baseball. He initially signed with his hometown St. Louis Cardinals, and spent his career in a number of Major League farm systems. Although he batted .304 in 1,507 minor league games, he never rose higher than the top level of the minors.

During the course of his lengthy playing career, Kahn toiled for three seasons under executive Branch Rickey, inventor of the farm system, and Kahn came to be known as a fierce critic of Rickey and the system he created. "He knocked down everyone's salaries, and he put the difference between what they got, and what they should have got, in his own pocket," Kahn once said. "I was just a number to Branch Rickey. He ran baseball factories and screwed his players every way but right side up."

Kahn, however, did have a long career in the game after his catching career ended. After working as a Major League coach for the 1954–55 Cardinals and coaching for the Triple-A Rochester Red Wings and Toronto Maple Leafs of the International League, he joined the Philadelphia Phillies' organization as a scout and minor league manager in 1960, serving into the 1980s.

Kahn settled in Albany, Georgia, where he played minor league baseball in 1937, and was a pecan-buyer during the off-season. He died in Albany at the age of 86.

== See also ==
- List of St. Louis Cardinals coaches
