= Ed Plank =

American baseball player (born 1952)

- Pitcher
- Born: April 9, 1952 (age 74); Chicago, Illinois, U.S.
- Batted: Right Threw: Right

MLB debut
- September 6, 1978, for the San Francisco Giants

Last MLB appearance
- September 22, 1979, for the San Francisco Giants

MLB statistics
- Win–loss record: 0–0
- Earned run average: 5.23
- Strikeouts: 2
- Stats at Baseball Reference

Teams
- San Francisco Giants (1978–1979)

Edward Arthur Plank (born April 9, 1952) is an American former Major League Baseball pitcher. He pitched for the San Francisco Giants in 1978 and 1979.
