= Greg Heydeman =

American baseball player (born 1952)

- Pitcher
- Born: January 2, 1952 (age 74); Carmel, California, U.S.
- Batted: Right Threw: Right

MLB debut
- September 2, 1973, for the Los Angeles Dodgers

Last MLB appearance
- September 2, 1973, for the Los Angeles Dodgers

MLB statistics
- Record: 0-0
- Earned run average: 4.50
- Strikeouts: 1
- Stats at Baseball Reference

Teams
- Los Angeles Dodgers (1973)

Gregory George Heydeman (born January 2, 1952) is an American former pitcher in Major League Baseball.

Greg attended Monterey High School (Monterey, California) and was signed by the Los Angeles Dodgers as an undrafted free agent in 1971. He pitched only two innings for the Los Angeles Dodgers against the Houston Astros on September 2, 1973. He allowed 2 hits, 1 earned run, struck out 1 and walked 1 in his brief major league stint.
