= Neil Wilson (baseball) =

American baseball player (1935-2013)

- Catcher
- Born: June 14, 1935; Lexington, Tennessee, U.S.
- Died: February 20, 2013 (aged 77); Jackson, Tennessee, U.S.
- Batted: Left Threw: Right

MLB debut
- April 17, 1960, for the San Francisco Giants

Last MLB appearance
- April 26, 1960, for the San Francisco Giants

MLB statistics
- Batting average: .000
- At bats: 10
- Walks: 1
- Stats at Baseball Reference

Teams
- San Francisco Giants (1960)

Samuel O'Neil Wilson (June 14, 1935 – February 20, 2013) was an American professional baseball player. He appeared in six games in Major League Baseball for the 1960 San Francisco Giants as a catcher, starting in two games (on April 20 and 22). The native of Lexington, Tennessee, batted left-handed, threw right-handed and was listed at 6 feet 1 inch (1.85 m) tall and 175 pounds (79 kg).

Wilson was signed by the then-New York Giants in 1956. He spent parts of four years in the minor leagues before being on the opening day roster for the 1960 San Francisco Giants. Wilson and came to the plate eleven times, with no hits and one base on balls, before being demoted to the minors on April 26, 1960. He made one error in 23 chances defensively, with one passed ball. Wilson continued to play professional baseball through 1962 but never again appeared in the big leagues.

While playing for the Fresno Giants in 1958, he was named Most Valuable Player of the Class C California League after leading the circuit in hits (191) and batting average (.349).
