= Harry Heslet =

Harry Reuben "Bud" Heslet (February 27, 1920 – April 21, 2012) was a US minor league baseball player from 1940 to 1942 and from 1946 to 1956 who hit 314 home runs and won five home run titles in his 14-year career. He was described as fiery-tempered, slow-footed and often lackluster defensively.

He was born in Topeka, Kansas and attended Seaman High School. He began his professional career in 1940, playing for the Norfolk Yankees and the Joplin Miners and hitting a combined .287 with nine home runs in 104 games. He was named the Western League's All-Star catcher. In 1941, he was with Joplin again and hit .281 with 12 home runs in 119 games. He again played with Joplin in 1942, hitting .343 with 13 home runs in 87 games. He was the Western Association leader in batting average.

He did not play from 1943 to 1945 due to World War II. He returned in 1946 to play for the Twin Falls Cowboys – that season, he hit .308 with 29 home runs in 124 games. He led the Pioneer League in both homers and RBI (124). He was fourth in league Most Valuable Player voting that year. With the Binghamton Triplets in 1947, he hit .288 with 24 home runs. He led the Eastern League in homers, two ahead of Ken Wood. At age 27, he made it to Triple-A as he played for the Newark Bears in 1948 and 1949, hitting .266 with a .349 on-base percentage and a .421 slugging mark with nine home runs and 43 RBI in 91 games in 1948 and .228/.322/.412 with 22 home runs and 75 RBI in 140 games in 1949. He began playing the outfield in addition to catching in 1948 and would mostly be a full-time outfielder by 1950. Heslet tied for 9th in the 1949 International League in homers with Chet Laabs, George Schmees and Coaker Triplett. Every other player in the league with 20 or more home runs would appear in the major leagues during their career.

Heslet played with the Toronto Maple Leafs in 1950 and 1951. In his first year with the team, he hit .256/.354/.471 with 21 home runs and 71 RBI in 135 games. He became the first player in International League history to hit three home runs in a game when he did so that year. Russ Sullivan became the second to do so, in 1955. The following year, he hit .257/.350/.380 with six home runs and 27 RBI in 80 games to end his run in AAA. With the San Antonio Missions in 1952, he hit .283/.370/.491 with 31 home runs in 155 games; he led the Texas League in home runs by eight.

In 1953 and 1954, and for part of 1955, Heslet played for the Shreveport Sports. He hit .269/.350/.551 with 41 home runs and 100 RBI in 150 games in 1953, leading the Texas League in home runs by 11 over Jim Baxes and was second in slugging. In 1954, he hit .263/.368/.503 with 31 home runs and 100 RBI in 150 games. He split the 1955 season between the Sports and the Sacramento Solons, hitting .219 with 15 home runs and 37 RBI in 102 games.

He played his final season in 1956, with the Visalia Cubs. That year, he hit .334 with 51 home runs, 172 RBI and 175 hits in 140 games – all career highs. Both his home run and RBI totals were California League records. Heslet won his last home run title, seven ahead of Dick Greco and also led in both runs and RBI. His .685 slugging percentage tied Greco for second behind Joe Brovia. That campaign was considered "the greatest offensive season in California League history." Despite posting such solid numbers, 1956 would be his final professional season. He retired because, "...I had a boy [Joseph] who was two and a half years old, and I wanted to get him settled...The only way to do that was to give up baseball, stay home and be a dad. So I retired..."

Overall, Heslet hit .279 with 1,164 RBI, 266 doubles, 48 triples and 314 home runs in 1,711 games in his 14-year career. He never reached the major leagues.

He had a card in the 1950 Big League Stars baseball card set.
