= Gene Richards (baseball) =

American baseball player (born 1953)

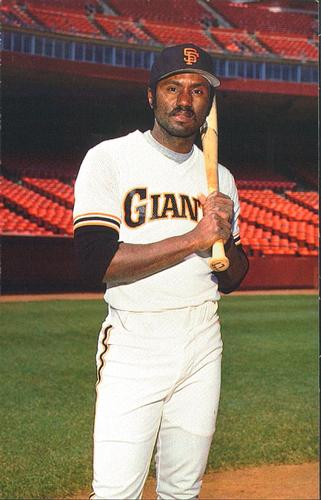
- Richards with the San Francisco Giants in 1984
- Outfielder
- Born: September 29, 1953 (age 73); Monticello, South Carolina, U.S.
- Batted: Left Threw: Left

MLB debut
- April 6, 1977, for the San Diego Padres

Last MLB appearance
- September 30, 1984, for the San Francisco Giants

MLB statistics
- Batting average: .290
- Home runs: 26
- Runs batted in: 255
- Stats at Baseball Reference

Teams
- San Diego Padres (1977–1983); San Francisco Giants (1984)

Eugene Richards Jr. (born September 29, 1953) is an American former Major League Baseball (MLB) outfielder. He played eight seasons in the Majors, from 1977 until 1984, for the San Diego Padres and San Francisco Giants. As a rookie with San Diego in 1977, he set a modern-day MLB rookie single-season record for stolen bases. He currently resides in Reno, Nevada.

== Playing career ==
He was the first player selected (by the Padres) in the 1975 January Major League Baseball draft. He threw and batted left-handed, stood 6 feet (1.8 m) tall and weighed 175 pounds (79 kg). Richards played two seasons (1975–1976) of minor league baseball. In his first pro season, spent with the Class A Reno Silver Sox, he led the 1975 California League in hits (191 in 134 games played), runs (148), stolen bases (85) and batting average (.381). Reno won the California League championship and Richards was named the circuit's Most Valuable Player. Promoted all the way to the Triple-A Hawaii Islanders in 1976, he led the Pacific Coast League in hits (173) and batted .331.

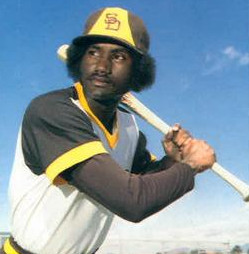
Richards in 1978

In 1977, he made his major league debut with San Diego and set a then modern-day MLB rookie record with 56 stolen bases during the season, (Note: Broken by Tim Raines with 71 in 1981.) surpassing the previous mark of 49 set by Rollie Zeider in 1910 and tied by Sonny Jackson in 1966. He finished the season batting .290, and finished third in the voting for the National League Rookie of the Year Award. (Note: Andre Dawson won the award, and Steve Henderson was runner-up.) In 1980, Richards was tied for 22nd place in MVP voting after he led the league in singles with 151, and set a then-Padres single-season record with 194 hits, broken by Tony Gwynn in 1984.

Richards held then-Padres career records for triples (63) and steals (242), also broken by Gwynn.

== See also ==
- List of Major League Baseball annual triples leaders
- List of Major League Baseball single-game hits leaders
