= Salinas Municipal Stadium =

Baseball park in Salinas, California

- Interactive map of Salinas Municipal Stadium
- Location: 175 Maryal Drive, Salinas, California 93906
- Coordinates: 36.697019°N 121.647074°W
- Owner: City of Salinas
- Capacity: 3,600 (1984-2005), 2,000 (1949)
- Surface: Natural grass
- Field size: Left Field: Center Field: Right Field:

Construction
- Opened: 1949
- Demolished: 2013

Tenants
- Salinas Colts, Sunset League (1949); Salinas Packers, California League (1954-58); Salinas Valley Mets, California League (1963-64); Salinas Indians, California League (1965); Salinas Packers, California League (1973-76); Salinas Angels, California League (1977-80); Salinas Spurs, California League (1982-87, 1989-92); Salinas Peppers, Western Baseball League (1995-97)

Salinas Municipal Stadium was a baseball park located in Salinas, California, United States. Opened in 1949, the stadium was the home field for the Salinas Colts, Salinas Packers, Salinas Indians, Salinas Spurs and Salinas Peppers. When it first opened, the stadium's seating capacity was 2,000. By 1984, it was 3,600.

The Stadium was demolished and replaced with Rabobank Stadium, a football stadium that will serve as home to the football teams of Hartnell College, North Salinas High School, and Palma High School.The stadium sat across the street from Madonna Del Sasso School.
