= California League Most Valuable Player Award =

- Sport: Baseball
- League: California League
- Awarded for: Regular season most valuable player of the California League
- Country: United States
- Presented by: California League

History
- First award: Spider Jorgensen (1941)
- Most recent: Easton Shelton (2026)

The California League Most Valuable Player Award (MVP) is an annual award given to the best player in minor league baseball's California League. In 1941, John Jorgensen won the first ever California League MVP Award. After the cancellation of the 2020 season, the league was known as the Low-A West in 2021 before reverting to the California League name in 2022.

First basemen, with 14 winners, have won the most among infielders, followed by shortstops (7), third basemen (5), and second basemen (4). Ten catchers have also won the award. Seven players who won the award were pitchers. Twenty-nine outfielders have won the MVP Award, the most of any position. Six players played during seasons for which position information is unavailable.

Eighteen players from the Brooklyn/Los Angeles Dodgers Major League Baseball (MLB) organization have won the MVP Award, more than any other, followed by the San Diego Padres organization (8); the California/Los Angeles Angels and San Francisco Giants organizations (6); the Minnesota Twins organization (5); the St. Louis Cardinals organization (4); the Colorado Rockies, Kansas City/Oakland Athletics, Milwaukee Brewers, and Seattle Mariners organization (3); the Arizona Diamondbacks, Baltimore Orioles, Boston Red Sox, Cincinnati Reds, Pittsburgh Pirates, and Tampa Bay Devil Rays organizations (2); and the Chicago Cubs, Cleveland Indians, Florida Marlins, Houston Astros, and New York Mets organizations (1). Six players competed for teams that were unaffiliated with Major League Baseball organizations.

== Key ==
*	Indicates multiple award winners in the same year
Position	Indicates the player's primary position if known

== Winners ==
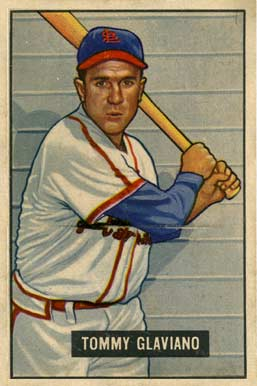
Tommy Glaviano, 1946 California League MVP

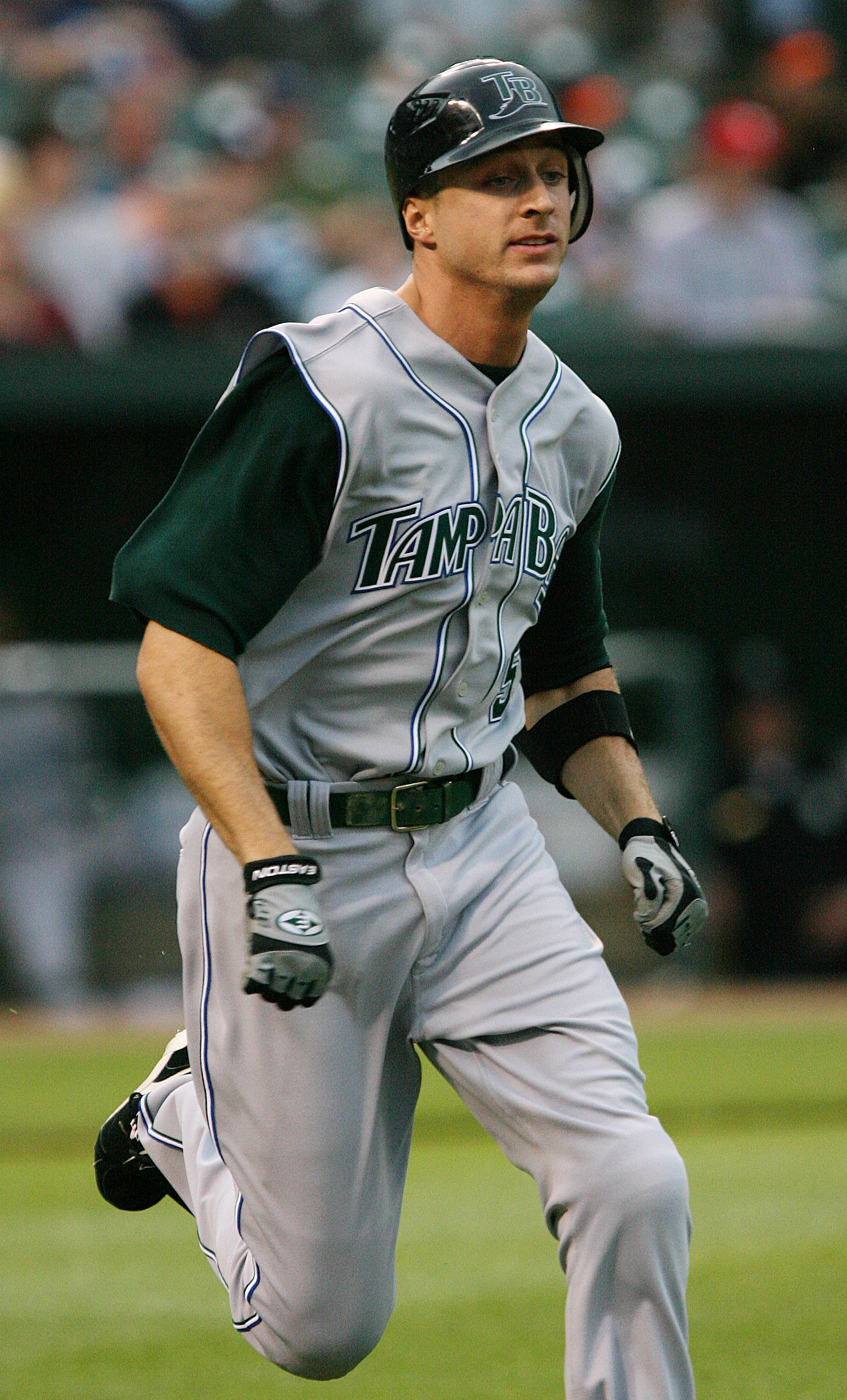
Rocco Baldelli, 2002 California League MVP

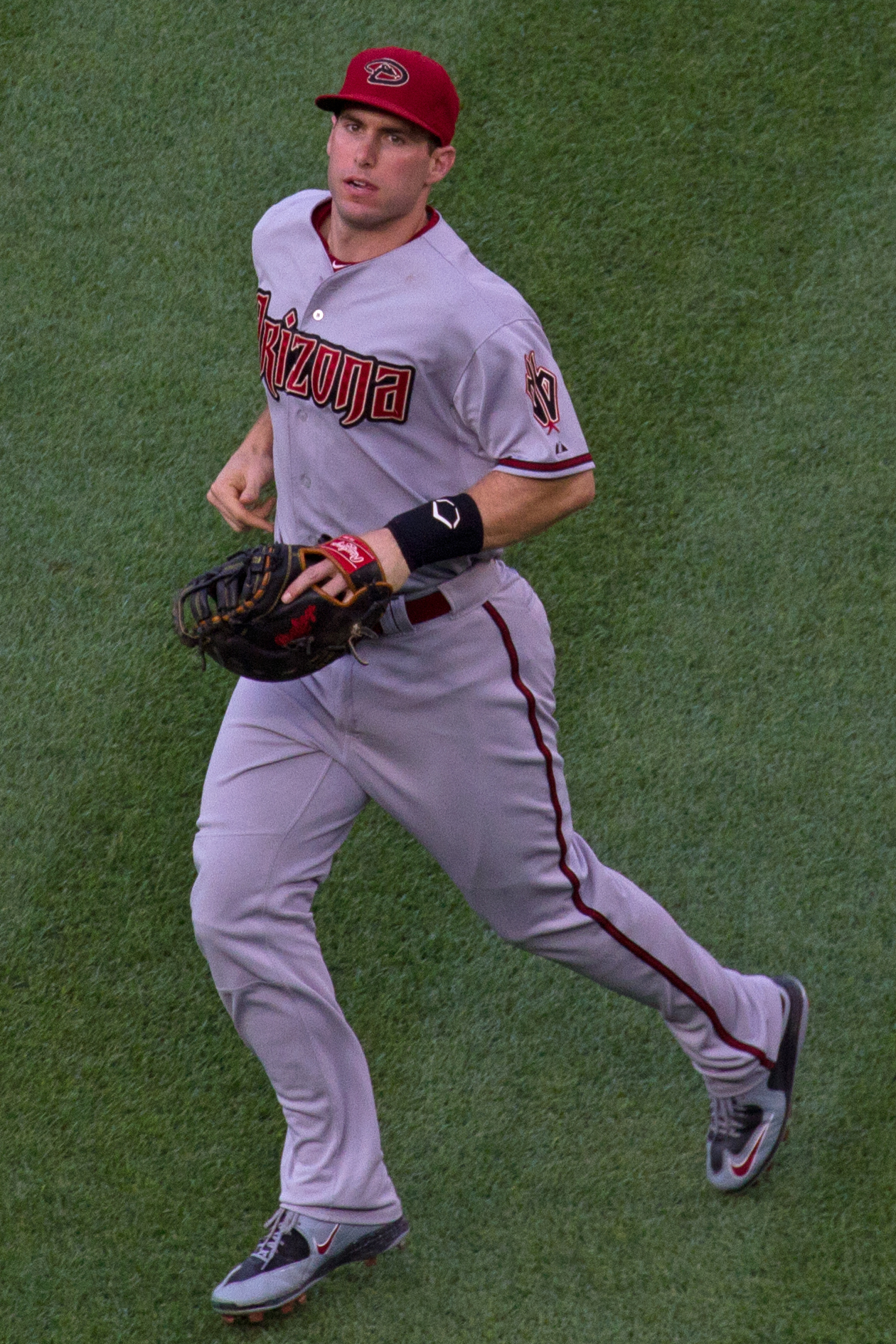
Paul Goldschmidt, 2010 California League MVP

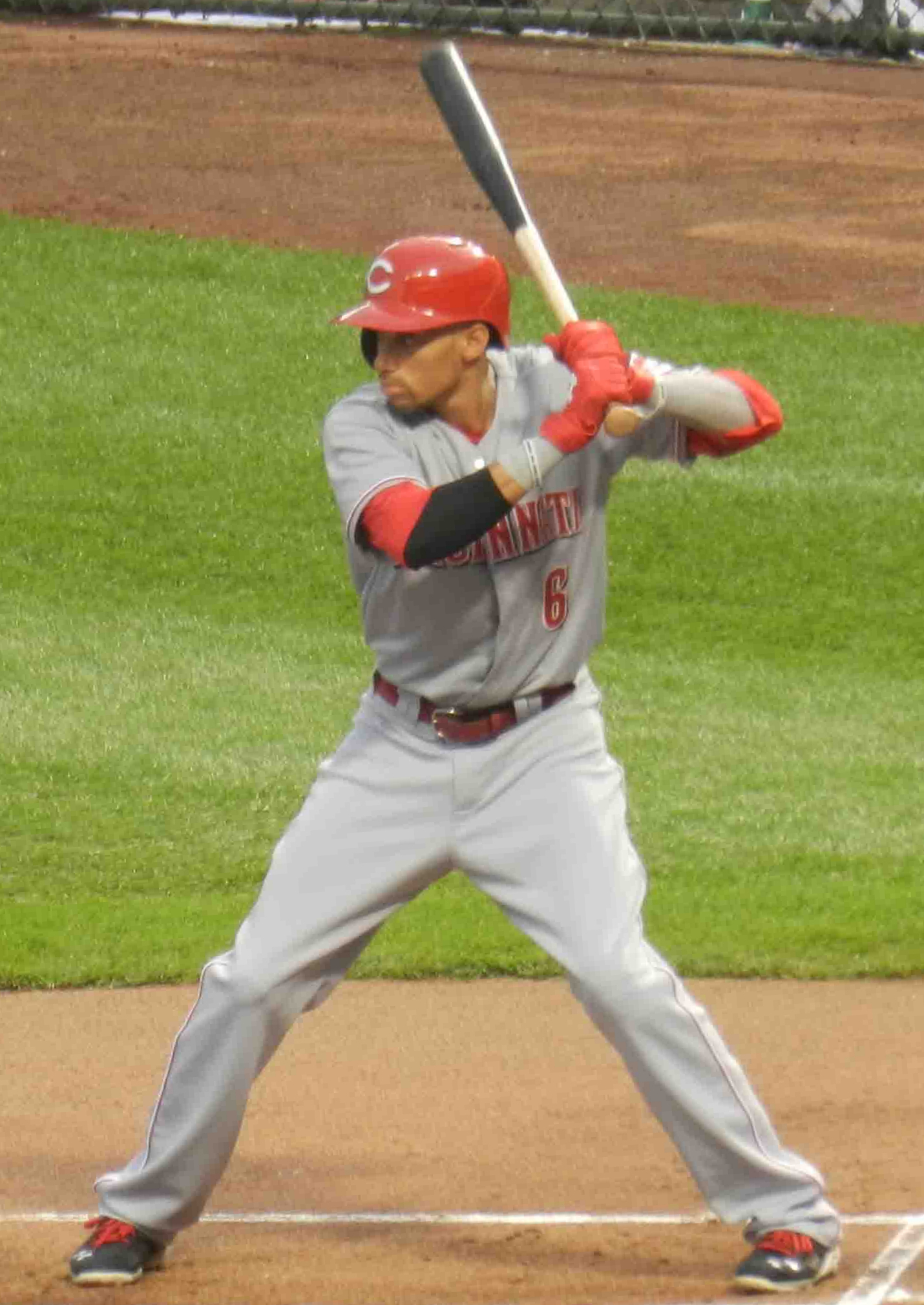
Billy Hamilton, 2012 California League MVP

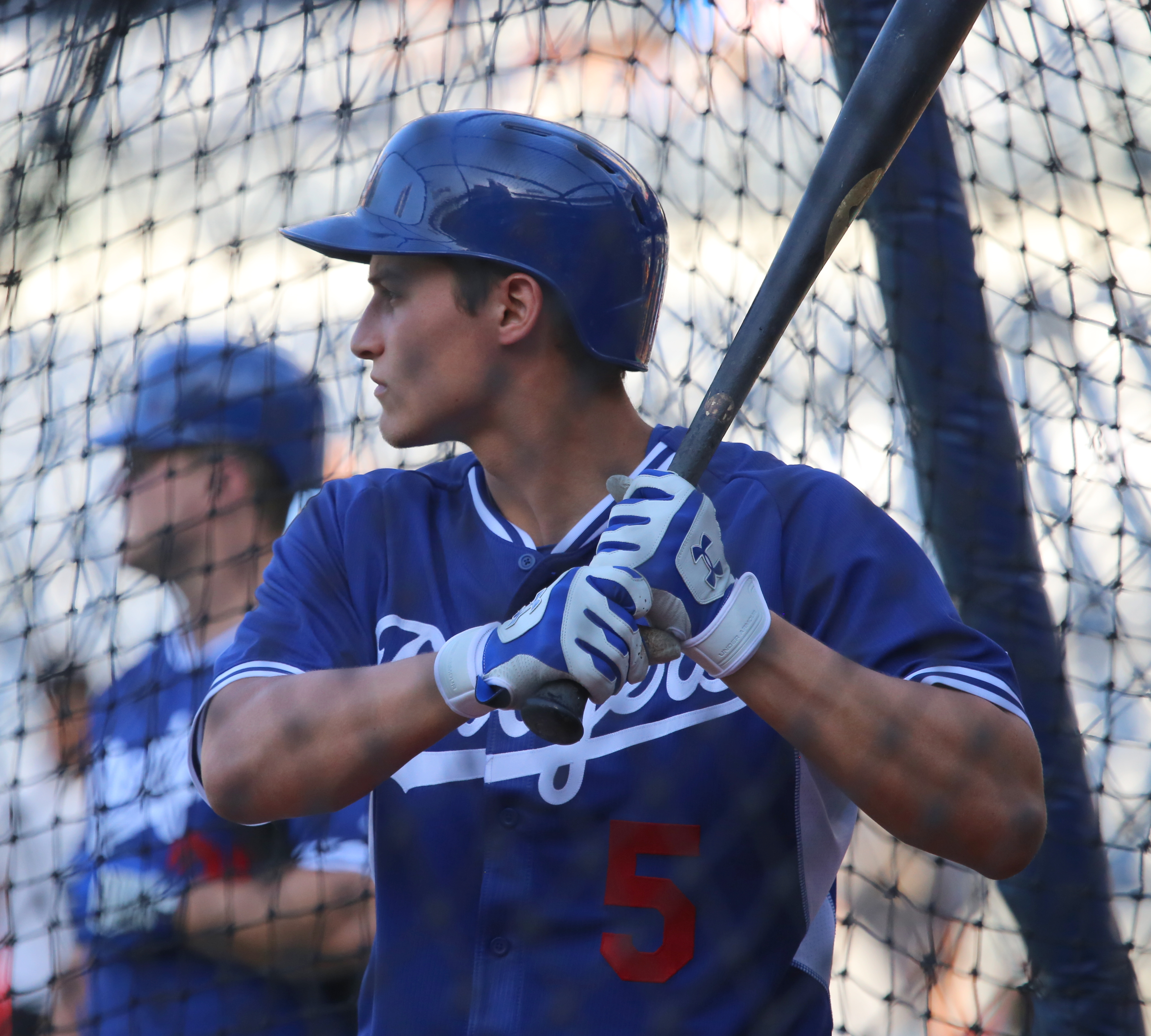
Corey Seager, 2014 California League MVP

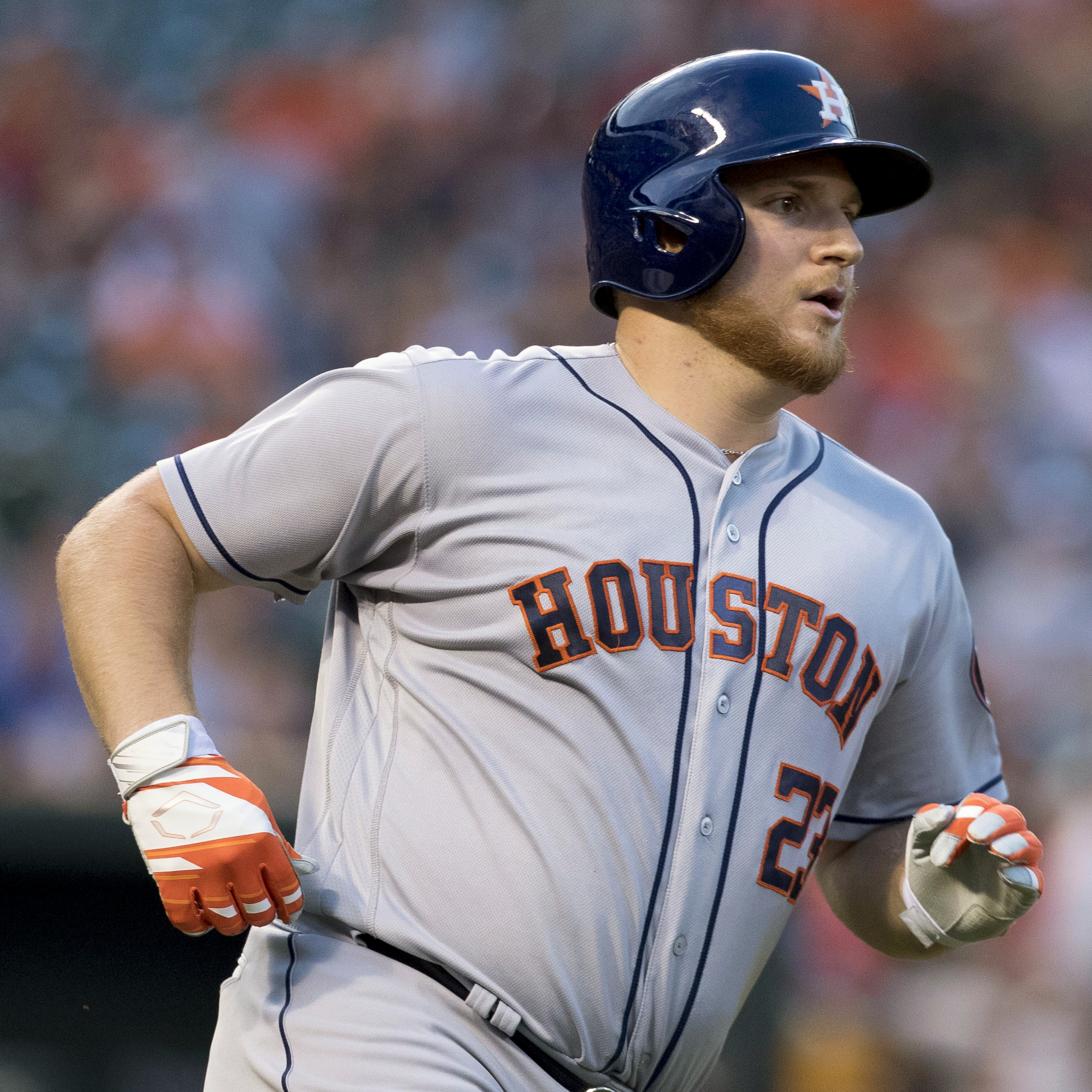
A. J. Reed, 2015 California League MVP

Year	Winner	Team	Organization	Position	Ref(s).
1941	Spider Jorgensen	Santa Barbara Saints	Brooklyn Dodgers	Third baseman	
1942	Sal Taormina	San Jose Owls	unaffiliated	Outfielder	
1946	Tommy Glaviano	Fresno Cardinals	St. Louis Cardinals	unknown	
1947	Ed Samcoff	Stockton Ports	unaffiliated	unknown	
1949	Earl Escalante	Bakersfield Indians	Cleveland Indians	Pitcher	
1950	Dick Wilson	Modesto Reds	Pittsburgh Pirates	First baseman	
1952	Larry Jackson	Fresno Cardinals	St. Louis Cardinals	Pitcher	
1953	Tex Clevenger	San Jose Red Sox	Boston Red Sox	Pitcher	
1954	Bob Thorpe	Stockton Ports	Chicago Cubs	Pitcher	
1955	Pumpsie Green	Stockton Ports	unaffiliated	unknown	
1956	Dick Whitman	San Jose JoSox	unaffiliated	unknown	
1957	Vada Pinson	Visalia Redlegs	Cincinnati Redlegs	unknown	
1958	Neil Wilson	Fresno Giants	San Francisco Giants	Catcher	
1959	Willie Davis	Reno Silver Sox	Los Angeles Dodgers	Outfielder	
1960	Robert Arrighi	Reno Silver Sox	Los Angeles Dodgers	Pitcher	
1961	Don Williams	Reno Silver Sox	Los Angeles Dodgers	Shortstop	
1962	William Haas	Reno Silver Sox	Los Angeles Dodgers	First baseman	
1963	José Vidal	Reno Silver Sox	Pittsburgh Pirates	Outfielder	
1964	Ollie Brown	Fresno Giants	San Francisco Giants	Outfielder	
1965	Mike Epstein	Stockton Ports	Baltimore Orioles	First baseman	
1966	Dave Duncan	Modesto Reds	Kansas City Athletics	Catcher	
1967	Leron Lee	Modesto Reds	St. Louis Cardinals	Outfielder	
1968	Ted Simmons	Modesto Reds	St. Louis Cardinals	Catcher	
1969	Junior Kennedy	Stockton Ports	Baltimore Orioles	Shortstop	
1970	Sonny Johnson	Bakersfield Dodgers	Los Angeles Dodgers	Outfielder	
1971	George Theodore	Visalia Mets	New York Mets	Outfielder	
1972	Skip James	Fresno Giants	San Francisco Giants	First baseman	
1973	John Balaz	Salinas Packers	California Angels	Outfielder	
1974	Gary Alexander	Fresno Giants	San Francisco Giants	Catcher	
1975	Gene Richards	Reno Silver Sox	unaffiliated	Outfielder	
1976	Thad Bosley	Salinas Angels	California Angels	Outfielder	
1977	Kelly Snider	Lodi Dodgers	Los Angeles Dodgers	First baseman	
1978	Steve Douglas	Visalia Oaks	Minnesota Twins	Outfielder	
1979*	Mike Marshall	Lodi Dodgers	Los Angeles Dodgers	First baseman	
1979*	Les Pearsey	Visalia Oaks	Minnesota Twins	Third baseman	
1980*	Jaime Cocanower	Stockton Ports	Milwaukee Brewers	Pitcher	
1980*	Candy Maldonado	Lodi Dodgers	Los Angeles Dodgers	Outfielder	
1981	Kent Hrbek	Visalia Oaks	Minnesota Twins	First baseman	
1982	Kevin McReynolds	Reno Padres	San Diego Padres	Outfielder	
1983	Stan Holmes	Visalia Oaks	Minnesota Twins	Catcher	
1984	Glenn Braggs	Stockton Ports	Milwaukee Brewers	Outfielder	
1985	Eric Hardgrave	Reno Padres	San Diego Padres	First baseman	
1986	Ty Dabney	Fresno Giants	San Francisco Giants	Third baseman	
1987	Luis Lopez	Bakersfield Dodgers	Los Angeles Dodgers	Catcher	
1988	Paul Faries	Riverside Red Wave	San Diego Padres	Second baseman	
1989	John Jaha	Stockton Ports	Milwaukee Brewers	First baseman	
1990	Frank Bolick	Stockton Ports; San Bernardino Spirit	Milwaukee Brewers; Seattle Mariners	unknown	
1991	Matt Mieske	High Desert Mavericks	San Diego Padres	unknown	
1992	Marty Cordova	Visalia Oaks	Minnesota Twins	Outfielder	
1993	Tim Clark	High Desert Mavericks	Florida Marlins	Outfielder	
1994	Todd Greene	Lake Elsinore Storm	California Angels	Catcher	
1995	Adam Riggs	San Bernardino Spirit	Los Angeles Dodgers	Second baseman	
1996	D. T. Cromer	Modesto A's	Oakland Athletics	Outfielder	
1997	Mike Stoner	High Desert Mavericks	unaffiliated	Outfielder	
1998	Brad Penny	High Desert Mavericks	Arizona Diamondbacks	Pitcher	
1999	Chin-Feng Chen	San Bernardino Stampede	Los Angeles Dodgers	Outfielder	
2000	Juan Silvestre	Lancaster JetHawks	Seattle Mariners	Outfielder	
2001	Xavier Nady	Lake Elsinore Storm	San Diego Padres	First baseman	
2002	Rocco Baldelli	Bakersfield Blaze	Tampa Bay Devil Rays	Outfielder	
2003	Josh Barfield	Lake Elsinore Storm	San Diego Padres	Second baseman	
2004	Brian Stavisky	Modesto A's	Oakland Athletics	Outfielder	
2005	Brandon Wood	Rancho Cucamonga Quakes	Los Angeles Angels of Anaheim	Shortstop	
2006	Reid Brignac	Visalia Oaks	Tampa Bay Devil Rays	Shortstop	
2007	Bubba Bell	Lancaster JetHawks	Boston Red Sox	Outfielder	
2008	Carlos Santana	Inland Empire 66ers	Los Angeles Dodgers	Catcher	
2009	Alex Liddi	High Desert Mavericks	Seattle Mariners	Third baseman	
2010	Paul Goldschmidt	Visalia Rawhide	Arizona Diamondbacks	First baseman	
2011	Kent Matthes	Modesto Nuts	Colorado Rockies	Outfielder	
2012	Billy Hamilton	Bakersfield Blaze	Cincinnati Reds	Shortstop	
2013	Zach Borenstein	Inland Empire 66ers	Los Angeles Angels of Anaheim	Outfielder	
2014	Corey Seager	Rancho Cucamonga Quakes	Los Angeles Dodgers	Shortstop	
2015	A. J. Reed	Lancaster JetHawks	Houston Astros	First baseman	
2016	Luis Urías	Lake Elsinore Storm	San Diego Padres	Second baseman	
2017	D. J. Peters	Rancho Cucamonga Quakes	Los Angeles Dodgers	Outfielder	
2018	Rylan Bannon	Rancho Cucamonga Quakes	Los Angeles Dodgers	Third baseman	
2019*	Luis Campusano	Lake Elsinore Storm	San Diego Padres	Catcher	
2019*	Luis Castro	Lancaster JetHawks	Colorado Rockies	First baseman	
2020	None selected (season cancelled due to COVID-19 pandemic)				
2021	Luis Matos	San Jose Giants	San Francisco Giants	Outfielder	
2022	Edgar Quero	Inland Empire 66ers	Los Angeles Angels	Catcher	
2023	Ryan Ritter	Fresno Grizzlies	Colorado Rockies	Shortstop	
2024	Lázaro Montes	Modesto Nuts	Seattle Mariners	Outfielder	
2025	Eduardo Quintero	Rancho Cucamonga Quakes	Los Angeles Dodgers	Outfielder	
2026	Easton Shelton	Ontario Tower Buzzers	Los Angeles Dodgers	First baseman	
