= Reno Silver Sox =

- 1947–1992; Reno, Nevada

Minor league affiliations
- Previous classes: Class-C (1947–1951); Class-A (1955–1992)
- League: California League (1955–1992)
- Previous leagues: Far West League (1950–1951); Sunset League (1947–1949)

Major league affiliations
- Previous teams: Oakland Athletics (1992); Minnesota Twins & San Diego Padres (1975–1976); Cleveland Indians (1966–1974); Pittsburgh Pirates (1963–1964); Los Angeles Dodgers (1957–1962); Brooklyn Dodgers (1956); New York Giants (1947–1949)

Minor league titles
- League titles: SL – 1948; CL – 1960, 1961, 1975, 1976

Team data
- Previous names: Reno Silver Sox (1955–1980, 1989–1992); Reno Padres (1981–1988); Channel Cities Oilers (1955)
- Colors: (1981-1985); Brown; Gold; White (1986-1987); Brown; Orange; White (1988-1992); Blue; Silver; White
- Ballpark: Moana Stadium

The Reno Silver Sox were a minor league baseball team that existed on and off from 1947 to 1992. The team name is derived from the nickname of Nevada, the "Silver State". From part of the 1955 season to 1992, they played their home games at Moana Stadium. The 1961 Silver Sox were recognized as one of the 100 greatest minor league teams of all time.

== History ==
After Reno first hosted a team in the 1907 Nevada State League, the Reno Silver Sox became members of the 1947 Sunset League and continued in the league from 1947 to 1949. They were affiliated with the New York Giants during their time in the Sunset League. From 1950 to 1951, they were unaffiliated and played in the Far West League. Starting in 1955, they played in the California League, when the Channel Cities Oilers moved to Reno to become the second incarnation of the Reno Silver Sox. They became affiliated with the Brooklyn Dodgers in 1956 and stayed affiliated with them until the Dodgers' move in 1957. They were then affiliated with the Los Angeles Dodgers until 1962. From 1963 to 1964, they were affiliated with the Pittsburgh Pirates. They did not organize in 1965, and therefore did not play ball. They came back in 1966 and lasted until 1981. From 1966 to 1974, they were affiliated with the Cleveland Indians. From 1975 to 1976 they were affiliated with both the Minnesota Twins and San Diego Padres. From 1977 to 1981, they were affiliated with just the Padres. After the 1981 season, the team was renamed the Reno Padres and baseball was not played under the "Reno Silver Sox" name again until 1988. Still in the California League, they were unaffiliated from 1988 to 1991. In 1992 – the last season in which a "Silver Sox" team played in an affiliated league – they were affiliated with the Oakland Athletics. Following the 1992 season, the team left Reno and move to Riverside to become the Riverside Pilots. In 1996, they moved to Lancaster and became the Lancaster JetHawks.

== Championships ==
The Reno Silver Sox were Sunset League champions in 1948, and California League champions in 1960, 1961, 1975, and 1976. They are the only team in California League history to win back-to-back championships twice.

== Legacy ==
In 2024, the Reno Aces of the Pacific Coast League revived the Reno Silver Sox name, colors and logo as a "throwback" identity that they wear for Thursday home games.

== Notable Reno alumni ==
Baseball Hall of Fame alumni

- Roberto Alomar (1986) Inducted, 2011
- Bobby Cox (1960) Inducted, 2014
- Dennis Eckersley (1972-1973) Inducted, 2004

Other notable alumni

- Larry Andersen (1973)
- Alan Ashby (1970-1971)
- Phil Cavarretta (1966-1967, MGR) 4 x MLB All-Star; 1945 NL Batting Title; 1945 NL Most Valuable Player
- Storm Davis (1987)
- Willie Davis (1959) 2 x MLB All-Star
- Ed Farmer (1968) MLB All-Star
- Tim Flannery (1978)
- Ray Fosse (1966) 2 x MLB All-Star
- Alfredo Griffin (1974) MLB All-Star; 1979 AL Rookie of the Year
- Ozzie Guillen (1982) 3 x MLB All-Star; 1985 AL Rookie of the Year
- Andy Hawkins (1979-1980)
- Jim Kern (1970-1971) 3 x MLB All-Star
- John Kruk (1982) 3 x MLB All-Star
- Duane Kuiper (1972)
- Jim Lefebvre (1962) MLB All-Star; 1965 NL Rookie of the Year
- John Lowenstein (1968-1969)
- Rick Manning (1972-1973)
- Pinky May (1970-1971, MGR) MLB All-Star
- Kevin McReynolds (1982)
- Ken McMullen (1961)
- Jeff Newman (1971-1972) MLB All-Star and manager
- Mike Norris (1991) MLB All-Star
- Gene Richards (1975)
- Pete Richert (1958) 2 x MLB All-Star
- Benito Santiago (1984) 5 x MLB All-Star; 1987 NL Rookie of the Year
- Eric Show (1979)
- Bill Singer (1962) 2 x MLB All-Star
- Charley Smith (1957)
- Dick Tidrow (1967-1971)
- Bobby Tolan (1963)
- Eddie Watt (1978-1979, MGR)
- Mitch Williams (1983-1984) MLB All-Star
- Butch Wynegar (1975) 2 x MLB All-Star

== Year-by-year record ==
Year	League	Record	Finish	Manager	Playoffs/Notes
1947	Sunset League	69-69	4th	Thomas Lloyd	
1948	Sunset League	77-63	3rd	Thomas Lloyd	League Champs
1949	Sunset League	49-75	7th	Lilio Marcucci	none
1950	Far West League	75-63	3rd	Joe Borich	Lost in 1st round
1951	Far West League	52-65	3rd	Cotton Pippen	
1955	California League	40-106 overall	8th	Leonard Noren	Channel Cities moved to Reno July 1
1956	California League	73-67	4th	Ray Perry	Lost in 1st round
1957	California League	79-59	2nd	Ray Perry	Lost League Finals
1958	California League	68-69	6th	Ray Perry	
1959	California League	81-58	2nd	Ray Perry	
1960	California League	89-51	1st	Tom Saffell	League Champs
1961	California League	97-43	1st	Roy Smalley	League Champs
1962	California League	70-68	4th	Roy Smalley	Lost League Finals
1963	California League	71-69	5th	Tom Saffell	
1964	California League	66-71	6th	Tom Saffell / Harvey Koepf	none
1966	California League	69-71	4th (t)	Phil Cavarretta	
1967	California League	56-82	8th	Phil Cavarretta	
1968	California League	67-72	5th	Clay Bryant	
1969	California League	72-68	3rd (t)	Ken Aspromonte	
1970	California League	79-61	2nd	Pinky May	none
1971	California League	64-75	7th	Pinky May	
1972	California League	50-88	8th	Lou Klimchock	
1973	California League	70-70	4th (t)	Lou Klimchock	
1974	California League	61-79	6th (t)	Joe Azcue / interim (June 29-July 3) / Del Youngblood	
1975	California League	86-54	1st	Harry Warner	League Champs
1976	California League	75-62	3rd	Johnny Goryl	League Champs
1977	California League	59-81	5th	Glenn Ezell	
1978	California League	62-78	5th	Eddie Watt	
1979	California League	74-67	3rd	Eddie Watt	
1980	California League	75-66	2nd (t)	Jack Maloof	
1981	California League	81-58	2nd	Jack Maloof	Lost in 1st round
1988	California League	39-103	10th	Nate Oliver	
1989	California League	68-74	6th	Eli Grba	
1990	California League	71-68	6th	Mike Brown	
1991	California League	59-77	7th	Mal Fichman	
1992	California League	65-71	8th	Gary Jones	
