= Sam Lynn Ballpark =

Baseball venue in Bakersfield, California

- "Historic" Sam Lynn Ballpark
- Interactive map of Sam Lynn Ballpark
- Location: 4009 Chester Avenue; Bakersfield, CA 93301
- Coordinates: 35.397556°N 119.022384°W
- Owner: Kern County Parks and Recreation
- Operator: Kern County Parks and Recreation
- Capacity: 3,500 permanent seats
- Surface: Grass
- Field size: Left Field: 328 feet Center Field: 354 feet Right Field: 328 feet Backstop: 50 feet

Construction
- Groundbreaking: December 3, 1940
- Opened: April 22, 1941
- Renovated: 1994

Tenants
- Bakersfield Blaze (CL) 1941–2016; Bakersfield Train Robbers (PL) 2017–present Wasco Reserve (PL) 2022

Sam Lynn Ballpark (also known as "Historic" Sam Lynn Ballpark) is a baseball venue in Bakersfield, California and was the oldest ballpark of the Class-A Advanced California League. It was built in 1941 for the Bakersfield Badgers, which began the 1941 season as a charter member of the California League. The ballpark's current tenant is called the Bakersfield Train Robbers, which plays in the Pecos League and are not affiliated with any team in Major or Minor League Baseball.

It is one of two ballparks in organized professional baseball where the batter faces west, causing them to directly face the sun (the other being Wahconah Park in Pittsfield, Massachusetts). This forces the Train Robbers to start most games later than any team in professional ball. From mid-June to mid-August, games can begin as late as 7:58 PM.

Sam Lynn Ballpark was named for the former local owner of a Coca-Cola bottling company who donated much of his income to youth baseball leagues in the area.

== Former teams ==
The following is a list of Bakersfield franchise names dating back to 1941.

Team	Years
Badgers	1941–1942
Indians	1946–1955
Boosters	1956
Bears	1957–1967
Dodgers	1968–1975
Outlaws	1978–1979
Mariners	1982–1983
Dodgers	1984–1994
Blaze	1995–2016

- note: Bakersfield did not field teams in 1943, 1945, 1980 and 1981.

== Structure ==
Sam Lynn Ballpark originally featured a covered wooden grandstand that was demolished in 1993 and replaced with the current concrete main stand. It has the shortest center field in all of professional baseball at 354 feet from home plate. The outfield wooden wall is 15 feet high and, in right field, there is a catwalk that is located under the current electronic scoreboard. The site of the catwalk used to be the location of a hand-operated scoreboard. The catwalk remains, and any ball hit onto it is a home run.

Sam Lynn Ballpark's playing field was renovated for the 2006 season. The first-base (home) dugout has been expanded to hold more players, though many still sit on a bench outside of the dugout. The third-base (away) dugout retains its original smaller design prompting most players to either sit on the front edge or an adjacent bench located in foul ground.. Starting the 2015 season, the Mariners organization opted to swap dugouts, placing the home team on the opposite side of the permanent seats. This was not met with enthusiasm by the fans or by sponsors.

Prior to the start of the 2006 season, the bullpens, previously located behind the stands and hidden from the view of the teams playing the game, were moved into foul territory. Due to this change, the overall seating capacity of the ballpark was reduced by 700 general admission bleacher seats, from 4,200 to 3,500.

There are several large illustrations of former star players who played in Bakersfield that greet fans as soon as they walk into the ballpark. Some of the former players honored on canvas include Hall of Famer Don Drysdale, Cy Young winner Pedro Martínez, NL ROY Eric Karros, Hall of Famer Mike Piazza, and former Rays outfielder Rocco Balldelli. Apparently, these banners were removed during the latest renovations to the stadium.

== History ==
=== Orientation ===
Sam Lynn Ballpark's faces west (into the setting sun).

Due to the setting sun creating a potential hazard for batters, night games were scheduled for several decades with an 8:00 PM start. Years later, night games were scheduled for earlier starting times then delayed in progress until the sun had set and it was safe for the batters. The last in-game sun delay took place on July 3, 1996 and lasted three minutes. Since 1997, the game's first pitch during the summer months takes place after the sun sets and is based on a timetable that has been updated annually by the official scorer. During this part of the season, the time of the game's first pitch ranges from 7:15 PM to 7:45 PM. A large steel and sheet metal screen (125 by 50 feet) was constructed in left-center field, but it only offers a minimal amount of help since the measurements for the sun screen were taken during the off season prior to 1993 when the setting sun was not a factor.

The question of the ballpark's strange construction was finally solved by Kevin Eubanks, then-editor of Bakersfield Life Magazine. Eubanks, a former public address announcer for the Bakersfield Blaze, discovered documentation that stated that the ballpark was built inside the one-mile oval horse racing track at what was the original Kern County Fairgrounds, on Chester Avenue.

According to a December 4, 1940 article appearing in the town's newspaper, The Bakersfield Californian, the story begins: "Preliminary work of grading and planting grass seed was under way today by the county work relief department within the mile track at the fairgrounds in preparation for the 1941 baseball season, when Bakersfield will be represented in a Class C professional league. Present plans call for moving lights over from the softball diamond, constructing dressing rooms, and depending largely the present grandstand for seating facilities." In that era, night games across America were usually scheduled for 8 or 8:15 PM starts thus it really didn't matter, except for tradition, which way the ballparks faced, especially in the lower minors when ballparks were built pretty rapidly with WPA funding. It wasn't until the 1970s that starting times across America began moving earlier, first 7:30 then later around 7:15 PM.

== Future ==
There have been calls to replace Sam Lynn Ballpark since the 1980s, but serious considerations have only come along since the rise of numerous California League teams building top-rate facilities, such as Rancho Cucamonga, Lancaster, Lake Elsinore, Stockton, Adelanto (High Desert), and San Bernardino (Inland Empire). The City of Bakersfield and Kern County have both been presented with proposals to build a new facility, and both refused to finance it. This caused the then-Major League parent club Los Angeles Dodgers to relocate their California League affiliate from Bakersfield after the 1994 season.

In 2012, new owners of The Blaze announced plans for a new stadium; scheduled to open in 2014. Unfortunately, funding needed for this new ballpark was not completed by the agreed-upon date, and the team's ownership then reverted to the previous owner. In August 2016, the California League announced that the Blaze would not be returning for the 2017 season.

On December 15, 2016, it was announced that the Pecos League's Train Robbers franchise (previously based in Las Vegas, New Mexico and Topeka, Kansas) would move to Bakersfield and Sam Lynn Ballpark for the 2017 season.
