= Bakersfield Blaze =

- 1941–2016; Bakersfield, California

Team logo	Cap insignia

Minor league affiliations
- Previous classes: Class A – Advanced (1990–2016); Class A (1964–1989); Class C (1941–1942, 1946–1962)
- Previous leagues: California League

Major league affiliations
- Previous teams: Seattle Mariners (2015–2016); Cincinnati Reds (2011–2014); Texas Rangers (2005–2010); Tampa Bay Devil Rays (2001–2004); San Francisco Giants (1997–2000); Co-Op (1995–1996); Los Angeles Dodgers (1984–1994); Seattle Mariners (1982–1983); Los Angeles Dodgers (1968–1975); Philadelphia Phillies (1958–1967); Chicago Cubs (1957); Philadelphia Phillies (1956); Brooklyn Dodgers (1954–1955); Detroit Tigers (1953); Cleveland Indians (1946–1952)

Minor league titles
- League titles (2): 1970; 1989

Team data
- Name: Bakersfield Blaze (1995–2016); Bakersfield Dodgers (1984–1994); Bakersfield Mariners (1982–1983); Bakersfield Outlaws (1978–1979); Bakersfield Dodgers (1968–1975); Bakersfield Bears (1957–1967); Bakersfield Boosters (1956); Bakersfield Indians (1946–1955); Bakersfield Badgers (1941–1942)
- Mascot: Torch (2011–2016); Heater (2012–2016, 2003–2010); Rookie the Dalmatian (1995–2002)
- Previous parks: Sam Lynn Ballpark

The Bakersfield Blaze were a minor league baseball team in Bakersfield, California. They played in the California League at the Class A-Advanced level, hosting home games at Sam Lynn Ballpark. Opened in 1941, the stadium is well known for facing the setting sun and its shallow 354-foot (108 m) center field fence, and seats 3,500 fans.

Near the end of the 2008 season, it was rumored that the Blaze would move to the Carolina League after the following season. However, Minor League Baseball president Pat O'Conner announced in February 2009 that they would remain in the California League.

The Blaze were sold by David Elmore of the Elmore Sports Group to local Bakersfield businessmen Gene Voiland and Chad Hathaway just prior to the 2012 season. The new ownership renovated Sam Lynn Ballpark in time for Opening Day and announced in November 2012 that a new ballpark would be ready for the 2014 season. However, financing plans for a new stadium failed to meet the $30 million target and team ownership was reclaimed by former owner David G. Elmore. As a result, the California League began looking for a new home for the team. However, in August 2016, the California League announced that the Blaze would not be returning for the 2017 season. The team played its final game on September 12, 2016.

The Fayetteville Woodpeckers replaced the Blaze at the Advanced-A level, however the Fayetteville Woodpeckers are not the continuation of the Blaze.

== Year-by-year record ==
Year	Record	Finish in Northern Division	Manager	Playoffs
1941	73–67	3rd	Frank Morehouse / Les Powers	Lost in 1st round 3 games to 1 vs Santa Barbara
1942	22–45	4th	Jack Colbern / Rex Cecil / Lee Dempsey	League suspended operations on June 28
1946	72–58	3rd	Martin Metrovich / Tony Governor	Lost in 1st round 3 games to 2 vs Stockton
1947	66–74	5th	Tony Governor	
1948	70–70	5th (t)	Harry Griswold	
1949	85–54	1st	Harry Griswold	Lost in 1st round 3 games to 2 vs Ventura
1950	61–79	6th	Harry Griswold	
1951	58–89	8th	Wimpy Quinn	
1952	70–70	5th	Gene Lillard	
1953	75–65	2nd	Ray Perry	Lost in 1st round 3 games to 0 vs Stockton
1954	80–60	2nd (t)	Ray Perry	Lost in 1st round 3 games to 1 vs San Jose
1955	61–85	5th	Doc Alexson	
1956	48–92	8th	Art Lilly / Dick Wilson	
1957	64–75	6th	Dick Wilson / Babe Herman	
1958	84–55	2nd	Paul Owens	Lost in 1st round 2 games to 1 vs Visalia
1959	70–71	4th	Paul Owens	Lost League Finals 4 games to 2 vs Modesto
1960	74–66	3rd	Lou Kahn	
1961	82–58	2nd	Lou Kahn	
1962	67–72	6th (t)	Bob Wellman	
1963	78–62	2nd	Bob Wellman	
1964	56–83	8th	Moose Johnson	
1965	66–74	5th	Dick Teed	
1966	68–72	6th	Dick Teed	
1967	70–68	4th	Nolan Campbell	
1968	61–79	7th	Don Williams	
1969	67–73	6th	Don LeJohn	
1970	93–46	1st	Don LeJohn	League Champs – Best Overall Regular Season Record – No Playoffs (Best Record in Bakersfield History)
1971	56–82	8th	Don LeJohn	
1972	88–52	1st	Don LeJohn	Lost League Finals 2 games to 0 vs Modesto
1973	70–70	4th	George Freese	Lost League Finals 2 games to 0 vs Lodi
1974	65–75	5th	George Freese	
1975	60–80	8th	Ron Brand	
1978	48–92	8th	George Culver	
1979	63–77	9th	Ron Mihal	
1982	64–76	8th	Ken Pape	
1983	68–72	6th	Greg Mahlberg	
1984	68–72	4th	Don LeJohn	Won 1st round 2 games to 1 vs Fresno, Lost League Finals 3 games to 1 vs Modesto
1985	65–80	6th	Mel Queen	
1986	40–102	10th	Don LeJohn	
1987	78–65	4th	Kevin Kennedy	
1988	71–71	6th	Gary LaRocque	
1989	82–60	3rd	Tim Johnson	Won 1st round 3 games to 1 vs San Bernardino League Champs Defeated Stockton 3 games to 0
1990	80–62	3rd	Tom Beyers	Won 1st round 3 games to 2 vs Visalia, Lost League Finals 3 games to 2 vs Stockton
1991	85–51	2nd	Tom Beyers	Lost in 1st round 3 games to 0 vs High Desert
1992	68–68	7th	Tom Beyers	
1993	42–94	10th	Rick Dempsey	
1994	69–67	5th	John Shelby	
1995	58–82	8th (t)	Greg Mahlberg	
1996	39–101	10th	Graig Nettles	
1997	62–78	8th	Glenn Tufts / Keith Bodie	
1998	49–91	10th	Frank Reberger	
1999	64–76	7th	Keith Comstock	
2000	80–60	2nd	Lenn Sakata	Lost in 1st round 2 games to 1 to Visalia
2001	71–69	5th (t)	Charlie Montoyo	Defeated Stockton 2 games to 1 in 1st round, Trailed 2 games to 1 in Division finals vs San Jose when post season cancelled due to 9/11*
2002	69–72	6th (t)	Charlie Montoyo	
2003	70–70	8th	Omer Munoz	
2004	59–81	8th	Mako Oliveras	
2005	68–72	7th	Arnie Beyeler	
2006	58–82	10th	Carlos Subero	
2007	57–83	9th	Carlos Subero	
2008	62–78	9th	Damon Berryhill	
2009	75–65	5th	Steve Buechele	Defeated Modesto 2 games to 1 in 1st round, Lost North Div Finals 3 games to 2 vs San Jose
2010	67–73	7th	Bill Haselman	
2011	66–74	6th	Ken Griffey, Sr.	
2012	72–68	5th	Ken Griffey, Sr.	Won first half championship. Lost North Div Finals in 5 games to Modesto
2013	55–85	5th	Ken Griffey, Sr.	
2014	78–62	2nd	Pat Kelly	First Half Champion (lost to Visalia in Divisional Finals)
2015	61–79	5th	Eddie Menchaca	
2016	76–64	8th (t)	Eddie Menchaca	Defeated San Jose 2 games to 1 in 1st round, Lost Nort Div Finals 3 games to 0 vs Visalia

== Notable former Bakersfield players ==
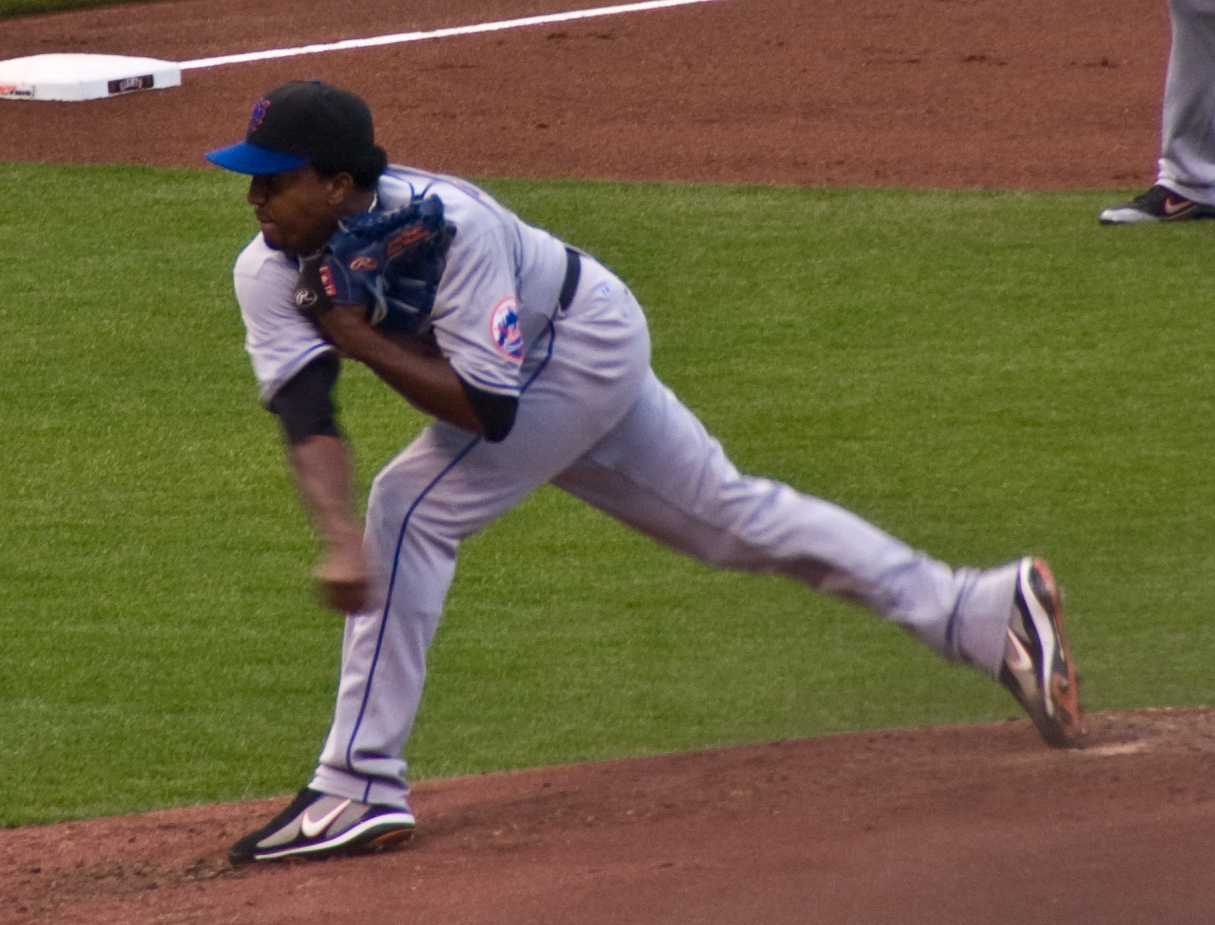
Pedro Martínez

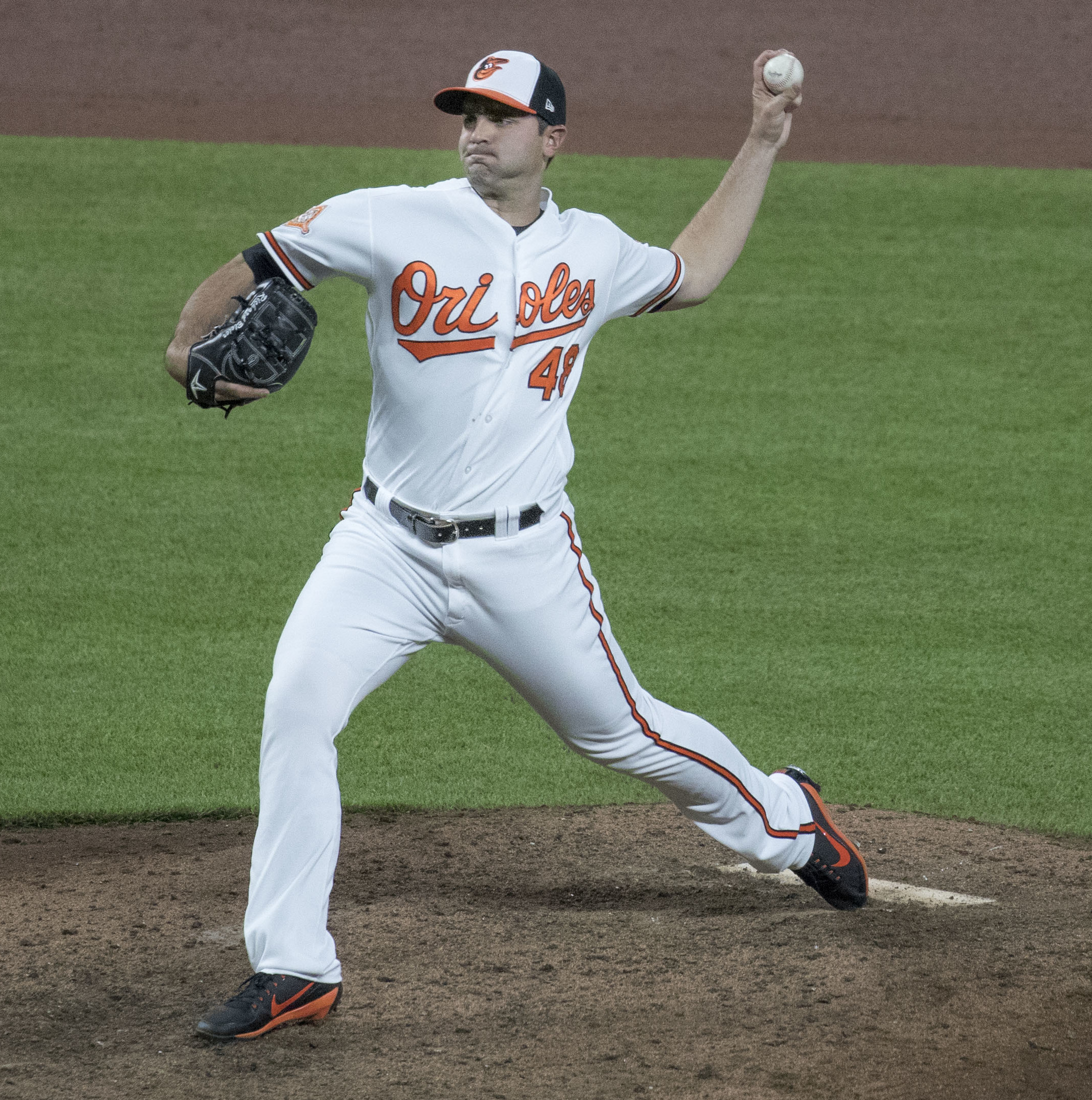
Richard Bleier

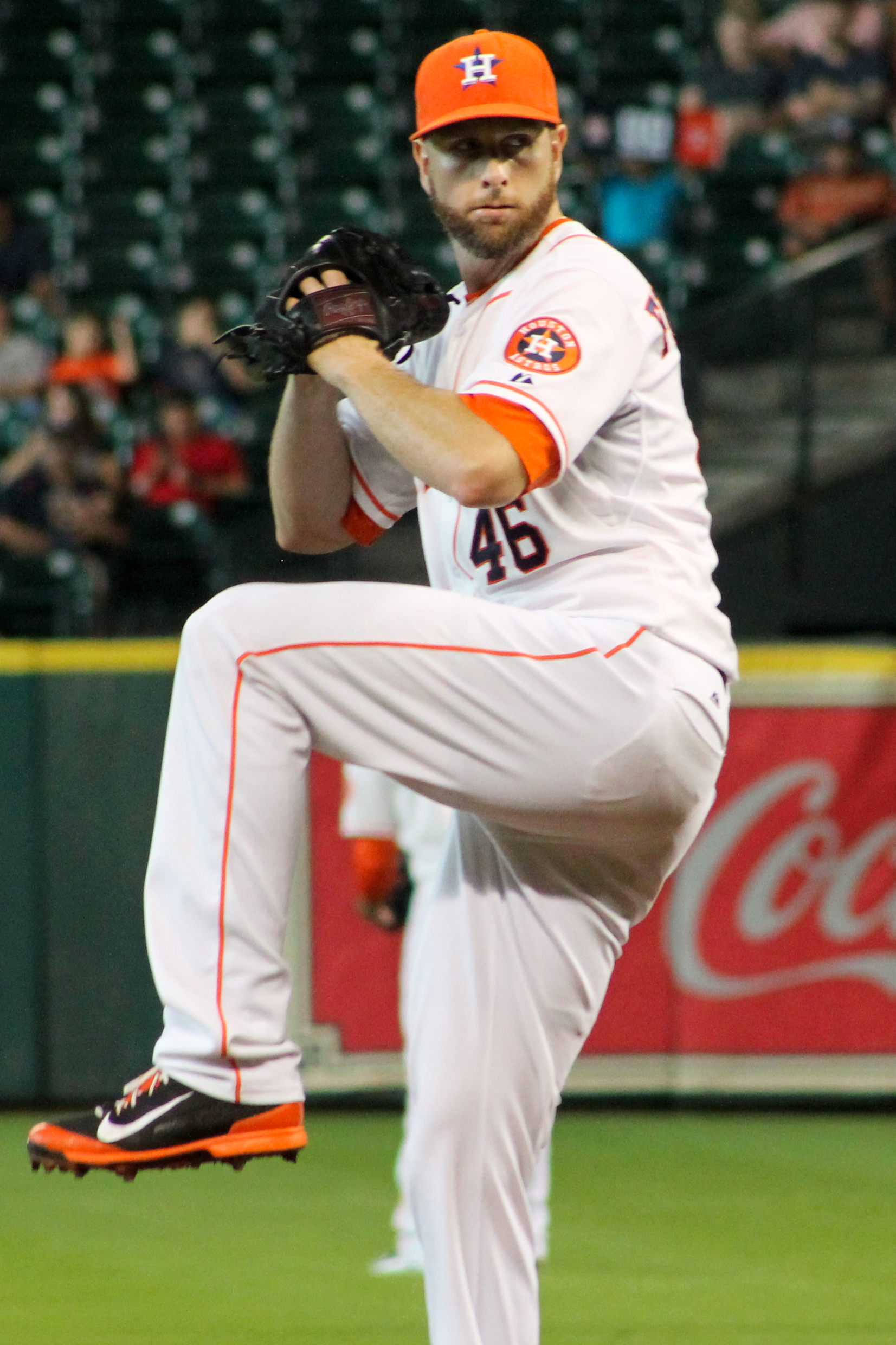
Scott Feldman

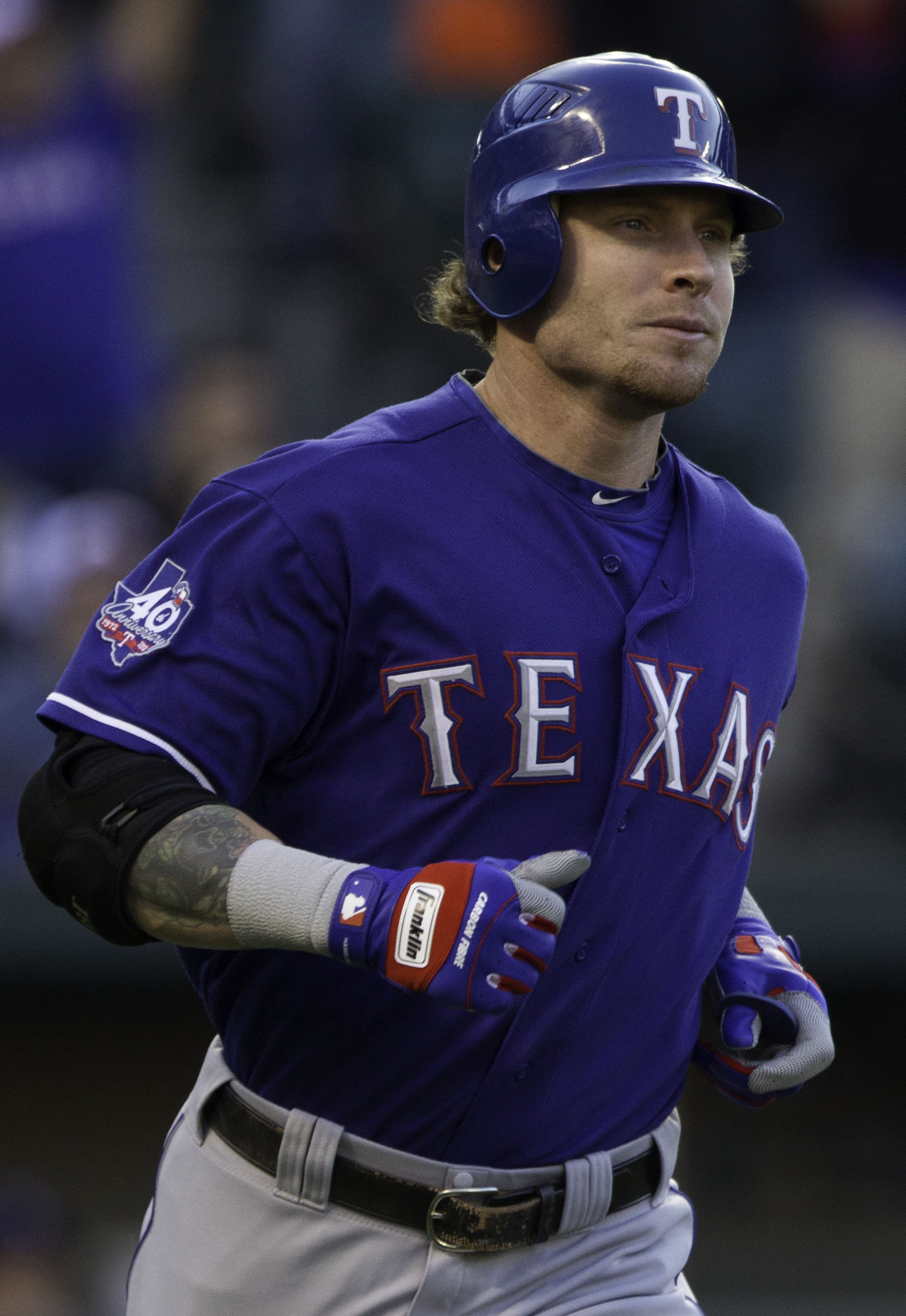
Josh Hamilton

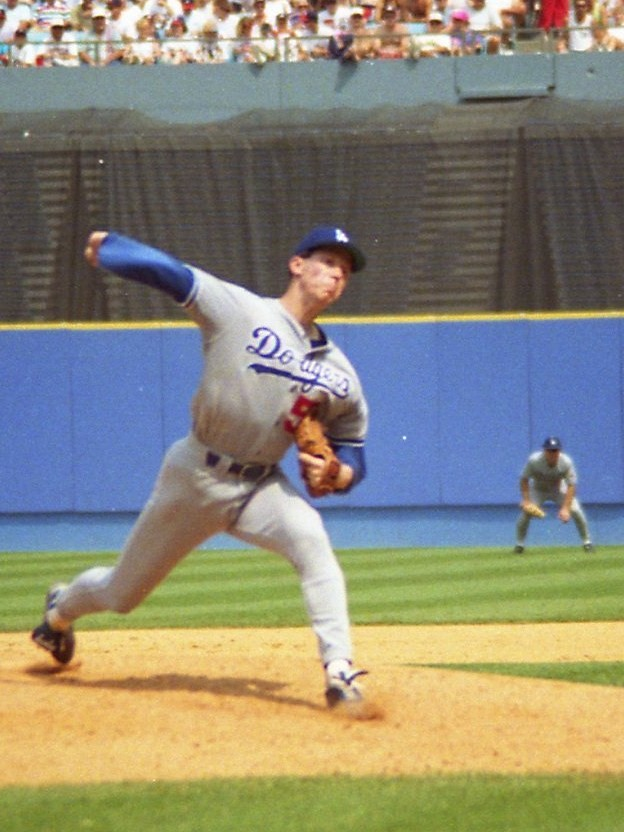
Orel Hershiser

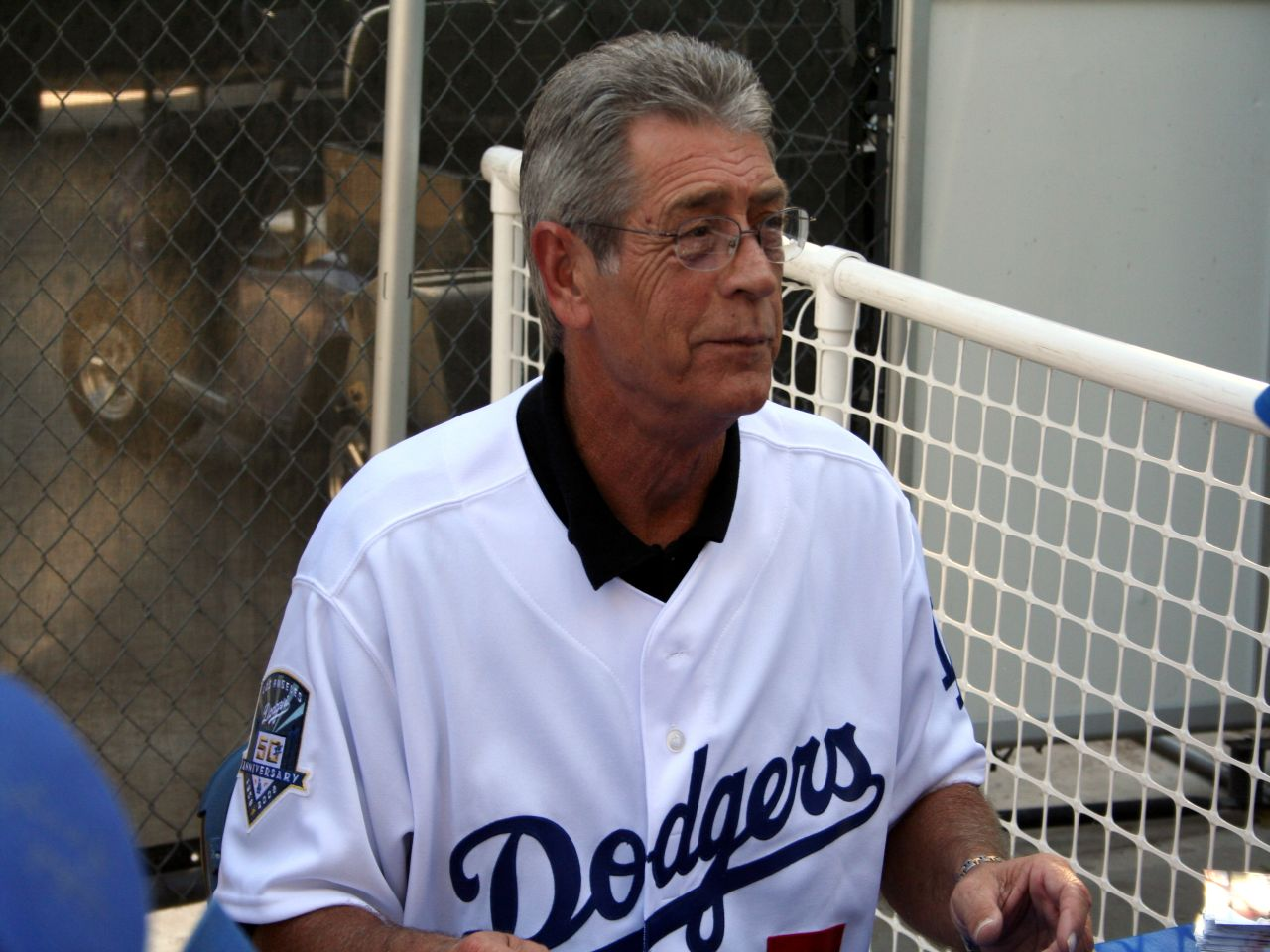
Steve Yeager

=== Baseball Hall of Fame alumni ===
- Don Drysdale (1954) Inducted, 1984
- Pedro Martínez (1991) Inducted, 2015
- Mike Piazza (1991) Inducted, 2016
- Don Sutton (1987) Inducted 1998

=== Notable alumni ===
- Pedro Astacio (1990)
- Elvis Andrus (2007) 2x MLB All-Star
- Richard Bleier (2009)
- Larry Bowa (1967) 5x MLB All-Star; 2001 NL Manager of the Year
- Phil Bradley (1982) MLB All-Star
- Johnny Callison (1957) 4x MLB All-Star
- Ron Cey (1969) 6x MLB All-Star; 1981 World Series MVP
- John Danks (2005)
- Chris Davis (2007) MLB All-Star; 2013 AL RBI Leader
- Ivan DeJesus (1971, 1973)
- Don Demeter (1954)
- Rick Dempsey (1993, Mgr) 1983 World Series MVP
- Edwin Díaz (2015) 3x MLB All-Star; 3x Reliever of the Year
- Scott Feldman (2005)
- Jonny Gomes (2002)
- Juan Guzman (1987) MLB All-Star; 1996 AL ERA Leader
- Tom Goodwin (1990)
- Yasmani Grandal (2011) MLB All-Star
- Juan Guzman (1987) MLB All-Star; 1996 AL ERA Leader
- Josh Hamilton (2002) 5x MLB All-Star; 2010 AL MVP
- Jason Hammel (2004)
- Orel Hershiser (1991) 1988 NL Cy Young Award
- Derek Holland (2008)
- Todd Hollandsworth (1992) 1996 NL Rookie of the Year
- Jay Howell (1992) 3x MLB All-Star
- Tommy Hunter (2008)
- Grant Jackson (1962-) MLB All-Star
- Eric Karros (1989) 1992 NL Rookie of the Year
- Kevin Kennedy (1987, Mgr)
- Lee Lacy (1970)
- Mark Langston (1982) 4x MLB All-Star
- Paul LoDuca (1994) 4x MLB All-Star
- Mike Marshall (1962) 2x MLB All-Star; 1974 NL Cy Young Award
- Ramón Martínez (1986)
- Raul Mondesi (1991) MLB All-Star; 1994 NL Rookie of the Year
- Jon Moscot (2013)
- Joe Nathan 6x MLB All-Star
- Jeff Nelson (1986) MLB All-Star
- Graig Nettles (1986, Mgr) 6x MLB All-Star
- Hideo Nomo 1995 NL Rookie of the Year
- José Offerman (1989) 2x MLB All-Star
- Tyler O'Neill (2015)
- Tom Paciorek (1968) MLB All-Star
- Henry Rodríguez (1989) MLB All-Star
- Jerry Royster (1971)
- Bill Russell (1968) 3x MLB All-Star
- James Shields (2003-2004) MLB All-Star
- Mario Soto (1988) 3x MLB All-Star
- Rick Sutcliffe (1975) 3x MLB All-Star; 1979 NL Rookie of the Year; 1982 AL ERA Leader; 1984 NL Cy Young Award
- John Tudor (1989)
- Edinson Vólquez (2006-2007)
- John Wetteland (1986) 3x MLB All-Star; 1996 World Series MVP
- C. J. Wilson (2005) 2x MLB All-Star
- Rick Wise (1963) 2x MLB All-Star
- Todd Worrell (1993) 1986 NL Rookie of the Year
- Steve Yeager (1969)
