= Modern Woodmen Field =

Stadium in California, United States

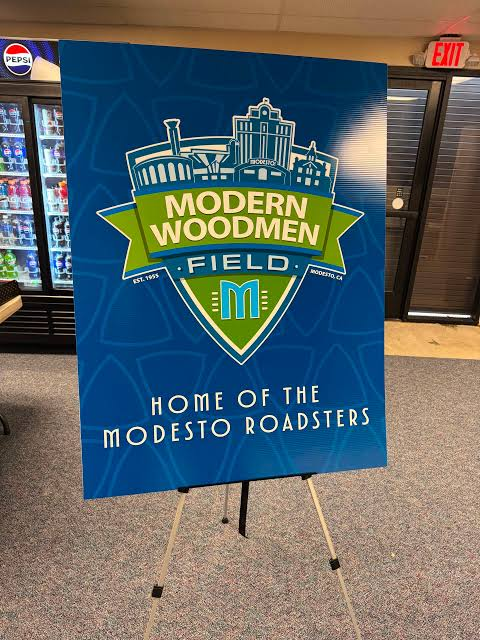

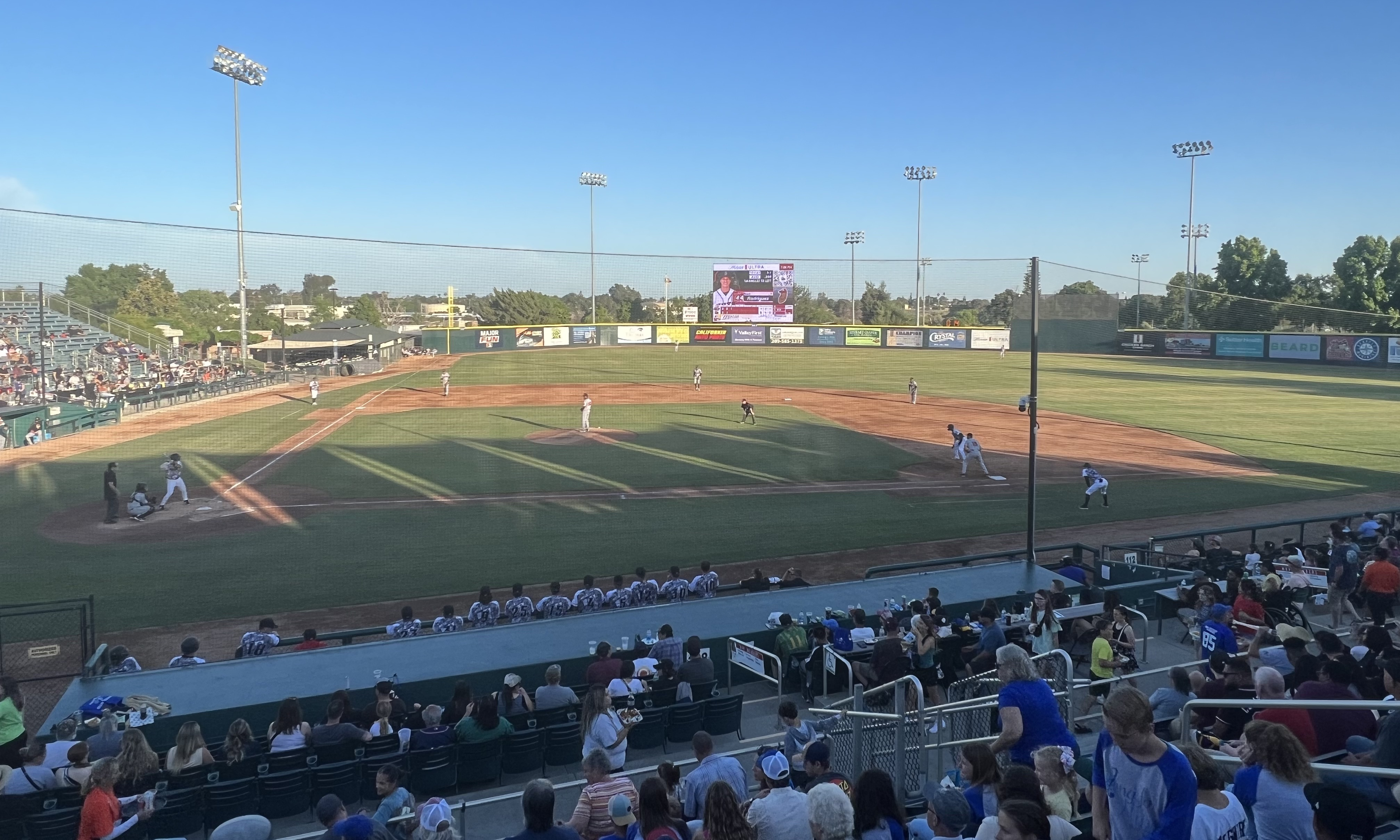
- Interactive map of Modern Woodmen Field
- Former names: Del Webb Field (1955–1983), John Thurman Field (1983-2026)
- Location: 601 Neece Drive; Modesto, California 95351
- Coordinates: 37.622658°N 121.000814°W
- Owner: City of Modesto
- Operator: City of Modesto
- Capacity: 4,000 (Baseball); 7,500 (Concerts)
- Surface: Grass
- Field size: Left field: 312 feet (95 m); Left-center: 393 feet (120 m); Center field: 400 feet (120 m); Right-center: 370 feet (110 m); Right field: 319 feet (97 m); Backstop: 30 feet (9.1 m)

Construction
- Groundbreaking: 1954
- Opened: April 15, 1955
- Renovated: 1997
- Cost: $3.93 Million (renovation)
- Architects: L.D. Astorino & Associates, Ltd. (renovation)
- General contractor: Acme Construction Company (renovation)

Tenants
- Modesto Nuts (CL) (2005–2025); Modesto Roadsters (PL) (2026–present)

Modern Woodmen Field is a 4,000-seat stadium in Modesto, California. It is primarily used for baseball as the home field of the Modesto Roadsters MLB Partner League team of the Pioneer League beginning in 2026 and was previously home to the Modesto Nuts Minor League Baseball team of the California League from 2005 to 2025. It was built in 1955 and was later named for California State Assemblyman John E. Thurman from Modesto. It was renamed again in 2026 following the sale of naming rights to Modern Woodmen of America.

== History ==
Originally named Del Webb Field, the Modesto ballpark was renamed for state assemblyman John Thurman in 1983 and underwent over $3.93 million worth of renovations prior to the start of the 1997 season to keep it up to California League standards. There were additional improvements before the 2007 season.

The Nuts drew well, improving attendance in five consecutive seasons through 2011, with the franchise winning Organization of the Year awards from the league.

After the city and the Seattle Mariners were unable to come to terms on who would pay for the roughly $32 million in improvements to the field mandated by Major League Baseball, the Nuts planned to leave Modesto after the 2024 season. However, the city and the team came to an agreement in August 2024 to keep the team in Modesto for another year. The Nuts would pay an annual rent of $600,000 and an additional $75,000 going towards improving the field. A long-term lease agreement was not reached by April 1, 2025, and the team left following the season. The final game at Thurman Field was on August 31.

== Notable events ==
On April 7, 2007, left-hander Randy Johnson made an appearance for the Arizona Diamondbacks affiliate, the Visalia Oaks. Johnson's appearance drew significant interest, with more than 5,000 fans attending the game.

On June 22, 2019, Regulo Caro, Ramón Ayala and Banda El Recodo performed at the stadium.
