= Moana Stadium =

Baseball stadium in Reno, Nevada

- Location in Nevada Location in the United States Location in North America
- Interactive map of Moana Stadium
- Address: Moana Lane west of Virginia Street
- Location: Reno, Nevada, U.S.
- Coordinates: 39.490157°N 119.801397°W
- Owner: City of Reno
- Operator: City of Reno
- Capacity: 3,500 (1950); 1,500 (1961); 4,000 (1971); 3,520 (1998)
- Surface: Natural grass
- Field size: Left Field: 339 ft (103 m); Center Field: 420 ft (130 m); Right Field: 339 ft (103 m)

Construction
- Opened: 1946; 80 years ago
- Renovated: 1961
- Demolished: 2012; 14 years ago

Tenants
- Reno Silver Sox (Sunset League) (1947); Reno Silver Sox (Far West League) (1947–1951); Reno Silver Sox (California League) (1961–1964, 1966–1981 and 1988–1992); Reno Padres (California League) (1982–1987); Reno Chukars (Western Baseball League) (1996–1998); Reno Blackjacks (Western Baseball League) (1999)

Moana Stadium was a stadium in Reno, Nevada. It was primarily used for baseball. Teams that called the stadium home included the Reno Silver Sox, Reno Padres, Reno Chukars and Reno Blackjacks. The ballpark had a capacity of 4,000 people. Moana Stadium was part of a city sports park. The stadium was demolished in 2012 to make room for a new city pool and athletic fields on the site.

== History ==
Hosted the Reno Oilers in the 1955 season which was the first professional team to use the stadium for their home field.

The Reno Silver Sox used the stadium as their home field for the first time in 1947–1951. Various incarnations of the team played in the stadium again in 1955–1964, 1966–1981, 1988–1992 and 2006-2008.

The Triple-A Tucson Sidewinders relocated to Reno in 2009 to become the Reno Aces. The city collaborated to build a new stadium in downtown Reno which would host the Aces and other city and state events. The presence of the new stadium, Greater Nevada Field, rendered Moana Stadium useless. The independent Reno Astros used the stadium in 2009, but the stadium was vacant for three years following that season. In 2011, plans were drawn up to demolish the stadium and nearby Moana Pool to construct several public soccer fields and a new city pool and aquatics center. Parts of the stadium were auctioned off to the public in April 2012. The demolition of Moana Stadium was completed over a two-day stretch in July 2012.
