= List of California League stadiums =

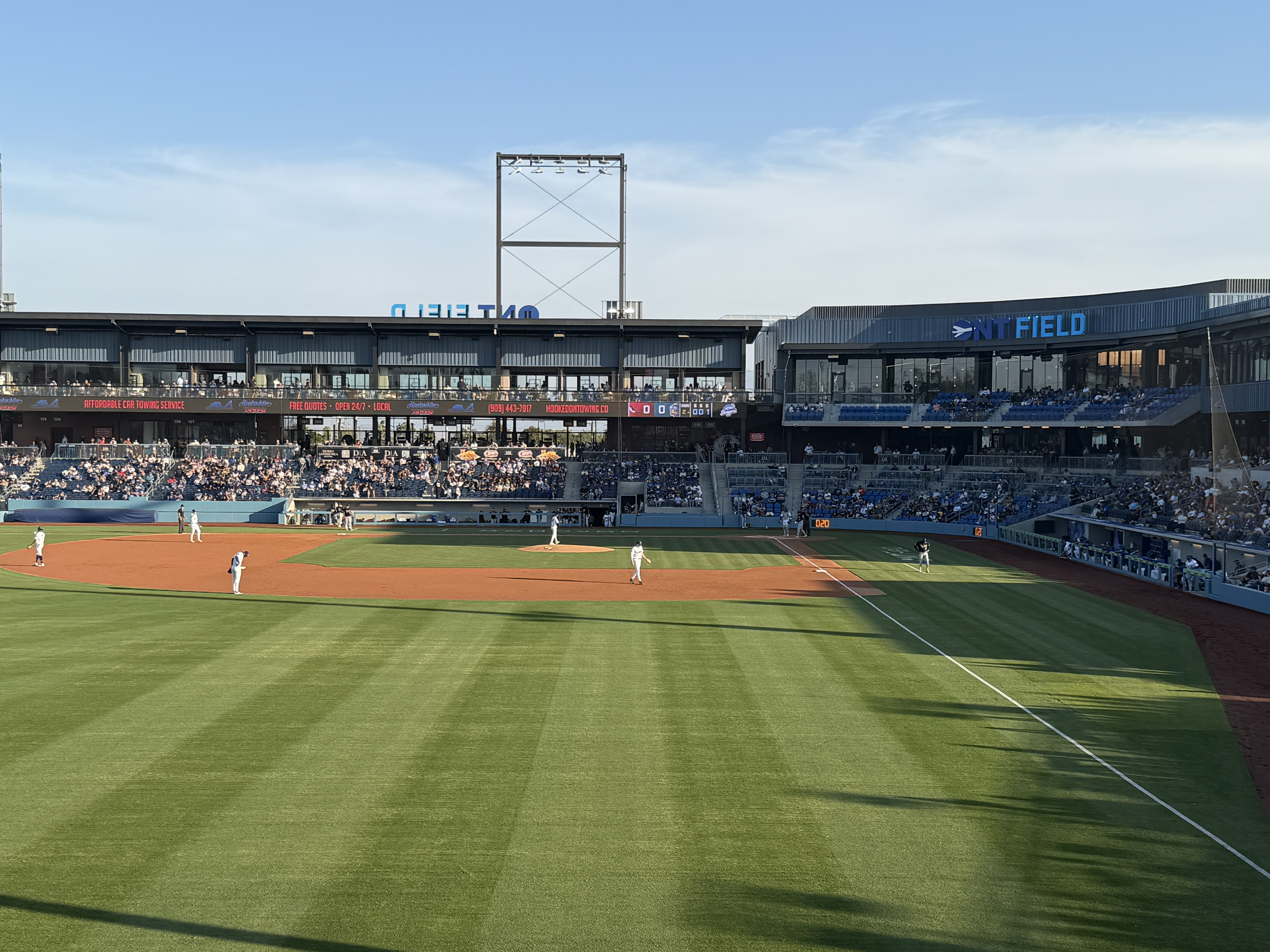
ONT Field in Ontario, California, is the home of the Ontario Tower Buzzers.

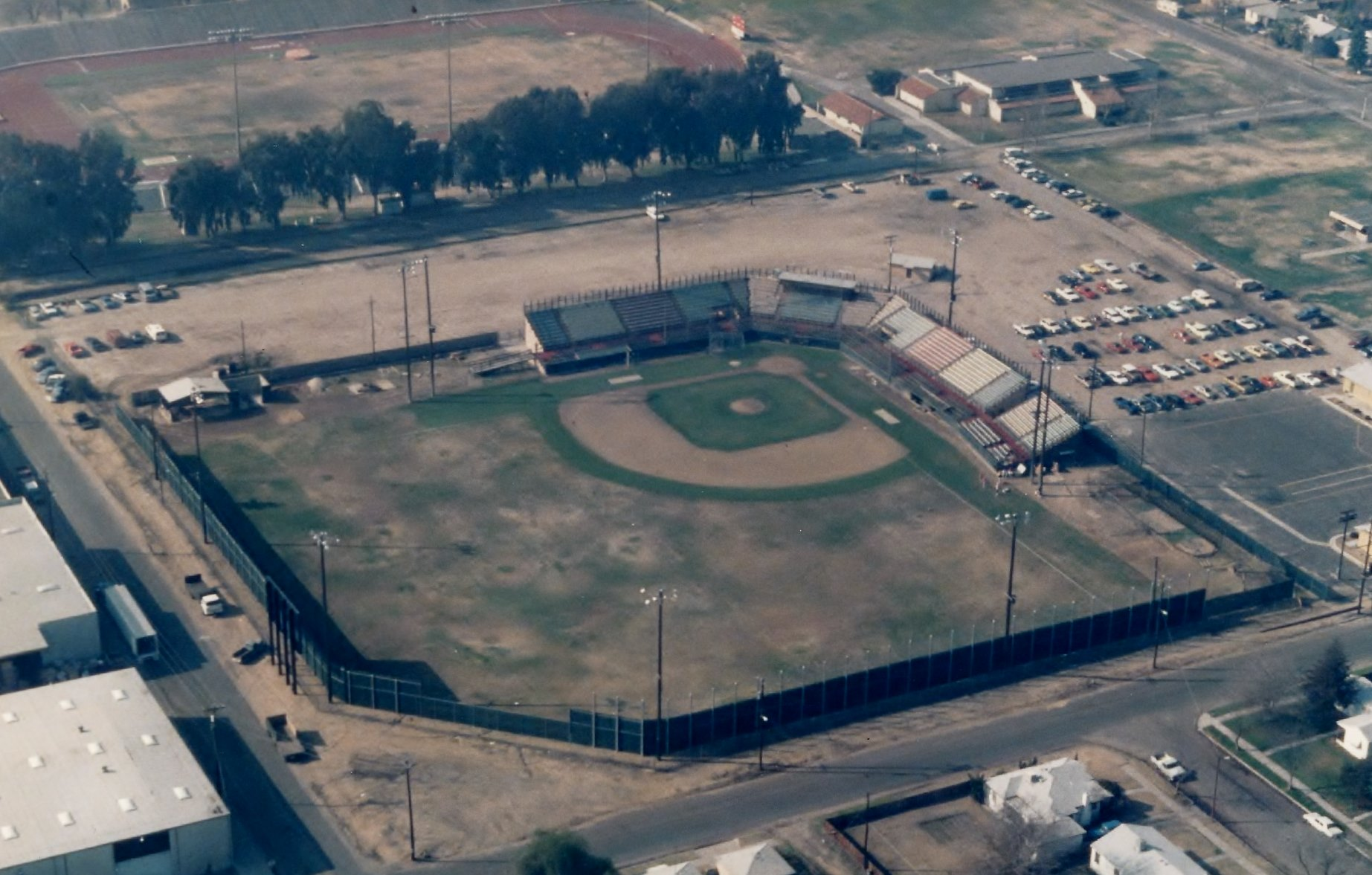
John Euless Park, originally called Cardinal Field, was home to several teams in Fresno, California.

There are eight stadiums in use by California League (CL) baseball teams, all located in California. The oldest stadium is Excite Ballpark (1942) in San Jose, home of the San Jose Giants. The newest stadium is ONT Field (2026) in Ontario, home of the Ontario Tower Buzzers. Two stadiums were built in the 1940s, three in the 1990s, two in the 2000s, and one in the 2020s. The highest seating capacity is 10,650 at Chukchansi Park in Fresno, where the Fresno Grizzlies play. The lowest capacity is 2,468 at Valley Strong Ballpark in Visalia, where the Visalia Rawhide play.

Since its founding in 1941, there have been approximately 30 stadiums located among over 20 municipalities used by the league. Of the stadiums with known opening dates, the oldest to have hosted CL games was Fiscalini Field (1935) in San Bernardino, former home of the San Bernardino Stars and San Bernardino Spirit. ONT Field is also the newest, while Chukchansi Park also has the highest known seating capacity among all CL stadiums. The stadium with the lowest known capacity is Ventura College's baseball field in Ventura, former home of the Ventura County Gulls, which seats only 1,400.

== Active stadiums and map ==
Current stadium locations:
- North Division
- South Division

| Name | Team | City in California | Opened | Capacity | Ref. |
|---|---|---|---|---|---|
| Chukchansi Park | Fresno Grizzlies | Fresno | 2002 | 10,650 | |
| ONT Field | Ontario Tower Buzzers | Ontario | 2026 | 6,500 | |
| Excite Ballpark | San Jose Giants | San Jose | 1942 | 4,200 | |
| Banner Island Ballpark | Stockton Ports | Stockton | 2005 | 5,300 | |
| San Manuel Stadium | Inland Empire 66ers | San Bernardino | 1996 | 8,000 | |
| Lake Elsinore Diamond | Lake Elsinore Storm | Lake Elsinore | 1994 | 7,866 | |
| Morongo Field | Rancho Cucamonga Quakes | Rancho Cucamonga | 1993 | 6,200 | |
| Valley Strong Ballpark | Visalia Rawhide | Visalia | 1946 | 2,468 | |

=== Gallery ===
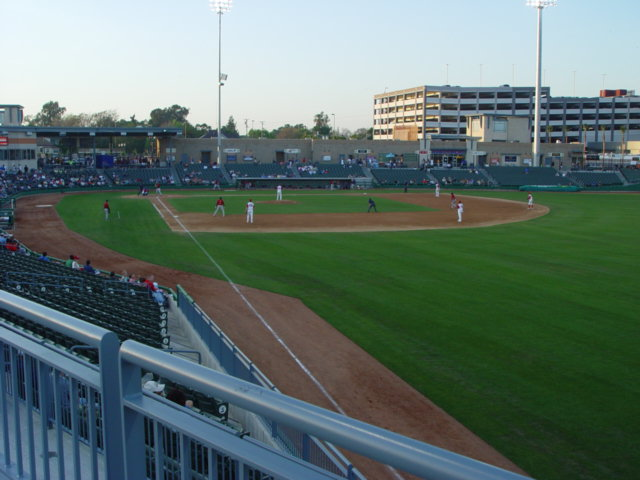
Banner Island Ballpark (Stockton Ports)

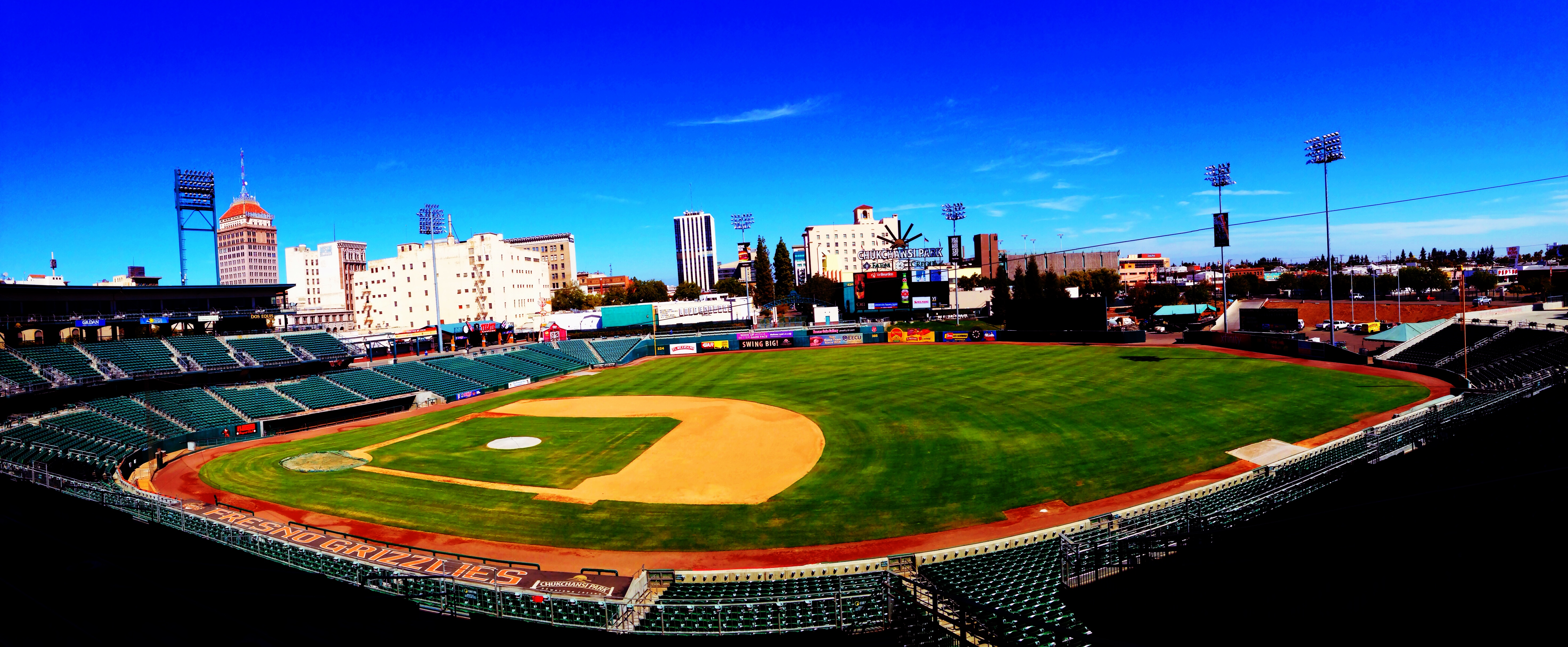
Chukchansi Park (Fresno Grizzlies)

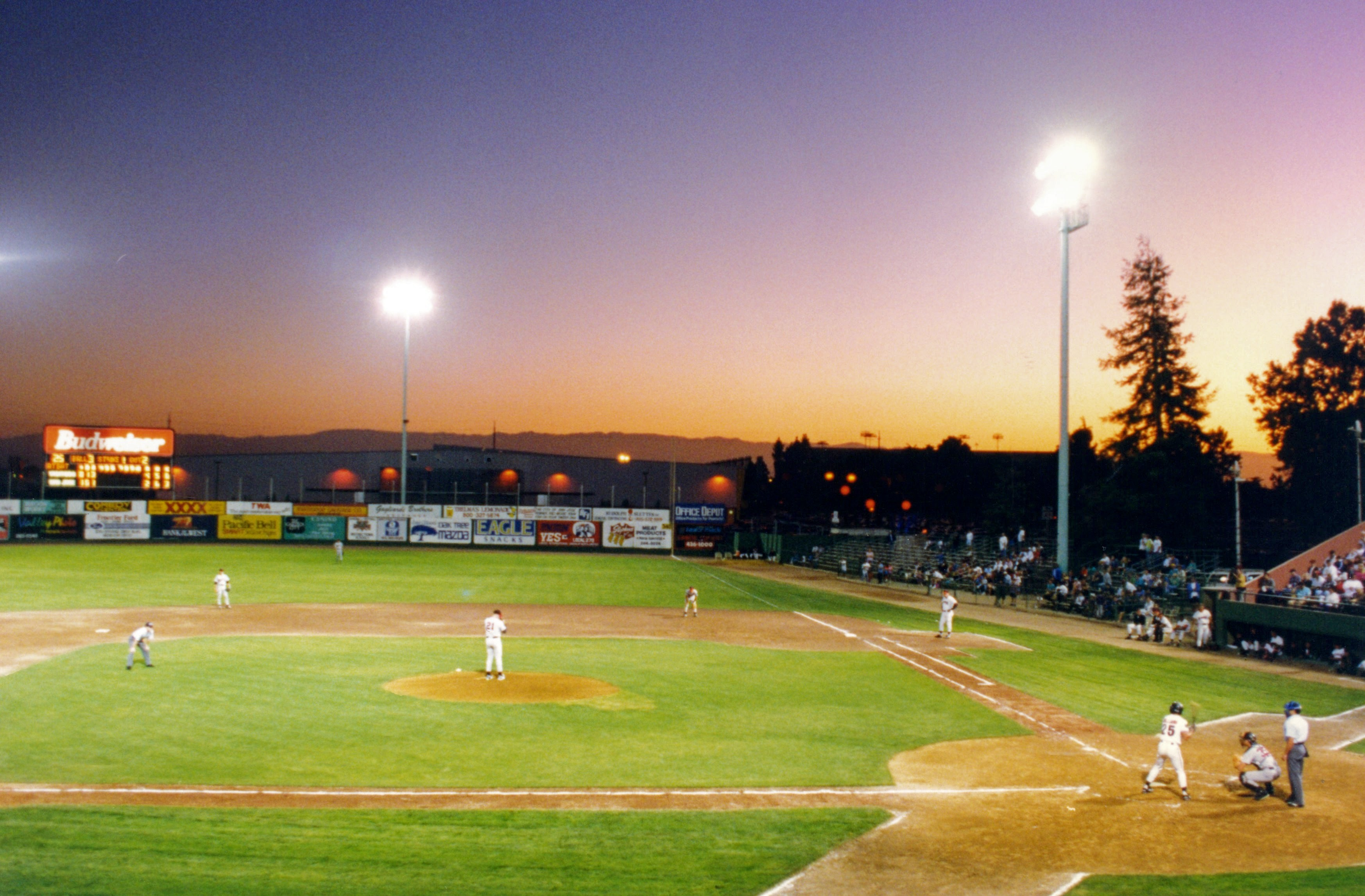
Excite Ballpark (San Jose Giants)

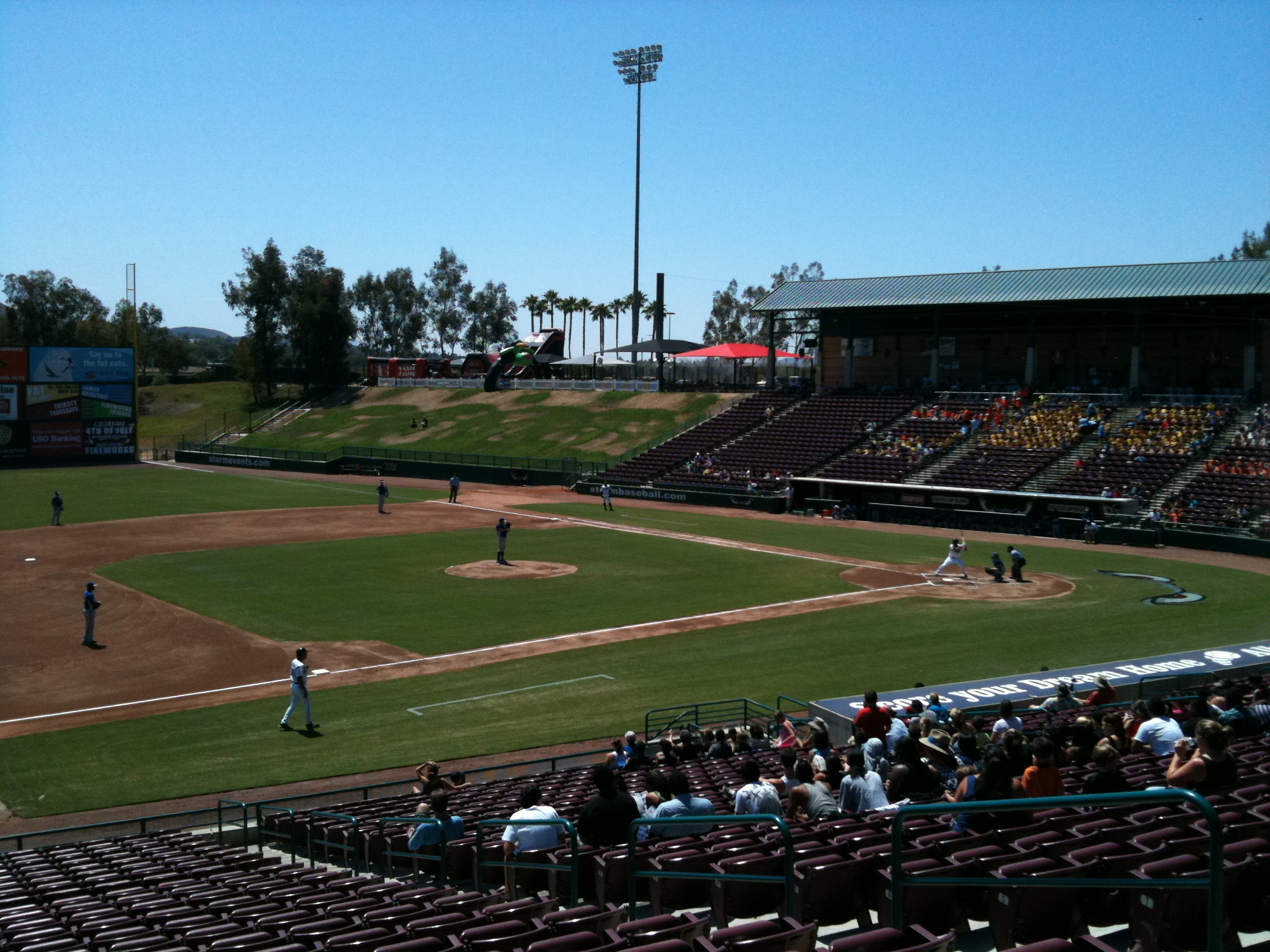
Lake Elsinore Diamond (Lake Elsinore Storm)

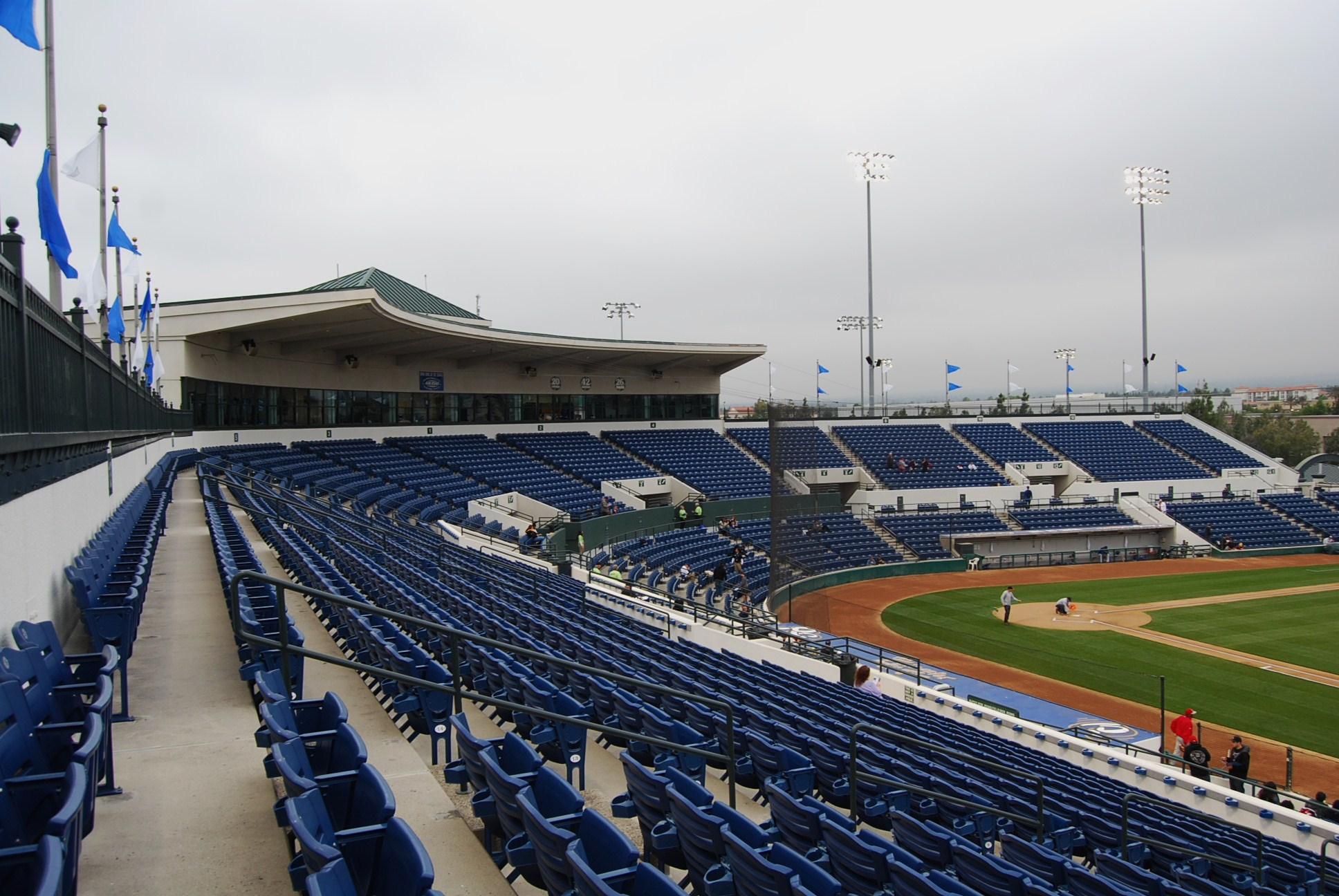
Morongo Field (Rancho Cucamonga Quakes)

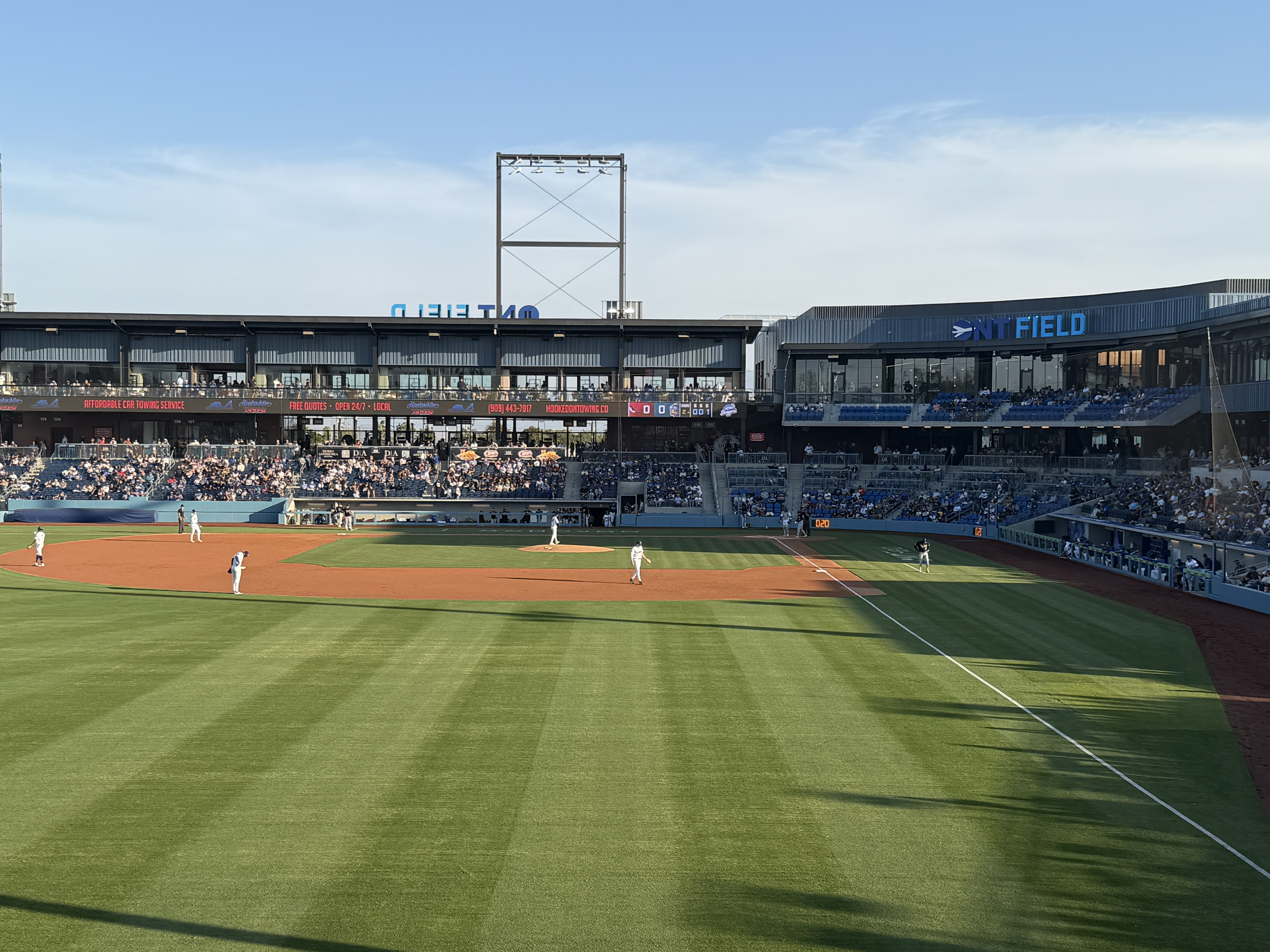
ONT Field (Ontario Tower Buzzers)

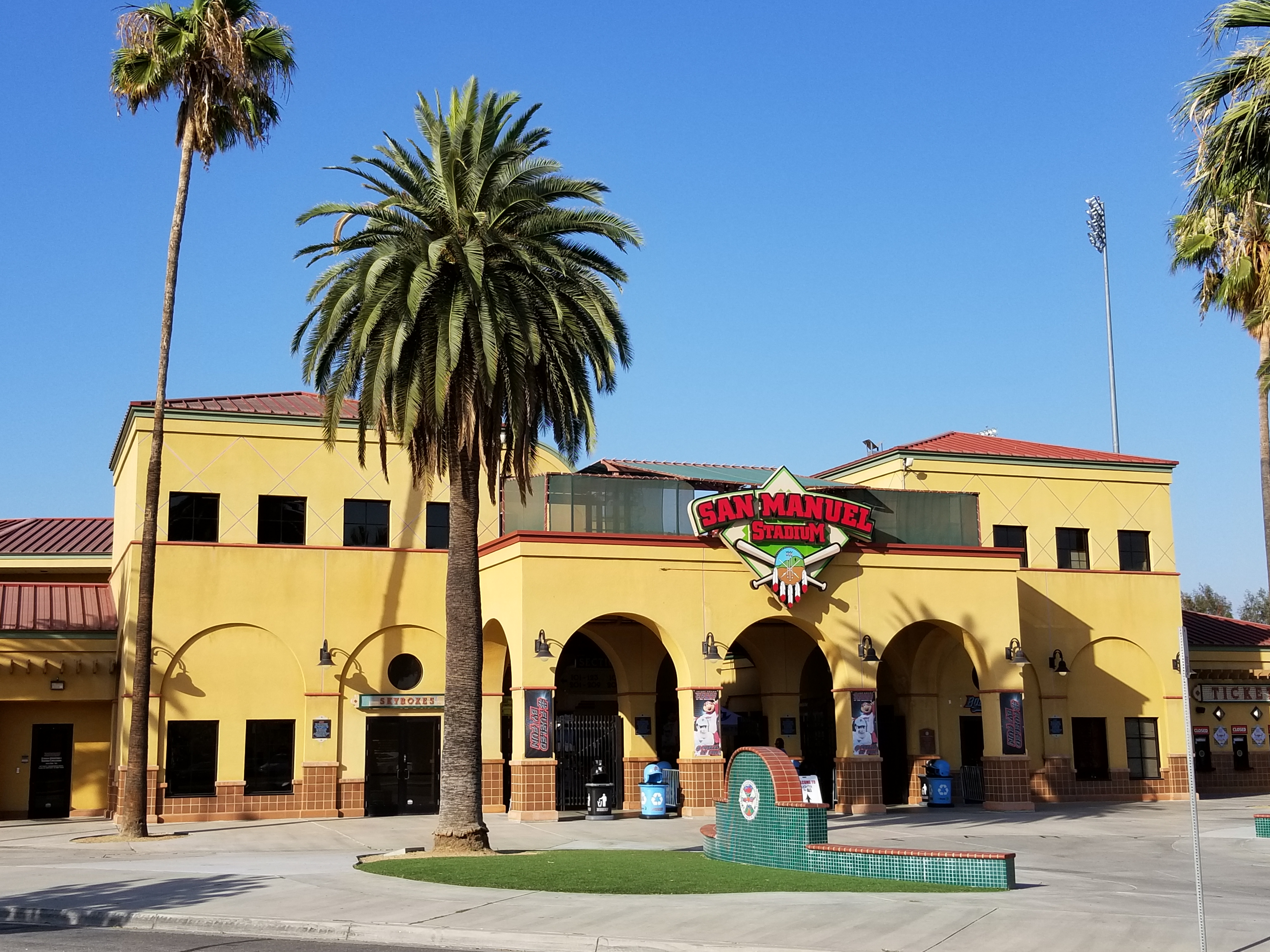
San Manuel Stadium (Inland Empire 66ers)

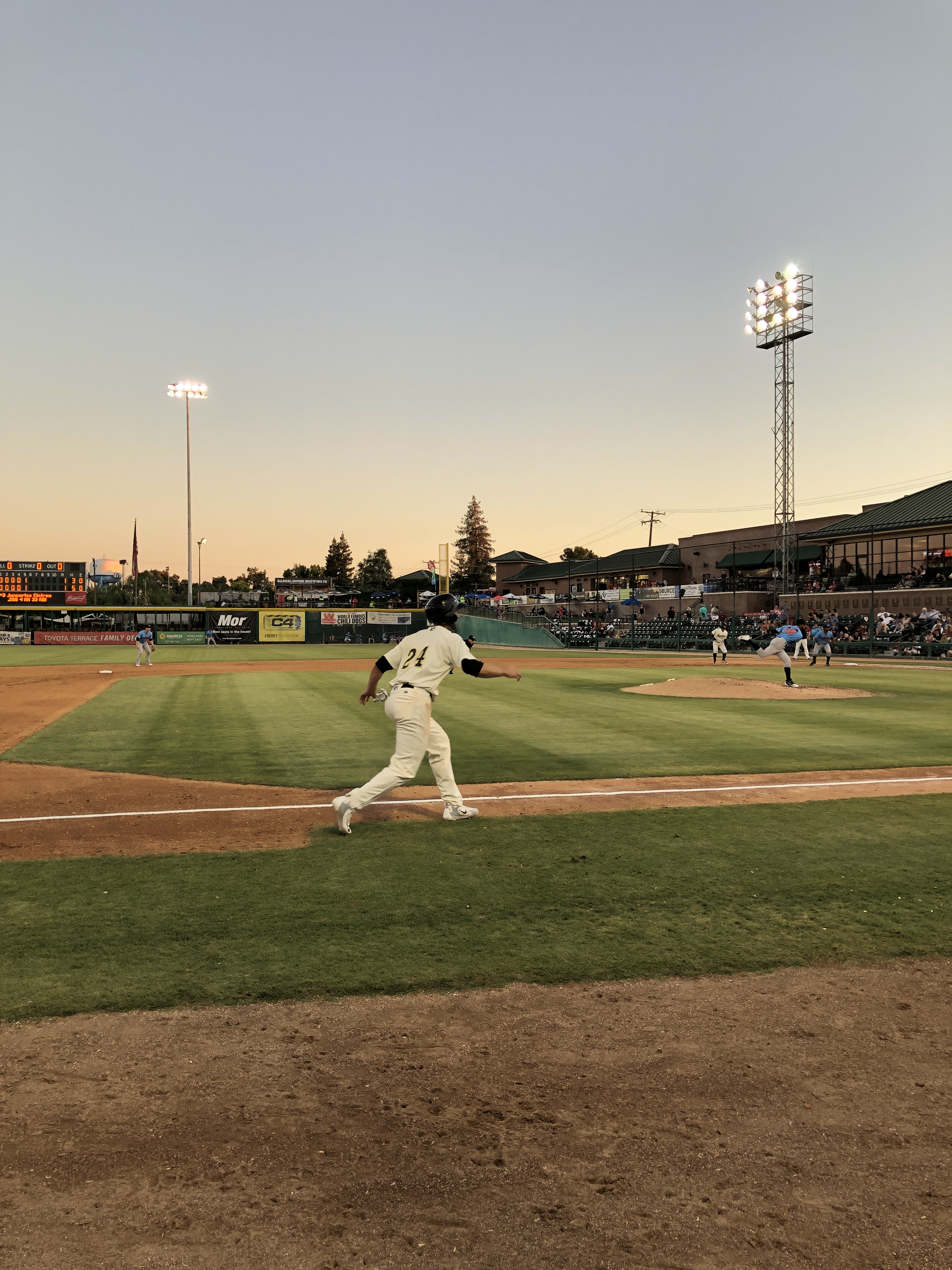
Valley Strong Ballpark (Visalia Rawhide)

== All stadiums ==
Key
| Name | Stadium's name in its last season of hosting CL baseball |
| Opened | Opening of earliest stadium variant used for hosting CL baseball |
| Capacity | Stadium's most recent capacity while hosting CL baseball |

| Name | Team(s) | Locality | State | Opened | Capacity | Ref(s) |
|---|---|---|---|---|---|---|
| La Palma Park (Note: La Palma Park was also known as Glover Stadium.) | Anaheim Aces | Anaheim | California | 1939 | 3,500 | |
| Sam Lynn Ballpark | Bakersfield Badgers/Indians/Boosters/Bears/Dodgers/Outlaws/Mariners/Blaze | Bakersfield | California | 1941 | 3,300 | |
| Valley Strong Ballpark (Note: Valley Strong Ballpark was originally called Recreation Park.) | Central Valley Rockies, Visalia Cubs/Stars/Redlegs/Athletics/White Sox/Mets/Oaks/Rawhide | Visalia | California | 1946 | 2,468 | |
| Moana Stadium | Reno Silver Sox/Padres (Note: The Reno Silver Sox started the 1955 season as the Channel Cities Oilers and moved from Santa Barbara/Ventura, California, on July 1.) | Reno | Nevada | | 4,000 | |
| John Euless Park (Note: John Euless Park was known as Cardinal Park (1942) and Fresno State College Park (1950–1951).) | Fresno Cardinals/Sun Sox/Giants/Suns | Fresno | California | | 2,600 | |
| Chukchansi Park (Note: Chukchansi Park was known as Grizzlies Stadium (2002).) | Fresno Grizzlies | Fresno | California | 2002 | 10,650 | |
| Adelanto Stadium (Note: Adelanto Stadium was known as Maverick (Park) Stadium (1991–2006) and Stater Brothers Stadium.) | High Desert Mavericks | Adelanto | California | 1991 | 3,808 | |
| San Manuel Stadium (Note: San Manuel Stadium was previously known as Arrowhead Credit Union Park and is informally known as The Ranch.) | San Bernardino Stampede, Inland Empire 66ers | San Bernardino | California | 1996 | 8,000 | |
| Fiscalini Field (Note: Fiscalini Field was known as Perris Hill Park (1941–1950).) | San Bernardino Stars, San Bernardino Spirit | San Bernardino | California | 1934 | 3,600 | |
| Lake Elsinore Diamond | Lake Elsinore Storm | Lake Elsinore | California | 1994 | 7,866 | |
| The Hangar (Note: The Hangar was also known as Lancaster Municipal Stadium and Clear Channel Stadium.) | Lancaster JetHawks | Lancaster | California | 1996 | 7,000 | |
| Lawrence Park | Lodi Crushers/Padres/Orions/Lions/Orioles/Dodgers | Lodi | California | | 2,000 | |
| Fairgrounds Field Park | Merced Bears | Merced | California | | 4,000 | |
| Del Webb Field (Note: Del Webb Field was also known as Modesto Municipal Baseball Park and Roosevelt Field.) | Modesto Reds/Colt .45s/Colts/A's | Modesto | California | 1949 | 3,500 | |
| John Thurman Field | Modesto A's/Nuts | Modesto | California | 1952 | 4,000 | |
| Billy Hebert Field (Note: Billy Hebert Field was known as Goodwater Grove (1890–1910), Oak Park (1901–1915), and New Oak Park (1941–1949).) | Stockton Fliers/Ports/Mudville Nine, Stockton Mariners, Mudville Nine | Stockton | California | | 3,760 | |
| Banner Island Ballpark | Stockton Ports | Stockton | California | 2005 | 5,300 | |
| ONT Field | Ontario Tower Buzzers | Ontario | California | 2026 | 6,500 | |
| Laguna Ball Park | Santa Barbara Saints/Dodgers/Rancheros | Santa Barbara | California | | 2,500 | |
| Angels Stadium (Note: Angels Stadium was known as Suns Stadium (1995–1996).) | Palm Springs Angels | Palm Springs | California | 1950 | 5,185 | |
| Morongo Field (Note: Morongo Field was also known as Rancho Cucamonga Sports Complex (1993–1995), The Epicenter, and LoanMart Field.) | Rancho Cucamonga Quakes | Rancho Cucamonga | California | 1993 | 6,200 | |
| Costco Rohnert Park | Redwood Pioneers | Rohnert Park | California | 1981 | 3,500 | |
| Evans Park | Riverside Reds | Riverside | California | | 2,800 | |
| City Sports Center | Riverside Red Wave, Riverside Pilots | Riverside | California | | 3,500 | |
| Salinas Municipal Stadium | Salinas Packers/Mets/Indians/Angels/Spurs | Salinas | California | | 3,000 | |
| Washington Park | Santa Clara Padres | Santa Clara | California | | | |
| Babe Ruth Field (Note: Babe Ruth Field was known as Seaside Park (1947).) | Ventura Yankees/Braves/Oilers | Ventura | California | | 3,000 | |
| Ventura CC Baseball Field | Ventura County Gulls | Ventura | California | | 1,400 | |
| Excite Ballpark (Note: Excite Ballpark was previously known as San Jose Municipal Stadium.) | San Jose Owls/Red Sox/JoSox/Pirates, (Note: The San Jose Pirates moved to Las Vegas, Nevada, on May 26, 1958, and became the Las Vegas Wranglers.) San Jose Bees/Expos/Giants, San Jose Missions, Santa Clara Padres | San Jose | California | 1942 | 4,200 | |
| Elks Stadium (Note: Elks Stadium is also known as Old Cashman Field.) | Las Vegas Wranglers (Note: The Las Vegas Wranglers started the 1958 season as the San Jose Pirates and moved from San Jose, California, on May 26.) | Las Vegas | Nevada | | 8,000 | |

=== Map ===
California League stadium locations

== See also ==
- List of Single-A baseball stadiums
- List of Carolina League stadiums
- List of Florida State League stadiums
