= 1954 California League season =

- League: California League
- Sport: Baseball
- Duration: April 23 – September 12
- Games: 140
- Teams: 8

Regular season
- League champions: Modesto Reds
- Season MVP: Bob Thorpe, Stockton Ports

Playoffs
- League champions: Modesto Reds
- Runners-up: San Jose Red Sox

CALL seasons
- ← 1953 1955 →

The 1954 California League was a Class C baseball season played between April 23 and September 12. Eight teams played a 140-game schedule, as the top four teams qualified for the playoffs.

The Modesto Reds won the California League championship, defeating the San Jose Red Sox in the final round of the playoffs.

== Team changes ==
- The Santa Barbara Dodgers and Ventura Oilers combined into one team. The team was named the Channel Cities Oilers.
- The Salinas Packers join the league as an expansion team.
- The Bakersfield Indians ended their affiliation with the Detroit Tigers and began a new affiliation with the Brooklyn Dodgers.
- The Modesto Reds ended their affiliation with the Milwaukee Braves and began a new affiliation with the New York Yankees.
- The Visalia Stars are renamed to the Visalia Cubs.

== Teams ==
1954 California League
Team	City	MLB Affiliate	Stadium
Bakersfield Indians	Bakersfield, California	Brooklyn Dodgers	Sam Lynn Ballpark
Channel Cities Oilers	Santa Barbara, California; Ventura, California	None	Laguna Park; Babe Ruth Field
Fresno Cardinals	Fresno, California	St. Louis Cardinals	Fresno State College Park
Modesto Reds	Modesto, California	New York Yankees	Modesto Field
Salinas Packers	Salinas, California	None	Salinas Municipal Stadium
San Jose Red Sox	San Jose, California	Boston Red Sox	San Jose Municipal Stadium
Stockton Ports	Stockton, California	Chicago Cubs	Billy Hebert Field
Visalia Cubs	Visalia, California	None	Recreation Ballpark

== Map of teams ==
California League Teams

== Regular season ==
=== Summary ===
- The Modesto Reds finished with the best record in the regular season for the first time since in team history.

=== Standings ===
California League
Team	Win	Loss	%	GB
Modesto Reds	88	52	.629	–
Bakersfield Indians	80	60	.571	8
Stockton Ports	80	60	.571	8
San Jose Red Sox	78	62	.557	10
Fresno Cardinals	73	67	.521	15
Channel Cities Oilers	68	72	.486	20
Salinas Packers	56	84	.400	32
Visalia Cubs	37	103	.264	26

== League Leaders ==
=== Batting leaders ===
Stat	Player	Total
AVG	Joseph Brunacki, Fresno Cardinals	.344
H	Bobby Smith, Fresno Cardinals	179
R	Ray Perry, Bakersfield Indians	142
2B	Billy Kerr, Modesto Reds; John Smith, San Jose Red Sox	34
3B	Bobby Smith, Fresno Cardinals	22
HR	Ray Perry, Bakersfield Indians	37
RBI	Billy Kerr, Modesto Reds; Ray Perry, Bakersfield Indians	128
SB	Nino Spatafore, San Jose Red Sox	31

=== Pitching leaders ===
Stat	Player	Total
W	Bob Thorpe, Stockton Ports	28
ERA	Bob Thorpe, Stockton Ports	2.28
CG	Bob Thorpe, Stockton Ports	32
SHO	Bob Thorpe, Stockton Ports	5
IP	Bob Thorpe, Stockton Ports	300.0
SO	Rick Botelho, Modesto Reds	234

== Playoffs ==
- The Modesto Reds won their second California League championship, defeating the San Jose Red Sox in five games.

=== Playoff bracket ===
Semi-finals
1	Modesto	3
3	Stockton	0
2	Bakersfield	0
4	San Jose	3

Finals
1	Modesto	4
4	San Jose	1

== Awards ==
California League awards
Award name	Recipient
Most Valuable Player	Bob Thorpe, Stockton Ports

== See also ==
- 1954 Major League Baseball season
