= 1950 California League season =

- League: California League
- Sport: Baseball
- Duration: April 21 – September 4
- Games: 140
- Teams: 8

Regular season
- League champions: Ventura Braves
- Season MVP: Dick Wilson, Modesto Reds

Playoffs
- League champions: Modesto Reds
- Runners-up: San Jose Red Sox

CALL seasons
- ← 1949 1951 →

The 1950 California League was a Class C baseball season played between April 21 and September 4. Eight teams played a 140-game schedule, as the top four teams qualified for the playoffs.

The Modesto Reds won the California League championship, defeating the San Jose Red Sox in the final round of the playoffs.

== Team changes ==
- The Ventura Yankees ended their affiliation with the New York Yankees and began a new affiliation with the Boston Braves. The club was renamed to the Ventura Braves.
- The Stockton Ports ended their affiliation with the Chicago White Sox.

== Teams ==
1950 California League
Team	City	MLB Affiliate	Stadium
Bakersfield Indians	Bakersfield, California	Cleveland Indians	Sam Lynn Ballpark
Fresno Cardinals	Fresno, California	St. Louis Cardinals	Fresno State College Park
Modesto Reds	Modesto, California	Pittsburgh Pirates	Modesto Field
San Jose Red Sox	San Jose, California	Boston Red Sox	San Jose Municipal Stadium
Santa Barbara Dodgers	Santa Barbara, California	Brooklyn Dodgers	Laguna Park
Stockton Ports	Stockton, California	None	Oak Park Field
Ventura Braves	Ventura, California	Boston Braves	Babe Ruth Field
Visalia Cubs	Visalia, California	Chicago Cubs	Recreation Ballpark

== Map of teams ==
California League Teams

== Regular season ==
=== Summary ===
- The Ventura Braves finished with the best record in the regular season for the first time in team history.

=== Standings ===
California League
Team	Win	Loss	%	GB
Ventura Braves	85	55	.607	–
Modesto Reds	82	58	.586	3
Stockton Ports	79	61	.564	6
San Jose Red Sox	78	62	.557	7
Visalia Cubs	65	75	.464	20
Bakersfield Indians	61	79	.436	24
Fresno Cardinals	58	82	.414	27
Santa Barbara Dodgers	52	88	.371	33

== League Leaders ==
=== Batting leaders ===
Stat	Player	Total
AVG	Jim Acton, Visalia Cubs	.355
H	Earl Smith, Modesto Reds	167
R	Jess Pike, Modesto Reds	122
2B	Dick Adams, Stockton Ports	38
3B	Pablo Bernard, Ventura Braves	14
HR	Dick Wilson, Modesto Reds	30
RBI	Dick Wilson, Modesto Reds	154
SB	Earl Smith, Modesto Reds	47

=== Pitching leaders ===
Stat	Player	Total
W	Bud Guldborg, Stockton Ports	22
ERA	Tony Freitas, Modesto Reds	2.56
CG	Earl Escalante, Bakersfield Indians	22
SHO	Bud Guldborg, Stockton Ports	5
IP	Earl Escalante, Bakersfield Indians	279.0
SO	Gordon Jones, Fresno Cardinals	200

== Playoffs ==
- The playoff semi-finals format is changed from 1 vs. 3 and 2 vs. 4 to 1 vs. 4 and 2 vs. 3.
- The Modesto Reds won their first California League championship, defeating the San Jose Red Sox in five games.

=== Playoff bracket ===
Semi-finals
1	Ventura	2
4	San Jose	3
2	Modesto	3
3	Stockton	1

Finals
4	San Jose	1
2	Modesto	4

== Awards ==
California League awards
Award name	Recipient
Most Valuable Player	Dick Wilson, Modesto Reds

== See also ==
- 1950 Major League Baseball season
