= 1951 California League season =

- League: California League
- Sport: Baseball
- Duration: April 20 – September 9
- Games: 148
- Teams: 8

Regular season
- League champions: Santa Barbara Dodgers

Playoffs
- League champions: Santa Barbara Dodgers
- Runners-up: Visalia Cubs

CALL seasons
- ← 1950 1952 →

The 1951 California League was a Class C baseball season played between April 20 and September 9. Eight teams played a 148-game schedule, as the top four teams qualified for the playoffs.

The Santa Barbara Dodgers won the California League championship, defeating the Visalia Cubs in the final round of the playoffs.

== Teams ==
1951 California League
Team	City	MLB Affiliate	Stadium
Bakersfield Indians	Bakersfield, California	Cleveland Indians	Sam Lynn Ballpark
Fresno Cardinals	Fresno, California	St. Louis Cardinals	Fresno State College Park
Modesto Reds	Modesto, California	Pittsburgh Pirates	Modesto Field
San Jose Red Sox	San Jose, California	Boston Red Sox	San Jose Municipal Stadium
Santa Barbara Dodgers	Santa Barbara, California	Brooklyn Dodgers	Laguna Park
Stockton Ports	Stockton, California	None	Oak Park Field
Ventura Braves	Ventura, California	Boston Braves	Babe Ruth Field
Visalia Cubs	Visalia, California	Chicago Cubs	Recreation Ballpark

== Map of teams ==
California League Teams

== Regular season ==
=== Summary ===
- The Santa Barbara Dodgers finished with the best record in the regular season for the first time since 1942.

=== Standings ===
California League
Team	Win	Loss	%	GB
Santa Barbara Dodgers	88	59	.599	–
San Jose Red Sox	80	67	.544	8
Stockton Ports	79	68	.537	9
Visalia Cubs	76	71	.517	12
Modesto Reds	74	73	.503	14
Ventura Braves	72	75	.490	16
Fresno Cardinals	61	86	.415	27
Bakersfield Indians	58	89	.395	30

== League Leaders ==
=== Batting leaders ===
Stat	Player	Total
AVG	Dick Wilson, Modesto Reds	.371
H	Dick Wilson, Modesto Reds	205
R	Jim Warner, Modesto Reds	145
2B	Dick Wilson, Modesto Reds	55
3B	Lee Walls, Modesto Reds	16
HR	Dick Wilson, Modesto Reds	40
RBI	Gabe Gabler, Santa Barbara Dodgers	153
SB	Alfred Facchini, Ventura Braves	54

=== Pitching leaders ===
Stat	Player	Total
W	Tony Freitas, Modesto Reds	25
ERA	Stan McWilliams, San Jose Red Sox	2.55
CG	Tony Freitas, Modesto Reds	28
SHO	Frank Aguilar, Ventura Braves; Frank Dasso, Modesto Reds; Stan McWilliams, San Jose Red Sox	4
IP	Earl Escalante, Stockton Ports	286.0
SO	Frank Dasso, Modesto Reds	210

== Playoffs ==
- The playoff semi-finals format is changed from 1 vs. 4 and 2 vs. 3 to 1 vs. 3 and 2 vs. 4.
- The Santa Barbara Dodgers won their third California League championship, defeating the Visalia Cubs in five games.

=== Playoff bracket ===
Semi-finals
1	Santa Barbara	3
3	Stockton	1
2	San Jose	1
4	Visalia	3

Finals
1	Santa Barbara	4
4	Visalia	1

== See also ==
- 1951 Major League Baseball season
