= 1955 California League season =

- League: California League
- Sport: Baseball
- Duration: April 15 – September 5
- Games: 148
- Teams: 8

Regular season
- League champions: Fresno Cardinals
- Season MVP: Pumpsie Green, Stockton Ports

Playoffs
- League champions: Fresno Cardinals
- Runners-up: Stockton Ports

CALL seasons
- ← 1954 1956 →

The 1955 California League was a Class C baseball season played between April 15 and September 5. Eight teams played a 148-game schedule, as the winner of each half of the season qualified for the California League championship round.

The Fresno Cardinals won the California League championship, defeating the Stockton Ports in the final round of the playoffs.

== Team changes ==
- The Salinas Packers began an affiliation with the Pittsburgh Pirates.
- The Stockton Ports ended their affiliation with the Chicago Cubs.

== Teams ==
1955 California League
Team	City	MLB Affiliate	Stadium
Bakersfield Indians	Bakersfield, California	Brooklyn Dodgers	Sam Lynn Ballpark
Channel Cities Oilers; Reno Silver Sox	Santa Barbara, California; Ventura, California; Reno, Nevada	None	Laguna Park; Babe Ruth Field; Moana Stadium
Fresno Cardinals	Fresno, California	St. Louis Cardinals	Fresno State College Park
Modesto Reds	Modesto, California	New York Yankees	Del Webb Field
Salinas Packers	Salinas, California	Pittsburgh Pirates	Salinas Municipal Stadium
San Jose Red Sox	San Jose, California	Boston Red Sox	San Jose Municipal Stadium
Stockton Ports	Stockton, California	None	Billy Hebert Field
Visalia Cubs	Visalia, California	None	Recreation Ballpark

== Map of teams ==
California League Teams

== Regular season ==
=== Summary ===
- The Fresno Cardinals finished with the best record in the regular season for the first time since 1952. The Cardinals set a league record with 104 victories.
- On July 1, the Channel Cities Oilers relocated to Reno, Nevada and were renamed the Reno Silver Sox.

=== Standings ===
California League
Team	Win	Loss	%	GB
Fresno Cardinals	104	43	.707	–
San Jose Red Sox	98	48	.671	5.5
Stockton Ports	94	53	.639	10
Modesto Reds	76	71	.517	28
Bakersfield Indians	61	85	.418	42.5
Salinas Packers	60	86	.411	43.5
Visalia Cubs	53	94	.361	51
Channel Cities Oilers / Reno Silver Sox	40	106	.274	63.5

== League Leaders ==
=== Batting leaders ===
Stat	Player	Total
AVG	Bobby Smith, Fresno Cardinals	.370
H	Benny Valenzuela, Fresno Cardinals	209
R	Mel Nelson, Fresno Cardinals; Benny Valenzuela, Fresno Cardinals	151
2B	Jerry Crosby, Modesto Reds	44
3B	Benny Valenzuela, Fresno Cardinals	19
HR	Russ Rosburg, Modesto Reds	33
RBI	Bobby Smith, Fresno Cardinals	141
SB	Howie Goss, Salinas Packers	33

=== Pitching leaders ===
Stat	Player	Total
W	Glen Stabelfeld, Fresno Cardinals	24
ERA	Charlie Beamon, Fresno Cardinals	1.36
CG	Ernie Broglio, Stockton Ports	25
SHO	Tom Hughes, Fresno Cardinals; Jack Osborn, San Jose Red Sox; Stan Willis, San Jose Red Sox	5
IP	Ernie Broglio, Stockton Ports	252.0
SO	Tom Hughes, Fresno Cardinals	273

== Playoffs ==
- The playoffs were shortened to only the final round.
- The championship series was shortened to a best-of-five series.
- The winners of each half of the season qualified for the post-season.
- The Fresno Cardinals won their second California League championship, defeating the Stockton Ports in four games.

=== Playoff bracket ===
Finals
1	Stockton	1
2	Fresno	3

== Awards ==
California League awards
Award name	Recipient
Most Valuable Player	Pumpsie Green, Stockton Ports

== See also ==
- 1955 Major League Baseball season
