= 1949 California League season =

- League: California League
- Sport: Baseball
- Duration: April 22 – September 5
- Games: 140
- Teams: 8

Regular season
- League champions: Bakersfield Indians
- Season MVP: Earl Escalante, Bakersfield Indians

Playoffs
- League champions: San Jose Red Sox
- Runners-up: Ventura Yankees

CALL seasons
- ← 1948 1950 →

The 1949 California League was a Class C baseball season played between April 22 and September 5. Eight teams played a 140-game schedule, as the top four teams qualified for the playoffs.

The San Jose Red Sox won the California League championship, defeating the Ventura Yankees in the final round of the playoffs.

== Team changes ==
- The Modesto Reds ended their affiliation with the St. Louis Browns and began a new affiliation with the Pittsburgh Pirates.
- The Stockton Ports began an affiliation with the Chicago White Sox.

== Teams ==
1949 California League
Team	City	MLB Affiliate	Stadium
Bakersfield Indians	Bakersfield, California	Cleveland Indians	Sam Lynn Ballpark
Fresno Cardinals	Fresno, California	St. Louis Cardinals	Fresno State College Park
Modesto Reds	Modesto, California	Pittsburgh Pirates	Modesto Field
San Jose Red Sox	San Jose, California	Boston Red Sox	San Jose Municipal Stadium
Santa Barbara Dodgers	Santa Barbara, California	Brooklyn Dodgers	Laguna Park
Stockton Ports	Stockton, California	Chicago White Sox	Oak Park Field
Ventura Yankees	Ventura, California	New York Yankees	Babe Ruth Field
Visalia Cubs	Visalia, California	Chicago Cubs	Recreation Ballpark

== Map of teams ==
California League Teams

== Regular season ==
=== Summary ===
- The Bakersfield Indians finished with the best record in the regular season for the first time in team history.

=== Standings ===
California League
Team	Win	Loss	%	GB
Bakersfield Indians	85	54	.612	–
Fresno Cardinals	83	57	.593	2.5
Ventura Yankees	80	60	.571	5.5
San Jose Red Sox	76	64	.543	9.5
Santa Barbara Dodgers	75	65	.536	10.5
Stockton Ports	64	76	.457	21.5
Modesto Reds	54	85	.388	31
Visalia Cubs	42	98	.300	43.5

== League Leaders ==
=== Batting leaders ===
Stat	Player	Total
AVG	Max Macon, Modesto Reds	.383
H	Wimpy Quinn, Bakersfield Indians	196
R	Jess Pike, Bakersfield Indians	167
2B	Wimpy Quinn, Bakersfield Indians	39
3B	Harry Clements, Stockton Ports; Vincent Moreci, Fresno Cardinals	11
HR	Jess Pike, Bakersfield Indians	37
RBI	Jess Pike, Bakersfield Indians	156
SB	Milt Joffe, Santa Barbara Dodgers	47

=== Pitching leaders ===
Stat	Player	Total
W	Earl Escalante, Bakersfield Indians	28
ERA	Drex Waters, Santa Barbara Dodgers	2.54
CG	Earl Escalante, Bakersfield Indians	29
SHO	Fred Hahn, Fresno Cardinals; Chet Kehn, Santa Barbara Dodgers	4
IP	Earl Escalante, Bakersfield Indians	300.0
SO	Armand Castro, Modesto Reds	237

== Playoffs ==
- The San Jose Red Sox won their first California League championship, defeating the Ventura Yankees in five games.

=== Playoff bracket ===
Semi-finals
1	Bakersfield	2
3	Ventura	3
2	Fresno	0
4	San Jose	3

Finals
3	Ventura	1
4	San Jose	4

== Awards ==
California League awards
Award name	Recipient
Most Valuable Player	Earl Escalante, Bakersfield Indians

== See also ==
- 1949 Major League Baseball season
