= 1952 California League season =

- League: California League
- Sport: Baseball
- Duration: April 18 – September 7
- Games: 140
- Teams: 8

Regular season
- League champions: Fresno Cardinals
- Season MVP: Larry Jackson, Fresno Cardinals

Playoffs
- League champions: Fresno Cardinals
- Runners-up: San Jose Red Sox

CALL seasons
- ← 1951 1953 →

The 1952 California League was a Class C baseball season played between April 18 and September 7. Eight teams played a 140-game schedule, as the top four teams qualified for the playoffs.

The Fresno Cardinals won the California League championship, defeating the San Jose Red Sox in the final round of the playoffs.

== Team changes ==
- The Stockton Ports began an affiliation with the St. Louis Browns.

== Teams ==
1952 California League
Team	City	MLB Affiliate	Stadium
Bakersfield Indians	Bakersfield, California	Cleveland Indians	Sam Lynn Ballpark
Fresno Cardinals	Fresno, California	St. Louis Cardinals	Fresno State College Park
Modesto Reds	Modesto, California	Pittsburgh Pirates	Modesto Field
San Jose Red Sox	San Jose, California	Boston Red Sox	San Jose Municipal Stadium
Santa Barbara Dodgers	Santa Barbara, California	Brooklyn Dodgers	Laguna Park
Stockton Ports	Stockton, California	St. Louis Browns	Oak Park Field
Ventura Braves	Ventura, California	Boston Braves	Babe Ruth Field
Visalia Cubs	Visalia, California	Chicago Cubs	Recreation Ballpark

== Map of teams ==
California League Teams

== Regular season ==
=== Summary ===
- The Fresno Cardinals finished with the best record in the regular season for the first time since 1948.

=== Standings ===
California League
Team	Win	Loss	%	GB
Fresno Cardinals	88	52	.629	–
San Jose Red Sox	74	66	.529	14
Santa Barbara Dodgers	74	66	.529	14
Visalia Cubs	72	68	.514	16
Bakersfield Indians	70	70	.500	18
Modesto Reds	67	73	.479	21
Stockton Ports	59	81	.421	29
Ventura Braves	56	84	.400	32

== League Leaders ==
=== Batting leaders ===
Stat	Player	Total
AVG	Al Grandcolas, Fresno Cardinals	.347
H	Al Grandcolas, Fresno Cardinals	191
R	Dave Cunningham, Visalia Cubs	132
2B	Nap Gulley, Visalia Cubs	43
3B	William Burton, Fresno Cardinals	11
HR	Benjamin Downs, Fresno Cardinals	34
RBI	Benjamin Downs, Fresno Cardinals	154
SB	Dave Mann, Stockton Ports	59

=== Pitching leaders ===
Stat	Player	Total
W	Larry Jackson, Fresno Cardinals	28
ERA	Jake Abbott, Santa Barbara Dodgers	2.19
CG	Larry Jackson, Fresno Cardinals	30
SHO	Tony Freitas, Stockton Ports	7
IP	Larry Jackson, Fresno Cardinals	300.0
SO	Larry Jackson, Fresno Cardinals	351

== Playoffs ==
- The Fresno Cardinals won their first California League championship, defeating the San Jose Red Sox in six games.

=== Playoff bracket ===
Semi-finals
1	Fresno	3
3	Santa Barbara	0
2	San Jose	3
4	Visalia	1

Finals
1	Fresno	4
2	San Jose	2

== Awards ==
California League awards
Award name	Recipient
Most Valuable Player	Larry Jackson, Fresno Cardinals

== See also ==
- 1952 Major League Baseball season
