= 1953 California League season =

- League: California League
- Sport: Baseball
- Duration: April 17 – September 7
- Games: 140
- Teams: 8

Regular season
- League champions: San Jose Red Sox
- Season MVP: Tex Clevenger, San Jose Red Sox

Playoffs
- League champions: San Jose Red Sox
- Runners-up: Stockton Ports

CALL seasons
- ← 1952 1954 →

The 1953 California League was a Class C baseball season played between April 17 and September 7. Eight teams played a 140-game schedule, as the top four teams qualified for the playoffs.

The San Jose Red Sox won the California League championship, defeating the Stockton Ports in the final round of the playoffs.

== Team changes ==
- The Bakersfield Indians ended their affiliation with the Cleveland Indians and began a new affiliation with the Detroit Tigers.
- The Modesto Reds ended their affiliation with the Pittsburgh Pirates and began a new affiliation with the Milwaukee Braves.
- The Stockton Ports ended their affiliation with the St. Louis Browns and began a new affiliation with the Chicago Cubs.
- The Ventura Braves ended their affiliation with the Boston Braves. The club was renamed to the Ventura Oilers.
- The Visalia Cubs ended their affiliation with the Chicago Cubs. The club was renamed to the Visalia Stars.

== Teams ==
1953 California League
Team	City	MLB Affiliate	Stadium
Bakersfield Indians	Bakersfield, California	Detroit Tigers	Sam Lynn Ballpark
Fresno Cardinals	Fresno, California	St. Louis Cardinals	Fresno State College Park
Modesto Reds	Modesto, California	Milwaukee Braves	Modesto Field
San Jose Red Sox	San Jose, California	Boston Red Sox	San Jose Municipal Stadium
Santa Barbara Dodgers	Santa Barbara, California	Brooklyn Dodgers	Laguna Park
Stockton Ports	Stockton, California	Chicago Cubs	Billy Hebert Field
Ventura Oilers	Ventura, California	None	Babe Ruth Field
Visalia Stars	Visalia, California	None	Recreation Ballpark

== Map of teams ==
California League Teams

== Regular season ==
=== Summary ===
- The San Jose Red Sox finished with the best record in the regular season for the first time since in team history.

=== Standings ===
California League
Team	Win	Loss	%	GB
San Jose Red Sox	93	47	.664	–
Bakersfield Indians	75	65	.536	18
Santa Barbara Dodgers	74	66	.529	19
Stockton Ports	72	68	.514	21
Visalia Stars	67	73	.479	26
Fresno Cardinals	64	77	.454	29.5
Modesto Reds	64	77	.454	29.5
Ventura Oilers	52	88	.371	41

== League Leaders ==
=== Batting leaders ===
Stat	Player	Total
AVG	José Pérez, Ventura Oilers	.373
H	Jim O'Brien, Stockton Ports	181
R	Ray Perry, Bakersfield Indians	120
2B	Bill Garbe, Bakersfield Indians; Ray Perry, Bakersfield Indians	41
3B	Jay Roundy, Visalia Stars	12
HR	Ray Perry, Bakersfield Indians	36
RBI	Edward Sobczak, San Jose Red Sox	142
SB	Marty Keough, San Jose Red Sox; Donald Lopes, Bakersfield Indians	28

=== Pitching leaders ===
Stat	Player	Total
W	Tony Freitas, Stockton Ports	22
ERA	Tex Clevenger, San Jose Red Sox	1.51
CG	Tony Freitas, Stockton Ports	28
SHO	Art Demery, Bakersfield Indians; Guy Fletcher, Modesto Reds; Tony Freitas, Stockton Ports; Clair Parkin, San Jose Red Sox; Solon Shaw, Visalia Stars; Bud Watkins, Stockton Ports	3
IP	Tony Freitas, Stockton Ports; Tony Ponce, Ventura Oilers	279.0
SO	Clair Parkin, San Jose Red Sox	192

== Playoffs ==
- The San Jose Red Sox won their second California League championship, defeating the Stockton Ports in six games.

=== Playoff bracket ===
Semi-finals
1	San Jose	3
3	Santa Barbara	0
2	Bakersfield	0
4	Stockton	3

Finals
1	San Jose	4
4	Stockton	2

== Awards ==
California League awards
Award name	Recipient
Most Valuable Player	Tex Clevenger, San Jose Red Sox

== See also ==
- 1953 Major League Baseball season
