= 1947 California League season =

- League: California League
- Sport: Baseball
- Duration: April 25 – September 7
- Games: 140
- Teams: 8

Regular season
- League champions: Stockton Ports
- Season MVP: Ed Samcoff, Stockton Ports

Playoffs
- League champions: Stockton Ports
- Runners-up: Santa Barbara Dodgers

CALL seasons
- ← 1946 1948 →

The 1947 California League was a Class C baseball season played between April 25 and September 7. Eight teams played a 140-game schedule, as the top four teams qualified for the playoffs.

The Stockton Ports won the California League championship, defeating the Santa Barbara Dodgers in the final round of the playoffs.

== Team changes ==
- The San Jose Red Sox join the league as an expansion team. The club began an affiliation with the Boston Red Sox.
- The Ventura Yankees join the league as an expansion team. The club began an affiliation with the New York Yankees.

== Teams ==
1947 California League
Team	City	MLB Affiliate	Stadium
Bakersfield Indians	Bakersfield, California	Cleveland Indians	Sam Lynn Ballpark
Fresno Cardinals	Fresno, California	St. Louis Cardinals	Fresno State College Park
Modesto Reds	Modesto, California	None	Modesto Field
San Jose Red Sox	San Jose, California	Boston Red Sox	San Jose Municipal Stadium
Santa Barbara Dodgers	Santa Barbara, California	Brooklyn Dodgers	Laguna Park
Stockton Ports	Stockton, California	None	Oak Park Field
Ventura Yankees	Ventura, California	New York Yankees	Babe Ruth Field
Visalia Cubs	Visalia, California	Chicago Cubs	Recreation Ballpark

== Map of teams ==
California League Teams

== Regular season ==
=== Summary ===
- The Stockton Ports finished with the best record in the regular season for the second consecutive season.
- The Stockton Ports set a league record with a 26-game winning streak.
- The Visalia Cubs defeated the San Jose Red Sox in a one-game tiebreaker to clinch second place in the league standings.

=== Standings ===
California League
Team	Win	Loss	%	GB
Stockton Ports	95	45	.679	–
Visalia Cubs	79	61	.564	16
San Jose Red Sox	79	61	.564	16
Santa Barbara Dodgers	73	67	.521	22
Bakersfield Indians	66	74	.471	29
Fresno Cardinals	58	82	.414	37
Ventura Yankees	58	82	.414	37
Modesto Reds	52	88	.371	43

== League Leaders ==
=== Batting leaders ===
Stat	Player	Total
AVG	Dick Cole, Fresno Cardinals	.386
H	Ed Lenn, San Jose Red Sox	204
R	Jim Trew, Visalia Cubs	134
2B	Ed Lenn, San Jose Red Sox	46
3B	Bert Bonomi, Fresno Cardinals	20
HR	Willis Enos, Modesto Reds	30
RBI	Lou Vezilich, Fresno Cardinals	141
SB	Frank Bowa, Bakersfield Indians	41

=== Pitching leaders ===
Stat	Player	Total
W	Donald Belton, Stockton Ports	21
ERA	Lloyd Hittle, Stockton Ports	2.24
CG	Elias Castro, Modesto Reds	24
SHO	Eugene Chelli, Stockton Ports	5
IP	John Hoffman, Visalia Cubs	276.0
SO	John Hoffman, Visalia Cubs	263

== Playoffs ==
- The Stockton Ports won their second consecutive California League championship, defeating the Santa Barbara Dodgers in seven games.

=== Playoff bracket ===
Semi-finals
1	Stockton	3
3	San Jose	0
2	Visalia	0
4	Santa Barbara	3

Finals
1	Stockton	4
4	Santa Barbara	3

== Awards ==
California League awards
Award name	Recipient
Most Valuable Player	Ed Samcoff, Stockton Ports

== See also ==
- 1947 Major League Baseball season
