= 1948 California League season =

- League: California League
- Sport: Baseball
- Duration: April 23 – September 6
- Games: 140
- Teams: 8

Regular season
- League champions: Fresno Cardinals

Playoffs
- League champions: Santa Barbara Dodgers
- Runners-up: Stockton Ports

CALL seasons
- ← 1947 1949 →

The 1948 California League was a Class C baseball season played between April 23 and September 6. Eight teams played a 140-game schedule, as the top four teams qualified for the playoffs.

The Santa Barbara Dodgers won the California League championship, defeating the Stockton Ports in the final round of the playoffs.

== Team changes ==
- The Modesto Reds begin an affiliation with the St. Louis Browns.

== Teams ==
1948 California League
Team	City	MLB Affiliate	Stadium
Bakersfield Indians	Bakersfield, California	Cleveland Indians	Sam Lynn Ballpark
Fresno Cardinals	Fresno, California	St. Louis Cardinals	Fresno State College Park
Modesto Reds	Modesto, California	St. Louis Browns	Modesto Field
San Jose Red Sox	San Jose, California	Boston Red Sox	San Jose Municipal Stadium
Santa Barbara Dodgers	Santa Barbara, California	Brooklyn Dodgers	Laguna Park
Stockton Ports	Stockton, California	None	Oak Park Field
Ventura Yankees	Ventura, California	New York Yankees	Babe Ruth Field
Visalia Cubs	Visalia, California	Chicago Cubs	Recreation Ballpark

== Map of teams ==
California League Teams

== Regular season ==
=== Summary ===
- The Fresno Cardinals finished with the best record in the regular season for the first time since 1941.

=== Standings ===
California League
Team	Win	Loss	%	GB
Fresno Cardinals	85	55	.607	–
Ventura Yankees	80	60	.571	5
Santa Barbara Dodgers	74	66	.529	11
Stockton Ports	72	68	.514	13
Bakersfield Indians	70	70	.500	15
Modesto Reds	70	70	.500	15
San Jose Red Sox	64	76	.457	21
Visalia Cubs	45	95	.321	40

== League Leaders ==
=== Batting leaders ===
Stat	Player	Total
AVG	Harold Cox, Bakersfield Indians	.345
H	Harry Clements, Stockton Ports	186
R	Howie Phillips, Fresno Cardinals	126
2B	Harry Clements, Stockton Ports; Rip Repulski, Fresno Cardinals	33
3B	Norm Grabar, Stockton Ports; Bob Moniz, Visalia Cubs	13
HR	Vince DiMaggio, Stockton Ports	30
RBI	Rip Repulski, Fresno Cardinals	125
SB	Frank Murray, Stockton Ports	34

=== Pitching leaders ===
Stat	Player	Total
W	Frances Meagher, Santa Barbara Dodgers	18
ERA	Walter Olsen, Santa Barbara Dodgers	2.16
CG	Walter Olsen, Santa Barbara Dodgers	25
SHO	Fred Fass, Fresno Cardinals; Robert Hoch, Fresno Cardinals; Walter Olsen, Santa Barbara Dodgers	4
IP	Walter Olsen, Santa Barbara Dodgers	238.0
SO	Walter Olsen, Santa Barbara Dodgers	246

== Playoffs ==
- The Santa Barbara Dodgers won their second California League championship, defeating the Stockton Ports in seven games.

=== Playoff bracket ===
Semi-finals
1	Fresno	2
3	Santa Barbara	3
2	Ventura	0
4	Stockton	3

Finals
3	Santa Barbara	4
4	Stockton	3

== See also ==
- 1948 Major League Baseball season
