= 1946 California League season =

- League: California League
- Sport: Baseball
- Duration: May 3 – September 6
- Games: 130
- Teams: 6

Regular season
- League champions: Stockton Ports
- Season MVP: Tommy Glaviano, Fresno Cardinals

Playoffs
- League champions: Stockton Ports
- Runners-up: Modesto Reds

CALL seasons
- ← 1942 1947 →

The 1946 California League was a Class C baseball season played between May 3 and September 6. Six teams played a 130-game schedule, as the top four teams qualified for the playoffs.

The Stockton Ports won the California League championship, defeating the Modesto Reds in the final round of the playoffs.

== Off-season ==
- Following the conclusion of World War II, the league reorganized and came back in 1946.

== Team changes ==
- The San Jose Owls did not return to the league.
- The Modesto Reds join the league as an expansion team.
- The Stockton Ports join the league as an expansion team.
- The Visalia Cubs join the league as an expansion team. The club began an affiliation with the Chicago Cubs.
- The Bakersfield Badgers began an affiliation with the Cleveland Indians. The club was renamed to the Bakersfield Indians.
- The Santa Barbara Saints are renamed to the Santa Barbara Dodgers. The club remained affiliated with the Brooklyn Dodgers.

== Teams ==
1946 California League
Team	City	MLB Affiliate	Stadium
Bakersfield Indians	Bakersfield, California	Cleveland Indians	Sam Lynn Ballpark
Fresno Cardinals	Fresno, California	St. Louis Cardinals	Fresno State College Park
Modesto Reds	Modesto, California	None	Modesto Field
Santa Barbara Dodgers	Santa Barbara, California	Brooklyn Dodgers	Laguna Park
Stockton Ports	Stockton, California	None	Oak Park Field
Visalia Cubs	Visalia, California	Chicago Cubs	Recreation Ballpark

== Map of teams ==
California League Teams

== Regular season ==
=== Summary ===
- The Stockton Ports finished with the best record in the regular season for the first time in club history.

=== Standings ===
California League
Team	Win	Loss	%	GB
Stockton Ports	78	52	.600	–
Santa Barbara Dodgers	74	56	.569	4
Bakersfield Indians	72	58	.554	6
Modesto Reds	69	61	.531	9
Fresno Cardinals	58	72	.446	20
Visalia Cubs	39	91	.300	39

== League Leaders ==
=== Batting leaders ===
Stat	Player	Total
AVG	Alfonso Prieto, Bakersfield Indians	.380
H	Irv Noren, Santa Barbara Dodgers	188
R	Tommy Glaviano, Fresno Cardinals	142
2B	Irv Noren, Santa Barbara Dodgers	33
3B	Irv Noren, Santa Barbara Dodgers	14
HR	Harry Goorabian, Stockton Ports	24
RBI	Irv Noren, Santa Barbara Dodgers	129
SB	Tommy Glaviano, Fresno Cardinals	64

=== Pitching leaders ===
Stat	Player	Total
W	Donald Belton, Stockton Ports	23
ERA	Mike Garcia, Bakersfield Indians	2.56
CG	Mike Garcia, Bakersfield Indians	20
SHO	Joseph DeSanti, Bakersfield Indians	4
IP	Donald Belton, Stockton Ports	246.0
SO	Mike Garcia, Bakersfield Indians	186

== Playoffs ==
- The league semi-finals were a best-of-five series.
- The league finals were a best-of-seven series.
- The Stockton Ports won their first California League championship, defeating the Modesto Reds in four games.

=== Playoff bracket ===
Semi-finals
1	Stockton	3
3	Bakersfield	2
2	Santa Barbara	2
4	Modesto	3

Finals
1	Stockton	4
4	Modesto	0

== Awards ==
California League awards
Award name	Recipient
Most Valuable Player	Tommy Glaviano, Fresno Cardinals

== See also ==
- 1946 Major League Baseball season
