= 1942 California League season =

- League: California League
- Sport: Baseball
- Duration: April 24 – June 28
- Games: 67
- Teams: 4

Regular season
- League champions: Santa Barbara Saints
- Season MVP: Sal Taormina, San Jose Owls

Playoffs

CALL seasons
- ← 1941 1946 →

The 1942 California League was a Class C baseball season played between April 19 and June 28. Four teams were to play a 140-game schedule, however, on June 28, the league ceased and suspended operations due to World War II.

== Team changes ==
- The Anaheim Aces folded by onset of World War II.
- The Merced Bears folded by onset of World War II.
- The Stockton Fliers folded by the onset of World War II.
- The San Jose Owls join the league as an expansion team.

== Teams ==
1942 California League
Team	City	MLB Affiliate	Stadium
Bakersfield Badgers	Bakersfield, California	None	Sam Lynn Ballpark
Fresno Cardinals	Fresno, California	St. Louis Cardinals	Cardinal Field
Santa Barbara Saints	Santa Barbara, California	Brooklyn Dodgers	Laguna Park
San Jose Owls	San Jose, California	None	San Jose Municipal Stadium

== Map of teams ==
California League Teams

== Regular season ==
=== Summary ===
- The Santa Barbara Saints finished with the best record in the regular season for the first time in club history.
- On June 28, the league ceased and suspended operations due to World War II.

=== Standings ===
California League
Team	Win	Loss	%	GB
Santa Barbara Saints	43	24	.642	–
San Jose Owls	35	32	.522	8
Fresno Cardinals	34	33	.507	9
Bakersfield Badgers	22	45	.328	21

== League Leaders ==
=== Batting leaders ===
Stat	Player	Total
AVG	Sal Taormina, San Jose Owls	.357
H	Charlie Sylvester, Santa Barbara Saints	93
2B	William Greer, Santa Barbara Saints	26
3B	Sal Taormina, San Jose Owls	8
HR	Edward Nulty, Santa Barbara Saints	10

=== Pitching leaders ===
Stat	Player	Total
W	Donald Belton, Fresno Cardinals; Brad Trine, Fresno Cardinals	11
ERA	Rex Cecil, Bakersfield Badgers	2.09
IP	Brad Trine, Fresno Cardinals	151.0

== Playoffs ==
- The 1942 playoffs were canceled as the season was suspended on June 28.

== Awards ==
California League awards
Award name	Recipient
Most Valuable Player	Sal Taormina, San Jose Owls

== See also ==
- 1942 Major League Baseball season
