= 1941 California League season =

- League: California League
- Sport: Baseball
- Duration: April 19 – September 1
- Games: 140
- Teams: 8

Regular season
- League champions: Fresno Cardinals
- Season MVP: Spider Jorgensen, Santa Barbara Saints

Playoffs
- League champions: Santa Barbara Saints
- Runners-up: Fresno Cardinals

CALL seasons
- 1942 →

The 1941 California League was a Class C baseball season played between April 19 and September 1. Eight teams played a 140-game schedule, with four teams qualifying for the post-season.

The Santa Barbara Saints won the California League championship, defeating the Fresno Cardinals in the final round of the playoffs.

== Formation of league ==
There were various attempts in the late 1800s and early 1900s to form a "California League" on the West Coast, considering the distance of the two current major leagues which generally had teams only in the Northeast and were restricted at first until World War I by long-distance train travel. The first organized California League lasted from 1887 to 1889, then another followed in 1891, and 1893, and finally in 1899–1902. After the National Association of Professional Baseball Leagues, an organization of minor leagues was formed in 1902, (following the "truce" and agreements between the older National League of 1876 and the newly "upstart" American League of 1901), the California League operated outside the NAPBL system as an independent league in 1902 and again from 1907 to 1909. This led to huge differences in the quality of teams competing with each other. In 1907, the San Francisco team was 3–34, while later in 1908 San Francisco was 9–67 and Oakland was 4–71. Oakland and San Francisco competed in every year of these various state leagues, with San Francisco having two teams during 1887–88.

The latest version of the California League was founded in 1941, and included teams in Anaheim, Bakersfield, Fresno, Merced, Riverside, San Bernardino, Santa Barbara, and Stockton.

== Teams ==
1941 California League
Team	City	MLB Affiliate	Stadium
Anaheim Aces	Anaheim, California	None	La Palma Park
Bakersfield Badgers	Bakersfield, California	None	Sam Lynn Ballpark
Fresno Cardinals	Fresno, California	St. Louis Cardinals	Cardinal Field
Merced Bears	Merced, California	None	Fairgrounds Field Park
Riverside Reds	Riverside, California	Cincinnati Reds	Evans Park
San Bernardino Stars	San Bernardino, California	New York Giants	Fiscalini Field
Santa Barbara Saints	Santa Barbara, California	Brooklyn Dodgers	Laguna Park
Stockton Fliers	Stockton, California	Chicago Cubs	Oak Park Field

== Map of teams ==
California League Teams

== Regular season ==
=== Summary ===
- The Fresno Cardinals finished with the best record in the regular season.
- On June 29, the Riverside Reds and San Bernardino Stars disbanded.

=== Standings ===
California League
Team	Win	Loss	%	GB
Fresno Cardinals	90	50	.643	–
Santa Barbara Saints	83	56	.597	6.5
Bakersfield Badgers	73	67	.521	17
Stockton Fliers	70	70	.500	20
Anaheim Aces	55	82	.401	33.5
Merced Bears	50	87	.365	38.5
San Bernardino Stars	43	28	.606	–
Riverside Reds	24	48	.333	–

== League Leaders ==
=== Batting leaders ===
Stat	Player	Total
AVG	Bud Clancy, Santa Barbara Saints	.344
H	Spider Jorgensen, Santa Barbara Saints	184
2B	Spider Jorgensen, Santa Barbara Saints	43
3B	George Silvey, Fresno Cardinals	19
HR	Mel Serafini, Fresno Cardinals	20

=== Pitching leaders ===
Stat	Player	Total
W	Warren Sandel, Fresno Cardinals	24
ERA	William Whaley, Stockton Fliers	2.08
IP	Gus Hallbourg, Anaheim Aces	275.0

== Playoffs ==
- The league semi-finals were a best-of-five series.
- The league finals were a best-of-seven series.
- The Santa Barbara Saints won their first California League championship, defeating the Fresno Cardinals in five games.

=== Playoff bracket ===
Semi-finals
1	Fresno	3
4	Stockon	1
2	Santa Barbara	3
3	Bakersfield	1

Finals
1	Fresno	1
2	Santa Barbara	4

== Awards ==
California League awards
Award name	Recipient
Most Valuable Player	Spider Jorgensen, Santa Barbara Saints

== See also ==
- 1941 Major League Baseball season
