= Dario Lodigiani =

American baseball player (1916–2008)

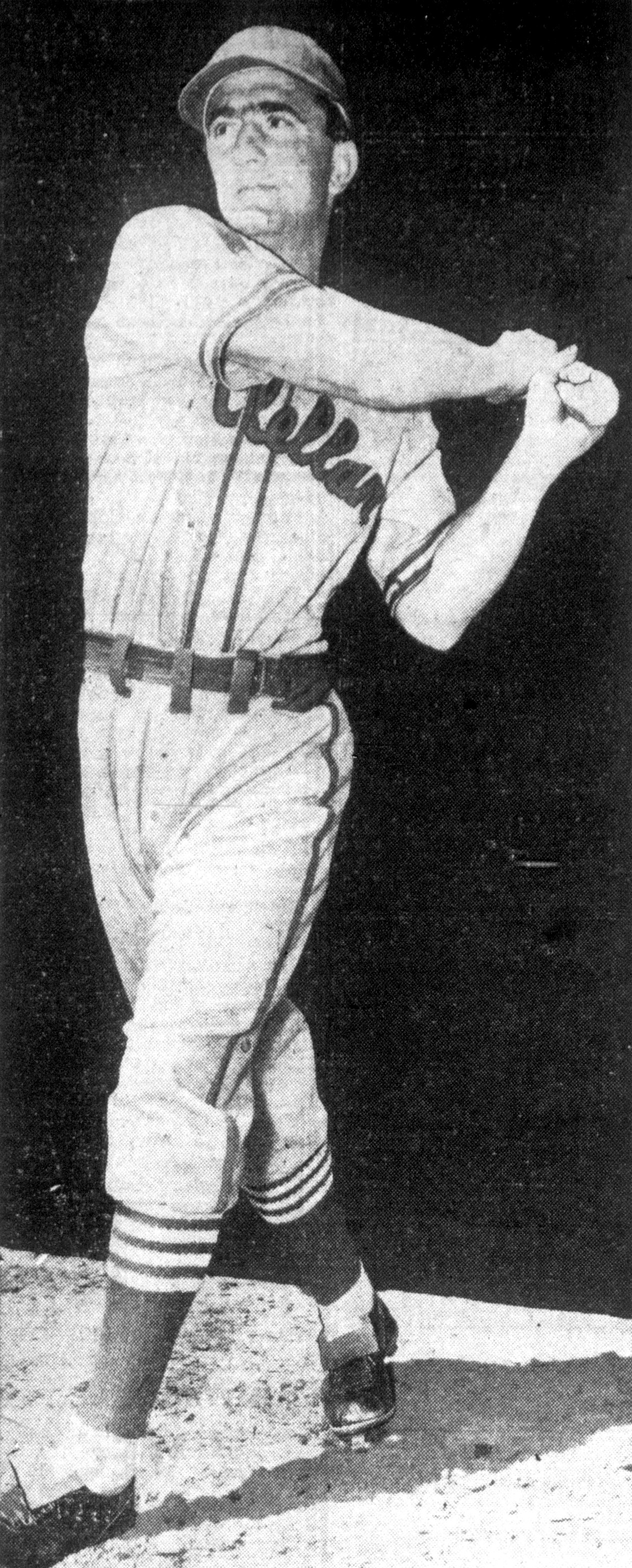
- Lodigiani, circa 1943
- Infielder
- Born: June 6, 1916; San Francisco, California, U.S.
- Died: February 10, 2008 (aged 91); Napa, California, U.S.
- Batted: Right Threw: Right

MLB debut
- April 18, 1938, for the Philadelphia Athletics

Last MLB appearance
- August 18, 1946, for the Chicago White Sox

MLB statistics
- Batting average: .260
- Home runs: 16
- Runs batted in: 156
- Stats at Baseball Reference

Teams
- Philadelphia Athletics (1938–1940); Chicago White Sox (1941–1942), (1946)

Dario Antonio Lodigiani (June 6, 1916 – February 10, 2008) was an American infielder in Major League Baseball who played for two different teams between 1938 and 1946. Listed at 5'8", 150 lb., he batted and threw right-handed. He was born in San Francisco, California. Lodigiani enjoyed a 17-year baseball career (1935–1954), playing parts of six seasons in the majors (1938–42, 1946) and 14 in the minor leagues (1935–40; 1947–54), losing three years while serving in the military (1943–45).

== Early life ==
He played second base for Lowell High School (San Francisco), as his double play partner was shortstop Joe DiMaggio. In 1935, he graduated from Galileo High School (SF), where he was an All-Star in the baseball, basketball and football teams.

== Professional career ==
At age 19, Lodigiani started his professional career with the Oakland Oaks of the Pacific Coast League (1935–37) and later joined the Williamsport Grays of the Eastern League (1938). He entered the majors in 1938 with the Philadelphia Athletics, playing for them until 1940 in one game before joining the Toronto Maple Leafs of the International League (1940). He returned to major league action with the Chicago White Sox (1941–42), and later served in the US Army Air Force during World War II (1943–45). After discharge, he rejoined the ChiSox in 1946, his last major league season.

In his rookie season with Philadelphia, Lodigiani posted a .280 batting average with six home runs and 44 RBI in 93 games. The next year he recorded career-highs in games (121), hits (102), runs (46), doubles (22), and matched his numbers in home runs and RBI while hitting .260.

In a six-season career, Lodigiani was a .260 hitter (355–for–1364) with 16 home runs and 156 RBI in 405 games, including 142 runs, 71 doubles, seven triples, 12 stolen bases, and a .338 on-base percentage. A disciplined hitter, he posted a solid 1.64 walk-to-strikeout ratio (141–to–86). On the field, he appeared in 275 games as a third baseman and 115 at second. He had an overall total of .948 fielding percentage (82 errors in 1582 chances).

Lodigiani returned to the Pacific Coast League with the Oakland Oaks (1947–49) and San Francisco Seals (1949–51). After that, he played and managed in the Western International League for Yakima (1952–53), and played with the Ventura Oilers (1953) and Channel Cities Oilers (1954) of the California League. Over 14 minor league seasons, he hit a .301 average with 74 home runs and 589 RBI. His best minor league season was with the 1937 Oaks, when he hit .327 with 35 doubles, 18 home runs and 84 RBI.

== Later life ==
Following his playing career, Lodigiani scouted for the Chicago White Sox, discovering or signing players such as Dave Frost, Rusty Kuntz, Jack McDowell, Rich Morales and Ken Williams. He also coached for the Cleveland Indians and Kansas City Athletics, and eventually gained induction to the Pacific Coast League Hall of Fame in 2006.

== Death ==
Lodigiani died in Napa, California on February 10, 2008.
