= Bobby Adams =

American baseball player and coach (1921–1997)

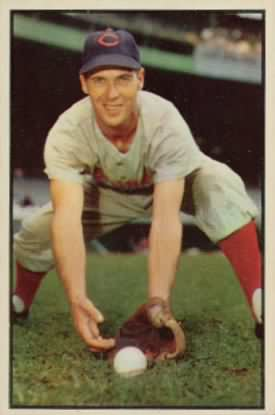
- Third baseman / Second baseman
- Born: December 14, 1921; Tuolumne, California, U.S.
- Died: February 13, 1997 (aged 75); Gig Harbor, Washington, U.S.
- Batted: Right Threw: Right

MLB debut
- April 16, 1946, for the Cincinnati Reds

Last MLB appearance
- April 22, 1959, for the Chicago Cubs

MLB statistics
- Batting average: .269
- Home runs: 37
- Runs batted in: 303
- Stats at Baseball Reference

Teams
- Cincinnati Reds / Redlegs (1946–1955); Chicago White Sox (1955); Baltimore Orioles (1956); Chicago Cubs (1957–1959)

Robert Henry Adams (December 14, 1921 – February 13, 1997) was an American professional baseball third baseman and second baseman. He played in Major League Baseball from 1946 through 1959 for the Cincinnati Reds / Redlegs, Chicago White Sox, Baltimore Orioles and Chicago Cubs. He batted and threw right-handed, stood at 5 feet 10 inches (1.78 m) tall and weighed 160 pounds (73 kg). He was born in Tuolumne County, California.

In a 14-season career, Adams posted a .269 batting average with 37 home runs and 303 RBI in 1281 games played.

Adams started his Major League career in 1946 with Cincinnati as their regular second baseman. Despite his infield background, the next five years he served mostly as a backup for Grady Hatton (3B) and Connie Ryan (2B). Finally, Adams became the regular third baseman for Cincinnati in 1951. His most productive season came in 1952, when he led the National League in singles (152), at-bats (637) and games (154), while batting .283 with career-numbers in hits (180) and doubles (25). He also was considered in National League MVP voting.

In the 1955 midseason, Adams was purchased by the Chicago White Sox. Traded to the Baltimore Orioles before 1956, he also played for the Chicago Cubs from 1957 to 1959, helping young infielders improve their play.

Following his playing career, Adams continued as a coach with the Cubs and was a member of the team's experimental College of Coaches. In 1966, the organization named him club president of the Triple-A Tacoma Cubs of the Pacific Coast League. But Adams’ six-year tenure in Tacoma ended after the 1971 season, when Chicago moved its Triple-A affiliate to Wichita, Kansas. After that, he again coached for the Cubs, in 1973, then retired from baseball.

Bobby Adams died in Gig Harbor, Washington, at age 75.

== Facts ==
- Adams hit a leadoff home run against Robin Roberts that wound up being the only hit the Cincinnati Redlegs got in an 8–1 loss on May 13, 1954
- Brother of 1B Dick Adams and father of OF Mike Adams.

== See also ==
- List of second generation MLB players
