= Mike Adams (outfielder) =

American baseball player (born 1948)

- Outfielder
- Born: July 24, 1948 (age 77); Cincinnati, Ohio, U.S.
- Batted: Right Threw: Right

MLB debut
- September 10, 1972, for the Minnesota Twins

Last MLB appearance
- July 25, 1978, for the Oakland Athletics

MLB statistics
- Batting average: .195
- Home runs: 3
- Runs batted in: 9
- Stats at Baseball Reference

Teams
- Minnesota Twins (1972–1973); Chicago Cubs (1976–1977); Oakland Athletics (1978)

Robert Michael Adams (born July 24, 1948) is an American former backup outfielder in Major League Baseball who played from 1972 through 1978 for the Minnesota Twins, Chicago Cubs and Oakland Athletics. Adams batted and threw right-handed.

Coming from a baseball family, Adams is the son of second baseman Bobby Adams and nephew of first baseman Dick Adams.

Adams reached the majors in 1972 with the Minnesota Twins, spending two years with them before moving to the Cubs and Athletics. In 1973 with Minnesota, Adams posted career-highs in games played (55), hits (14), runs (21), home runs (3) and RBI (six).

In parts of five seasons, Adams was a .195 hitter (23-for-118) with a .375 OBP, three home runs and nine RBI in 100 games.

== See also ==
- List of second-generation Major League Baseball players
