= Anaheim Aces =

- 1941–1941; Anaheim, California

Minor league affiliations
- Previous classes: Class C
- League: California League

Team data
- Previous parks: La Palma Park

The Anaheim Aces were a charter member of baseball's California League, founded in 1941 as a Class "C" minor league. The other charter teams were the Bakersfield Badgers, Fresno Cardinals, Merced Bears, Riverside Reds, San Bernardino Stars, Santa Barbara Saints, and Stockton Fliers. The Aces folded after the 1941 season, with America's entry into World War II.
