= Tommy Glaviano =

American baseball player (1923–2004)

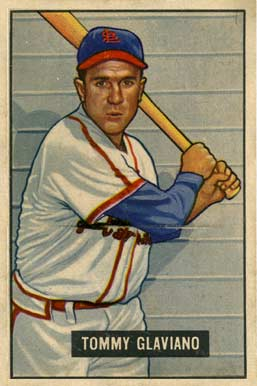
- Third baseman
- Born: October 26, 1923; Sacramento, California, U.S.
- Died: January 19, 2004 (aged 80); Sacramento, California, U.S.
- Batted: Right Threw: Right

MLB debut
- April 19, 1949, for the St. Louis Cardinals

Last MLB appearance
- September 26, 1953, for the Philadelphia Phillies

MLB statistics
- Batting average: .257
- Home runs: 24
- Runs batted in: 108
- Stats at Baseball Reference

Teams
- St. Louis Cardinals (1949–1952); Philadelphia Phillies (1953)

Thomas Giatano Glaviano (October 26, 1923 – January 19, 2004) was an American professional baseball third baseman, who played in Major League Baseball (MLB) for the St. Louis Cardinals and Philadelphia Phillies. He appeared in 389 big league games, between 1949 and 1953. Glaviano threw and batted right-handed, standing 5 feet 9 inches (1.75 m) tall, weighing 175 pounds (79 kg).

Glaviano, a native of Sacramento, California, served in the United States Coast Guard during World War II. According to his honorable discharge, he entered active service on December 24, 1942. He separated on December 15, 1945, at the rank of Seaman First Class. He served at Coast Guard Base Alameda, aboard the USS Dickman, and at the Coast Guard Recruiting Station in San Francisco.

In his finest season, 1950, Glaviano batted .285, with 92 runs scored, 117 hits, 11 home runs, and 29 doubles, as the Cardinals' starting third baseman. All told, he collected 259 hits during his five-season MLB career. Despite a middling career batting average of .257, he excelled at drawing walks and had an outstanding career on-base percentage of .395.
