= Bob Thorpe (pitcher) =

American baseball player (1935–1960)

- Pitcher
- Born: June 12, 1935; San Diego, California
- Died: March 17, 1960 (aged 24); San Diego, California
- Batted: Right Threw: Right

MLB debut
- April 17, 1955, for the Chicago Cubs

Last MLB appearance
- April 20, 1955, for the Chicago Cubs

MLB statistics
- Win–loss record: 0–0
- Earned run average: 3.00
- Innings pitched: 3
- Stats at Baseball Reference

Teams
- Chicago Cubs (1955)

Robert Joseph Thorpe (June 12, 1935 – March 17, 1960) was an American professional baseball player, a right-handed pitcher who experienced instant success at the minor league level, had a brief and promising trial with the 1955 Chicago Cubs of Major League Baseball, then was driven from the game by a sore arm and elbow surgery by the end of 1959. Less than a year after his retirement from baseball, Thorpe was working as an apprentice electrician on power lines in his native city of San Diego, California, when he was accidentally electrocuted at the age of 24.

Thorpe stood 6 feet 1 inch (1.85 m) tall and weighed 170 pounds (77 kg). He signed with the Cubs in 1953 and his first two seasons in baseball, with the Stockton Ports of the Class C California League, saw him win 44 of 56 decisions. In 1954, he was named the league's Most Valuable Player after posting a 28–4 record with the California circuit's top earned run average, 2.28, in 300 innings pitched. He threw 32 complete games in 33 assignments as a starting pitcher. The performance earned him a five-level promotion to the Major League Cubs at the outset of the 1955 season.

He appeared in two MLB games for the Cubs. In his debut, he worked the final inning of a 14–1 loss at the hands of the St. Louis Cardinals — but retired the Redbirds in order. In his second and final stint, Thorpe hurled the final two innings of another losing effort, this time against the Milwaukee Braves, and allowed two runs (one earned) on four hits.

Thorpe spent the rest of his career in the higher levels of the minors. He was selected by the Pittsburgh Pirates in the 1957 Rule 5 draft, but developed a sore arm. He missed the entire 1958 season after elbow surgery and retired after only three appearances at the Class A level in 1959.
