= Dick Adams (baseball) =

American baseball player (1920–2016)

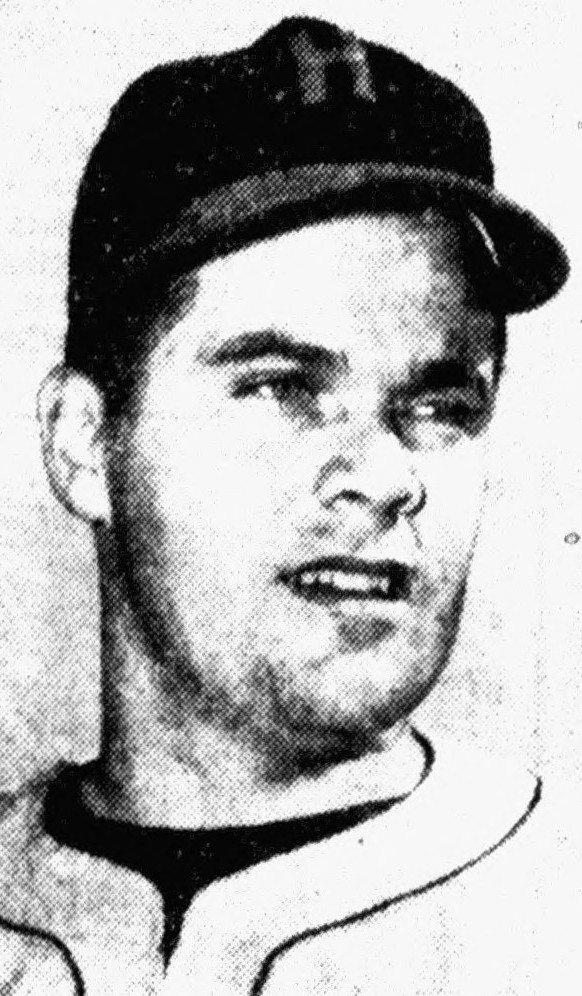
- Adams, circa 1948
- First baseman
- Born: April 8, 1920; Tuolumne County, California, U.S.
- Died: September 14, 2016 (aged 96); Fallbrook, California, U.S.
- Batted: Right Threw: Left

MLB debut
- May 20, 1947, for the Philadelphia Athletics

Last MLB appearance
- September 28, 1947, for the Philadelphia Athletics

MLB statistics
- Batting average: .202
- Home runs: 2
- Runs batted in: 11
- Stats at Baseball Reference

Teams
- Philadelphia Athletics (1947)

Richard Leroy Adams (April 8, 1920 – September 14, 2016) was an American former first baseman in Major League Baseball, playing briefly for the Philadelphia Athletics during the 1947 season. Born in Tuolumne County, California, he batted right-handed and threw left-handed.

Coming from a baseball family, Adams was the older brother of second baseman Bobby Adams and uncle of outfielder Mike Adams. He started his professional career in 1939 with the Cincinnati Reds affiliate Ogden Reds of the Pioneer League, spending three seasons in the minor leagues seasons before enlisting in the US Army Air Force in 1941. Discharged from the service at the end of 1945, he played and managed the Santa Ana, California Army Air Base team, for which Joe DiMaggio played.

== Philadelphia Athletics (1947) ==
In 1946, Adams hit .330 with 155 RBI for the Wenatchee Chiefs of the Western International League, and was drafted by the Philadelphia Athletics. He remained with the Athletics for the 1947 season, appearing in 37 games. Adams posted a .202 average (18-for-89) with two home runs and 11 RBI, including nine runs, two doubles, and three triples. His first hit in the majors was a home run; Adams still has the ball from that game. Following his Major League career, Adams returned to the minors, initially with the 1948 Hollywood Stars and continued playing until 1953 finishing with the Class C Ventura Oilers of the California League.

== Later life ==
Adams was a professional musician and led his own group during the off season of baseball. Adams died in September 2016 at the age of 96 in Fallbrook, California.
