= Tom Hughes (1950s pitcher) =

Panamanian baseball player (1934–2019)

- Starting pitcher
- Born: September 13, 1934; Ancón, Panama Canal Zone
- Died: November 2, 2019 (aged 85); Deer Park, Texas, U.S.
- Batted: Left Threw: Right

MLB debut
- September 13, 1959, for the St. Louis Cardinals

Last MLB appearance
- September 21, 1959, for the St. Louis Cardinals

MLB statistics
- Win–loss record: 0–2
- Earned run average: 15.75
- Strikeouts: 2
- Stats at Baseball Reference

Teams
- St. Louis Cardinals (1959)

Thomas Edward Hughes (September 13, 1934 – November 2, 2019) was an American professional baseball player who appeared in two games for the 1959 St. Louis Cardinals of Major League Baseball. Born in Ancón, Panama Canal Zone, the son of a police official working in the then-American-controlled Canal Zone territory, Hughes was a right-handed pitcher who batted left-handed and was listed as 6 feet 2 inches (1.88 m) tall and 180 pounds (82 kg). He signed with the Cardinals in 1954.

As a minor league pitcher, Hughes posted gaudy win–loss records during his early career, winning 52 of 68 decisions (.765) between 1955 and 1957 for teams in the Class C California League and the Double-A Texas League. He led the California League in strikeouts with 273 and won 20 games during 1955. But he was treated late in 1956 for elbow soreness, then missed the entire 1958 campaign and almost all of 1959 while serving in the United States Army.

Upon his discharge in August 1959, Hughes was added to the Cardinals' expanded roster that September. With the Redbirds languishing in the second division, manager Solly Hemus gave the rookie two auditions as a starting pitcher, with both games against the Chicago Cubs. On September 13, his 25th birthday, at Wrigley Field, Hughes lasted into the third inning, but allowed five earned runs on five hits (including home runs by Ernie Banks and Irv Noren) and two bases on balls, and was tagged with the 8–0 defeat. Eight days later, at Busch Stadium, Hughes retired only four batters, and was charged with surrendering four hits and four earned runs. He again was charged with a loss, as Chicago went on to win, 12–3.

In 1960, Hughes returned to the minor leagues and spent two more seasons in the Cardinal organization before retiring from pro baseball. In his two MLB games, he allowed a total of nine hits and nine earned runs in four full innings pitched, for an earned run average of 15.75. He struck out two and issued two bases on balls.
