= Banner Island Ballpark =

Baseball stadium in Stockton, California

- Stockton Ballpark
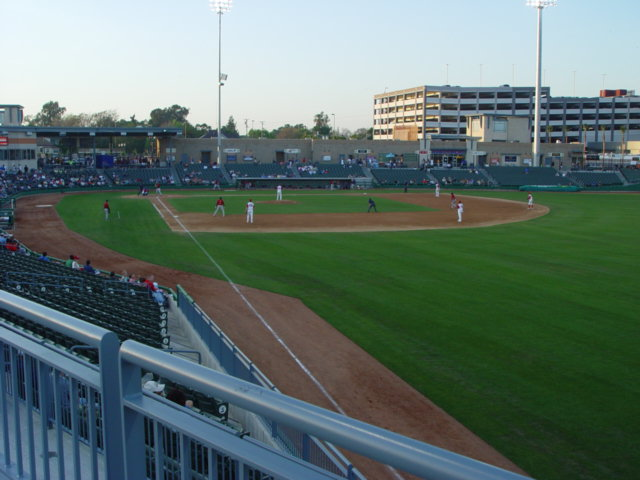
- Interactive map of Banner Island Ballpark
- Location: 404 West Fremont Street; Stockton, California; United States
- Coordinates: 37°57′17.48″N 121°17′52.64″W
- Owner: City of Stockton
- Operator: SMG
- Capacity: 5,200 (baseball)
- Surface: Grass
- Field size: Left Field: 300 feet (91 m); Center Field: 399 feet (122 m); Right Field: 326 feet (99 m)

Construction
- Groundbreaking: April 17, 2004
- Opened: April 28, 2005
- Cost: $22 Million ($36.3 million in 2025 dollars)
- Architect: HKS, Inc.
- Project manager: McCuskey Group
- Services engineers: Frank M. Booth, Inc.
- General contractor: Swinerton Builders

Tenant
- Stockton Ports (CL) (2005–present)

Website
- https://www.milb.com/stockton/ballpark/banner-island-ballpark

Banner Island Ballpark is a ballpark located in Stockton, California, on the Stockton waterfront, which seats 5,200 people with 4,200 fixed seats. It is the home field of the Stockton Ports, a minor league affiliate of the Athletics in the California League, who moved there after spending several decades at their previous home Billy Hebert Field.

== History ==
The $22 million Banner Island Ballpark opened with a baseball game on April 28, 2005, during which the Stockton Ports defeated the San Jose Giants, 7–4, in front of a sellout crowd of 5,287 fans. The ballpark is a part of a revitalization project for the Downtown Stockton waterfront. It was built concurrently with the Stockton Arena and will be integrated with a waterfront park as part of the Stockton Waterfront Events Center.

The Banner Island area is also the purported home of a previous Stockton baseball team that played in the late 1800s. Local residents claim that the team was the inspiration for the Mudville Nine in "Casey at the Bat", a poem by Ernest Thayer. Before moving to the ballpark, the Stockton Ports were known as the Mudville Nine during the 2000 and 2001 seasons.

== Name ==
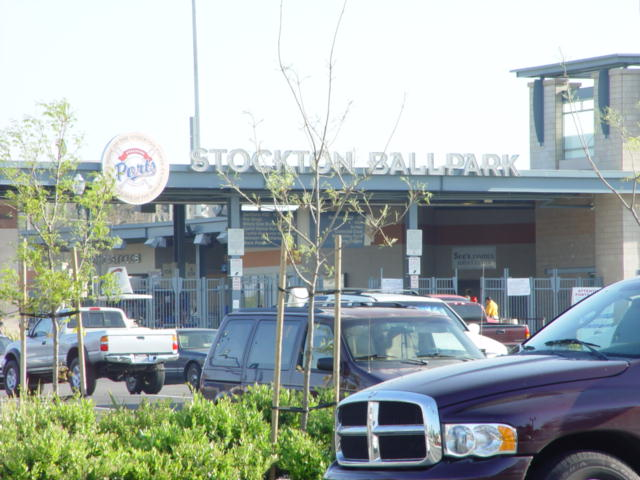
Ballpark Entrance; note the signage that says "Stockton Ballpark"

The name "Banner Island Ballpark" is actually an unofficial name that is used among fans and the administration of the Stockton Ports. The City of Stockton owns the naming rights of the ballpark and until the rights are sold the stadium is officially known as Stockton Ballpark.

The ballpark gets its unofficial name from the area in which it is located, Banner Island. This was once an island in the San Joaquin River delta, noted during the Civil War for the huge "Stars and Stripes" posted by a Union supporter. In time the island was connected to the mainland through land fill and only the southern shore remains. Despite the fact the area is no longer an island, the Banner Island name has stuck.
