= Jess Pike =

American baseball player (1915-1984)

- Outfielder
- Born: July 31, 1915; Dustin, Oklahoma, U.S.
- Died: March 28, 1984 (aged 68); San Diego, California, U.S.
- Batted: Left Threw: Right

MLB debut
- April 18, 1946, for the New York Giants

Last MLB appearance
- May 18, 1946, for the New York Giants

MLB statistics
- Batting average: .171
- Home runs: 1
- Runs batted in: 6
- Stats at Baseball Reference

Teams
- New York Giants (1946)

Jess Willard Pike (July 31, 1915 – March 28, 1984) was an American Major League Baseball outfielder. He played part of the 1946 season for the New York Giants.

Before and after his brief major league stint, Pike played in the minor leagues for sixteen years in total, from 1937 until 1952. He began his career as a pitcher with the Monahans Trojans of the West Texas–New Mexico League, but by 1939 he had been converted to the outfield.

== Sources ==
- Career statistics from Baseball Reference · Baseball Reference (Minors) · Retrosheet · Baseball Almanac
