= Bobby Smith (baseball) =

American baseball player (1934–2015)

- Outfielder
- Born: May 28, 1934; Hood River, Oregon, U.S.
- Died: November 24, 2015 (aged 81); Hood River, Oregon, U.S.
- Batted: Right Threw: Right

MLB debut
- April 16, 1957, for the St. Louis Cardinals

Last MLB appearance
- July 17, 1965, for the Los Angeles Angels

MLB statistics
- Batting average: .243
- Home runs: 13
- Runs batted in: 96
- Stats at Baseball Reference

Teams
- St. Louis Cardinals (1957–1959; 1962); Philadelphia Phillies (1960–1961); New York Mets (1962); Chicago Cubs (1962); Los Angeles Angels (1965)

Bobby Gene Smith (May 28, 1934 – November 24, 2015) was an American professional baseball player, an outfielder who appeared in 376 games in the Major Leagues between 1957–1965 for the St. Louis Cardinals, Chicago Cubs, Philadelphia Phillies, New York Mets and Los Angeles Angels. He threw and batted right-handed, stood 5 feet 11 inches (1.80 m) tall and weighed 180 pounds (82 kg).

Smith was an original member of the Mets, drafted with the 32nd selection in the 1961 Major League Baseball expansion draft. However, he only spent the first two weeks of the 1962 season with the team, playing in eight games, including five as a starting outfielder, before being dealt to the Cubs on April 26, then sent on to his original team, the Cardinals, on June 5, spending the rest of that campaign as a late-inning replacement for veteran Cardinals superstar Stan Musial in left field.

In 1958, he was one of three Bob Smiths in the Majors, along with pitchers Robert Gilchrist Smith of the Pittsburgh Pirates and Robert Walkup "Riverboat" Smith of the Boston Red Sox. During his career, outfielder Smith was frequently referred to as Bobby Gene Smith by baseball writers to prevent confusion.

Smith's 234 Major-League hits included 35 doubles, five triples and 13 home runs. His best year in the big leagues was in 1960, when he was the Phillies' semi-regular left fielder. That year, Smith reached personal bests in hits (62), home runs (4), runs batted in (27) and batting average (.286). He also batted over .300 during his ten-year minor-league career, which ended in 1967.
