= Dave Melton =

American baseball player (1928-2008)

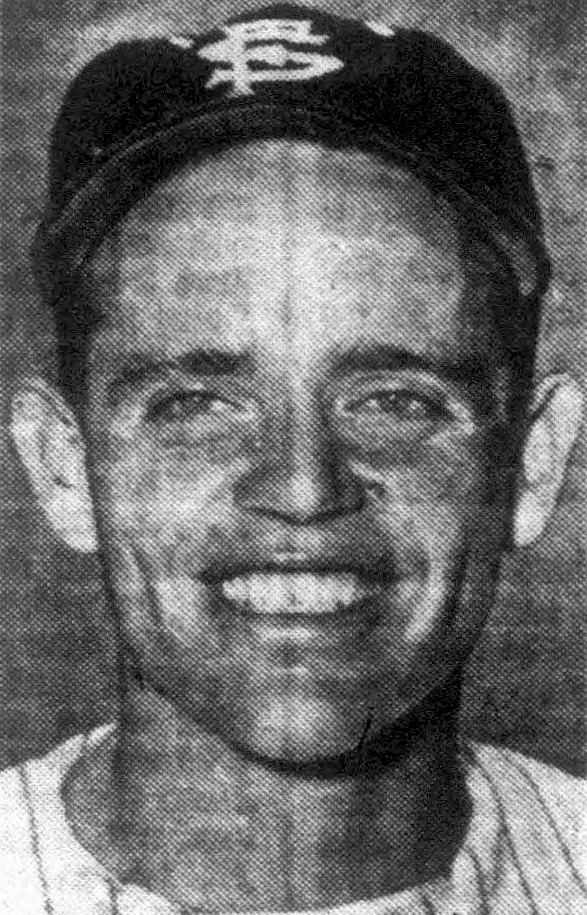
- Melton, circa 1953
- Outfielder
- Born: October 3, 1928; Pampa, Texas, U.S.
- Died: October 23, 2008 (aged 80); Cupertino, California, U.S.
- Batted: Right Threw: Right

MLB debut
- April 17, 1956, for the Kansas City Athletics

Last MLB appearance
- June 11, 1958, for the Kansas City Athletics

MLB statistics
- Batting average: .111
- Home runs: 0
- Runs batted in: 0
- Stats at Baseball Reference

Teams
- Kansas City Athletics (1956; 1958)

David Olin Melton (October 3, 1928 – October 23, 2008) was an American Major League Baseball outfielder. He played for the Kansas City Athletics of Major League Baseball during the 1956 and 1958 seasons. Melton threw and batted right-handed, stood 6 feet (1.8 metres) tall and weighed 180 pounds (82 kilograms).

Born in Pampa, Texas, he attended high school in Coronado, California, and played college baseball at Stanford University. His minor league career (1950; 1953–1959; 1962) was spent almost entirely on the West Coast, and he was a popular member of the San Francisco Seals of the Pacific Coast League. He batted .299 for the 1955 Seals and reached career highs in home runs (19), runs batted in (116) and hits (184).

At the Major League level, Melton played in only 12 games, batted nine times, and made one hit, a single off Frank Lary of the Detroit Tigers in his first MLB at bat on April 17, 1956.
