= Channel Cities Oilers =

- 1954–1955; Ventura, California; Santa Barbara, California

Minor league affiliations
- Class: Class C
- League: California League

Team data
- Ballpark: Ventura: Babe Ruth Field; Santa Barbara: Laguna Ball Park

The Channel Cities Oilers were a minor league baseball team in the California League that played in 1954 and 1955. They were based in Ventura, California, and also in the neighboring resort town of Santa Barbara, California. They played their home games at Laguna Park and Babe Ruth Field in Seaside Park. Their team name reflected the off-shore oil well drilling industry in the Santa Barbara Channel that began in the 1950s and was curtailed by a catastrophic oil spill in 1969.

Notable major league players include Chuck Essegian, Al Gionfriddo, Dario Lodigiani (who managed the Ventura team in 1954) and Dave Melton. They moved to become the Reno Silver Sox midway through the 1955 season.
