= Merced Bears =

- 1941; Merced, California

Minor league affiliations
- Previous classes: Class C
- League: California League

The Merced Bears were a minor league baseball team in the Class C California League in 1941. Bears is also the name of the athletic teams of Merced High School.
