= Tony Freitas =

American baseball player (1908–1994)

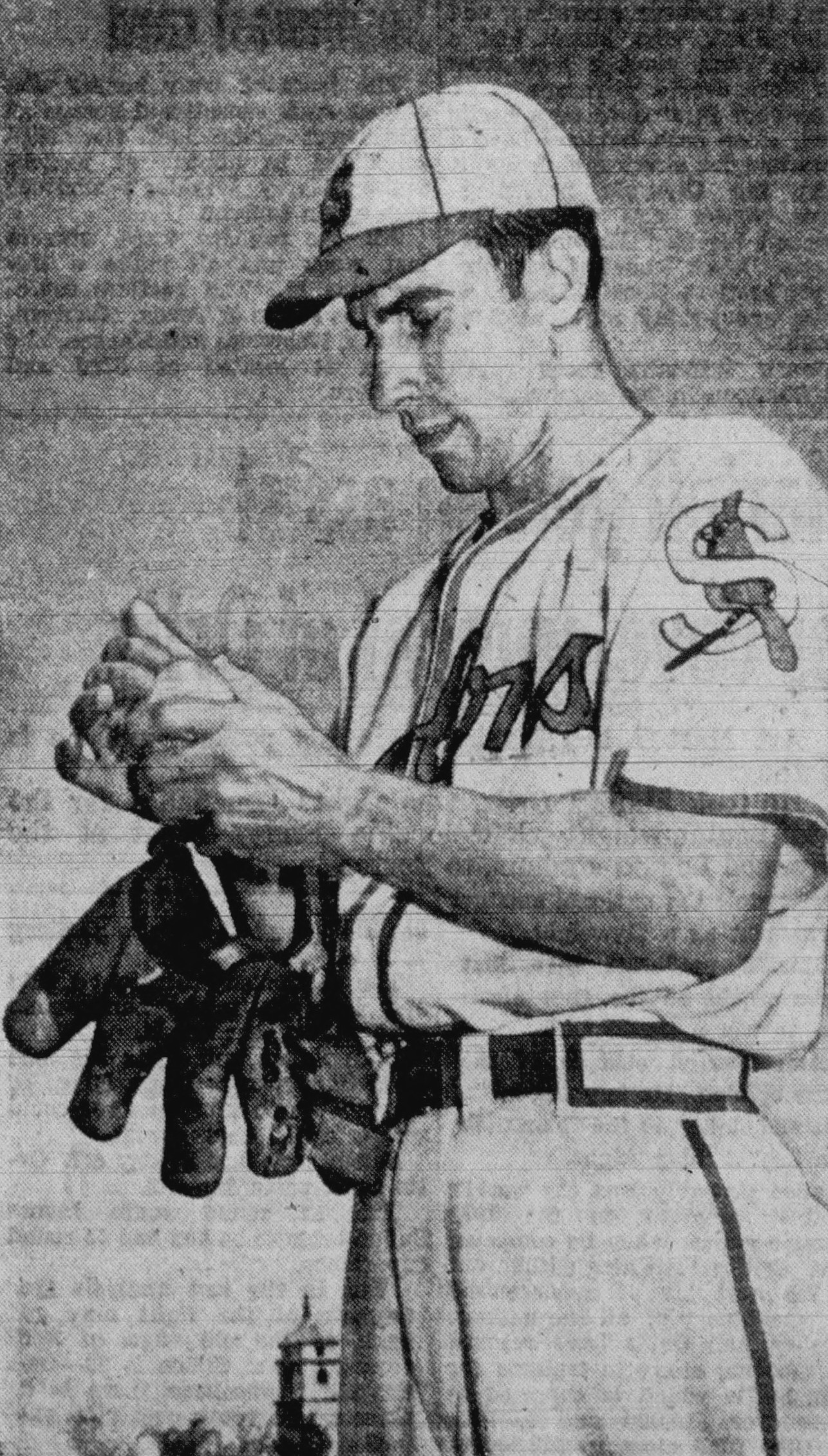
- Freitas, circa 1942
- Pitcher
- Born: May 5, 1908; Mill Valley, California, U.S.
- Died: March 14, 1994 (aged 85); Orangevale, California, U.S.
- Batted: Right Threw: Left

MLB debut
- May 31, 1932, for the Philadelphia Athletics

Last MLB appearance
- May 31, 1936, for the Cincinnati Reds

MLB statistics
- Win–loss record: 25–33
- Earned run average: 4.48
- Strikeouts: 135
- Stats at Baseball Reference

Teams
- Philadelphia Athletics (1932–1933); Cincinnati Reds (1934–1936)

Antonio Freitas, Jr. (May 5, 1908 – March 14, 1994) was an American baseball player who played as a pitcher in the minor leagues and Major League Baseball, spending most of his career with the Sacramento Senators of the Pacific Coast League. He played in the majors with the Philadelphia Athletics (1932–1933) and the Cincinnati Reds (1934–1936). He batted right-handed and threw left-handed.

Born in Mill Valley, California, Freitas attended Tamalpais High School in the mid-1920s. His father, who was Portuguese, was reluctant to allow Freitas to play baseball because of his duties on the family farm. Freitas was ultimately allowed to play for the school's baseball team while his older brothers, George and Arthur, tended to the cows.

He was recruited by the Senators, playing with two of their Arizona farm clubs in 1928 and 1929. He moved up to the PCL with the Senators during the 1929 season. He won 19 games in both the 1930 and 1931 seasons.

After pitching a no-hitter on his birthday in 1932, Freitas moved up to the Philadelphia Athletics for two seasons, followed by three with the Cincinnati Reds. He went back down to the minors during the 1936 season, returning to the Sacramento team (by then named the Solons) in 1937.

Freitas served in the U.S. Army Air Corps during World War II from 1943 to 1945 and was stationed at Mather Air Force Base. He returned to the PCL with the Solons after the war, playing there into the 1950 season. He completed his 25-year playing career with four seasons in the California League, playing for the Modesto Reds in 1950 and 1951 and for the Stockton Ports in 1952 and 1953. He was the manager of the Solons in the 1954 and 1955 seasons.

With 342 wins in the minors, Freitas is fourth all-time and is the winningest left-handed pitcher. He won 20 or more games nine times. He has been selected for the Pacific Coast League's Hall of Fame and for its All-Century Team.

Freitas died in Orangevale, California, at the age of 85.
