= Ventura Oilers =

- 1947–1953; Ventura, California

Minor league affiliations
- Previous classes: Class-C
- League: California League

Major league affiliations
- Previous teams: Boston Braves (1950–1952); New York Yankees (1947–1949)

Team data
- Previous names: Ventura Oilers (1953); Ventura Braves (1950–1952); Ventura Yankees (1947–1949)
- Previous parks: Babe Ruth Field

The Ventura Oilers were a California League baseball team based in Ventura, California, USA that played from 1947 to 1953. They were affiliated with the San Francisco Seals of the Pacific Coast League in 1953, the Boston Braves from 1950 to 1952 and the New York Yankees from 1947 to 1949 and played their home games at Babe Ruth Field.

Notable players for the Ventura Oilers include Dick Adams, Dario Lodigiani and Dave Melton. Lodigiani also managed the team. Bat Boys for the team included Robert and Frank Buck.

Notable major league players that played for the Ventura Braves included Gene Lillard, Bob Roselli and Bobby Sturgeon. Lillard and Sturgeon also managed the Ventura team.

The team became the Channel Cities Oilers in 1954 and then the Reno Silver Sox in 1955.

== Notable alumni ==
- Frank Lucchesi (1948-1949)
- Tom Morgan (1949)
- Hal Smith (1949)
