= Babe Ruth Field =

Ballpark in Ventura, California

Coordinates: 34°16′33″N 119°17′56″W

Babe Ruth Field was a ballpark in Ventura, California, United States, named after the famous baseball player George Herman ("Babe") Ruth, (1895–1948), of Baltimore, that was used as a minor-league park from 1948 to 1955. Tenant franchises (all of the old California League) included the Ventura Yankees, (1947–1949), the Ventura Braves, (1950–1952), and the Channel Cities Oilers, (1954–1955).

The site of the old stadium is now the Seaside Park (commonly called the Ventura County Fairgrounds) adjacent parking lot, now directly in front of the Ventura train platform/station, served by Amtrak's (National Rail Passenger Corp.), West Coastal trains, the Pacific Surfliner, from San Diego to San Luis Obispo, and the non-stop express Coast Starlight. This broad flat area adjacent to the Pacific Ocean beach took the name of Seaside Park after Eugene P. (E. P.) and Orpha Foster donated the land to the public. They envisioned a beautiful waterfront gateway to the town of Ventura, where families could walk, picnic, and enjoy family outings.
