= Excite Ballpark =

Baseball stadium in San Jose, California, US

- Muni Stadium

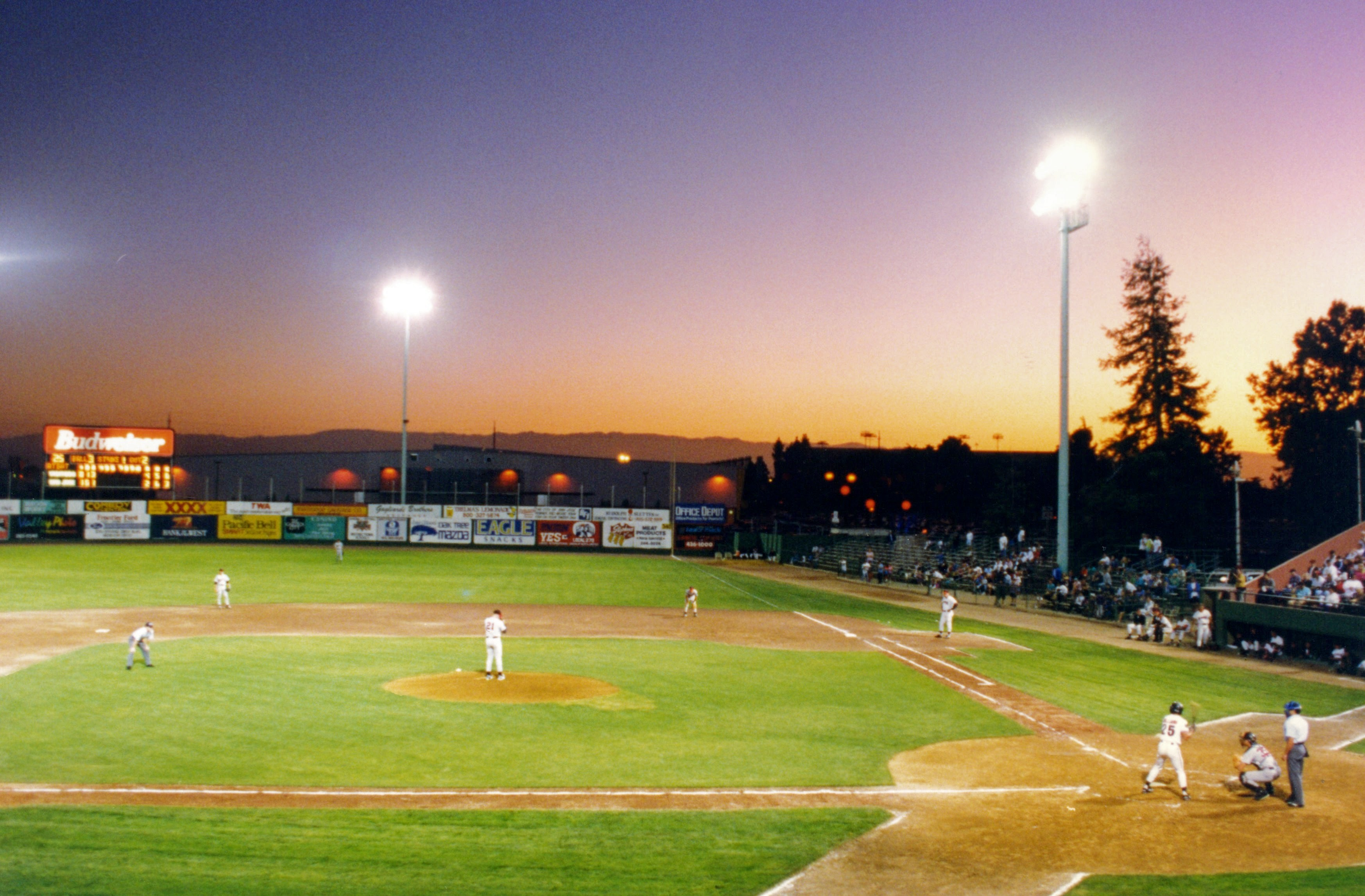
- Interactive map of Excite Ballpark
- Former names: San Jose Municipal Stadium (1942–2019)
- Location: 588 East Alma Avenue; San Jose, California; United States
- Coordinates: 37°19′14″N 121°51′44″W
- Owner: City of San Jose
- Operator: San Jose Giants
- Capacity: 2,900 (1942); 5,208 (current)
- Surface: Baby Bermuda Grass
- Field size: Left Field: 320 feet (98 m); Left-Center: 365 feet (111 m); Center Field: 390 feet (120 m); Right-Center: 365 feet (111 m); Right Field: 320 feet (98 m)
- Public transit: VTA Bus: 73

Construction
- Groundbreaking: April 1941
- Opened: March 8, 1942
- Cost: US$80,000 ($1.58 million in 2025 dollars)
- Architect: Works Progress Administration

Tenants
- San Jose Giants (CL) 1988–present San Jose Bees (CL) 1983–1987; San Jose Expos (CL) 1982; San Jose Missions (CL) 1979–1981; San Jose Missions (PCL) 1977–1978; San Jose Bees (CL) 1962–1976; San Jose Pirates (CL) 1958; San Jose JoSox (CL) 1956–1957; San Jose Red Sox (CL) 1947–1955; San Jose Owls (CL) 1942; San Jose State Spartans (NCAA) 1970–present

Excite Ballpark, previously known as San Jose Municipal Stadium or Muni Stadium, is a baseball park in San Jose, California. It is the home of Minor League Baseball's San Jose Giants, an affiliate of the San Francisco Giants. The team plays in the North Division of the California League. The stadium is also home to the San Jose State University Spartans college baseball team. Local high school baseball divisions also use the ballpark as their championship field. The stadium also hosts concerts, weddings, car shows, and many other community events. It has been the home field for the San Jose Owls, San Jose Red Sox, San Jose Jo Sox, San Jose Pirates, San Jose Missions, San Jose Bees, and the San Jose Expos minor league teams.

The facility is located one block from Spartan Stadium, home to the San Jose State Spartans football team. The area across Alma Avenue from Excite is home to the San Jose State practice fields for soccer, baseball, and softball. Additionally part of the stadium's parking lot was converted into an indoor ice area, Sharks Ice San Jose, which is the practice venue for the San Jose Sharks National Hockey League hockey team.

== History ==
San Jose Municipal Stadium was built from 1941 to 1942 as a WPA project at a cost of US$80,000. It was one of the first stadiums to be built entirely of reinforced concrete. It opened in 1942 with a game that featured the San Francisco Seals as the home team.

Fans sit very close to the field in four distinct seating areas. The first seven rows of the main grandstand are numbered box seats. General admission seating is available in the upper rows of the main grandstand on straight-backed benches. Down the left and right field lines are several bleachers that are accessible for general admission use. There is table seating down the third base line as part of "Turkey Mike's BBQ Area". The stadium has remained largely unchanged from its original configuration. However, renovations to the bathroom facilities and clubhouse were done in 1994 and three extra rows of box seating were added in 1996. In 1999, the dugouts were expanded toward the field.

The outfield walls are lined with advertisements, much like the stadiums of the 1920s and 1930s. Over the scoreboard in right field is a Diamond Vision video screen. The out of town scoreboard provides scores for other California League games. Fans are treated to a variety of games and entertainment in-between innings. Such activities include a tire toss, a child footrace around the bases and a fan favorite, "Smash 4 Cash", a competition where players attempt to smash the headlights of an old delivery truck to split a $50 prize with a fan. Each year's Independence Day celebration, complete with fireworks, draws some of the stadium's largest crowds and sees the foul line seating turned into standing room only.

In 1997, the bullpens moved from along the foul lines to the outfield. The visitor and home bullpens create artificial home run porches in left and right field respectively. In 2007, the outfield fence was replaced and moved in 10 to 20 feet (3.0–6.1 m) in some areas and bullpens moved once again.

Many major league players over the years have called San Jose Municipal Stadium home including, George Brett, Rod Beck, Joe Nathan, Chad Zerbe, Ron Hassey, Shawn Estes, Tim Lincecum, Matt Cain, Madison Bumgarner, Buster Posey, and Brandon Crawford.

Stadium features include: the San Jose Giants Dugout Store, group spaces such as the Martinelli's VIP Deck, City National Futures Club and First Base Party Patio, the Astro Jump Family Fun Zone, Turkey Mike's BBQ, and a 36-foot (11-metre) HD video board. The San Jose Giants mascot, Gigante, is often found having fun with fans at the ballpark and throughout the community.

In 2019, the San Jose Giants entered into a three-year naming rights agreement with Excite Credit Union to rename the facility Excite Ballpark. It is one of the oldest active ballparks in Minor League Baseball.

In the pandemic-shortened 2020 season, the Oakland Athletics used Excite Ballpark as their alternate training site.

== See also ==
- List of NCAA Division I baseball venues
