= Valley Strong Ballpark =

Baseball stadium in Visalia, California

- Rec Park

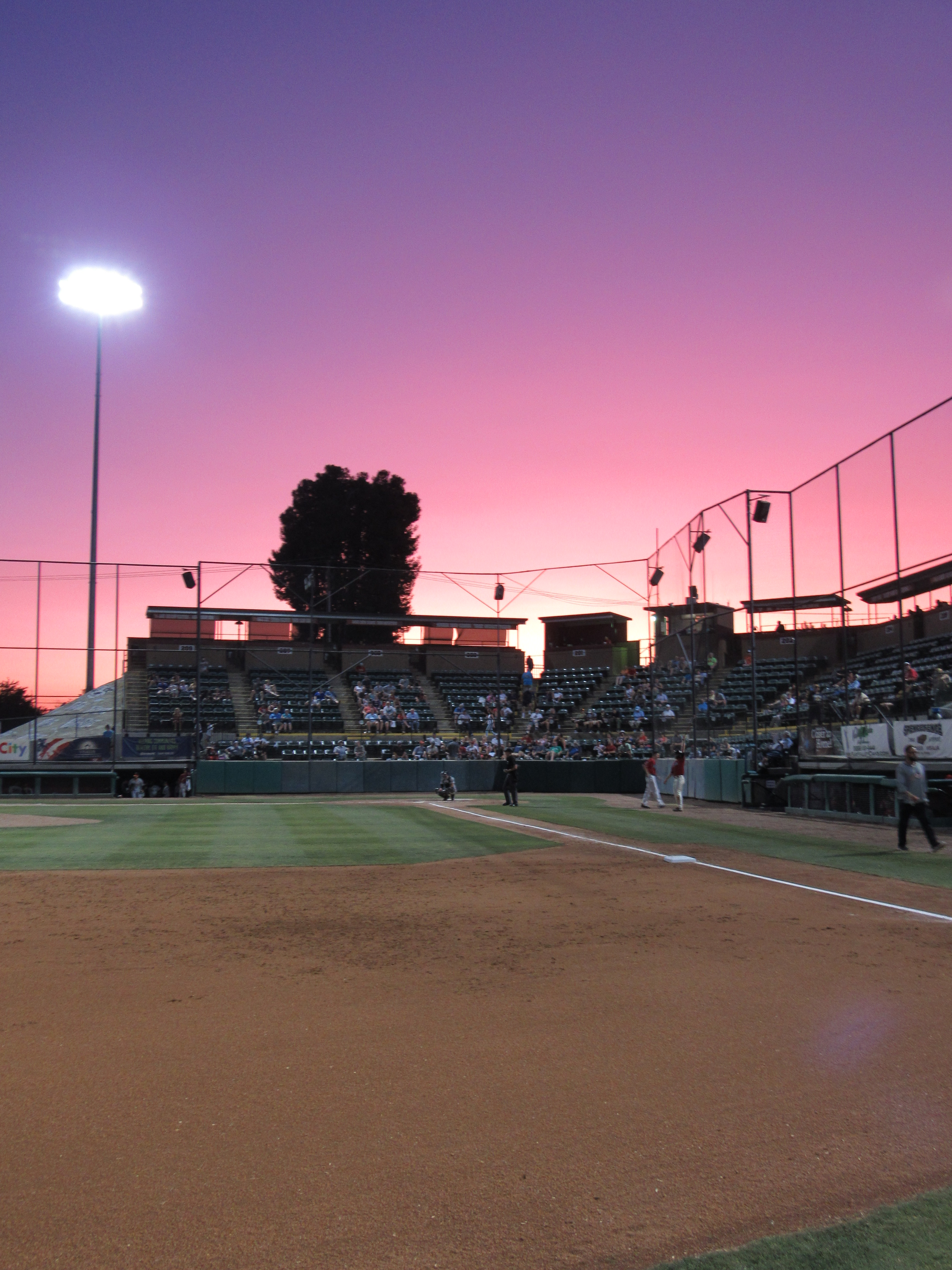
- Interactive map of Valley Strong Ballpark
- Location: 300 North Giddings Street; Visalia, CA 93291
- Coordinates: 36°19′57″N 119°18′17″W
- Owner: City of Visalia
- Operator: Visalia Rawhide Baseball Club
- Capacity: 2,468 (1,888 permanent stadium seats)
- Surface: Grass
- Field size: Left Field - 320 ft Left-Center Power Alley - 365 ft Center Field - 405 ft Right-Center Power Alley - 365 ft Right Field - 320 ft Backstop - 50 ft

Construction
- Groundbreaking: 1946
- Opened: April 1946
- Renovated: 1967, 2002, 2009
- Cost: $50,000 ($825,512 in 2025 dollars) $11.6 million (renovations)
- Architects: Fehlman & LeBarre (renovations)

Tenant
- Visalia Rawhide (CL) (1946–present)

Valley Strong Ballpark is a minor league baseball stadium in Visalia, California. The stadium, formerly known as Recreation Ballpark, currently serves as the home to the Visalia Rawhide of the California League. The Rawhide is an affiliate of the Arizona Diamondbacks.

With only 1,888 seats, plus capacity for another 580 fans on a lawn, it is the smallest MLB-affiliated ballpark.

The ballpark was built by the city of Visalia in 1946. In 2003, the stadium began a six-year renovation and expansion that added a grandstand and more seats on the third-base side. It is one of the oldest active ballparks in Minor League Baseball.

From 2014 to 2018, Valley Strong Ballpark hosted Divisions I-VI of the California Interscholastic Federation Central Section Baseball Championships, before relocating in 2019 to Pete Beiden Field at Bob Bennett Stadium at California State University, Fresno.
