= Billy Hebert Field =

Stadium in California, United States

Coordinates: 37.983674°N 121.29341°W

Billy Hebert Field is a stadium in Stockton, California, United States. It is used primarily for baseball and was the home field of the Stockton Ports until they moved to Banner Island Ballpark in 2005. The stadium continues to be used as a venue for high school baseball playoffs. It was also used as a practice facility for the Stockton Lightning minor Arena League football team. The ballpark has a capacity of 6,000 people and opened in 1953. Prior to 1953, the land upon which the field is built was used for baseball since the late 19th century. In 1927, Oak Park Field was constructed. After the field's grandstand was destroyed by fire for a second time, the modern-day grandstand was built in 1953. The field is named for Billy Hebert, the first professional baseball player to die in World War II.
