= San Jose Red Sox =

- 1947–1958; San Jose, California

Minor league affiliations
- Previous classes: Class-C
- League: California League

Major league affiliations
- Previous teams: Pittsburgh Pirates (1957–1958); Boston Red Sox (1947–1955)

Minor league titles
- League titles: 1949, 1953

Team data
- Previous names: San Jose Pirates (1958); San Jose JoSox (1956–1957); San Jose Red Sox (1947–1955)

The San Jose Red Sox were a Boston Red Sox affiliate from 1947 to 1955, located in San Jose, California. They competed in the California League and they played at San Jose Municipal Stadium and won league championships in 1949 and 1953. After the end of their Red Sox affiliation, they changed the team name to the San Jose JoSox for two seasons before becoming the San Jose Pirates as a Pittsburgh Pirates affiliate in 1958. They moved to Las Vegas, Nevada on May 26, 1958 to become the Las Vegas Wranglers.

San Jose would return to baseball when the San Jose Bees began operations in 1962.

== Notable alumni ==
- Joe DeMaestri (1947-1948) MLB All-Star
- Dick Gernert (1950)
- Marty Keough (1952-1953)
- Bob Lee (1957) MLB All-Star
- Marv Owen (1947-1951)
- Albie Pearson (1953) MLB All-Star; 1958 AL Rookie of the Year
- Frank Sullivan (1948-1949) 2 x MLB All-Star
- Bob Veale (1958) 2 x MLB All-Star
- Earl Wilson (1954)

== Year-by-year record ==
Year	Record	Finish	Manager	Playoffs
1947	79–61	3rd	Marv Owen	Lost in 1st round
1948	64–76	7th	Marv Owen	
1949	76–64	4th	Marv Owen	League Champs
1950	78–62	4th	Marv Owen	Lost in 1st round
1951	80–67	2nd	Marv Owen	Lost in 1st round
1952	74–66	3rd	Red Marion	Lost League Finals
1953	93–47	1st	Red Marion / Joe Stephenson	League Champs
1954	78–62	4th	Red Marion	Lost League Finals
1955	98–48	2nd	Sheriff Robinson	
1956	79-61	3rd	Dick Whitman	Lost in 1st round
1957	67-68	5th	Dick Whitman	
1958	(14-18); 54-81 overall	--	Jack Paepke	Moved to Las Vegas, Nevada on May 26, 1958; Became the Las Vegas Wranglers
