= Santa Barbara Dodgers =

- 1941–1967; (1941–1942, 1946–1953, 1962–1967); Santa Barbara, California

Minor league affiliations
- Previous classes: Class A (1963–1967); Class C (1941–1942, 1946–1953, 1962)
- League: California League

Major league affiliations
- Previous teams: Los Angeles Dodgers (1963–1967); New York Mets (1962); Brooklyn Dodgers (1941–1942, 1946–1953)

Minor league titles
- League titles: 3 (1941, 1948, 1951)

Team data
- Previous names: Santa Barbara Dodgers (1964–1967); Santa Barbara Rancheros (1962–1963); Santa Barbara Dodgers (1946–1953); Santa Barbara Saints (1941–1942)
- Colors: Dodger blue White
- Previous parks: Laguna Park

The Santa Barbara Dodgers was the main nickname of minor league baseball teams in the Class A California League based in the Pacific Ocean coastal resort city of Santa Barbara, California.

== History ==
The Santa Barbara Dodgers were an affiliate of the Brooklyn Dodgers (in Brooklyn, New York) of the National League and later their successors, the Los Angeles Dodgers (after 1955) from 1941 to 1953 and 1964 to1967. They won the league championships in 1941, 1948 and 1951. The Dodgers entered the California League in 1964 to replace the previous Santa Barbara Rancheros. The Dodgers' home stadium was Laguna Ball Park.

The Santa Barbara Dodgers were plagued by low crowd attendances, averaging only 225 spectators per game. At the end of the 1967 season, the Santa Barbara Dodgers franchise was transferred east to Bakersfield, California. The Laguna Park stadium was demolished in 1970, and replaced by a parking lot, and no professional minor league baseball team has been based in Santa Barbara since.

== Notable alumni ==
=== Baseball Hall of Fame alumni ===
- Sparky Anderson (1953) inducted 2000
- Don Sutton (1965) inducted 1998
- Dick Williams (1947) inducted 2008

=== Notable alumni ===
- Jack Billingham (1964) MLB All-Star
- Paul Blair (1962) 2 x MLB All-Star; 8 x Gold Glove
- Rocky Bridges (1947-1948) MLB All-Star
- Willie Crawford (1964)
- Bruce Edwards (1941) 2 x MLB All-Star
- Alan Foster (1965)
- Jim Gentile (1952) 6 x MLB All-Star
- Hal Gregg (1941) MLB All-Star
- Von Joshua (1967)
- Irv Noren (1946) MLB All-Star
- Wes Parker (1963)
- Larry Sherry (1953) 1959 World Series Most Valuable Player
