= 1993 California League season =

- League: California League
- Sport: Baseball
- Duration: April 8 – September 1
- Games: 136
- Teams: 10

Regular season
- League champions: High Desert Mavericks
- Season MVP: Tim Clark, High Desert Mavericks

Playoffs
- League champions: High Desert Mavericks
- Runners-up: Modesto A's

CALL seasons
- ← 1992 1994 →

The 1993 California League was a Class A-Advanced baseball season played between April 8 and September 1. Ten teams played a 136-game schedule, as the winner of each half of the season qualified for the playoffs, or if a team won both halves of the season, then the club with the second best record qualified for the playoffs.

The High Desert Mavericks won the California League championship, as they defeated the Modesto A's in the final round of the playoffs.

== Team changes ==
- The Reno Silver Sox relocated to Riverside, California and were renamed to the Riverside Pilots. The club began an affiliation with the Seattle Mariners. The team moved from the North Division to the South Division.
- The Visalia Oaks are renamed to the Central Valley Rockies. The club ended their affiliation with the Minnesota Twins and began a new affiliation with the Colorado Rockies. The team moved from the South Division to the North Division.
- The San Bernardino Spirit relocated to Rancho Cucamonga, California and were renamed to the Rancho Cucamonga Quakes. The club ended their affiliation with the Seattle Mariners and began a new affiliation with the San Diego Padres.
- The Salinas Spurs relocated to San Bernardino, California and were renamed to the San Bernardino Spirit. The club moved from the North Division to the South Division.
- The Bakersfield Dodgers move from the South Division to the North Division.
- The High Desert Mavericks ended their affiliation with the San Diego Padres and began a new affiliation with the Florida Marlins.

== Teams ==
1993 California League
Division	Team	City	MLB Affiliate	Stadium
North	Bakersfield Dodgers	Bakersfield, California	Los Angeles Dodgers	Sam Lynn Ballpark
North	Central Valley Rockies	Visalia, California	Colorado Rockies	Recreation Park
North	Modesto A's	Modesto, California	Oakland Athletics	John Thurman Field
North	San Jose Giants	San Jose, California	San Francisco Giants	San Jose Municipal Stadium
North	Stockton Ports	Stockton, California	Milwaukee Brewers	Billy Hebert Field
South	High Desert Mavericks	Adelanto, California	Florida Marlins	Maverick Stadium
South	Palm Springs Angels	Palm Springs, California	California Angels	Angels Stadium
South	Rancho Cucamonga Quakes	Rancho Cucamonga, California	San Diego Padres	Rancho Cucamonga Epicenter
South	Riverside Pilots	Riverside, California	Seattle Mariners	Riverside Sports Complex
South	San Bernardino Spirit	San Bernardino, California	None	Fiscalini Field

== Map of teams ==
North Division South Division

== Regular season ==
=== Summary ===
- The High Desert Mavericks finished with the best record in the regular season for the first time in team history.
- The High Desert Mavericks defeated the Riverside Pilots in a tie-breaking game to finish with the top record in the South Division in the second half of the season.

=== Standings ===
North Division
Team	Win	Loss	%	GB
Stockton Ports	79	57	.581	–
San Jose Giants	79	57	.581	–
Modesto A's	72	64	.529	7
Central Valley Rockies	61	75	.449	18
Bakersfield Dodgers	42	94	.309	37
South Division
Team	Win	Loss	%	GB
High Desert Mavericks	85	52	.620	–
Riverside Pilots	76	61	.555	9
Rancho Cucamonga Quakes	64	72	.471	20.5
San Bernardino Spirit	62	74	.456	22.5
Palm Springs Angels	61	75	.449	23.5

== League Leaders ==
=== Batting leaders ===
Stat	Player	Total
AVG	Tim Clark, High Desert Mavericks	.363
H	Tim Clark, High Desert Mavericks	185
R	Kerwin Moore, High Desert Mavericks	120
2B	Arquimedez Pozo, Riverside Pilots	44
3B	Tim Clark, High Desert Mavericks	10
HR	John Toale, High Desert Mavericks	28
RBI	Tim Clark, High Desert Mavericks	126
SB	Kerwin Moore, High Desert Mavericks	71

=== Pitching leaders ===
Stat	Player	Total
W	Keith Morrison, Palm Springs Angels; William Van Landingham, San Jose Giants	14
ERA	Sid Roberson, Stockton Ports	2.60
CG	Joel Adamson, High Desert Mavericks; Mark Ratekin, Palm Springs Angels; Sid Roberson, Stockton Ports	6
SHO	Joel Adamson, High Desert Mavericks	3
SV	John Pricher, Palm Springs Angels	26
IP	Mike Butler, Palm Springs Angels	179.1
SO	William Van Landingham, San Jose Giants	171

== Playoffs ==
- The High Desert Mavericks won their second California League championship, as they defeated the Modesto A's in five games.

=== Playoff bracket ===
Division finals
N1	Modesto	3
N2	Stockton	1
S1	High Desert	3
S2	Riverside	1

Finals
N1	Modesto	2
S1	High Desert	3

== Awards ==
California League awards
Award name	Recipient
Most Valuable Player	Tim Clark, High Desert Mavericks

== See also ==
- 1993 Major League Baseball season
