= 1994 California League season =

- League: California League
- Sport: Baseball
- Duration: April 7 – September 4
- Games: 136
- Teams: 10

Regular season
- League champions: Modesto A's
- Season MVP: Todd Greene, Lake Elsinore Storm

Playoffs
- League champions: Rancho Cucamonga Quakes
- Runners-up: Modesto A's

CALL seasons
- ← 1993 1995 →

The 1994 California League was a Class A-Advanced baseball season played between April 7 and September 4. Ten teams played a 136-game schedule, as the winner of each half of the season qualified for the playoffs, or if a team won both halves of the season, then the club with the second best record qualified for the playoffs.

The Rancho Cucamonga Quakes won the California League championship, as they defeated the Modesto A's in the final round of the playoffs.

== Team changes ==
- The Palm Springs Angels relocated to Lake Elsinore, California and were renamed to the Lake Elsinore Storm. The club continued to be affiliated with the California Angels.
- The High Desert Mavericks ended their affiliation with the Florida Marlins.

== Teams ==
1994 California League
Division	Team	City	MLB Affiliate	Stadium
North	Bakersfield Dodgers	Bakersfield, California	Los Angeles Dodgers	Sam Lynn Ballpark
North	Central Valley Rockies	Visalia, California	Colorado Rockies	Recreation Park
North	Modesto A's	Modesto, California	Oakland Athletics	John Thurman Field
North	San Jose Giants	San Jose, California	San Francisco Giants	San Jose Municipal Stadium
North	Stockton Ports	Stockton, California	Milwaukee Brewers	Billy Hebert Field
South	High Desert Mavericks	Adelanto, California	None	Maverick Stadium
South	Lake Elsinore Storm	Lake Elsinore, California	California Angels	Lake Elsinore Diamond
South	Rancho Cucamonga Quakes	Rancho Cucamonga, California	San Diego Padres	Rancho Cucamonga Epicenter
South	Riverside Pilots	Riverside, California	Seattle Mariners	Riverside Sports Complex
South	San Bernardino Spirit	San Bernardino, California	None	Fiscalini Field

== Map of teams ==
North Division South Division

== Regular season ==
=== Summary ===
- The Modesto A's finished with the best record in the regular season for the first time since 1982.

=== Standings ===
North Division
Team	Win	Loss	%	GB
Modesto A's	96	40	.706	–
San Jose Giants	74	62	.544	22
Bakersfield Dodgers	69	67	.507	27
Central Valley Rockies	65	71	.478	31
Stockton Ports	54	82	.397	42
South Division
Team	Win	Loss	%	GB
Riverside Pilots	87	49	.640	–
Rancho Cucamonga Quakes	77	59	.566	10
Lake Elsinore Storm	65	71	.478	22
San Bernardino Spirit	48	88	.353	39
High Desert Mavericks	45	91	.331	42

== League Leaders ==
=== Batting leaders ===
Stat	Player	Total
AVG	Raúl Casanova, Rancho Cucamonga Quakes	.340
H	Raúl Casanova, Rancho Cucamonga Quakes	160
R	Charles Gipson, Riverside Pilots	102
2B	Todd Greene, Lake Elsinore Storm	39
3B	Manny Cora, Riverside Pilots; Bill Mueller, San Jose Giants	9
HR	Todd Greene, Lake Elsinore Storm	35
RBI	Todd Greene, Lake Elsinore Storm	124
SB	Scott Richardson, Stockton Ports	49

=== Pitching leaders ===
Stat	Player	Total
W	Jose Prado, Bakersfield Dodgers	15
ERA	Steve Lemke, Modesto A's	2.32
CG	Bryan Harris, Lake Elsinore Storm; Bob Wolcott, Riverside Pilots	5
SHO	Matt Apana, Riverside Pilots	3
SV	Todd Schmitt, Rancho Cucamonga Quakes	29
IP	Bob Wolcott, Riverside Pilots	180.2
SO	Shigeki Noguchi, Central Valley Rockies	161

== Playoffs ==
- The Rancho Cucamonga Quakes won their first California League championship, as they defeated the Modesto A's in four games.

=== Playoff bracket ===
Division finals
N1	Modesto	3
N2	San Jose	0
S1	Riverside	1
S2	Rancho Cucamonga	3

Finals
N1	Modesto	1
S2	Rancho Cucamonga	3

== Awards ==
California League awards
Award name	Recipient
Most Valuable Player	Todd Greene, Lake Elsinore Storm

== See also ==
- 1994 Major League Baseball season
