= 1987 California League season =

- League: California League
- Sport: Baseball
- Duration: April 9 – August 30
- Games: 142
- Teams: 10

Regular season
- League champions: Stockton Ports
- Season MVP: Luis Lopez, Bakersfield Dodgers

Playoffs
- League champions: Fresno Giants
- Runners-up: Reno Padres

CALL seasons
- ← 1986 1988 →

The 1987 California League was a Class A baseball season played between April 9 and August 30. Ten teams played a 142-game schedule, as the winner of each half of the season qualified for the playoffs.

The Fresno Giants won the California League championship, as they defeated the Reno Padres in the final round of the playoffs.

== Team changes ==
- The Ventura County Gulls relocated to San Bernardino, California and were renamed to the San Bernardino Spirit. The club ended their affiliation with the Toronto Blue Jays. The team remained in the South Division.

== Teams ==
1987 California League
Division	Team	City	MLB Affiliate	Stadium
North	Modesto A's	Modesto, California	Oakland Athletics	John Thurman Field
North	Reno Padres	Reno, Nevada	San Diego Padres	Moana Stadium
North	Salinas Spurs	Salinas, California	Seattle Mariners	Salinas Municipal Stadium
North	San Jose Bees	San Jose, California	None	San Jose Municipal Stadium
North	Stockton Ports	Stockton, California	Milwaukee Brewers	Billy Hebert Field
South	Bakersfield Dodgers	Bakersfield, California	Los Angeles Dodgers	Sam Lynn Ballpark
South	Fresno Giants	Fresno, California	San Francisco Giants	John Euless Park
South	Palm Springs Angels	Palm Springs, California	California Angels	Angels Stadium
South	San Bernardino Spirit	San Bernardino, California	None	Perris Hill Park
South	Visalia Oaks	Visalia, California	Minnesota Twins	Recreation Park

== Map of teams ==
North Division South Division

== Regular season ==
=== Summary ===
- The Stockton Ports finished with the best record in the regular season for the first time since 1980.

=== Standings ===
North Division
Team	Win	Loss	%	GB
Stockton Ports	94	48	.662	–
Modesto A's	79	63	.556	15
Reno Padres	76	66	.535	18
Salinas Spurs	64	78	.451	30
San Jose Bees	33	109	.232	61
South Division
Team	Win	Loss	%	GB
Fresno Giants	80	63	.559	–
Bakersfield Dodgers	78	65	.545	2
San Bernardino Spirit	70	72	.493	9.5
Palm Springs Angels	69	73	.486	10.5
Visalia Oaks	68	74	.479	11.5

== League Leaders ==
=== Batting leaders ===
Stat	Player	Total
AVG	Jimmy Lester, Reno Padres	.331
H	Luis Lopez, Bakersfield Dodgers	181
R	Jeff Carter, Fresno Giants	109
2B	Luis Lopez, Bakersfield Dodgers	43
3B	Jeff Carter, Fresno Giants	11
HR	Bill Stevenson, Reno Padres	21
RBI	Gary Sheffield, Stockton Ports	103
SB	Rodney McCray, Reno Padres	65

=== Pitching leaders ===
Stat	Player	Total
W	Tim Burcham, Palm Springs Angels; Mike Pitz, Bakersfield Dodgers	17
ERA	Dave Snell, Salinas Spurs	1.96
CG	Taketo Kanei, San Jose Bees	16
SHO	Taketo Kanei, San Jose Bees; Cork McCorkle, Salinas Spurs; Ed Puig, Stockton Ports	3
SV	Mike Mills, Reno Padres	26
IP	Mike Pitz, Bakersfield Dodgers	205.1
SO	Park Pittman, Visalia Oaks	198

== Playoffs ==
- The Fresno Giants earned a bye in the division finals as they finished the season in first place in the South Division in both halves of the season.
- The division finals was shortened to a best-of-three series.
- The finals were lengthened to a best-of-seven series.
- The Fresno Giants won their ninth California League championship, as they defeated the Reno Padres in seven games.

=== Playoff bracket ===
Division finals
N1	Stockton	0
N2	Reno	2
S1	Fresno	bye

Finals
N2	Reno	3
S1	Fresno	4

== Awards ==
California League awards
Award name	Recipient
Most Valuable Player	Luis Lopez, Bakersfield Dodgers

== See also ==
- 1987 Major League Baseball season
