= 1988 California League season =

- League: California League
- Sport: Baseball
- Duration: April 9 – August 30
- Games: 142
- Teams: 10

Regular season
- League champions: Stockton Ports
- Season MVP: Paul Faries, Riverside Red Wave

Playoffs
- League champions: Riverside Red Wave
- Runners-up: Stockton Ports

CALL seasons
- ← 1987 1989 →

The 1988 California League was a Class A baseball season played between April 9 and August 30. Ten teams played a 142-game schedule, and the winners of each half of the season qualified for the playoffs.

The Riverside Red Wave won the league championship, defeating the Stockton Ports in the final round of the playoffs.

== Team changes ==
- The Salinas Spurs relocated to Riverside, California and were renamed to the Riverside Red Wave. The club ended their affiliation with the Seattle Mariners and began a new affiliation with the San Diego Padres. The team moved from the North Division to the South Division.
- The Fresno Giants ended their affiliation with the San Francisco Giants. The club was renamed to the Fresno Suns. The club moved from the South Division to the North Division.
- The Reno Padres ended their affiliation with the San Diego Padres. The club was renamed to the Reno Silver Sox.
- The San Jose Bees began an affiliation with the San Francisco Giants. The club was renamed to the San Jose Giants.
- The San Bernardino Spirit began an affiliation with the Seattle Mariners.

== Teams ==
1988 California League
Division	Team	City	MLB Affiliate	Stadium
North	Fresno Suns	Fresno, California	None	John Euless Park
North	Modesto A's	Modesto, California	Oakland Athletics	John Thurman Field
North	Reno Silver Sox	Reno, Nevada	None	Moana Stadium
North	San Jose Giants	San Jose, California	San Francisco Giants	San Jose Municipal Stadium
North	Stockton Ports	Stockton, California	Milwaukee Brewers	Billy Hebert Field
South	Bakersfield Dodgers	Bakersfield, California	Los Angeles Dodgers	Sam Lynn Ballpark
South	Palm Springs Angels	Palm Springs, California	California Angels	Angels Stadium
South	Riverside Red Wave	Riverside, California	San Diego Padres	Riverside Sports Complex
South	San Bernardino Spirit	San Bernardino, California	Seattle Mariners	Perris Hill Park
South	Visalia Oaks	Visalia, California	Minnesota Twins	Recreation Park

== Map of teams ==
North Division South Division

== Regular season ==
=== Summary ===
- The Stockton Ports finished with the best record in the regular season for the second consecutive season.

=== Standings ===
North Division
Team	Win	Loss	%	GB
Stockton Ports	94	49	.657	–
San Jose Giants	91	52	.636	3
Modesto A's	54	88	.380	39.5
Fresno Suns	53	89	.373	40.5
Reno Silver Sox	39	103	.275	54.5
South Division
Team	Win	Loss	%	GB
Riverside Red Wave	85	57	.599	–
Visalia Oaks	80	62	.563	5
San Bernardino Spirit	74	68	.521	11
Bakersfield Dodgers	71	71	.500	14
Palm Springs Angels	70	72	.493	15

== League Leaders ==
=== Batting leaders ===
Stat	Player	Total
AVG	Adam Brown, Bakersfield Dodgers	.352
H	Marty Lanoux, Visalia Oaks	185
R	Gregg Ritchie, San Jose Giants	118
2B	Mark Leonard, San Jose Giants	50
3B	Warren Newson, Riverside Red Wave; Tony Triplett, Fresno Suns	7
HR	Warren Newson, Riverside Red Wave	22
RBI	Mark Leonard, San Jose Giants	118
SB	Ted Williams, San Bernardino Spirit	71

=== Pitching leaders ===
Stat	Player	Total
W	Colin Charland, Palm Springs Angels; Tom Meagher, San Jose Giants	17
ERA	Rich Holsman, Riverside Red Wave	2.31
CG	Colin Charland, Palm Springs Angels	12
SHO	Eric Gunderson, San Jose Giants; Dennis Springer, Bakersfield Dodgers	4
SV	Doug Robertson, San Jose Giants	23
IP	Gil Heredia, San Jose Giants	206.1
SO	Paul Abbott, Visalia Oaks	205

== Playoffs ==
- The division finals was lengthened to a best-of-five series.
- The finals were shortened to a best-of-five series.
- The Riverside Red Wave won their first California League championship, as they defeated the Stockton Ports in three games.

=== Playoff bracket ===
Division finals
N1	Stockton	3
N2	San Jose	2
S1	Palm Springs	2
S2	Riverside	3

Finals
N1	Stockton	0
S2	Riverside	3

== Awards ==
California League awards
Award name	Recipient
Most Valuable Player	Paul Faries, Riverside Red Wave

== See also ==
- 1988 Major League Baseball season
