= 1990 California League season =

- League: California League
- Sport: Baseball
- Duration: April 6 – August 29
- Games: 142
- Teams: 10

Regular season
- League champions: Visalia Oaks
- Season MVP: Frank Bolick, Stockton/San Bernardino

Playoffs
- League champions: Stockton Ports
- Runners-up: Bakersfield Dodgers

CALL seasons
- ← 1989 1991 →

The 1990 California League was a Class A-Advanced baseball season played between April 6 and August 29. Ten teams played a 142-game schedule, as the winner of each half of the season qualified for the playoffs, or if a team won both halves of the season, then the club with the second best record qualified for the playoffs.

The Stockton Ports won the California League championship, as they defeated the Bakersfield Dodgers in the final round of the playoffs.

== League changes ==
- The California League was reclassified from Class A to Class A-Advanced beginning in the 1990 season.

== Team changes ==
- The Reno Silver Sox began an affiliation with the Cleveland Indians.

== Teams ==
1990 California League
| Division | Team | City | MLB Affiliate | Stadium |
| North | Modesto A's | Modesto, California | Oakland Athletics | John Thurman Field |
| North | Reno Silver Sox | Reno, Nevada | Cleveland Indians | Moana Stadium |
| North | Salinas Spurs | Salinas, California | None | Salinas Municipal Stadium |
| North | San Jose Giants | San Jose, California | San Francisco Giants | San Jose Municipal Stadium |
| North | Stockton Ports | Stockton, California | Milwaukee Brewers | Billy Hebert Field |
| South | Bakersfield Dodgers | Bakersfield, California | Los Angeles Dodgers | Sam Lynn Ballpark |
| South | Palm Springs Angels | Palm Springs, California | California Angels | Angels Stadium |
| South | Riverside Red Wave | Riverside, California | San Diego Padres | Riverside Sports Complex |
| South | San Bernardino Spirit | San Bernardino, California | Seattle Mariners | Perris Hill Park |
| South | Visalia Oaks | Visalia, California | Minnesota Twins | Recreation Park |

== Map of teams ==
North Division South Division

== Regular season ==
=== Summary ===
- The Visalia Oaks finished with the best record in the regular season for the first time since 1983.

=== Standings ===
North Division
| Team | Win | Loss | % | GB |
|---|---|---|---|---|
| Stockton Ports | 82 | 59 | .582 | – |
| San Jose Giants | 74 | 68 | .521 | 8.5 |
| Reno Silver Sox | 71 | 68 | .511 | 10 |
| Modesto A's | 59 | 82 | .418 | 24 |
| Salinas Spurs | 47 | 93 | .336 | 34.5 |
South Division
| Team | Win | Loss | % | GB |
| Visalia Oaks | 90 | 51 | .638 | – |
| Bakersfield Dodgers | 80 | 62 | .563 | 10.5 |
| San Bernardino Spirit | 77 | 65 | .542 | 13.5 |
| Riverside Red Wave | 64 | 78 | .451 | 26.5 |
| Palm Springs Angels | 62 | 80 | .437 | 28.5 |

== League Leaders ==
=== Batting leaders ===
| Stat | Player | Total |
|---|---|---|
| AVG | Tom Eiterman, Reno Silver Sox | .331 |
| H | Joel Chimelis, Reno / Modesto | 161 |
| R | Pat Listach, Stockton Ports | 116 |
| 2B | Brett Magnusson, Bakersfield Dodgers | 34 |
| 3B | Tim Raley, Stockton Ports | 14 |
| HR | Ken Whitfield, Reno Silver Sox | 24 |
| RBI | Frank Bolick, Stockton / San Bernardino | 102 |
| SB | Tow Maynard, San Bernardino Spirit | 80 |

=== Pitching leaders ===
| Stat | Player | Total |
|---|---|---|
| W | George Tsamis, Visalia Oaks | 17 |
| ERA | Don Rambo, San Jose Giants | 2.19 |
| CG | Steve Maye, Salinas Spurs | 14 |
| SHO | George Tsamis, Visalia Oaks | 3 |
| SV | Rich Garcés, Visalia Oaks | 28 |
| IP | Pat Mahomes, Visalia Oaks | 185.1 |
| SO | Kevin Rogers, San Jose Giants | 186 |

== Playoffs ==
- The Stockton Ports won their eighth California League championship, as they defeated the Bakersfield Dodgers in five games.

=== Playoff bracket ===
Division finals
N1 | Stockton | 3
N2 | San Jose | 1
S1 | Visalia | 2
S2 | Bakersfield | 3

Finals
N1 | Stockton | 3
S2 | Bakersfield | 2

== Awards ==
California League awards
| Award name | Recipient |
|---|---|
| Most Valuable Player | Frank Bolick, Stockton / San Bernardino |

== See also ==
- 1990 Major League Baseball season
