= 1986 California League season =

- League: California League
- Sport: Baseball
- Duration: April 11 – August 31
- Games: 142
- Teams: 10

Regular season
- League champions: Palm Springs Angels
- Season MVP: Ty Dabney, Fresno Giants

Playoffs
- League champions: Stockton Ports
- Runners-up: Visalia Oaks

CALL seasons
- ← 1985 1987 →

The 1986 California League was a Class A baseball season played between April 11 and August 31. Ten teams played a 142-game schedule, as the winner of each half of the season qualified for the playoffs.

The Stockton Ports won the California League championship, as they defeated the Visalia Oaks in the final round of the playoffs.

== Team changes ==
- The Lodi Crushers franchise is re-activated and relocated to Ventura, California and were renamed to the Ventura County Gulls. The club joined the South Division and began an affiliation with the Toronto Blue Jays.
- The Redwood Pioneers relocated to Palm Springs, California and were renamed to the Palm Springs Angels. The club moved from the North Division to the South Division and remained affiliated with the California Angels.
- The Salinas Spurs move from the South Division to the North Division.

== Teams ==
1986 California League
Division	Team	City	MLB Affiliate	Stadium
North	Modesto A's	Modesto, California	Oakland Athletics	John Thurman Field
North	Reno Padres	Reno, Nevada	San Diego Padres	Moana Stadium
North	Salinas Spurs	Salinas, California	Seattle Mariners	Salinas Municipal Stadium
North	San Jose Bees	San Jose, California	None	San Jose Municipal Stadium
North	Stockton Ports	Stockton, California	Milwaukee Brewers	Billy Hebert Field
South	Bakersfield Dodgers	Bakersfield, California	Los Angeles Dodgers	Sam Lynn Ballpark
South	Fresno Giants	Fresno, California	San Francisco Giants	John Euless Park
South	Palm Springs Angels	Palm Springs, California	California Angels	Angels Stadium
South	Ventura County Gulls	Ventura, California	Toronto Blue Jays	Ventura College Ballpark
South	Visalia Oaks	Visalia, California	Minnesota Twins	Recreation Park

== Map of teams ==
North Division South Division

== Regular season ==
=== Summary ===
- The Palm Springs Angels finished with the best record in the regular season for the first time in team history.

=== Standings ===
North Division
Team	Win	Loss	%	GB
Stockton Ports	83	59	.585	–
Salinas Spurs	77	65	.542	6
Reno Padres	73	69	.514	10
Modesto A's	69	73	.486	14
San Jose Bees	65	77	.458	18
South Division
Team	Win	Loss	%	GB
Palm Springs Angels	87	55	.613	–
Visalia Oaks	75	67	.528	12
Ventura County Gulls	75	67	.528	12
Fresno Giants	66	76	.465	21
Bakersfield Dodgers	40	102	.282	47

== League Leaders ==
=== Batting leaders ===
Stat	Player	Total
AVG	Roberto Alomar, Reno Padres	.346
H	Norio Tanabe, San Jose Bees	166
R	Tim Schwarz, Visalia Oaks	102
2B	Ty Dabney, Fresno Giants	36
3B	Rob DeWolf, Stockton Ports	14
HR	Brad Pounders, Reno Padres	35
RBI	Ty Van Burkleo, Palm Springs Angels	108
SB	Rob DeWolf, Stockton Ports	51

=== Pitching leaders ===
Stat	Player	Total
W	Jeff Peterek, Stockton Ports	15
ERA	Mike Christ, Salinas Spurs	2.69
CG	Hisanori Yokota, San Jose Bees	10
SHO	Jeff Peterek, Stockton Ports	3
SV	Randy McCament, Fresno Giants	19
IP	Ed Puig, Reno Padres	178.2
SO	Dennis Cook, Fresno Giants	173

== Playoffs ==
- The Stockton Ports won their seventh California League championship, as they defeated the Visalia Oaks in three games.

=== Playoff bracket ===
Division finals
N1	Salinas	0
N2	Stockton	3
S1	Palm Springs	1
S2	Visalia	3

Finals
N2	Stockton	3
S2	Visalia	0

== Awards ==
California League awards
Award name	Recipient
Most Valuable Player	Ty Dabney, Fresno Giants

== See also ==
- 1986 Major League Baseball season
