= 1989 California League season =

- League: California League
- Sport: Baseball
- Duration: April 7 – August 30
- Games: 142
- Teams: 10

Regular season
- League champions: Stockton Ports
- Season MVP: John Jaha, Stockton Ports

Playoffs
- League champions: Bakersfield Dodgers
- Runners-up: Stockton Ports

CALL seasons
- ← 1988 1990 →

The 1989 California League was a Class A baseball season played between April 7 and August 30. Ten teams played a 142-game schedule, as the winner of each half of the season qualified for the playoffs.

The Bakersfield Dodgers won the California League championship, as they defeated the Stockton Ports in the final round of the playoffs.

== Team changes ==
- The Fresno Suns relocated to Salinas, California and were renamed to the Salinas Spurs.

== Teams ==
1989 California League
Division	Team	City	MLB Affiliate	Stadium
North	Modesto A's	Modesto, California	Oakland Athletics	John Thurman Field
North	Reno Silver Sox	Reno, Nevada	None	Moana Stadium
North	Salinas Spurs	Salinas, California	None	Salinas Municipal Stadium
North	San Jose Giants	San Jose, California	San Francisco Giants	San Jose Municipal Stadium
North	Stockton Ports	Stockton, California	Milwaukee Brewers	Billy Hebert Field
South	Bakersfield Dodgers	Bakersfield, California	Los Angeles Dodgers	Sam Lynn Ballpark
South	Palm Springs Angels	Palm Springs, California	California Angels	Angels Stadium
South	Riverside Red Wave	Riverside, California	San Diego Padres	Riverside Sports Complex
South	San Bernardino Spirit	San Bernardino, California	Seattle Mariners	Perris Hill Park
South	Visalia Oaks	Visalia, California	Minnesota Twins	Recreation Park

== Map of teams ==
North Division South Division

== Regular season ==
=== Summary ===
- The Stockton Ports finished with the best record in the regular season for the third consecutive season.

=== Standings ===
North Division
Team	Win	Loss	%	GB
Stockton Ports	89	53	.627	–
San Jose Giants	81	61	.570	8
Reno Silver Sox	68	74	.479	21
Modesto A's	56	86	.394	33
Salinas Spurs	51	91	.359	38
South Division
Team	Win	Loss	%	GB
San Bernardino Spirit	83	59	.585	–
Bakersfield Dodgers	82	60	.577	1
Visalia Oaks	76	66	.535	7
Riverside Red Wave	64	78	.451	19
Palm Springs Angels	60	82	.423	23

== League Leaders ==
=== Batting leaders ===
Stat	Player	Total
AVG	Ruben Gonzalez, San Bernardino Spirit	.308
H	Eric Karros, Bakersfield Dodgers	165
R	Jarvis Brown, Visalia Oaks	95
2B	Eric Karros, Bakersfield Dodgers	40
3B	Braulio Castillo, Bakersfield Dodgers; Steve Hecht, San Jose Giants; Wiley Lee, Palm Springs Angels; Kerry Shaw, Salinas Spurs	8
HR	Ruben Gonzalez, San Bernardino Spirit	27
RBI	Ruben Gonzalez, San Bernardino Spirit	101
SB	Wiley Lee, Palm Springs Angels	66

=== Pitching leaders ===
Stat	Player	Total
W	Johnny Ard, Visalia Oaks; Joe Slusarski, Modesto A's; Steve Sparks, Stockton Ports	13
ERA	Steve Lienhard, San Jose Giants	1.79
CG	Jeff Whitney, Reno Silver Sox	9
SHO	Willie Banks, Visalia Oaks; Troy Evers, San Bernardino Spirit; Mike Ignasiak, Stockton Ports; Kevin Meier, San Jose Giants	4
SV	Mark Dewey, San Jose Giants	30
IP	Todd Hansen, Riverside Red Wave	198.0
SO	Willie Banks, Visalia Oaks	173

== Playoffs ==
- The Bakersfield Dodgers won their second California League championship, as they defeated the Stockton Ports in three games.

=== Playoff bracket ===
Division finals
N1	San Jose	2
N2	Stockton	3
S1	Bakersfield	3
S2	San Bernardino	1

Finals
N2	Stockton	0
S1	Bakersfield	3

== Awards ==
California League awards
Award name	Recipient
Most Valuable Player	John Jaha, Stockton Ports

== See also ==
- 1989 Major League Baseball season
