= 1995 California League season =

- League: California League
- Sport: Baseball
- Duration: April 6 – September 3
- Games: 140
- Teams: 10

Regular season
- League champions: San Bernardino Spirit
- Season MVP: Adam Riggs, San Bernardino Spirit

Playoffs
- League champions: San Bernardino Spirit
- Runners-up: San Jose Giants

CALL seasons
- ← 1994 1996 →

The 1995 California League was a Class A-Advanced baseball season played between April 6 and September 3. Ten teams played a 140-game schedule, as three teams from each division qualified for the post-season, the winner of each half of the season plus playoff qualifiers.

The San Bernardino Spirit won the California League championship, as they defeated the San Jose Giants in the final round of the playoffs.

== Team changes ==
- The Bakersfield Dodgers ended their affiliation with the Los Angeles Dodgers. The club was renamed to the Bakersfield Blaze.
- The Central Valley Rockies ended their affiliation with the Colorado Rockies. The club was renamed to the Visalia Oaks.
- The High Desert Mavericks began an affiliation with the Baltimore Orioles.
- The San Bernardino Spirit began an affiliation with the Los Angeles Dodgers.

== Teams ==
1995 California League
Division	Team	City	MLB Affiliate	Stadium
North	Bakersfield Blaze	Bakersfield, California	None	Sam Lynn Ballpark
North	Modesto A's	Modesto, California	Oakland Athletics	John Thurman Field
North	San Jose Giants	San Jose, California	San Francisco Giants	San Jose Municipal Stadium
North	Stockton Ports	Stockton, California	Milwaukee Brewers	Billy Hebert Field
North	Visalia Oaks	Visalia, California	None	Recreation Park
South	High Desert Mavericks	Adelanto, California	Baltimore Orioles	Maverick Stadium
South	Lake Elsinore Storm	Lake Elsinore, California	California Angels	Lake Elsinore Diamond
South	Rancho Cucamonga Quakes	Rancho Cucamonga, California	San Diego Padres	Rancho Cucamonga Epicenter
South	Riverside Pilots	Riverside, California	Seattle Mariners	Riverside Sports Complex
South	San Bernardino Spirit	San Bernardino, California	Los Angeles Dodgers	Fiscalini Field

== Map of teams ==
North Division South Division

== Regular season ==
=== Summary ===
- The San Bernardino Spirit finished with the best record in the regular season for the first time in team history.

=== Standings ===
North Division
Team	Win	Loss	%	GB
Modesto A's	78	62	.557	–
San Jose Giants	77	63	.550	1
Stockton Ports	74	66	.529	4
Bakersfield Blaze	58	82	.414	20
Visalia Oaks	58	82	.414	20
South Division
Team	Win	Loss	%	GB
San Bernardino Spirit	85	54	.612	–
Lake Elsinore Storm	82	57	.590	3
Riverside Pilots	72	67	.518	13
Rancho Cucamonga Quakes	68	71	.489	17
High Desert Mavericks	46	94	.329	39.5

== League Leaders ==
=== Batting leaders ===
Stat	Player	Total
AVG	Adam Riggs, San Bernardino Spirit	.362
H	Adam Riggs, San Bernardino Spirit	196
R	Adam Riggs, San Bernardino Spirit	111
2B	Adam Riggs, San Bernardino Spirit	39
3B	Tom D'Aguila, High Desert Mavericks	11
HR	Steve Cox, Modesto A's	30
RBI	Steve Cox, Modesto A's	110
SB	Jason McDonald, Modesto A's	70

=== Pitching leaders ===
Stat	Player	Total
W	Matt Beaumont, Lake Elsinore Storm	16
ERA	Tom Price, San Bernardino Spirit	2.20
CG	Masataka Endo, Visalia Oaks	6
SHO	Rob Bonanno, Lake Elsinore Storm; Heath Murray, Rancho Cucamonga Quakes	2
SV	Carlos Castillo, Lake Elsinore Storm	32
IP	Masataka Endo, Visalia Oaks	186.2
SO	Masataka Endo, Visalia Oaks	178

== Playoffs ==
- The playoffs expanded to three rounds.
- The Division semi-finals were a best-of-three series.
- The San Bernardino Spirit won their first California League championship, as they defeated the San Jose Giants in three games.

=== Playoff bracket ===
Division semi-finals
N1	Modesto	bye
N2	San Jose	2
N3	Stockton	0
S1	San Bernardino	bye
S2	Lake Elsinore	2
S3	Riverside	1

Division finals
N1	Modesto	0
N2	San Jose	3
S1	San Bernardino	3
S2	Lake Elsinore	0

Finals
N2	San Jose	0
S1	San Bernardino	3

== Awards ==
California League awards
Award name	Recipient
Most Valuable Player	Adam Riggs, San Bernardino Spirit

== See also ==
- 1995 Major League Baseball season
