= 1992 California League season =

- League: California League
- Sport: Baseball
- Duration: April 9 – August 30
- Games: 136
- Teams: 10

Regular season
- League champions: Stockton Ports
- Season MVP: Marty Cordova, Visalia Oaks

Playoffs
- League champions: Stockton Ports
- Runners-up: Visalia Oaks

CALL seasons
- ← 1991 1993 →

The 1992 California League was a Class A-Advanced baseball season played between April 9 and August 30. Ten teams played a 136-game schedule, as the winner of each half of the season qualified for the playoffs, or if a team won both halves of the season, then the club with the second best record qualified for the playoffs.

The Stockton Ports won the California League championship, as they defeated the Visalia Oaks in the final round of the playoffs.

== Teams ==
1992 California League
Division	Team	City	MLB Affiliate	Stadium
North	Modesto A's	Modesto, California	Oakland Athletics	John Thurman Field
North	Reno Silver Sox	Reno, Nevada	None	Moana Stadium
North	Salinas Spurs	Salinas, California	None	Salinas Municipal Stadium
North	San Jose Giants	San Jose, California	San Francisco Giants	San Jose Municipal Stadium
North	Stockton Ports	Stockton, California	Milwaukee Brewers	Billy Hebert Field
South	Bakersfield Dodgers	Bakersfield, California	Los Angeles Dodgers	Sam Lynn Ballpark
South	High Desert Mavericks	Adelanto, California	San Diego Padres	Maverick Stadium
South	Palm Springs Angels	Palm Springs, California	California Angels	Angels Stadium
South	San Bernardino Spirit	San Bernardino, California	Seattle Mariners	Perris Hill Park
South	Visalia Oaks	Visalia, California	Minnesota Twins	Recreation Park

== Map of teams ==
North Division South Division

== Regular season ==
=== Summary ===
- The Stockton Ports finished with the best record in the regular season for the first time since 1989.

=== Standings ===
North Division
Team	Win	Loss	%	GB
Stockton Ports	83	53	.610	–
Modesto A's	79	57	.581	4
San Jose Giants	78	58	.574	5
Reno Silver Sox	65	71	.478	18
Salinas Spurs	36	99	.267	46.5
South Division
Team	Win	Loss	%	GB
Visalia Oaks	75	61	.551	–
Palm Springs Angels	72	63	.533	2.5
High Desert Mavericks	71	65	.522	4
Bakersfield Dodgers	68	68	.500	7
San Bernardino Spirit	52	84	.382	23

== League Leaders ==
=== Batting leaders ===
Stat	Player	Total
AVG	Billy Hall, High Desert Mavericks	.356
H	Denny Hocking, Visalia Oaks	182
R	Rich Becker, Visalia Oaks	118
2B	Troy Ricker, Visalia Oaks	41
3B	Rob Lukachyk, Stockton Ports	14
HR	Marty Cordova, Visalia Oaks	28
RBI	Marty Cordova, Visalia Oaks	131
SB	Billy Hall, High Desert Mavericks	49

=== Pitching leaders ===
Stat	Player	Total
W	Brian Hancock, Stockton Ports	14
ERA	Joe Rosselli, San Jose Giants	2.41
CG	Shawn Purdy, Palm Springs Angels	7
SHO	Greg Brummett, San Jose Giants; Dickie Dixon, Visalia Oaks; Mike Hampton, San Bernardino Spirit; Carl Hanselman, San Jose Giants; David Holdridge, Palm Springs Angels	2
SV	Rafael Chaves, High Desert Mavericks	34
IP	Doug Johns, Reno Silver Sox	179.1
SO	Curtis Shaw, Modesto A's	154

== Playoffs ==
- The Stockton Ports won their ninth California League championship, as they defeated the Visalia Oaks in four games.

=== Playoff bracket ===
Division finals
N1	Stockton	3
N2	Modesto	2
S1	Palm Springs	1
S2	Visalia	3

Finals
N1	Stockton	3
S2	Visalia	1

== Awards ==
California League awards
Award name	Recipient
Most Valuable Player	Marty Cordova, Visalia Oaks

== See also ==
- 1992 Major League Baseball season
