= 1991 California League season =

- League: California League
- Sport: Baseball
- Duration: April 10 – August 29
- Games: 136
- Teams: 10

Regular season
- League champions: San Jose Giants
- Season MVP: Matt Mieske, High Desert Mavericks

Playoffs
- League champions: High Desert Mavericks
- Runners-up: Stockton Ports

CALL seasons
- ← 1990 1992 →

The 1991 California League was a Class A-Advanced baseball season played between April 10 and August 29. Ten teams played a 136-game schedule, as the winner of each half of the season qualified for the playoffs, or if a team won both halves of the season, then the club with the second best record qualified for the playoffs.

The High Desert Mavericks won the California League championship, as they defeated the Stockton Ports in the final round of the playoffs.

== Team changes ==
- The Riverside Red Wave relocated to Adelanto, California and were renamed to the High Desert Mavericks. The club remained affiliated with the San Diego Padres.
- The Reno Silver Sox ended their affiliation with the Cleveland Indians.

== Teams ==
1991 California League
Division	Team	City	MLB Affiliate	Stadium
North	Modesto A's	Modesto, California	Oakland Athletics	John Thurman Field
North	Reno Silver Sox	Reno, Nevada	None	Moana Stadium
North	Salinas Spurs	Salinas, California	None	Salinas Municipal Stadium
North	San Jose Giants	San Jose, California	San Francisco Giants	San Jose Municipal Stadium
North	Stockton Ports	Stockton, California	Milwaukee Brewers	Billy Hebert Field
South	Bakersfield Dodgers	Bakersfield, California	Los Angeles Dodgers	Sam Lynn Ballpark
South	High Desert Mavericks	Adelanto, California	San Diego Padres	Maverick Stadium
South	Palm Springs Angels	Palm Springs, California	California Angels	Angels Stadium
South	San Bernardino Spirit	San Bernardino, California	Seattle Mariners	Perris Hill Park
South	Visalia Oaks	Visalia, California	Minnesota Twins	Recreation Park

== Map of teams ==
North Division South Division

== Regular season ==
=== Summary ===
- The San Jose Giants finished with the best record in the regular season for the first time since 1979.

=== Standings ===
North Division
Team	Win	Loss	%	GB
San Jose Giants	92	44	.676	–
Stockton Ports	71	65	.522	21
Modesto A's	68	68	.500	24
Reno Silver Sox	59	77	.434	33
Salinas Spurs	55	81	.404	37
South Division
Team	Win	Loss	%	GB
Bakersfield Dodgers	85	51	.625	–
High Desert Mavericks	73	63	.537	12
Palm Springs Angels	65	71	.478	20
Visalia Oaks	58	78	.426	27
San Bernardino Spirit	54	82	.397	31

== League Leaders ==
=== Batting leaders ===
Stat	Player	Total
AVG	Matt Mieske, High Desert Mavericks	.341
H	Matt Mieske, High Desert Mavericks	168
R	J.D. Noland, High Desert Mavericks	114
2B	Matt Mieske, High Desert Mavericks	36
3B	J.D. Noland, High Desert Mavericks	12
HR	Jay Gainer, High Desert Mavericks	32
RBI	Jay Gainer, High Desert Mavericks	120
SB	J.D. Noland, High Desert Mavericks	81

=== Pitching leaders ===
Stat	Player	Total
W	Rick Huisman, San Jose Giants	16
ERA	Rick Huisman, San Jose Giants	1.83
CG	Timber Mead, Reno Silver Sox; Steve Sparks, Stockton Ports	8
SHO	Rick Huisman, San Jose Giants	4
SV	Gary Sharko, San Jose Giants	31
IP	Rick Huisman, San Jose Giants	182.1
SO	Rick Huisman, San Jose Giants	216

== Playoffs ==
- The High Desert Mavericks won their first California League championship, as they defeated the Stockton Ports in five games.

=== Playoff bracket ===
Division finals
N1	San Jose	1
N2	Stockton	3
S1	Bakersfield	0
S2	High Desert	3

Finals
N2	Stockton	2
S2	High Desert	3

== Awards ==
California League awards
Award name	Recipient
Most Valuable Player	Matt Mieske, High Desert Mavericks

== See also ==
- 1991 Major League Baseball season
