= 1985 California League season =

- League: California League
- Sport: Baseball
- Duration: April 9 – September 1
- Games: 146
- Teams: 9

Regular season
- League champions: Salinas Spurs
- Season MVP: Eric Hardgrave, Reno Padres

Playoffs
- League champions: Fresno Giants
- Runners-up: Stockton Ports

CALL seasons
- ← 1984 1986 →

The 1985 California League was a Class A baseball season played between April 9 and September 1. Nine teams played a 146-game schedule, as the winner of each half of the season qualified for the playoffs.

The Fresno Giants won the California League championship, as they defeated the Stockton Ports in the final round of the playoffs.

== Team changes ==
- The Lodi Crushers take a leave of absence from the league.
- The San Jose Bees move from the South Division to the North Division.

== Teams ==
1985 California League
| Division | Team | City | MLB Affiliate | Stadium |
| North | Modesto A's | Modesto, California | Oakland Athletics | John Thurman Field |
| North | Redwood Pioneers | Rohnert Park, California | California Angels | Rohnert Park Stadium |
| North | Reno Padres | Reno, Nevada | San Diego Padres | Moana Stadium |
| North | San Jose Bees | San Jose, California | None | San Jose Municipal Stadium |
| North | Stockton Ports | Stockton, California | Milwaukee Brewers | Billy Hebert Field |
| South | Bakersfield Dodgers | Bakersfield, California | Los Angeles Dodgers | Sam Lynn Ballpark |
| South | Fresno Giants | Fresno, California | San Francisco Giants | John Euless Park |
| South | Salinas Spurs | Salinas, California | Seattle Mariners | Salinas Municipal Stadium |
| South | Visalia Oaks | Visalia, California | Minnesota Twins | Recreation Park |

== Map of teams ==
North Division South Division

== Regular season ==
=== Summary ===
- The Salinas Spurs finished with the best record in the regular season for the first time since 1976.

=== Standings ===
North Division
| Team | Win | Loss | % | GB |
|---|---|---|---|---|
| Stockton Ports | 82 | 63 | .566 | – |
| Modesto A's | 76 | 68 | .528 | 5.5 |
| Redwood Pioneers | 70 | 76 | .479 | 12.5 |
| Reno Padres | 64 | 81 | .441 | 18 |
| San Jose Bees | 55 | 88 | .385 | 26 |
South Division
| Team | Win | Loss | % | GB |
| Salinas Spurs | 89 | 55 | .618 | – |
| Fresno Giants | 84 | 62 | .575 | 6 |
| Visalia Oaks | 66 | 78 | .458 | 23 |
| Bakersfield Dodgers | 65 | 80 | .448 | 24.5 |

== League Leaders ==
=== Batting leaders ===
| Stat | Player | Total |
|---|---|---|
| AVG | Jim Eppard, Modesto A's | .345 |
| H | Jim Eppard, Modesto A's | 183 |
| R | Bill Wrona, Reno Padres | 107 |
| 2B | Greg Litton, Fresno Giants | 33 |
| 3B | Eric Varoz, Reno Padres | 10 |
| HR | Eric Hardgrave, Reno Padres | 24 |
| RBI | Gene Larkin, Visalia Oaks; Mark McGwire, Modesto A's | 106 |
| SB | Matthew Sferrazza, Stockton Ports | 57 |

=== Pitching leaders ===
| Stat | Player | Total |
|---|---|---|
| W | Charlie Corbell, Fresno Giants | 17 |
| ERA | Jeff Parrett, Stockton Ports | 2.75 |
| CG | Yasuo Kushihara, San Jose Bees | 13 |
| SHO | Charlie Corbell, Fresno Giants; Sherman Corbett, Redwood Pioneers; Randy Ramirez, Salinas Spurs | 3 |
| SV | Ed Puikunas, Fresno Giants | 21 |
| IP | Tom Rentschler, Redwood Pioneers | 193.1 |
| SO | Dennis Livingston, Bakersfield Dodgers | 166 |

== Playoffs ==
- The division finals were extended to a best-of-five series.
- The Fresno Giants won their eighth California League championship, as they defeated the Stockton Ports in five games.

=== Playoff bracket ===
Division finals
N1 | Modesto | 1
N2 | Stockton | 3
S1 | Salinas | 1
S2 | Fresno | 3

Finals
N2 | Stockton | 2
S2 | Fresno | 3

== Awards ==
California League awards
| Award name | Recipient |
|---|---|
| Most Valuable Player | Eric Hardgrave, Reno Padres |

== See also ==
- 1985 Major League Baseball season
