= UC Riverside Highlanders baseball =

UC Riverside Highlanders
- 2026 UC Riverside Highlanders baseball team
- Founded: 1958; 68 years ago
- University: University of California, Riverside
- Head coach: Gregg Wallis (1st season)
- Conference: Big West
- Location: Riverside, California
- Home stadium: Riverside Sports Complex (capacity: 2,500)
- Nickname: Highlanders
- Colors: Blue and gold

College World Series champions
- Division II: 1977, 1982

College World Series appearances
- Division II: 1977, 1981, 1982, 1991

NCAA tournament appearances
- Division II: 1975, 1977, 1981, 1982, 1990, 1991, 1994, 1995, 1996, 1999; Division I: 2003, 2007

Conference regular season champions
- CCAA: 1977, 1981, 1982, 1990, 1991, 1992, 1995, 1996; Big West: 2007

The UC Riverside baseball team is the varsity intercollegiate baseball team of the University of California, Riverside, located in Riverside, California, United States. The program has been a member of the NCAA Division I Big West Conference since the start of the 2002 season. The program's home venue is the Riverside Sports Complex, located on the university's campus. Gregg Wallis will serve as the team's head coach starting with the 2027 season. The program has won two Division II national championships. It has appeared in four Division II College World Series and 12 NCAA tournaments (two in Division I). It has won eight California Collegiate Athletic Association championships and one Big West Conference championship. As of the start of the 2013 Major League Baseball season, 16 former Highlanders have appeared in Major League Baseball.

== History ==
Although the school traces its history to the early 20th century, the University of California, Riverside opened for classes in February 1954. It adopted the Highlanders nickname in a student election held later that year. The varsity baseball program was founded shortly thereafter, beginning play in 1958.

=== Division II ===
Little record exists of the program's early years, though it competed as an Independent in the NCAA College Division (made up of small-school athletic programs) through the end of the 1970 season. Don Edwards, who had assisted in the development of the program prior to its first season, became the program's second head coach prior to the 1960 season. From 1965 to 1968, future UC Irvine and UCLA head coach Gary Adams was an assistant coach under Edwards.

On September 2, 1970, John Lowenstein became the first program alumnus to appear in Major League Baseball, as he debuted for the Cleveland Indians. Lowenstein went on to have a 16-year major league career. While at UC Riverside, Lowenstein had become the first athlete in school history to be awarded an athletic scholarship.

Prior to the start of the 1971 season, the program joined the College Division's California Collegiate Athletic Association (CCAA). It finished well below .500 in its first three seasons in the league. In August 1973, the NCAA reorganized its divisions. Prior to then, the NCAA had competed in two divisions, a large-school University Division and a small-school College Division. Following the reorganization, the University Division became Division I, while the College Division split into Division II and Division III. UC Riverside became a Division II Independent.

Also following the 1973 season, Emporia State coach Jack Smitheran was hired as the program's third head coach. The team's play improved soon after his hiring. In 1975, the Highlanders appeared in their first Division II NCAA tournament. In the West Regional, the team defeated Chapman, 9–8, before being eliminated by Cal State Northridge, 8–1.

In 1977, the program returned to the NCAA tournament and won the Division II National Championship. After winning the CCAA with a 15–9 conference record, the team earned a berth in the West Regional. After advancing through the West Regional with wins over Cal State Northridge and Cal State Hayward, the program played in the Division II College World Series. There, it went 5–1, defeating Eckerd 4–1 in the championship game. Future major leaguers Steve Lubratich and Eric Show played on the championship team.

The Highlanders' home venue, the Riverside Sports Complex, hosted the Division II College World Series from 1980 to 1984. The team qualified for two World Series played on its home field. In 1981, the team won the West Regional, but was eliminated after losing consecutive World Series games to Florida Southern and Cal State Northridge. In 1982, the team again qualified for the NCAA tournament and won the West Regional. In the World Series, the Highlanders won their second Division II National Championship with victories over Longwood, New Haven, and Florida Southern twice. Future major leaguer Calvin Jones played on the 1982 team.

For the seven straight seasons from 1983 to 1989, the program failed to qualify for the NCAA tournament, despite finishing with an above-.500 CCAA record in six of the seven years. In the 1990s, however, the team qualified for seven NCAA tournaments (1990, 1991, 1992, 1994, 1995, 1996, 1999). On one occasion, in 1991, it advanced to the Division II College World Series, the program's fourth appearance. After losing to SIU Edwardsville in its first game, the team won consecutive games over Shippensburg, SIU Edwardsville, and Jacksonville State. In the championship game, however, the team lost to Jacksonville State 5–2. In 1995, the Highlanders entered the West Regional finals with a 43–15 record, but were upset by UC Davis, which had entered the game at 29–30.

=== Division I ===
In February 2000, UC Riverside announced that it would move to Division I in the 2000–2001 academic year and join the Big West Conference in the 2001–2002 academic year. After spending the 2001 season as an Independent, the baseball program played its first Big West season in 2002.

Compared to many of the school's other athletic programs, the baseball program transitioned successfully to Division I. Beginning in 2002, it had an above-.500 overall record in six consecutive Division I seasons. In 2003, the Highlanders finished third in the Big West and received an at-large bid to the NCAA tournament. As the #3 seed in the Palo Alto Regional, the team beat Richmond 10–8 in its opening game. It was then eliminated after losing consecutive games to regional host Stanford and Richmond.

Following the 2004 season, Jack Smitheran retired as the program's head coach. In 31 seasons, Smitheran had a record of 974–729–3 and won two Division II National Championships. Following his retirement, Smitheran worked for the Seattle Mariners as a scouting advisor. He had been inducted into the American Baseball Coaches Association Hall of Fame in 2002, the UC Riverside Hall of Fame in 2004, and had his number #2 retired by the program in 2006. He was replaced by Doug Smith, who had been an assistant coach with the program since the 1983 season.

Prior to the 2007 season, an unused storage building near the Riverside Sports Complex was renovated and converted into the team's home clubhouse. Program alumnus Troy Percival both paid for the improvements and renovated the building himself.

In the 2007 season, the team went 38–21 and won the Big West title, thus receiving an automatic bid to the NCAA tournament as a #2 seed in the Tempe Regional. As in 2003, the team won its opening game, 10–5, against Nebraska. It then lost consecutive games to Arizona State and Nebraska and was eliminated.

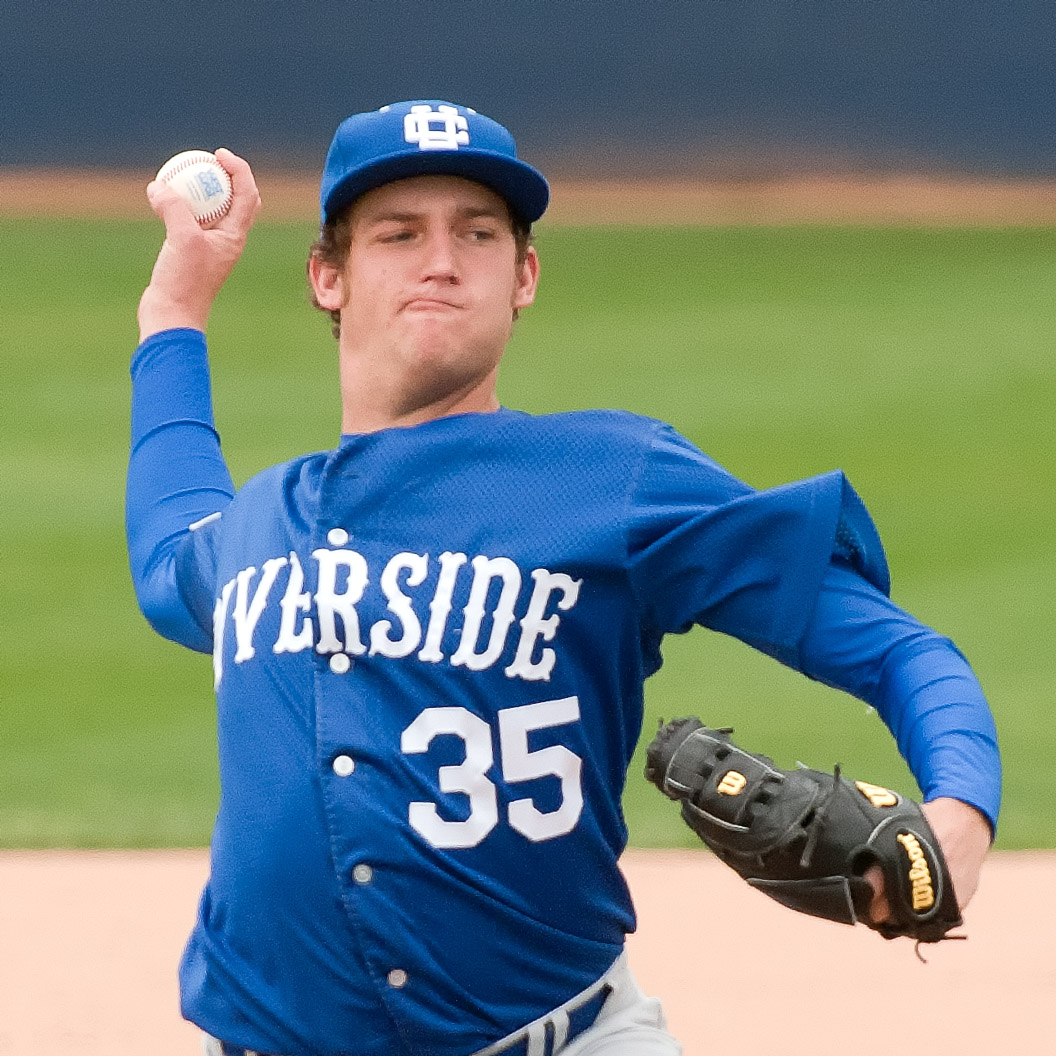
Matt Andriese pitching for the Highlanders in 2011

Smith coached the team through the end of the 2014 season, when he retired. In that seven-year stretch, the program had three winning seasons and finished as high as third in the Big West; it did not qualify for the postseason. In his ten years as head coach, Smith had a record of 282–264. Percival replaced him.

=== Conference affiliations ===
- Independent (College Division) (1958–1970)
- California Collegiate Athletic Association (College Division/Division II) (1971–2000)
- Independent (2001)
- Big West Conference (2002–present)

== UC Riverside in the NCAA Tournament ==
Year	Record	Pct	Notes
2003	1–2	.333	Palo Alto Regional
2007	1–2	.333	Tempe Regional
TOTALS	2–4	.333	

== Venues ==
=== Riverside Sports Complex ===
The program's home venue is the Riverside Sports Complex, located on the university's campus. The facility was renovated in 2007 and has a capacity of 2,500 spectators. In addition to hosting the Highlanders, it hosted the Division II College World Series from 1980 to 1984. It has also been the home venue of minor league baseball teams, hosting the Riverside Red Wave (1988–1990) and the Riverside Pilots (1993–1995).

== Head coaches ==
Jack Smitheran, who coached for 31 seasons and won 974 games, is the program's longest-tenured and most successful coach.

Year(s)	Coach	Seasons	W-L-T	Win %
1958–1959	Paul Robie	2	9–4	.692
1960–1973	Don Edwards	14	67–145–4	.316
1974–2004	Jack Smitheran	31	974–729–3	.572
2005–2014	Doug Smith	10	282–264	.516
2015–2020	Troy Percival	6	111–177	.385
2021–2026	Justin Johnson	6	81–231	.260
Totals	6	69	1524–1550–8	.496

== Yearly records ==
Below is a table of the program's yearly records.

Record table
Season	Coach	Overall	Conference	Standing	Postseason
Independent (College Division) (1958–1970)
1958	Unknown	9–4			
1959	Unknown				
1960	Don Edwards				
1961	Don Edwards				
1962	Don Edwards				
1963	Don Edwards				
1964	Don Edwards				
1965	Don Edwards				
1966	Don Edwards				
1967	Don Edwards				
1968	Don Edwards	17–23			
1969	Don Edwards	17–25			
1970	Don Edwards	2–8			
Independent:		45–60			
California Collegiate Athletic Association (College Division/Division II) (1971–2000)
1971	Don Edwards	17–26–2	7–16–1		
1972	Don Edwards	17–30	7–17		
1973	Lyle Wilkerson	17–33–2	6–17–1		
1974	Jack Smitheran	16–28	6–13		
1975	Jack Smitheran	26–24			West Regional
1976	Jack Smitheran	26–23	7–11		
1977	Jack Smitheran	43–19	15–9		College World Series
1978	Jack Smitheran	22–31	10–11		
1979	Jack Smitheran	33–27–1			
1980	Jack Smitheran	28–21	13–14		
1981	Jack Smitheran	39–23	17–13		College World Series
1982	Jack Smitheran	36–23	19–10		College World Series
1983	Jack Smitheran	31–24	19–11		
1984	Jack Smitheran	28–29–1	16–14		
1985	Jack Smitheran	28–25	18–12		
1986	Jack Smitheran	30–22	17–12		
1987	Jack Smitheran	29–23	18–12		
1988	Jack Smitheran	29–25	17–13		
1989	Jack Smitheran	25–27–1	14–15–1		
1990	Jack Smitheran	39–18	21–9		West Regional
1991	Jack Smitheran	38–25–1	18–12		College World Series
1992	Jack Smitheran	34–23	20–10		West Regional
1993	Jack Smitheran	22–31	14–16		
1994	Jack Smitheran	41–21	18–12		West Regional
1995	Jack Smitheran	43–16	24–8		West Regional
1996	Jack Smitheran	43–14	25–7		West Regional
1997	Jack Smitheran	39–15	20–12		
1998	Jack Smitheran	22–27	14–17		
1999	Jack Smitheran	30–21	21–15		West Regional
2000	Jack Smitheran	30–23	25–13		
CCAA:		921–717–8	446–351–3		
Independent (Division I) (2001–2001)
2001	Jack Smitheran	19–35			
Big West Conference (2002–present)
2002	Jack Smitheran	30–28	10–14	6th	
2003	Jack Smitheran	41–17	14–7	3rd	Palo Alto Regional
2004	Jack Smitheran	33–24	11–10	3rd	
2005	Doug Smith	28–27	11–10	4th	
2006	Doug Smith	29–25	9–12	t-5th	
2007	Doug Smith	38–21	16–5	1st	Tempe Regional
2008	Doug Smith	21–33	14–10	t-3rd	
2009	Doug Smith	33–20	12–12	4th	
2010	Doug Smith	32–23	13–11	3rd	
2011	Doug Smith	29–23	11–13	5th	
2012	Doug Smith	22–32	9–15	8th	
2013	Doug Smith	22–32	10–17	8th	
2014	Doug Smith	26–28	12–12	T-5th	
2015	Troy Percival	15–40	4–20	9th	
2016	Troy Percival	26–29	12–12	5th	
2017	Troy Percival	22–32	8–16	T–7th	
2018	Troy Percival	19–33	7–17	8th	
2019	Troy Percival	20–36	8–16	T–7th	
2020	Troy Percival	9–7	0–0		Season canceled due to COVID-19
Big West:		495–510	191–229		
Total:		1480-1305-8			
National champion Postseason invitational champion Conference regular season champion Conference regular season and conference tournament champion Division regular season champion Division regular season and conference tournament champion Conference tournament champion

== Notable former players ==
The following is a list of notable former Highlanders and the seasons in which they played for the program.

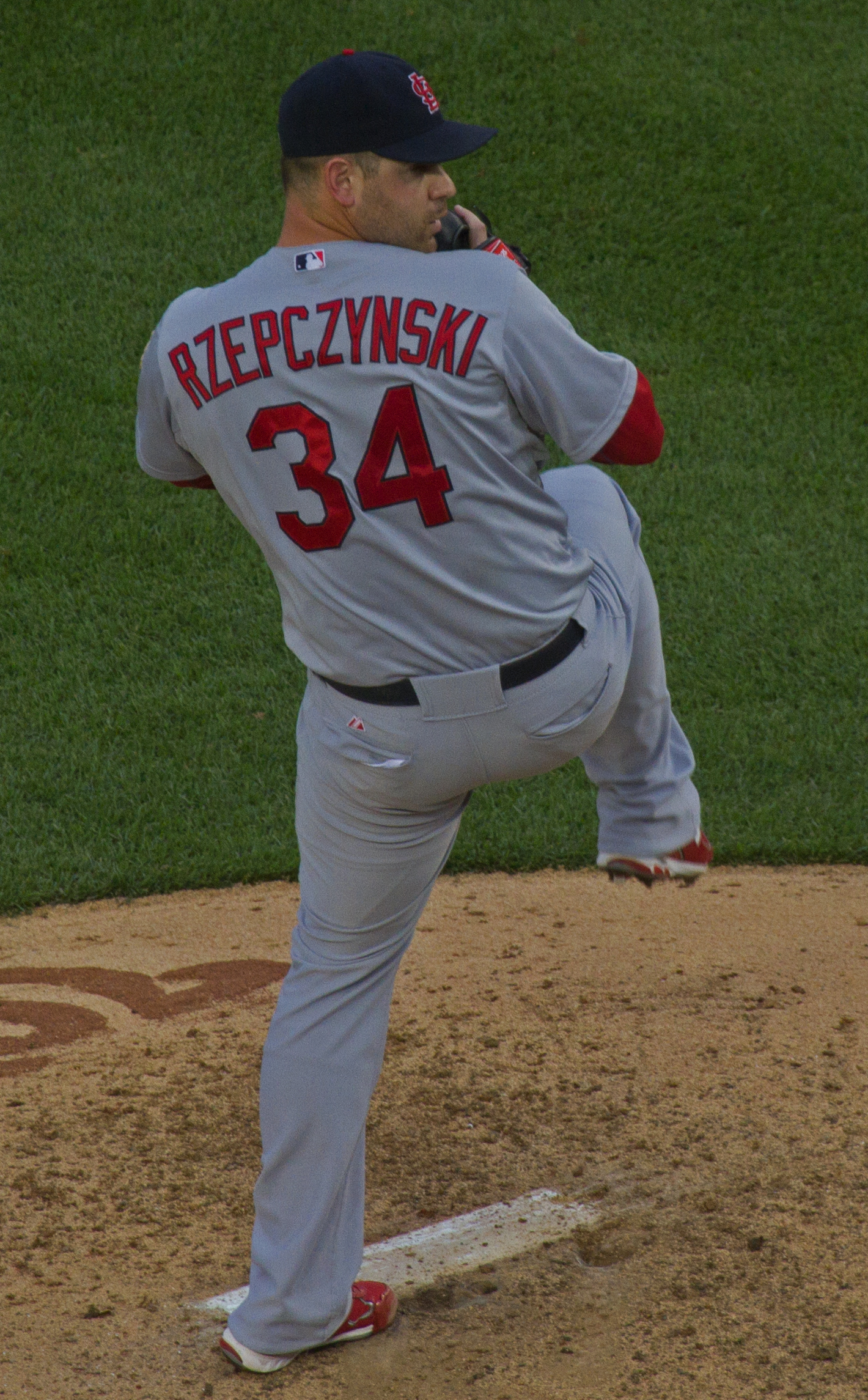
Marc Rzepczynski, while pitching for the MLB's St. Louis Cardinals.

- Kim Allen (1973–1975)
- Stephen Bishop (1991–1992)
- Rob Brantly (2009–2010)
- Anthony Claggett (2003–2005)
- Bobby Clark (1974)
- Andrew Garcia (2005–2008)
- Calvin Jones (1982–1983)
- Joe Kelly (2007–2009)
- John Lowenstein (1966–1968)
- Steve Lubratich (1976–1977)
- Troy Percival (1987–1990)
- Adam Reifer (2005–2007)
- Rick Rodriguez (1981)
- Dan Runzler (2005–2007)
- Marc Rzepczynski (2004–2007)
- Eric Show (1975–1978)
- Chris Smith (2000–2002)
- Joe Strong (1984)
- Curt Wardle (1981)
- Matt Andriese (2008-2011)

=== 2012 MLB draft ===
One Highlander was selected in the 2012 Major League Baseball draft. P Eddie Orozco, selected in the 22nd round by the Chicago Cubs, chose to sign a professional contract.

=== 2013 MLB draft ===
Two Highlanders were selected in the 2013 Major League Baseball draft. The Cleveland Indians selected P Trevor Frank in the 8th round, and the Pittsburgh Pirates selected P Jacob Smigelski in the 39th round. Frank signed with Cleveland, while Smigelski chose to return to Riverside for his senior season.
