= Hide Koga =

Japanese baseball player

- Outfielder
- Batted: Right Threw: Right

debut
- 1962, for the Yomiuri Giants

Last appearance
- 1963, for the Yomiuri Giants

Career statistics
- Batting average: .182
- Home runs: 0
- Runs batted in: 0

Teams
- Yomiuri Giants (1962–1963)

Hidehiko Koga (born September 15, 1939) is a former professional baseball player. He played in Nippon Professional Baseball and in the American minor leagues, while later becoming a minor league manager in the United States and a front office worker and coach in Japan.

== Career ==
Prior to playing professionally, Koga attended Kumamoto Kogyo High School and then Kinki University. He played outfield for the Yomiuri Giants in 1962 and 1963, hitting .182 in 11 at-bats. He played 19 games in Nippon Professional Baseball.

Koga pitched in the United States in 1966 and 1968. In 1966, he pitched for the Decatur Commodores in the San Francisco Giants organization, going 7-8 with a 3.20 ERA in 31 games (15 starts). In 1968, with the Lodi Crushers in the Chicago Cubs system, he went 1-4 with a 4.25 ERA in 26 games (five starts). Overall, Koga went 8-12 with a 3.51 ERA in 59 games (20 starts). He walked 92 batters and allowed 159 hits in 190 innings pitched. At the plate, he hit .288 in 66 at-bats. He played in the Global League, which folded after only two months, in 1969.

From 1990 to 1992, he managed the California League's Salinas Spurs, finishing with losing records each season.
