= 1984 California League season =

- League: California League
- Sport: Baseball
- Duration: April 10 – September 2
- Games: 140
- Teams: 10

Regular season
- League champions: Redwood Pioneers
- Season MVP: Glenn Braggs, Stockton Ports

Playoffs
- League champions: Modesto A's
- Runners-up: Bakersfield Dodgers

CALL seasons
- ← 1983 1985 →

The 1984 California League was a Class A baseball season played between April 10 and September 2. Ten teams played a 140-game schedule, as the winner of each half of the season qualified for the playoffs.

The Modesto A's won the California League championship, as they defeated the Bakersfield Dodgers in the final round of the playoffs.

== Team changes ==
- The Bakersfield Mariners ended their affiliation with the Seattle Mariners and began a new affiliation with the Los Angeles Dodgers. The club was renamed to the Bakersfield Dodgers.
- The Lodi Dodgers ended their affiliation with the Los Angeles Dodgers and began a new affiliation with the Chicago Cubs. The club was renamed to the Lodi Crushers.
- The Salinas Spurs ended their affiliation with the Chicago Cubs and began a new affiliation with the Seattle Mariners.

== Teams ==
1984 California League
Division	Team	City	MLB Affiliate	Stadium
North	Lodi Crushers	Lodi, California	Chicago Cubs	Lawrence Park
North	Modesto A's	Modesto, California	Oakland Athletics	John Thurman Field
North	Redwood Pioneers	Rohnert Park, California	California Angels	Rohnert Park Stadium
North	Reno Padres	Reno, Nevada	San Diego Padres	Moana Stadium
North	Stockton Ports	Stockton, California	Milwaukee Brewers	Billy Hebert Field
South	Bakersfield Dodgers	Bakersfield, California	Los Angeles Dodgers	Sam Lynn Ballpark
South	Fresno Giants	Fresno, California	San Francisco Giants	John Euless Park
South	Salinas Spurs	Salinas, California	Seattle Mariners	Salinas Municipal Stadium
South	San Jose Bees	San Jose, California	None	San Jose Municipal Stadium
South	Visalia Oaks	Visalia, California	Minnesota Twins	Recreation Park

== Map of teams ==
North Division South Division

== Regular season ==
=== Summary ===
- The Redwood Pioneers finished with the best record in the regular season for the first time in club history.

=== Standings ===
North Division
Team	Win	Loss	%	GB
Redwood Pioneers	91	48	.529	–
Modesto A's	83	56	.597	8
Reno Padres	65	74	.468	26
Stockton Ports	64	75	.460	27
Lodi Crushers	58	82	.414	33.5
South Division
Team	Win	Loss	%	GB
Fresno Giants	82	58	.586	–
Bakersfield Dodgers	68	72	.486	14
Salinas Spurs	66	74	.471	16
Visalia Oaks	66	74	.471	16
San Jose Bees	55	85	.393	27

== League Leaders ==
=== Batting leaders ===
Stat	Player	Total
AVG	Rick Coleman, Reno Padres	.351
H	Rick Coleman, Reno Padres	175
R	Gary Jones, Lodi Crushers	111
2B	Rocky Coyle, Modesto A's	33
3B	Renard Brown, Salinas Spurs; Carson Carroll, Visalia Oaks	9
HR	Mark Bonner, Redwood Pioneers	20
RBI	Mark Bonner, Redwood Pioneers	92
SB	Keith Thrower, Modesto A's	89

=== Pitching leaders ===
Stat	Player	Total
W	Bob Kipper, Redwood Pioneers	18
ERA	Bob Kipper, Redwood Pioneers	2.04
CG	Doug Scherer, Modesto A's	10
SHO	Allan Anderson, Visalia Oaks	5
SV	Brian Bargerhuff, Fresno Giants	23
IP	Mike Mills, Reno Padres	194.2
SO	Randy Newman, Salinas Spurs	169

== Playoffs ==
- The Modesto A's won their seventh California League championship, as they defeated the Bakersfield Dodgers in four games.

=== Playoff bracket ===
Division finals
N1	Modesto	2
N2	Redwood	1
S1	Fresno	1
S2	Bakersfield	2

Finals
N1	Modesto	3
S2	Bakersfield	1

== Awards ==
California League awards
Award name	Recipient
Most Valuable Player	Glenn Braggs, Stockton Ports

== See also ==
- 1984 Major League Baseball season
