= Jim Saul =

American baseball player and coach (born 1939)

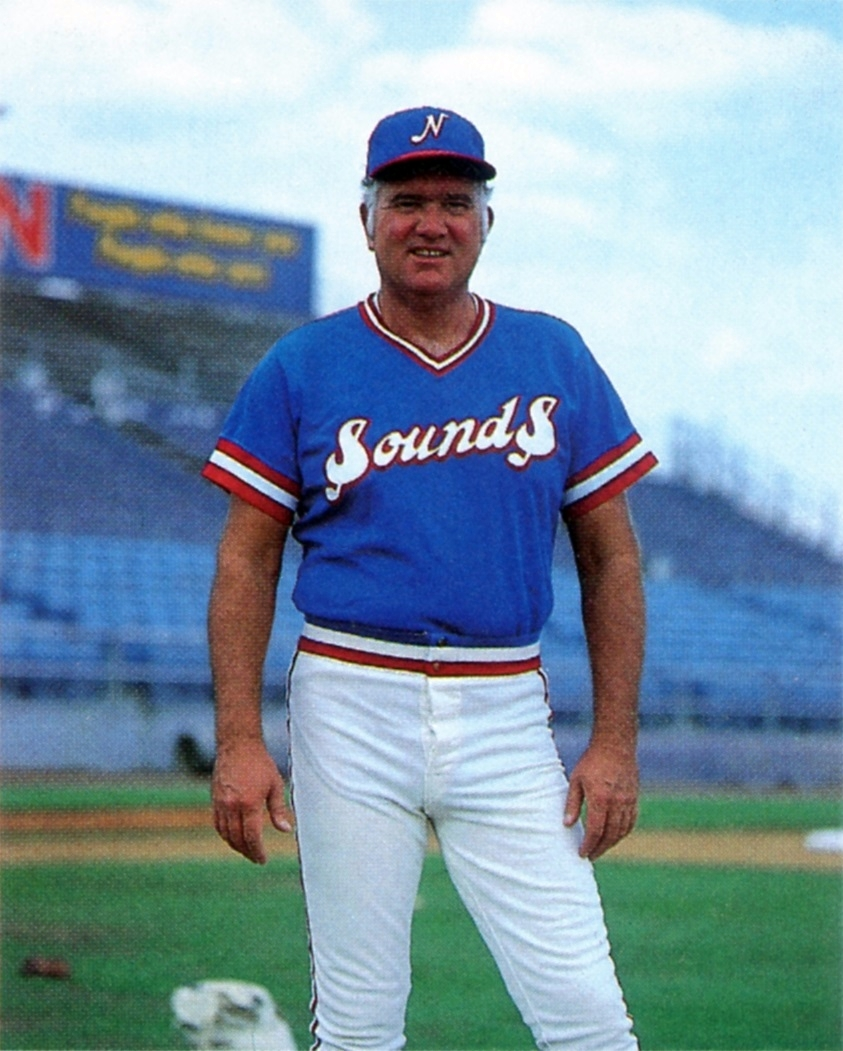
- Saul with the Nashville Sounds in 1983
- Coach
- Born: November 24, 1939 (age 86); Bristol, Virginia, U.S.
- Bats: Left Throws: Right
- Stats at Baseball Reference

Teams
- Chicago Cubs (1975–1976); Oakland Athletics (1979)

James Allen Saul (born November 24, 1939) is an American former professional baseball catcher, manager and coach. The 2008 season marked Saul's 50th season in the game, all but three of them at the minor-league level. In Major League Baseball, Saul coached for three seasons with the Chicago Cubs (1975–76) and Oakland Athletics (1979).

Saul attended East Tennessee State University. As a player, he threw right-handed, batted left-handed, stood 6 ft 3 in (191 cm) tall and weighed 210 pounds (95 kg). His catching career consisted of 14 seasons (1959–72) in the farm systems of the St. Louis Cardinals, Cincinnati Reds, Cubs, Cleveland Indians and California Angels. He was a journeyman who played for 19 different clubs over that span.

He began his managing career in the Angels' organization in 1973, as skipper of the Salinas Packers of the Class A California League. Through 2004, he managed for 22 seasons in the Angels, Cubs, New York Yankees and Atlanta Braves organizations, including five seasons at the Double-A level. Saul's teams won 1,014 games and lost 1,090 (.482).

Saul began coaching for Rookie-level farm teams in 2005. From 2007 to 2009, he was a coach for the Bluefield Orioles, then Baltimore's affiliate in the Appalachian League.
