= Justin Johnson (baseball) =

American baseball player and coach

Biographical details
- Born: January 3, 1977 (age 49)

Playing career
- 1996–1997: Mt. San Antonio College
- Position: Outfielder

Coaching career (HC unless noted)
- ????–2011: Valley View HS
- 2012–2013: Caltech (H)
- 2014: Saint Katherine
- 2015–2020: UC Riverside (H)
- 2021–2026: UC Riverside

Head coaching record
- Overall: 81–231
- Tournaments: NCAA: 0–0

Justin Johnson (born January 3, 1977) is an American baseball coach and former outfielder, who was the head baseball coach of the UC Riverside Highlanders. He played college baseball at Mt. San Antonio College for coach Art Mazmanian from 1996 to 1997. He has also been the head coach of the Saint Katherine Firebirds (2014).

== Playing career ==
Johnson attended Diamond Bar High School in Diamond Bar, California. As a senior in 1995, Johnson was drafted in the 43rd round of the 1995 Major League Baseball draft.

== Coaching career ==
When Troy Percival resigned as head baseball coach at UC Riverside, Johnson was named the interim head coach for the 2021 season. On November 4, 2021, Johnson was promoted to head coach.

== Head coaching record ==
Record table
Season	Team	Overall	Conference	Standing	Postseason
UC Riverside Highlanders (Big West Conference) (2021–2026)
2021	UC Riverside	15–36	12–28	10th	
2022	UC Riverside	8–45	4–29	11th	
2023	UC Riverside	11–41	5–25	11th	
2024	UC Riverside	16–36	6–24	11th	
2025	UC Riverside	16–36	5–25	11th	
2026	UC Riverside	15–37	10–20	11th	
UC Riverside:		81–231	42–151		
Total:		81–231			
National champion Postseason invitational champion Conference regular season champion Conference regular season and conference tournament champion Division regular season champion Division regular season and conference tournament champion Conference tournament champion
