= Doug Smith (baseball coach) =

American former college baseball coach

Biographical details
- Education: UC Riverside '75

Playing career
- 1972–1975: UC Riverside
- Position: C

Coaching career (HC unless noted)
- 1976–1980: Cal Poly Pomona (asst.)
- 1983–2004: UC Riverside (asst.)
- 2005–2014: UC Riverside

Head coaching record
- Overall: 282–264
- Tournaments: NCAA: 1–2

Doug Smith is an American former college baseball coach who retired after the 2014 season. He had been coaching the UC Riverside Highlanders baseball team. He held that position since the 2005 season. Smith was the second coach to lead the Highlanders since their transition to Division I in 2001 and fourth since the establishment of the program in 1958.

== Playing career ==
Smith was a standout catcher at UC Riverside, and was named to the all-conference first team in his senior season of 1975.

== Coaching career ==
Following his playing career, Smith completed a master's degree at California State Polytechnic University, Pomona and served as a part-time assistant coach with the Broncos baseball team for four years. He then pursued a private business venture for three years before returning to his alma mater as an assistant coach in 1983. He rose to the head coaching position in 2005. In his time on the staff at UC Riverside, Smith has coached 34 All-Americans and over 150 players that signed professional contracts. As head coach, the Highlanders won their first Big West Conference title and made their first NCAA tournament appearances at the Division I level. Smith was an assistant for eight Highlander appearances in the Division II NCAA tournament. After struggling through a difficult 2012 season, the Highlanders signed a class of eight players who will begin play in 2014, including six pitchers.

== Head coaching record ==
The following table shows Smith's head coaching record.

Record table
Season	Team	Overall	Conference	Standing	Postseason
Doug Smith (Big West) (2005–present)
2005	UC Riverside	28–27	11–10	4th	
2006	UC Riverside	29–25	9–12	T-5th	
2007	UC Riverside	38–21	16–5	1st	NCAA Regional
2008	UC Riverside	21–33	14–10	T-3rd	
2009	UC Riverside	33–20	12–12	4th	
2010	UC Riverside	32–23	13–11	3rd	
2011	UC Riverside	29–23	11–13	5th	
2012	UC Riverside	22–32	9–15	8th	
2013	UC Riverside	22–32	10–17	8th	
2014	UC Riverside	26–28	12–12	T-5th	
Doug Smith:		282–264	117–117		
Total:		282–264			
National champion Postseason invitational champion Conference regular season champion Conference regular season and conference tournament champion Division regular season champion Division regular season and conference tournament champion Conference tournament champion
