= Arquimedez Pozo =

Dominican baseball player (born 1973)

- Third baseman
- Born: August 24, 1973; Santo Domingo, Dominican Republic
- Batted: Right Threw: Right

Professional debut
- MLB: September 12, 1995, for the Seattle Mariners
- NPB: April 2, 1999, for the Yokohama BayStars
- KBO: April 2, 2000, for the Haitai Tigers

Last appearance
- MLB: September 28, 1997, for the Boston Red Sox
- NPB: October 6, 1999, for the Yokohama BayStars
- KBO: May 28, 2000, for the Haitai Tigers

MLB statistics
- Batting average: .189
- Home runs: 1
- Runs batted in: 14

NPB statistics
- Batting average: .297
- Home runs: 0
- Runs batted in: 9

KBO statistics
- Batting average: .213
- Home runs: 1
- Runs batted in: 8
- Stats at Baseball Reference

Teams
- Seattle Mariners (1995); Boston Red Sox (1996–1997); Yokohama BayStars (1999); Haitai Tigers (2000)
Medals
Men's baseball
Representing Dominican Republic
Central American and Caribbean Games
Bronze medal – third place	1990 Mexico City	Team

Arquimedez Pozo Ortiz (born August 24, 1973) is a Dominican former professional baseball player. He played parts of three seasons in Major League Baseball (MLB) in the mid-1990s for the Seattle Mariners and Boston Red Sox. He also played one season each in Nippon Professional Baseball and the Korea Baseball Organization. Pozo's primary position was third base, and he occasionally played second base.

== Career ==
Pozo was signed as an undrafted amateur free agent by the Seattle Mariners in August 1990. He spent three years in the Mariners' minor league system, advancing from the Class A Short-Season Bellingham Mariners to the Triple-A Tacoma Rainiers. He was the Mariners' minor league player of the year in 1993, leading the all minor leaguers with 44 doubles and was named the California League Player of the Month in July in August while playing for the Riverside Pilots. Baseball America ranked him as the #60 prospect in baseball following that season.

Pozo made his major league debut on September 12, 1995, with Seattle, hitting a pop out in one at bat; it was his only MLB appearance with the Mariners.

After starting the 1996 season with Tacoma, Pozo was traded to the Boston Red Sox for Jeff Manto in July. Pozo spent the next two seasons splitting time between Boston and the Triple-A Pawtucket Red Sox. In his third game with the Red Sox, on July 28, 1996, he hit a grand slam off of Minnesota Twins relief pitcher Eddie Guardado. In 26 MLB games, Pozo batted 14-for-74 (.189) with one home run and 14 RBIs.

After spending the entire 1998 season with Pawtucket, Pozo signed with the Yokohama BayStars of the Japanese Central League for 1999. In 91 games with Yokohama, he batted .297 with nine home runs and 30 RBIs.

In 2000, Pozo played for the Haitai Tigers of the Korea Baseball Organization (KBO), batting .213 in 39 games, and the Tigres del México in the Mexican League, batting .256 in 47 games. He was an outfielder for Tigres. Pozo did not play professionally after the 2000 season.
