= Kerwin Moore =

American baseball player (born 1970)

- Outfielder
- Born: October 29, 1970 (age 55); Detroit, Michigan, U.S.
- Batted: Both Threw: Right

MLB debut
- August 30, 1996, for the Oakland Athletics

Last MLB appearance
- September 29, 1996, for the Oakland Athletics

MLB statistics
- Games played: 22
- At bats: 16
- Hits: 1
- Stats at Baseball Reference

Teams
- Oakland Athletics (1996)

Kerwin Lamar Moore (born October 29, 1970) is an American former professional baseball outfielder. He played for the Oakland Athletics of the Major League Baseball (MLB) in 1996.
