= Luis Lopez (catcher) =

American baseball player (born 1964)

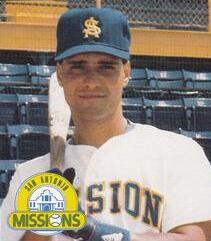
- Lopez with the San Antonio Missions c. 1988
- Catcher / First baseman
- Born: September 1, 1964 (age 61); Brooklyn, New York, U.S.
- Batted: Right Threw: Right

Professional debut
- MLB: September 14, 1990, for the Los Angeles Dodgers
- NPB: April 5, 1996, for the Hiroshima Toyo Carp

Last appearance
- MLB: October 6, 1991, for the Cleveland Indians
- NPB: August 28, 2002, for the Hiroshima Toyo Carp

MLB statistics
- Batting average: .205
- Home runs: 0
- Runs batted in: 7

NPB statistics
- Batting average: .303
- Home runs: 129
- Runs batted in: 510
- Stats at Baseball Reference

Teams
- As player: Los Angeles Dodgers (1990); Cleveland Indians (1991); Hiroshima Toyo Carp (1996–1997); Fukuoka Daiei Hawks (1998); Hiroshima Toyo Carp (2000–2002); As coach: Tohoku Rakuten Golden Eagles (2010)

Career highlights and awards
- 2× Central League Best Nine Award, (1996, 1997); Central League RBI leader 2× (1996, 1997)

Luis Antonio Lopez (born September 1, 1964) is an American former professional catcher and first baseman. He played in Major League Baseball for 41 games for the Los Angeles Dodgers and Cleveland Indians and later in Nippon Professional Baseball.

Lopez's greater success came in Japan, where he played for six seasons between 1996 and 2002. He spent five seasons with the Hiroshima Toyo Carp and played for the Fukuoka Daiei Hawks in 1998. He was twice selected to the Japanese post-season all-star team, the Best Nine, for the Central League in 1996 and 1997. Overall, he batted .303 with 129 home runs over his Japanese career.

He was born to a family of Puerto Ricans. His father, Victor Lopez, ran a supermarket. His mother, Providencia Pagan, was a housewife. He has two older siblings named Victor and Nancy. Baseball runs deep in the family. Lopez’s grandfather Jose Lopez was local sports coach in the family’s hometown of Quebradillas, Puerto Rico.
