= Jeff Peterek =

American baseball player (1963–2023)

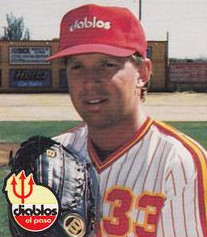
- Peterek in 1988
- Pitcher
- Born: September 22, 1962; Michigan City, Indiana
- Died: October 8, 2023 (aged 61); Niles, Michigan
- Batted: Right Threw: Right

MLB debut
- August 14, 1989, for the Milwaukee Brewers

Last MLB appearance
- September 22, 1989, for the Milwaukee Brewers

MLB statistics
- Win–loss record: 0–2
- Earned run average: 4.02
- Strikeouts: 16
- Stats at Baseball Reference

Teams
- Milwaukee Brewers (1989)

Jeffrey Allen Peterek (September 22, 1962 – October 8, 2023) was an American professional baseball pitcher. He played in part of one season in the major leagues in 1989 for the Milwaukee Brewers, playing seven games. Peterek died in Niles, Michigan, October 8, 2023, at the age of 61.

== Career statistics ==
W	L	PCT	ERA	G	GS	CG	SHO	SV	IP	H	ER	R	HR	BB	SO	WP	HBP
0	2	.000	4.02	7	4	0	0	0	31.1	31	14	14	3	14	16	1	0
