= Adam Riggs =

American baseball player (born 1972)

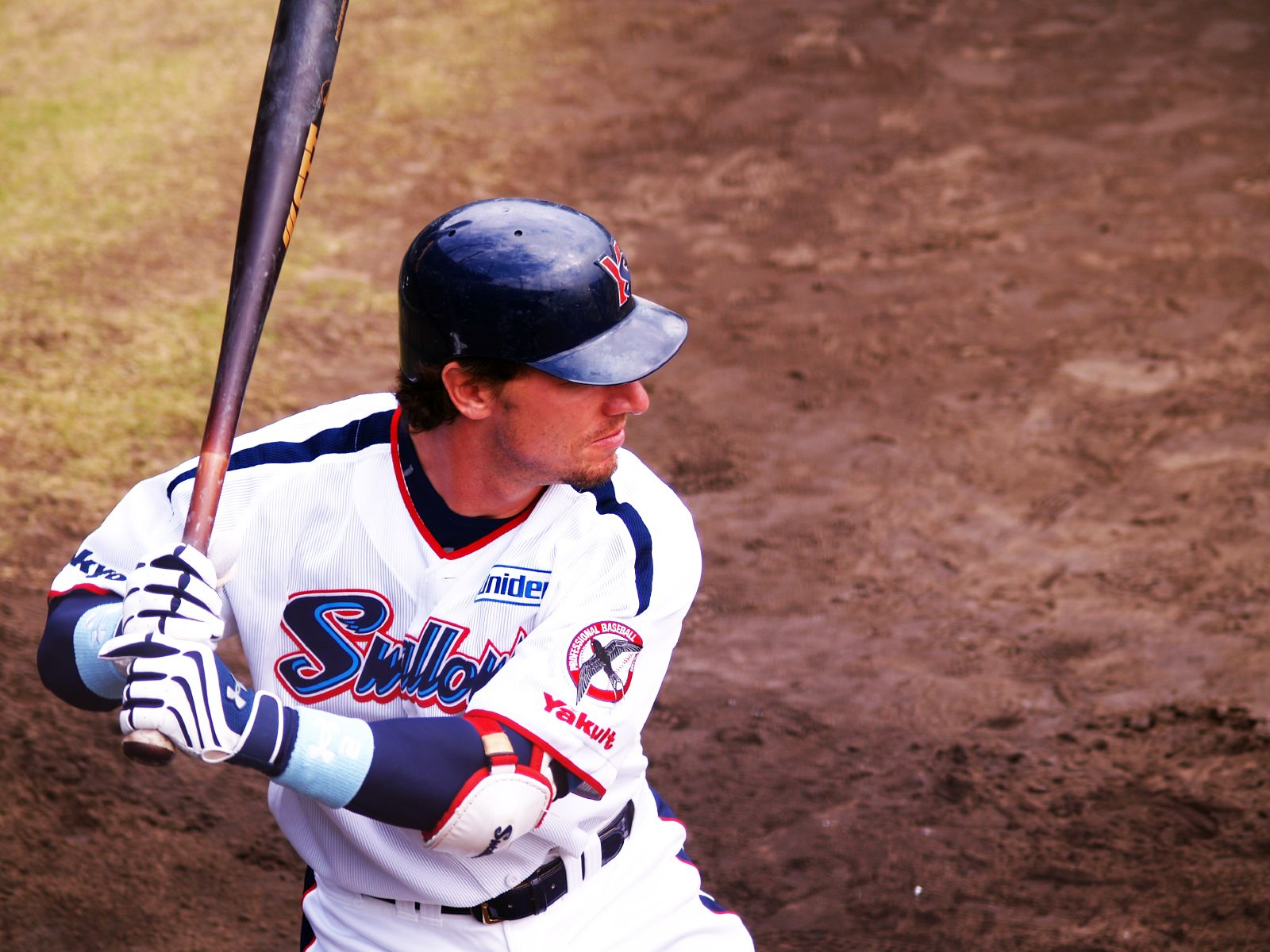
- First baseman
- Born: October 4, 1972 (age 53); Steubenville, Ohio, U.S.
- Batted: Right Threw: Right

Professional debut
- MLB: August 7, 1997, for the Los Angeles Dodgers
- NPB: April 15, 2005, for the Yakult Swallows

Last appearance
- MLB: October 3, 2004, for the Anaheim Angels
- NPB: July, 2008, for the Yakult Swallows

MLB statistics
- Batting average: .216
- Home runs: 3
- Runs batted in: 10

NPB statistics
- Batting average: .281
- Home runs: 59
- Runs batted in: 168
- Stats at Baseball Reference

Teams
- Los Angeles Dodgers (1997); San Diego Padres (2001); Anaheim Angels (2003–2004); Yakult / Tokyo Yakult Swallows (2005–2008)

Adam David Riggs (born October 4, 1972) is an American former professional baseball first baseman. He played parts of four years in Major League Baseball, but is better known for the four seasons he spent with the Tokyo Yakult Swallows of the Japanese Central League.

A native of Byram Township, New Jersey, he attended Lenape Valley Regional High School in Stanhope, New Jersey, and is an alumnus of the County College of Morris and the University of South Carolina Aiken.

== Baseball career ==
Adam Riggs played for the USC Aiken Pacers for the 1993 and 1994 seasons. Drafted by the Los Angeles Dodgers in the 22nd round of the 1994 Major League Baseball June Amateur Draft, Riggs made his Major League Baseball debut with the Dodgers on August 7, 1997.

Riggs gained notoriety after a 2003 game with the Anaheim Angels in which he wore a uniform which featured the team name misspelled as "Angees", which appeared in Sports Illustrated, and was also nominated for a This Year in Baseball Award for Most Bizarre Moment in 2003.

In 2005 he signed with the Yakult Swallows of Japan's Central League and played with them until July 2008.

== Mitchell Report ==
On December 13, 2007, Riggs was included in the Mitchell Report, in which it was alleged that he used steroids during his career. In the report, Kirk Radomski states that Riggs bought human growth hormone, clenbuterol, and Winstrol from him between July 10, 2003, to November 30, 2005. Photocopies of five checks from Riggs to Radomski are included in the report to substantiate Radomski's accusations. Radomski claims Riggs was referred to him by Paul Lo Duca. Riggs declined to meet with the Mitchell investigators but provided a letter from his lawyer stating that he "never tested positive for improper substances".

From 2005 to 2008, Riggs never tested positive for performance-enhancing drugs while playing in Japan for the Tokyo Yakult Swallows under the Olympic testing standards used by Nippon Professional Baseball.
