= Eric Hardgrave =

- First baseman/Designated hitter
- Born: October 5, 1960 (age 65); Fresno, California, U.S.
- Bats: Right Throws: Right
- Stats at Baseball Reference

Eric Hardgrave (born October 5, 1960) is an American former professional baseball player who was an All-American college baseball player at Stanford University. He is currently a managing partner of the Silicon Valley–based venture capital firm, Acuity Ventures.

== High school and college ==
Hardgrave played first base for Bullard High School in Fresno, California. He was selected with the 59th pick of the 1979 Major League Baseball draft by the Cleveland Indians. Hardgrave did not sign with the Indians, opting to attend Stanford University, where he played for four seasons with the Cardinal. In his senior year of 1983, Hardgrave had a .360 batting average, hit 24 home runs, and batted in 81 runs, leading the Cardinal to its second straight College World Series appearance for the first time in history. That year, Hardgrave was named a first team All-American and the Pac-10 player of the year. He graduated with a degree in Economics from Stanford, and in 2005, was named to the Stanford Athletic Hall of Fame.

== Professional baseball ==
Hardgrave was drafted by the San Diego Padres with the 142nd pick of the 1983 Major League Baseball draft, and played for the team's minor league affiliates in Spokane, Reno, and Beaumont. He played for the affiliates of the Milwaukee Brewers and Detroit Tigers before retiring from baseball in 1988.

== Venture capitalist ==
Hardgrave co-founded Sand Hill Capital in the 1990s, and is currently a managing partner at the venture capital fund Acuity Ventures.
