= Riverside Pilots =

- 1993–1995; Riverside, California
Team logo
Cap insignia

Minor league affiliations
- Class: Class A-Advanced (1993–1995)
- League: California League (1993–1995)

Major league affiliations
- Team: Seattle Mariners (1993–1995)

Minor league titles
- Division titles (1): 1994

Team data
- Name: Riverside Pilots (1993–1995)
- Colors: Navy blue, silver, dark teal
- Ballpark: Riverside Sports Center (1993–1995)

The Riverside Pilots were a Minor League Baseball team in Riverside, California. They were a Class A-Advanced team that played in the California League, and were a farm team of the Seattle Mariners. In spite of making the playoffs each year of its existence, poor attendance plagued the franchise throughout its tenure. The Pilots finished last in the league in attendance for three consecutive seasons. The franchise was moved to Lancaster, for the 1996 season as the Lancaster JetHawks.

== History ==
Riverside had been without professional baseball since the departure of the Red Wave in 1990. The Reno Silver Sox, who were in a contentious relationship with the city leaders resulting from poor conditions at Moana Stadium and disputed bills were a prospect for relocation. Offering a newer facility that had recently received a significant renovation, Riverside was seen as an upgrade to the Silver Sox. The Silver Sox, who were in a contentious relationship with the city leaders resulting from poor conditions at Moana Stadium and disputed bills. The franchise inked a four year played development contract with the Seattle Mariners. On December 2, 1992 it was officially announced that the franchise would relocate to Riverside.

In their inaugural game the Pilots would open on the road against Angels affiliate Palm Springs. In a game with twenty-four combined hits, the Pilots won 8-7 to record their first victory. Under the league's split season format the Pilots went 36-32 and 40-28 respectively for a record of 76-60 overall. Riverside tied with High Desert for the second half to set up a one game play-off to determine home field advantage for the best of five series division play-off. Riverside dropped the play-off giving High Desert home field for the first three games in the series. The eventually California League champion Mavericks would take the series from the Pilots in four games.

Dave Myers returned a chief pilot for the 1994 campaign. Riverside posted a record of 87-49 on the year to win both halves of the season. The Pilots faced Rancho Cucamonga in the south division play-off series. Riverside would suffer a similar fate as the previous season with a post season exit in four games. Despite another successful season in the win-loss column and consecutive post season appearances, the club finished last in league attendance tallying just over thirty-five thousand in sixty-seven home dates. The Pilots ownership attributed the poor attendance to the inability to sell beer at the games.

Entering the 1995 season there were rumblings that the Pilots were poised for relocation. The California League had witnessed a boon of new facilities in recent years. Other communities including Lancaster and Ventura sought the opportunity to bring professional baseball to their own backyard. Dave Brundage, was tabbed as manager for the Pilots. With the season still in progress it was announced that the club would be relocating to Lancaster, who had approved a new $7 million stadium. Riverside compiled a 72-67 record to finish third in the league's southern division. Under the California Leagues's new expanded play-off, Riverside earned a wild card berth. The Pilots met southern division second half winner, Lake Elsinore, in a three game set. The Pilots existence came to a close with a loss the Lake Elsinore in the decisive wild card game.

Upon relocating to Lancaster the franchise rebranded to become the Lancaster JetHawks.

== Team identity ==
Upon relocating the franchise held a name the team contest. With over 2,000 entries, the club selected the name Riverside Pilots. "It's got both that nautical and aeronautical feel to it," said General Manager Jack Patton. The team adopted a color scheme mirroring that of their parent club, the Seattle Mariners.

== Ballpark ==
The Riverside Sports Center served as the Pilots' primary ballpark. Now known as the Riverside Sports Complex, the facility is the home of UC Riverside baseball.

== Season-by-season record ==
Season	PDC	Division	Finish	Wins	Losses	Win%	Postseason	Manager	Attendance
Riverside Pilots
1993	SEA	South	2nd	76	61	.555	Lost division finals to High Desert Mavericks 1-3	Dave Myers	68,821
1994	SEA	South	1st	87	49	.640	Lost division finals to Rancho Cucamonga Quakes 1-3	Dave Myers	85,358
1995	SEA	South	3rd	72	67	.518	Lost division semi-finals to Lake Elsinore Storm 1-2	Dave Brundage	56,590

Division winner	League champions

== List of Riverside Pilots players in MLB ==
All players are listed in alphabetical order by their surname, with the year(s) they played for Riverside in parentheses.

- Rafael Carmona (1994)
- Dean Crow (1995)
- José Cruz Jr. (1995)
- John Cummings (1994)
- Tim Davis (1993)
- Ryan Franklin (1994)
- Charles Gipson (1994)
- George Glinatsis (1993–1994)
- Giomar Guevara (1995)
- Tim Harikkala (1994)
- Brett Hinchcliffe (1995)
- Raúl Ibañez (1995)
- Kevin King (1993)
- Derek Lowe (1993)
- Trey Moore (1995)
- Julio Peguero (1994)
- Arquimedez Pozo (1993)
- Desi Relaford (1994)
- Steve Rosenberg (1993)
- Marino Santana (1995)
- Andy Sheets (1993–1994)
- Mac Suzuki (1995)
- Ron Villone (1993)
- Chris Widger (1993)
- Bob Wolcott (1994)
- Kerry Woodson (1994)

== Notes of interest ==
- Comedian Billy Crystal had a limited ownership of the Riverside Pilots, at time.
- Dave Brundage got his coaching start with Riverside in 1995.

Preceded by Reno Silver Sox	California League franchise 1993-1995	Succeeded by Lancaster JetHawks
