= Frank Bolick =

American baseball player (born 1966)

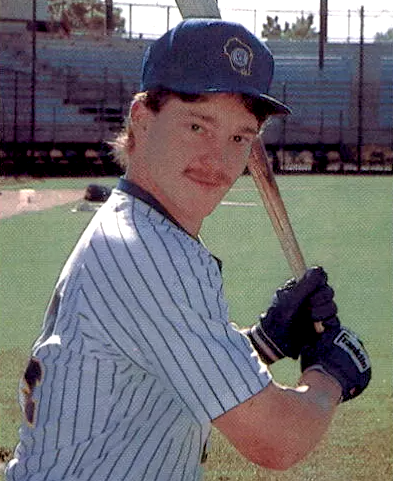
- Bolick with the Beloit Brewers c. 1988
- Infielder
- Born: June 28, 1966 (age 59); Ashland, Pennsylvania, U.S.
- Batted: Switch Threw: Right

Professional debut
- MLB: April 5, 1993, for the Montreal Expos
- NPB: April 14, 1999, for the Chiba Lotte Marines

Last appearance
- MLB: June 3, 1998, for the Anaheim Angels
- NPB: September 24, 2002, for the Chiba Lotte Marines

MLB statistics
- Batting average: .202
- Home runs: 5
- Runs batted in: 26

NPB statistics
- Batting average: .266
- Home runs: 92
- Runs batted in: 288
- Stats at Baseball Reference

Teams
- Montreal Expos (1993); Anaheim Angels (1998); Chiba Lotte Marines (1999–2002)

Frank Charles Bolick (born June 28, 1966) is an American former Major League Baseball player from Ashland, Pennsylvania. He was an infielder for the Montreal Expos and Anaheim Angels. He also played four seasons in Japan with the Chiba Lotte Marines. He threw right-handed, and was a switch hitter.

== Early career ==
Bolick played high school baseball at Mount Carmel Area and was drafted out of high school by the Montreal Expos in 1985, but did not sign, instead choosing to play college baseball at Georgia Tech. He was drafted again by the Milwaukee Brewers in 1987, and signed with them on June 12 of that year.

== Professional career ==
=== North America ===
Bolick made his way through various minor league organizations before making his major league debut in 1993 with the Expos. He played in 95 games that year, hitting 4 home runs and 24 RBIs with a .211 batting average. He spent several more years in the minors with five more organizations before being promoted to the majors again in 1998 with the Anaheim Angels. He played 21 games before being released at the end of the season.

=== Japan ===
Bolick was signed by the Chiba Lotte Marines of the Japanese Pacific League in 1999. The Marines hoped he would emerge as the new cleanup hitter that the team badly needed, but he did not hit well in pre-season games, and began the season in the minors. However, he hit a home run in his first at-bat in April, and emerged as the team's best power hitter by the end of his first season. The Marines compiled a 22-2-1 record in games where Bolick hit a home run, and a cult belief emerged among Marines fans that the team would never lose as long as Bolick hit a home run. However, he was also one at-bat away from tying the league record for consecutive at-bats without a hit, going 0 for 51 at the end of the season. He finished the season with 26 home runs and 61 RBIs.

Bolick's production increased in his second season in Japan, where he hit 29 home runs with 102 RBIs in 125 games. He played his best season in 2001, hitting 31 home runs and 101 RBIs with a .279 batting average. He also drew 107 walks; the Japanese single-season record, and won the Best Nine Award for designated hitter. He played an epic game on July 9, 2001, against the Fukuoka Daiei Hawks; the Marines were 3 runs behind in the 10th inning, and Bolick finished the game with a walk-off grand slam off closer Rodney Pedraza.

A new strike zone was established in Nippon Professional Baseball in 2002, and Bolick was unable to continue his hitting prowess, ending the season with a .204 batting average. He was demoted to the minors after injuring his left knee, and was released in August. He left Japan on September 28, and a large number of Marines fans showed up at Narita International Airport to bid him farewell.
