= Charles Gipson =

American baseball player (born 1972)

- Outfielder
- Born: December 16, 1972 (age 53); Orange, California, U.S.
- Batted: Right Threw: Right

MLB debut
- March 31, 1998, for the Seattle Mariners

Last MLB appearance
- October 2, 2005, for the Houston Astros

MLB statistics
- Batting average: .237
- Hits: 76
- Runs batted in: 30
- Stats at Baseball Reference

Teams
- Seattle Mariners (1998–2002); New York Yankees (2003); Tampa Bay Devil Rays (2004); Houston Astros (2005)

Charles Wells Gipson Jr. (born December 16, 1972) is an American former professional baseball outfielder. He played 8 seasons in Major League Baseball (MLB) for the Seattle Mariners (1998–2002), New York Yankees (2003), Tampa Bay Devil Rays (2004), and Houston Astros (2005).

== Playing career ==
Gipson attended Loara High School in Anaheim, California, where he also played football, basketball, and wrestling. He then attended Cypress College in Orange County, California, where he also played football. He received scholarship offers from Division I football teams but chose to pursue baseball.

=== Seattle Mariners ===
The Seattle Mariners drafted Gipson in the 63rd round of the 1991 MLB draft. He waited almost a year before signing with Seattle and played only 32 games in 1992 with the Arizona League Mariners. In 1993, Gipson set a Midwest League record by getting hit by 27 pitches with the Appleton Foxes. Mike Kinkade broke the record in 1996. In 1994, Gipson was a California League All-Star and named the best defensive outfielder by the league's managers while playing for the Riverside Pilots. He also played for the Mariners in the 1994 in-season exhibition Hall of Fame Game in Cooperstown, New York.

Gipson was a replacement player in spring training in 1995, during the ongoing strike. He said he chose to cross the picket line to gain the attention of Mariners manager Lou Piniella. Piniella said Gipson needed to work on his hitting. Gipson returned to the minors after the strike ended. Because he chose to be a replacement player, Gipson could not join the MLB Players Association. In 2002, Gipson said he was less informed about the players' union in 1995, had tried to join the union, and supported the players in the potential upcoming strike.

Gipson debuted with the Mariners on March 31, 1998, coming in as a defensive replacement on opening day. He was mostly used off the bench, not starting a game until June 19, his 16th game in the majors. After the 1998 season, Gipson worked with his father's longtime friend, former MLB player Garry Templeton, to improve his hitting.

In 2000, Gipson had his most productive offensive season, batting .310 with 4 walks and two extra base hits in 59 games. He also made his postseason debut in the American League Championship Series, again as a defensive replacement. He credited Rickey Henderson with helping improve his approach as a leadoff hitter. After the season, Gipson said he was robbed at gunpoint while in Venezuela, playing for Cardenales de Lara. His offense plummeted the next season. The out-of-options utility player appeared a career high 94 games in the majors but hit .210. Piniella said Gipson improved his hitting that season, but "the only problem is, he has more room for improvement." On September 10, Gipson made a diving catch in left field to finish a Mariners' victory.

In a 2002 game in Seattle, Gipson failed to catch a foul ball hit out of play. However, fans grabbed him and the ball, putting the ball back in his glove. Gipson held his glove up to the umpire, but umpire ruled that Gipson had not caught it.

=== Other MLB teams ===
Gipson signed with the Chicago Cubs in January 2003 but the team released him before the season started.

On April 7, 2003, the New York Yankees signed Gipson. He had a pinch-hit, go-ahead, bases loaded, 11th inning walk in a win over the New York Mets on June 22, his last game with the Yankees.

Gipson played in five games for the Tampa Bay Devil Rays in 2004, going 2-for-4 with one run and one stolen base. In 2005, Gipson played in 19 games for the Houston Astros, batting 2-for-11, his last season in professional baseball.

As of the end of the 2006 season, he was one of only seven players to have played at least 100 games and have more games played than at-bats. Despite being used as a pinch runner more than 100 times, Gipson was not very adept at stealing bases, stealing 16 stolen bases while getting caught 11 times.

== Personal life ==
As of 2025, Gipson is the athletics director and golf coach at Xavier Academy, a private middle and high school in Houston, Texas.

Gipson's father, also named Charles Gipson, played in minor league baseball in 1971 and 1972 before returning as a pitcher in 1977.

After retiring, Gipson joined the Major League Baseball Players Alumni Association.
