= Ventura County Gulls =

- 1986; Ventura, California

Minor league affiliations
- Class: Class A-Advanced (1986)
- League: California League (1986)

Major league affiliations
- Team: Toronto Blue Jays (1986)

Team data
- Name: Ventura County Gulls (1986)
- Colors: Royal blue, powder blue, white
- Ballpark: Ventura College Ballpark (1986)
- General manager: Jim Biby

The Ventura County Gulls were a minor league baseball team in Ventura, California. They were a Class A-Advanced team that played in the California League, and were a farm team of the Toronto Blue Jays for the franchise's only year as the Gulls. They played all of their home games at the baseball field at Ventura College. In spite of the fact the Gulls' roster featured 14 future Major League Baseball players in their lone year, Ventura County did not make the playoffs; instead, they lost a tiebreaker to the Visalia Oaks. Coupled with the poor attendance mark by the Gulls, this proved too much to bear for the struggling franchise. Prior to the 1987 season, the Ventura County Gulls were sold and moved to San Bernardino, California, where the franchise became the San Bernardino Spirit.

Due to a lack of lights at Ventura College's baseball stadium, the Gulls were one of the few minor league teams (if not the only team) in the nation to have every home game played in the afternoon. This major restriction put Ventura County last in the California League in total home attendance (with 38,818) and was the main reason why the Gulls stayed in Ventura for only one season.

== Team identity ==
The team conducted a survey for a team name at the Ventura County Fair in 1985. Over 200 different names were submitted. The owners, who felt it fitting for the community's coastal location, selected the Gulls. Local artist Chris Martinez designed the Gulls logos. "The Gull in Flight logo is used on the Gulls' office stationery and will be on the player's uniform caps. The Batting Gull has been used for promotional flyers and will be featured on various Gulls memorabilia being sold at the ballpark. Both logos typify the characteristics of the Gull. The 'flight' logo depicts the beauty and face of a bird in flight; while the 'batting gull' shows the scrappy and competitive nature of this sea bird. It is only fitting a beautiful coastal town such as Ventura would adopt the name 'Gulls' for its team." The Gulls would adopt the color scheme of their parent club, the Blue Jays.

== Major league alumni ==
All players are listed in alphabetical order by their surname, with the year they played for the Ventura County Gulls in parentheses.

- Kevin Batiste (1986)
- Gerónimo Berroa (1986)
- Domingo Martinez (1986)
- José Mesa (1986)
- Enrique Burgos (1986)
- Francisco Cabrera (1986)
- Jeff Musselman (1986)
- Greg Myers (1986)
- Carlos Diaz (1986)
- Rob Ducey (1986)
- Todd Stottlemyre (1986)
- David Wells (1986)
- Dave Walsh (1986)
- Eric Yelding (1986)

Team manager was Glenn Ezell and the pitching coach was Jim Colborn.

== Season-by-season record ==
Season	PDC	Division	Finish	Wins	Losses	Win%	Postseason	Manager	Attendance
Ventura County Gulls
1986	TOR	South	3rd	75	67	.528		Glenn Ezell	38,868

Preceded by Lodi Crushers	California League franchise 1986	Succeeded by San Bernardino Spirit
