= Riverside Red Wave =

- 1988–1990; Riverside, California

Minor league affiliations
- Class: Class A-Advanced (1990); Class A (1988–1989)
- League: California League (1988–1990)

Major league affiliations
- Team: San Diego Padres (1988–1990)

Minor league titles
- League titles (1): 1988
- Division titles (1): 1988

Team data
- Name: Riverside Red Wave (1988–1990)
- Colors: Red, white
- Ballpark: Riverside Sports Center (1988–1990)

The Riverside Red Wave were a Minor League Baseball team in Riverside, California. The Red Wave were Class A-Advanced California League affiliate of the San Diego Padres. Plagued by poor attendance, the franchise moved to Adelanto following the 1990 season. The team would become the High Desert Mavericks.

== History ==
In the fall of 1987, Bobby Brett and his brothers George, John, and Ken purchased the Salinas franchise for $250,000. The Brett ownership group signed a player development contract with the San Diego Padres. With two months until opening day the city approved a stadium lease with the club that included $1.5 million to upgrade the Riverside Sports Center. The team was headed to the inland empire where they hastily prepared for the season. Construction quickly ensued to bring the stadium capacity from 1,200 to 3,500. Clubhouses, offices, and concession facilities were added to the complex. The Riverside Press-Enterprise newspaper ran a name the team contest. With over three thousand entries a new team name was selected, the Red Wave.

Despite a slow start the team finished the year 85-57 to claim the Southern Division title. In the division round of the post season the Red Wave beat the Palm Springs Angels in five games to advance to the league championship. Riverside swept the Stockton Ports to win the California League. Riverside may have won a league title on the field, but it finished last in attendance. The team was met with resistance in their efforts to sell beer at the games. At the time beer sales accounted for roughly fifteen percent of team's revenue. This would cost the Red Wave over $80,000 over the course of their existence. Multiple attempts to obtain a license to sell beer were met with resistance. The club eventually conceded these efforts and accepted that attendance figures would fail to meet expectations.

The team's inaugural season proved to be their most successful. The Red Wave went an identical 64-78 in the next two seasons, finishing in last place in the Southern Division both years. Following the conclusion of the 1990 season the club confirmed what had been long speculated, they would be relocating to a brand new ballpark in Adelanto. Upon moving the team adopted a unique moniker to represent the region, the High Desert Mavericks.

- Notable players and coaches

- Bruce Bochy

== Ballpark ==
The Riverside Sports Center served as the Red Wave's primary ballpark. Now known as the Riverside Sports Complex, the facility is the home of UC Riverside baseball.

== Season-by-season records ==
Season	PDC	Division	Finish	Wins	Losses	Win%	Postseason	Manager	Attendance
Riverside Red Wave
1988	SDP	South	1st	85	57	.599	Defeated Palm Springs in division series 3-2; Defeated Stockton in championship series 3-0	Tony Torchia	60,509
1989	SDP	South	4th	64	78	.451		Steve Lubratich	80,154
1990	SDP	South	4th	64	78	.451		Bruce Bochy	82,420

Division winner	League champions

Preceded by Salinas Spurs	California League franchise 1988-1990	Succeeded by High Desert Mavericks
