= Riverside Sports Complex =

Baseball venue in Riverside, California

- RSC, The Plex
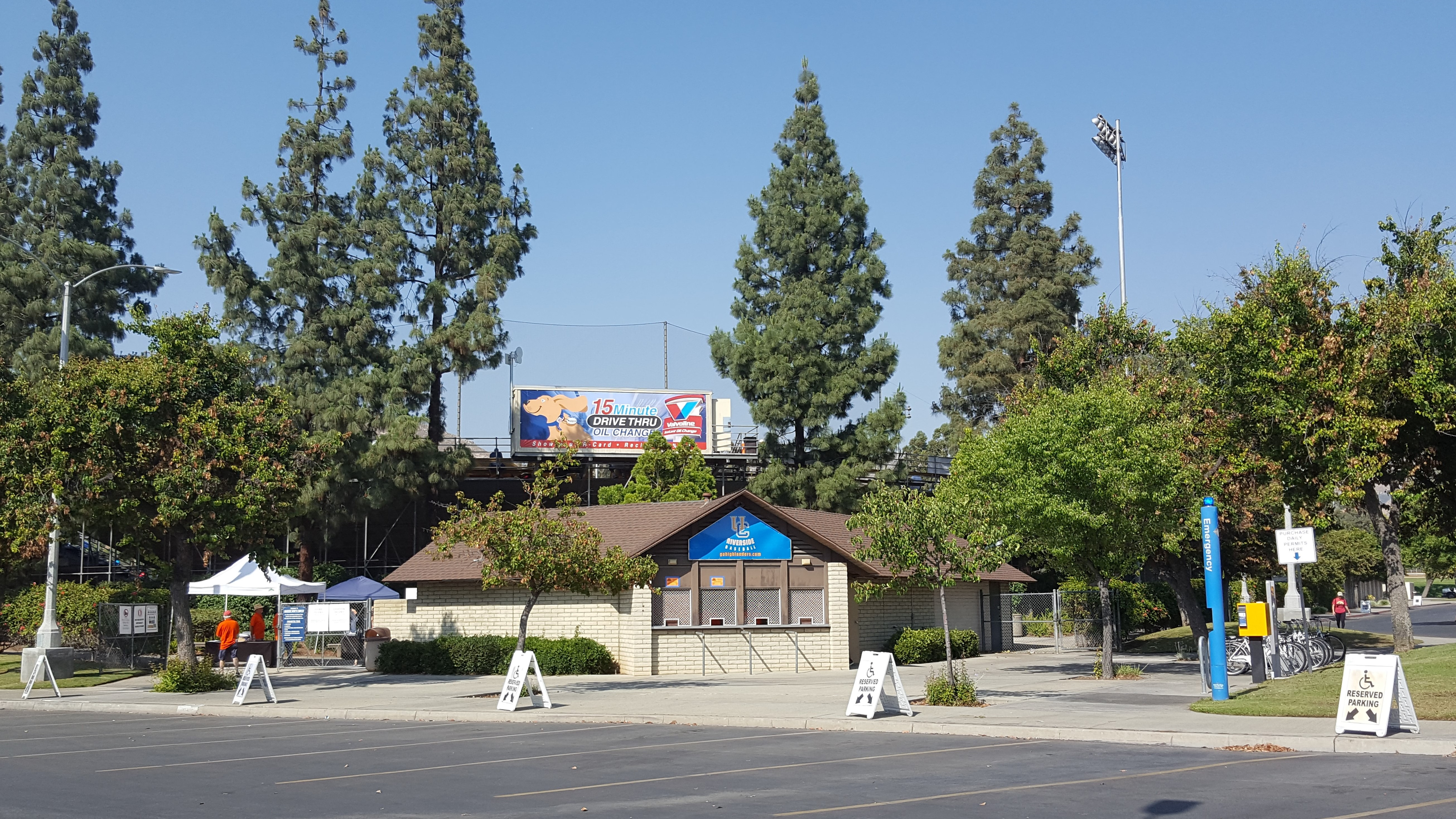
- Interactive map of Riverside Sports Complex
- Full name: Riverside Sports Complex Baseball Stadium
- Former names: Riverside/UCR Sports Complex
- Location: Riverside Sports Complex; Riverside, CA 92507
- Coordinates: 33.981822°N 117.33421°W
- Owner: University of California, Riverside
- Operator: University of California, Riverside Athletics Department
- Capacity: 2,500
- Surface: Natural grass
- Scoreboard: Yes
- Field size: Left Field - 330 feet (101 m); Left-Center - 380 feet (116 m); Center Field - 400 feet (122 m); Right-Center - 380 feet (116 m); Right Field - 330 feet (101 m)

Construction
- Opened: N/A

Tenants
- UC Riverside Highlanders baseball (NCAA); Riverside Pilots (CL) (1993–1995); Riverside Red Wave (CL) (1988–1990)

The Riverside Sports Complex, in Riverside, California, is the home field of the University of California, Riverside baseball team. The stadium seats 2,500 and features a home team locker room built personally by Troy Percival, a UC Riverside alumnus.

A statue of the UCR Bear in concrete just inside the entrance to the facility was erected in 2007. The stadium also has a pair of hitting cages located underneath the grandstands.

== History ==
The stadium is primarily used for baseball and was the home of Riverside Pilots before they moved to Lancaster to become the Lancaster JetHawks in 1996. It was also the home of the Riverside Red Wave from 1988 to 1990.

The stadium was the site of the Division II College World Series from 1980 to 1984.

== Gallery ==
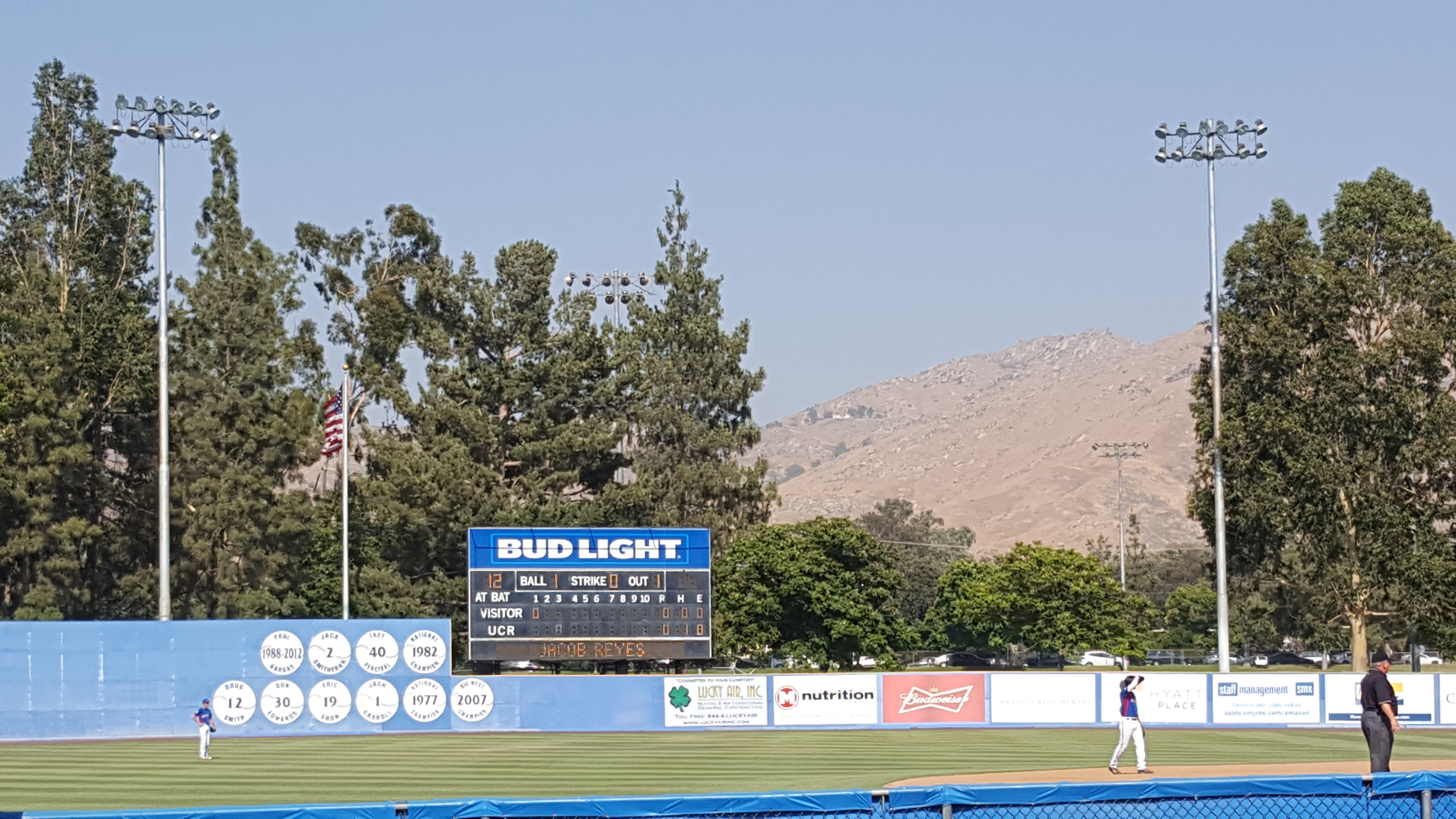
Riverside Sports Complex-scoreboard

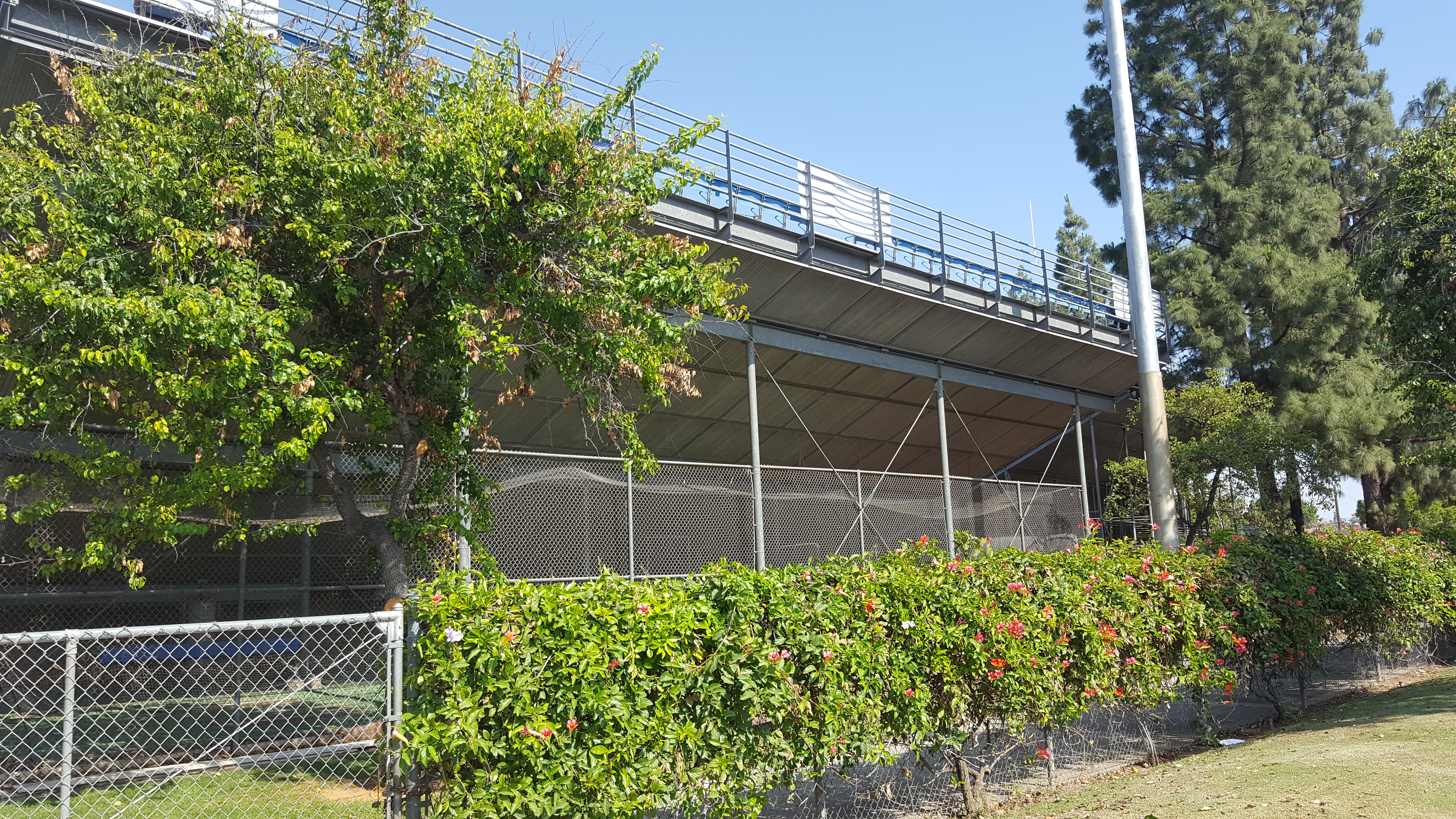
Riverside Sports Complex-grandstand and batting cages

== See also ==
- UC Riverside Highlanders
- List of NCAA Division I baseball venues
