= Salinas Spurs =

- 1954–1992; (1954–1958, 1963–1965, 1973–1980, 1982–1987, 1989–1992); Salinas, California

Minor league affiliations
- Previous classes: Class A (1963–1965, 1973–1980, 1982–1987, 1989–1992); Class-C (1954–1958)
- League: California League

Major league affiliations
- Previous teams: Independent Team The team consisted of mainly Japanese players (1992); San Francisco Giants (1989); Seattle Mariners (1984–1987); Chicago Cubs (1982–1983); California Angels (1973–1980); Cleveland Indians (1965); New York Mets (1963–1964); Milwaukee Braves (1956–1958); Pittsburgh Pirates (1955)

Minor league titles
- League titles: 1957

Team data
- Previous names: Salinas Spurs (1982–1987, 1989–1992); Salinas Angels (1976–1980); Salinas Packers (1973–1975); Salinas Indians (1965); Salinas Mets (1963–1964); Salinas Packers (1954–1958)
- Previous parks: Salinas Municipal Stadium

Several minor league baseball teams have been based in Salinas, California and played in the California League.

== Salinas Spurs ==
The Salinas Spurs were a California League team that played from 1982 to 1987 and again from 1989 to 1992. Located in Salinas, California, they were affiliated with the Chicago Cubs from 1982 to 1983, the Seattle Mariners from 1984 to 1987, and in 1989 they had a partial working agreement with the San Francisco Giants. That season, they had seven Japanese players play for them.

They did not play as the Salinas Spurs in 1988, because they moved to Riverside, California to become the Riverside Red Wave. Baseball returned to Salinas after the Fresno Suns moved there for the 1989 season and became the Spurs. Their last affiliation (a partial one) was with the Chicago White Sox in their final season in 1992, when they had half the roster of Japanese players with agreements with Japanese professional baseball leagues.

== Notable alumni ==
- Andy Allanson
- Thad Bosley (1976)
- Tom Brunansky (1979) MLB All-Star
- Dave Burba (1987)
- Phil Cavarretta (1964, MGR) 4x MLB All-Star; 1945 NL Most Valuable Player
- Mark Clear (1977–1978) 2x MLB All-Star
- Dave Collins (1974)
- Julio Cruz (1976)
- Todd Cruz (1991)
- Leon Durham (1990) 2x MLB All-Star
- Dave Engle (1978) MLB All-Star
- David Hardy (1987)
- Bud Harrelson (1963–1964) 2x MLB All-Star
- Billy Hatcher (1982)
- Steve Howe (1990) MLB All-Star; 1980 NL Rookie of the Year
- Darrin Jackson (1983)
- Mack Jones (1958)
- Joe Maddon (1977–1978) MLB MGR: 3x MLB Manager of the Year (2008, 2011, 2015); MGR: 2016 World Series Champion – Chicago Cubs
- Rance Mulliniks (1975)
- Jeff Nelson (1987) MLB All-Star
- Gary Pettis (1980) 5 x Gold Glove
- Dennis Rasmussen (1980)
- Buck Rodgers (1975, MGR) 1987 NL Manager of the Year
- Ken Schrom (1977) MLB All-Star
- Dick Selma (1963)
- Mac Suzuki (1992)
- Roy Thomas (1987)
- Dickie Thon (1977) MLB All-Star
- Gary Varsho (1983)
- Omar Vizquel (1987) 11x Gold Glove; 3x MLB All-Star
- Mike Witt (1979) 2 x MLB All-Star

== Year-by-year record ==
Year	Record	Finish	Manager	Playoffs
1982	68-72	5th	Rich Morales	
1983	57-83	9th	George Enright	
1984	66-74	5th (t)	R. J. Harrison	
1985	89-55	1st	R. J. Harrison	Lost in 1st round
1986	77-65	3rd	Greg Mahlberg	Lost in 1st round
1987	64-78	9th	Greg Mahlberg	
1989	51-91	10th	Tim Ireland	
1990	47-93	10th	Hide Koga	
1991	55-81	9th	Hide Koga	
1992	36-99	10th	Hide Koga	

== Salinas Angels ==
The Salinas Angels were a California League baseball team based in Salinas, California, USA that played from 1976 to 1980. They played their home games at Salinas Municipal Stadium.

The team made the California League playoffs in 1976 and 1977, reaching (and losing) the league finals in each of those seasons.

Each season, the team had a new manager. The team's managers, by year: Del Crandall (1976), Moose Stubing (1977), Chuck Cottier (1978), Chris Cannizzaro (1979) and Tom Zimmer (1980).

Notable players include major league All-Stars Tom Brunansky, Mark Clear, Dave Engle, Ken Schrom, Dickie Thon and Mike Witt.

== Salinas Packers ==
There were two incarnations of the baseball team known as the Salinas Packers. The first existed from 1954 to 1958, and was affiliated with the Pittsburgh Pirates in 1955 and the Milwaukee Braves from 1956 to 1958. The second incarnation existed from 1973 to 1975, and was affiliated with the California Angels. They played their home games at Municipal Stadium in the second incarnation. Both incarnations were located in Salinas, California and played in the California League.

In 1957, they won the California League title. One of their players, John Balaz, was named MVP in 1973. In 1976, they were renamed the Salinas Angels.

=== Year-by-year record ===
Year	Record	Finish	Manager	Playoffs
1954	56-84	7th	John O'Neil / George Genovese	
1955	60-86	6th	Buck Elliott / Jack Paepke	
1956	53-87	7th	Eddie Lake	
1957	68-67	4th	Leo Thomas / Bill Kreuger	League Champs
1958	53-85	8th	Victor Marasco / Al Forthmann	
1973	77-63	1st (t)	Jim Saul	
1974	78-62	3rd	Jim Saul	
1975	67-73	5th (t)	Buck Rodgers	none

== Salinas Indians ==
The Salinas Indians were a California League baseball team based in Salinas, California, USA that played in 1965. They were managed by Phil Cavarretta and were affiliated with the Cleveland Indians. Their home stadium was Salinas Municipal Stadium.

Multiple major leaguers played for the team, including Frank Baker, Gary Boyd, Larry Foster, Gomer Hodge, Ray Miller, Dave Nelson, Sam Parrilla, Richie Scheinblum and Oscar Zamora.
