= Palm Springs Angels =

- 1986–1993; Palm Springs, California

Minor league affiliations
- Class: Class A-Advanced (1990–1993); Class A (1986–1989)
- League: California League (1986–1993)

Major league affiliations
- Team: California Angels (1986–1993)

Minor league titles
- Division titles (1): 1986

Team data
- Colors: Red, navy blue, white
- Ballpark: Angels Stadium

The Palm Springs Angels were a minor league baseball team of the Class A California League from 1986 to 1993 and an affiliate of the California Angels. Following the 1993 season the franchise relocated to Lake Elsinore, California to become the Lake Elsinore Storm.

== History ==
Following the 1985 season, the Redwood Pioneers were relocated to Palm Springs. Redwood had been the California Angels California League affiliate. The Angels had used Palm Springs as a spring training location. Upon moving to the desert the team adopted the name of their parent club to become the Palm Springs Angels.

Although average game attendance was below average of the league in the late 1980s, the P.S. Angels picked up on fans in the early 1990s, when stadium attendance records surpassed the 100,000 mark in 1992 and again in 1993.

The last team owner, Ken Stickney in The Desert Sun interview stated the P.S. Angels' move was due to a lack of city council support to approve a new minor league ballpark, after the California Angels left for a new spring training facility in Tempe, Arizona.

Former Palm Spring Angels players include Pete Rose Jr., Dante Bichette, J. T. Snow, Tim Salmon, Garret Anderson, Troy Percival and Jim Edmonds.

== Notable alumni ==
- Garret Anderson (1992) 3 x MLB All-Star
- Floyd Bannister (1991) 2 x MLB All-Star
- Dante Bichette (1986) 4 x MLB All-Star
- Bob Boone (1987) 7 x Gold Glove; 4 x MLB All-Star
- John Candelaria (1986) MLB All-Star; 1977 NL ERA Leader
- Jim Edmonds (1990–1991) 8 x Gold Glove; 4 x MLB All-Star
- Mike Fetters (1987)
- Kelly Gruber (1993) 2 x MLB All-Star
- Bryan Harvey (1986) 2 x MLB All-Star
- Roberto Hernandez (1989) 2 x MLB All-Star
- Kirk McCaskill (1987)
- Mark McLemore (1988, 1990)
- Mike Marshall (1991) MLB All-Star
- Donnie Moore (1987-1988) MLB All-Star
- Dan Petry (1988) MLB All-Star
- Troy Percival (1992) 4 x MLB All-Star
- Eduardo Perez (1992)
- Bryan Price (1986)
- Tim Salmon (1990) 1993 AL Rookie of the Year
- Paul Sorrento (1986, 1988)
- Lee Stevens (1987)
- Mark Sweeney (1993) All-Time MLB Pinch Hit RBI leader
- Fernando Valenzuela (1991) 6 x MLB All-Star; 1981 NL Rookie of the Year; 1981 NL Cy Young Award
