= 1983 San Diego Padres season =

1983 San Diego Padres
- League: National League
- Division: West
- Ballpark: Jack Murphy Stadium
- City: San Diego
- Record: 81–81 (.500)
- Divisional place: 4th
- Owners: Ray Kroc
- General managers: Jack McKeon
- Managers: Dick Williams
- Television: KFMB-TV
- Radio: KFMB (AM) (Dave Campbell, Jerry Coleman, Ted Leitner, Bob Chandler); XEXX (Gustavo Lopez, Mario Thomas Zapiain)

The 1983 San Diego Padres season was the 15th season in franchise history. The team finished with an 81–81 record, their second year in a row finishing 81–81. They scored 653 runs and allowed 653 runs for a run differential of zero, becoming only the second team (after the 1922 Chicago White Sox) with a .500 winning percentage and a zero run differential.

This was the final season under the ownership of Ray Kroc, as he died on January 14, 1984. Ownership of the Padres would pass to Kroc's widow Joan, who would continue to own the team until 1990.

== Offseason ==
- November 3, 1982: Dave Edwards was released by the Padres.
- November 18, 1982: Broderick Perkins and Juan Eichelberger were traded by the Padres to the Cleveland Indians for Ed Whitson.
- December 21, 1982: Steve Garvey was signed as a free agent by the Padres.

== Regular season ==
- In 1983, Steve Garvey set a National League record with 1207 consecutive games played. The streak lasted from September 3, 1975, to July 29, 1983. The streak ended when he broke his thumb in a collision at home plate against the Atlanta Braves.

=== Opening Day starters ===
- Juan Bonilla
- Dave Dravecky
- Steve Garvey
- Ruppert Jones
- Terry Kennedy
- Sixto Lezcano
- Gene Richards
- Luis Salazar
- Garry Templeton

=== Season standings ===
NL West
Team	W	L	Pct.	GB	Home	Road
Los Angeles Dodgers	91	71	.562	—	48‍–‍32	43‍–‍39
Atlanta Braves	88	74	.543	3	46‍–‍34	42‍–‍40
Houston Astros	85	77	.525	6	46‍–‍36	39‍–‍41
San Diego Padres	81	81	.500	10	47‍–‍34	34‍–‍47
San Francisco Giants	79	83	.488	12	43‍–‍38	36‍–‍45
Cincinnati Reds	74	88	.457	17	36‍–‍45	38‍–‍43

=== Record vs. opponents ===
1983 National League record Sources:
Team	ATL	CHC	CIN	HOU	LAD	MON	NYM	PHI	PIT	SD	SF	STL
Atlanta	—	5–7	12–6	11–7	7–11	7–5	8–4	7–5	6–6	9–9	9–9	7–5
Chicago	7–5	—	4–8	5–7	6–6	7–11	9–9	5–13	9–9	5–7	4–8	10–8
Cincinnati	6–12	8–4	—	5–13	7–11	4–8	7–5	6–6	6–6	9–9	10–8	6–6
Houston	7–11	7–5	13–5	—	6–12	8–4	9–3	4–8	6–6	11–7	12–6	2–10
Los Angeles	11–7	6–6	11–7	12–6	—	7–5	7–5	11–1	6–6	6–12–1	5–13	9–3
Montreal	5–7	11–7	8–4	4–8	5–7	—	8–10	8–10–1	8–10	8–4	8–4	9–9
New York	4–8	9–9	5–7	3–9	5–7	10–8	—	6–12	9–9	6–6	5–7	6–12
Philadelphia	5-7	13–5	6–6	8–4	1–11	10–8–1	12–6	—	11–7	5–7	5–7	14–4
Pittsburgh	6–6	9–9	6–6	6–6	6–6	10–8	9–9	7–11	—	9–3	6–6	10–8
San Diego	9–9	7–5	9–9	7–11	12–6–1	4–8	6–6	7–5	3–9	—	11–7	6–6
San Francisco	9–9	8–4	8–10	6–12	13–5	4–8	7–5	7–5	6–6	7–11	—	4–8
St. Louis	5–7	8–10	6–6	10–2	3–9	9–9	12–6	4–14	8–10	6–6	8–4	—

=== Notable transactions ===
- April 19, 1983: Bobby Brown was signed as a free agent with the San Diego Padres.
- May 4, 1983: Chris Welsh was purchased from the Padres by the Montreal Expos.
- May 22, 1983: Joe Lefebvre was traded by the Padres to the Philadelphia Phillies for Sid Monge.
- August 31, 1983: Sixto Lezcano and a player to be named later were traded by the Padres to the Philadelphia Phillies for players to be named later. The Phillies completed their part of the deal by sending Marty Decker, Ed Wojna, Lance McCullers, and Darren Burroughs (minors) to the Padres on September 20. The Padres completed their part of the deal by sending Steve Fireovid to the Phillies on October 11.

=== Roster ===
1983 San Diego Padres
Roster
Pitchers: 51 Greg Booker; 39 Floyd Chiffer; 49 Mike Couchee; 44 Marty Decker; 35 Luis DeLeon; 43 Dave Dravecky; 62 Steve Fireovid; 40 Andy Hawkins; 48 Tim Lollar; 25 Gary Lucas; 42 Sid Monge; 27 John Montefusco; 27 Dennis Rasmussen; 30 Eric Show; 29 Elías Sosa; 58 Mark Thurmond; 26 Chris Welsh; 31 Ed Whitson	Catchers: 15 Bruce Bochy; 10 Doug Gwosdz; 16 Terry Kennedy; Infielders: 7 Kurt Bevacqua; 3 Juan Bonilla; 11 Tim Flannery; 6 Steve Garvey; 22 George Hinshaw; 21 Jody Lansford; 12 Mario Ramírez; 36 Edwin Rodríguez; 4 Luis Salazar; 1 Garry Templeton	Outfielders: 20 Bobby Brown; 50 Gerry Davis; 19 Tony Gwynn; 9 Ruppert Jones; 18 Joe Lefebvre; 14 Sixto Lezcano; 18 Kevin McReynolds; 17 Gene Richards; 20 Jerry Turner; 2 Alan Wiggins	Manager: 23 Dick Williams; Coaches: 34 Jack Krol; 46 Norm Sherry; 28 Bobby Tolan; 32 Ozzie Virgil

== Player stats ==
=== Batting ===
==== Starters by position ====
Note: Pos = Position; G = Games played; AB = At bats; H = Hits; Avg. = Batting average; HR = Home runs; RBI = Runs batted in

Pos	Player	G	AB	H	Avg.	HR	RBI
C	Terry Kennedy	149	549	156	.284	17	98
1B	Steve Garvey	100	388	114	.294	14	59
2B	Juan Bonilla	152	556	132	.237	4	45
SS	Garry Templeton	126	460	121	.263	3	40
3B	Luis Salazar	134	481	124	.258	14	45
LF	Bobby Brown	57	225	60	.267	5	22
CF	Ruppert Jones	133	335	78	.233	12	49
RF	Sixto Lezcano	97	317	74	.233	8	49

==== Other batters ====
Note: G = Games played; AB = At bats; H = Hits; Avg. = Batting average; HR = Home runs; RBI = Runs batted in

Player	G	AB	H	Avg.	HR	RBI
Alan Wiggins	144	503	139	.276	0	22
Tony Gwynn	86	304	94	.309	1	37
Gene Richards	95	233	64	.275	3	22
Tim Flannery	92	214	50	.234	3	19
Kurt Bevacqua	74	156	38	.244	2	24
Kevin McReynolds	39	140	31	.221	4	14
Mario Ramírez	55	107	21	.196	0	12
Doug Gwosdz	39	55	6	.109	1	4
Bruce Bochy	23	42	9	.214	0	3
Jerry Turner	25	23	3	.130	0	0
Joe Lefebvre	18	20	5	.250	0	1
George Hinshaw	7	16	7	.438	0	4
Gerry Davis	5	15	5	.333	0	1
Edwin Rodríguez	7	12	2	.167	0	0
Jody Lansford	12	8	2	.250	1	2

=== Pitching ===
==== Starting pitchers ====
Note: G = Games pitched; IP = Innings pitched; W = Wins; L = Losses; ERA = Earned run average; SO = Strikeouts

Player	G	IP	W	L	ERA	SO
Eric Show	35	201.0	15	12	4.17	120
Dave Dravecky	28	183.2	14	10	3.58	74
Tim Lollar	30	175.2	7	12	4.61	135
Andy Hawkins	21	120.0	5	7	2.93	59
Mark Thurmond	21	115.1	7	3	2.65	49

==== Other pitchers ====
Note: G = Games pitched; IP = Innings pitched; W = Wins; L = Losses; ERA = Earned run average; SO = Strikeouts

Player	G	IP	W	L	ERA	SO
Ed Whitson	31	144.1	5	7	4.30	81
John Montefusco	31	95.1	9	4	3.30	52
Chris Welsh	7	14.1	0	1	2.51	5
Dennis Rasmussen	4	13.2	0	0	1.98	13
Greg Booker	6	11.2	0	1	7.71	5

==== Relief pitchers ====
Note: G = Games pitched; W = Wins; L = Losses; SV = Saves; ERA = Earned run average; SO = Strikeouts

Player	G	W	L	SV	ERA	SO
Gary Lucas	62	5	8	17	2.87	60
Luis DeLeón	63	6	6	13	2.68	90
Sid Monge	47	7	3	7	3.15	32
Elias Sosa	41	1	4	1	4.35	45
Floyd Chiffer	15	0	2	1	3.18	15
Mike Couchee	8	0	1	0	5.14	5
Marty Decker	4	0	0	0	2.08	9
Steve Fireovid	3	0	0	0	1.80	1

== Award winners ==
1983 Major League Baseball All-Star Game

== Farm system ==
Level	Team	League	Manager
AAA	Las Vegas Stars	Pacific Coast League	Harry Dunlop and Bob Cluck
AA	Beaumont Golden Gators	Texas League	Jack Maloof
A	Reno Padres	California League	Jim Skaalen
A	Salem Redbirds	Carolina League	Steve Smith
A	Miami Marlins	Florida State League	Jim Breazeale
A-Short Season	Spokane Indians	Northwest League	Ed Olsen

LEAGUE CHAMPIONS: Beaumont
