= 1982 San Diego Padres season =

1982 San Diego Padres
- League: National League
- Division: West
- Ballpark: Jack Murphy Stadium
- City: San Diego, California
- Record: 81–81 (.500)
- Divisional place: 4th
- Owners: Ray Kroc
- General managers: Jack McKeon
- Managers: Dick Williams
- Television: KFMB-TV (Dave Campbell, Jerry Coleman, Ted Leitner, Bob Chandler)
- Radio: KFMB (AM) (Dave Campbell, Jerry Coleman, Bob Chandler); XEXX (Gustavo Lopez, Mario Thomas Zapiain)

The 1982 San Diego Padres season was the 14th in franchise history. The Padres finished with a record of 81 wins and 81 losses (.500), good for fourth place in the National League West, eight games behind the division champion Atlanta Braves.

== Offseason ==
- December 10, 1981: Ozzie Smith, Steve Mura and a player to be named later were traded by the Padres to the St. Louis Cardinals for Sixto Lezcano, Garry Templeton and a player to be named later.
- January 27, 1982: Craig Stimac was purchased from the Padres by the Cleveland Indians.
- February 19, 1982: The Padres and Cardinals completed their December 10 deal, with the Padres sending Al Olmsted to the Cardinals and the Cardinals sending Luis DeLeón to the Padres.
- February 22, 1982: Barry Evans was purchased from the Padres by the New York Yankees.
- February 25, 1982: John Littlefield was released by the Padres.

== Regular season ==
- In 1982, Sixto Lezcano became the only player to hit grand slams on two different opening day games. He hit the first grand slam in 1980.
- July 19, 1982: Tony Gwynn made his Major League Baseball debut. In a 7-6 loss to the Philadelphia Phillies, Gwynn had four at-bats with two hits, one run scored, and one RBI.
- September 18, 1982: Clyde McCullough was serving as the Padres' bullpen coach when he was found dead in his San Francisco hotel room on September 18 during a road trip. He was a catcher in Major League Baseball for 15 years (1940s-1950s) for the Chicago Cubs and Pittsburgh Pirates. He was interred in Rosewood Memorial Park Cemetery, Virginia Beach, Virginia.

=== Season standings ===
NL West
Team	W	L	Pct.	GB	Home	Road
Atlanta Braves	89	73	.549	—	42‍–‍39	47‍–‍34
Los Angeles Dodgers	88	74	.543	1	43‍–‍38	45‍–‍36
San Francisco Giants	87	75	.537	2	45‍–‍36	42‍–‍39
San Diego Padres	81	81	.500	8	43‍–‍38	38‍–‍43
Houston Astros	77	85	.475	12	43‍–‍38	34‍–‍47
Cincinnati Reds	61	101	.377	28	33‍–‍48	28‍–‍53

=== Record vs. opponents ===
1982 National League record Sources:
Team	ATL	CHC	CIN	HOU	LAD	MON	NYM	PHI	PIT	SD	SF	STL
Atlanta	—	8–4	14–4	10–8	7–11	5–7	9–3	6–6	4–8	11–7	8–10	7–5
Chicago	4–8	—	6–6	9–3	5–7	6–12	9–9	9–9	9–9	4–8	6–6	6–12
Cincinnati	4–14	6–6	—	7–11	7–11	4–8	7–5	5–7	4–8	6–12	6–12	5–7
Houston	8–10	3–9	11–7	—	7–11	4–8	8–4	7–5	9–3	9–9	5–13	6–6
Los Angeles	11–7	7–5	11–7	11–7	—	8–4	6–6	4–8	5–7	9–9	9–9	7–5
Montreal	7–5	12–6	8–4	8–4	4–8	—	11–7	8–10	7–11	7–5	4–8	10–8
New York	3–9	9–9	5–7	4–8	6–6	7–11	—	7–11	8–10	6–6	4–8	6–12
Philadelphia	6-6	9–9	7–5	5–7	8–4	10–8	11–7	—	9–9	7–5	10–2	7–11
Pittsburgh	8–4	9–9	8–4	3–9	7–5	11–7	10–8	9–9	—	6–6	6–6	7–11
San Diego	7–11	8–4	12–6	9–9	9–9	5–7	6–6	5–7	6–6	—	10–8	4–8
San Francisco	10–8	6–6	12–6	13–5	9–9	8–4	8–4	2–10	6–6	8–10	—	5–7
St. Louis	5–7	12–6	7–5	6–6	5–7	8–10	12–6	11–7	11–7	8–4	7–5	—

=== Opening Day starters ===
- Juan Bonilla
- Juan Eichelberger
- Ruppert Jones
- Terry Kennedy
- Sixto Lezcano
- Broderick Perkins
- Gene Richards
- Luis Salazar
- Garry Templeton

=== Notable transactions ===
- May 22, 1982: Kim Seaman was traded by the Padres to the Montreal Expos for Jerry Manuel.
- June 7, 1982: Mark Wasinger was drafted by the Padres in the 3rd round of the 1982 Major League Baseball draft.
- June 8, 1982: Danny Boone was traded by the Padres to the Houston Astros for Joe Pittman.
- June 8, 1982: Jerry Manuel was traded by the Padres to the Montreal Expos for a player to be named later. The Expos completed the deal by sending Mike Griffin to the Padres on August 30.
- September 1, 1982: Benito Santiago was signed by the Padres as an amateur free agent.

=== Roster ===
1982 San Diego Padres
Roster
Pitchers: 29 Danny Boone; 39 Floyd Chiffer; 51 John Curtis; 35 Luis DeLeon; 43 Dave Dravecky; 13 Juan Eichelberger; 45 Mike Griffin; 40 Andy Hawkins; 48 Tim Lollar; 25 Gary Lucas; 27 John Montefusco; 30 Eric Show; 26 Chris Welsh; 40 Rick Wise	Catchers: 10 Doug Gwosdz; 16 Terry Kennedy; 9 Steve Swisher; 5 Ron Tingley; Infielders: 5 Randy Bass; 7 Kurt Bevacqua; 3 Juan Bonilla; 6 Tim Flannery; 20 Rick Lancellotti; 21 Jody Lansford; 18 Joe Lefebvre; 11 Jerry Manuel; 15 Broderick Perkins; 8 Joe Pittman; 12 Mario Ramírez; 4 Luis Salazar; 1 Garry Templeton	Outfielders: 24 Dave Edwards; 19 Tony Gwynn; 11 George Hinshaw; 22 Ruppert Jones; 14 Sixto Lezcano; 17 Gene Richards; 2 Alan Wiggins	Manager: 23 Dick Williams; Coaches: 34 Jack Krol; 46 Norm Sherry; 28 Bobby Tolan; - Clyde McCullough; 32 Ozzie Virgil

== Player stats ==
=== Batting ===
==== Starters by position ====
Note: Pos = Position; G = Games played; AB = At bats; H = Hits; Avg. = Batting average; HR = Home runs; RBI = Runs batted in

Pos	Player	G	AB	H	Avg.	HR	RBI
C	Terry Kennedy	153	562	166	.295	21	97
1B	Broderick Perkins	125	342	94	.271	2	34
2B	Tim Flannery	122	379	100	.264	0	30
3B	Luis Salazar	145	524	127	.242	8	62
SS	Garry Templeton	141	563	139	.247	6	64
LF	Gene Richards	132	521	149	.286	3	28
CF	Ruppert Jones	116	424	120	.283	12	61
RF	Sixto Lezcano	138	470	136	.289	16	84

==== Other batters ====
Note: G = Games played; AB = At bats; H = Hits; Avg. = Batting average; HR = Home runs; RBI = Runs batted in

Player	G	AB	H	Avg.	HR	RBI
Alan Wiggins	72	254	65	.256	1	15
Joe Lefebvre	102	239	57	.238	4	21
Tony Gwynn	54	190	55	.289	1	17
Juan Bonilla	45	182	51	.280	0	8
Kurt Bevacqua	64	123	31	.252	0	24
Joe Pittman	55	118	30	.254	0	7
Steve Swisher	26	58	10	.172	2	3
Dave Edwards	71	55	10	.182	1	2
Rick Lancellotti	17	39	7	.179	0	4
Randy Bass	13	30	6	.200	1	8
Mario Ramírez	13	23	4	.174	0	1
Joe Lansford	13	22	4	.182	0	3
Ron Tingley	8	20	2	.100	0	0
Doug Gwosdz	7	17	3	.176	0	0
George Hinshaw	6	15	4	.267	0	1
Jerry Manuel	2	5	1	.200	0	1

=== Pitching ===
==== Starting pitchers ====
Note: G = Games pitched; IP = Innings pitched; W = Wins; L = Losses; ERA = Earned run average; SO = Strikeouts

Player	G	IP	W	L	ERA	SO
Tim Lollar	34	232.2	16	9	3.13	150
John Montefusco	32	184.1	10	11	4.00	83
Juan Eichelberger	31	177.2	7	14	4.20	74
Chris Welsh	28	139.1	8	8	4.91	48

==== Other pitchers ====
Note: G = Games pitched; IP = Innings pitched; W = Wins; L = Losses; ERA = Earned run average; SO = Strikeouts

Player	G	IP	W	L	ERA	SO
Eric Show	47	150.0	10	6	2.64	88
John Curtis	26	116.1	8	6	4.10	54
Dave Dravecky	31	105.0	5	3	2.57	59
Andy Hawkins	15	63.2	2	5	4.10	25

==== Relief pitchers ====
Note: G = Games pitched; IP = Innings pitched; W = Wins; L = losses; SV = Saves; ERA = Earned run average; SO = Strikeouts

Player	G	IP	W	L	SV	ERA	SO
Gary Lucas	65	97.1	1	10	16	3.24	64
Luis DeLeón	61	102.0	9	5	15	2.03	60
Floyd Chiffer	51	79.1	4	3	4	2.95	48
Danny Boone	10	16.0	1	0	1	5.63	8
Mike Griffin	7	10.1	0	1	0	3.48	4
Rick Wise	1	2.0	0	0	0	9.00	0

== Award winners ==
1982 Major League Baseball All-Star Game

- Ruppert Jones, reserve

== Farm system ==
Level	Team	League	Manager
AAA	Hawaii Islanders	Pacific Coast League	Doug Rader
AA	Amarillo Gold Sox	Texas League	Glenn Ezell
A	Reno Padres	California League	Jack Maloof
A	Salem Redbirds	Carolina League	Jim Zerilla
A-Short Season	Walla Walla Padres	Northwest League	Jim Skaalen
Rookie	GCL Padres	Gulf Coast League	Manny Crespo
