= 1983 California League season =

- League: California League
- Sport: Baseball
- Duration: April 8 – August 28
- Games: 140
- Teams: 10

Regular season
- League champions: Visalia Oaks
- Season MVP: Stan Holmes, Visalia Oaks

Playoffs
- League champions: Redwood Pioneers
- Runners-up: Visalia Oaks

CALL seasons
- ← 1982 1984 →

The 1983 California League was a Class A baseball season played between April 8 and August 28. Ten teams played a 140-game schedule, as the winner of each half of the season qualified for the playoffs.

The Redwood Pioneers won the California League championship, as they defeated the Visalia Oaks in the final round of the playoffs.

== Team changes ==
- The San Jose Expos ended their affiliation with the Montreal Expos. The club was renamed to the San Jose Bees.

== Teams ==
1983 California League
Division	Team	City	MLB Affiliate	Stadium
North	Lodi Dodgers	Lodi, California	Los Angeles Dodgers	Lawrence Park
North	Modesto A's	Modesto, California	Oakland Athletics	John Thurman Field
North	Redwood Pioneers	Rohnert Park, California	California Angels	Rohnert Park Stadium
North	Reno Padres	Reno, Nevada	San Diego Padres	Moana Stadium
North	Stockton Ports	Stockton, California	Milwaukee Brewers	Billy Hebert Field
South	Bakersfield Mariners	Bakersfield, California	Seattle Mariners	Sam Lynn Ballpark
South	Fresno Giants	Fresno, California	San Francisco Giants	John Euless Park
South	Salinas Spurs	Salinas, California	Chicago Cubs	Salinas Municipal Stadium
South	San Jose Bees	San Jose, California	None	San Jose Municipal Stadium
South	Visalia Oaks	Visalia, California	Minnesota Twins	Recreation Park

== Map of teams ==
North Division South Division

== Regular season ==
=== Summary ===
- The Visalia Oaks finished with the best record in the regular season for the first time since 1981.
- Donell Nixon of the Bakersfield Mariners set a league-record with 144 stolen bases.

=== Standings ===
North Division
Team	Win	Loss	%	GB
Stockton Ports	79	59	.572	–
Modesto A's	75	64	.540	4.5
Redwood Pioneers	73	65	.529	6
Reno Padres	63	76	.453	16.5
Lodi Dodgers	60	78	.435	19
South Division
Team	Win	Loss	%	GB
Visalia Oaks	87	53	.621	–
Fresno Giants	78	62	.557	9
Bakersfield Mariners	68	72	.486	19
Salinas Spurs	57	83	.407	30
San Jose Bees	56	84	.400	31

== League Leaders ==
=== Batting leaders ===
Stat	Player	Total
AVG	Dave Klipstein, Stockton Ports	.341
H	Dave Klipstein, Stockton Ports	185
R	Donell Nixon, Bakersfield Mariners	116
2B	Greg Howe, Visalia Oaks	30
3B	Gary Varsho, Salinas Spurs	13
HR	Stan Holmes, Visalia Oaks	37
RBI	Stan Holmes, Visalia Oaks	115
SB	Donell Nixon, Bakersfield Mariners	144

=== Pitching leaders ===
Stat	Player	Total
W	Bill Wegman, Stockton Ports	16
ERA	Bill Wegman, Stockton Ports	1.30
CG	Tony Mack, Redwood Pioneers; Bill Wegman, Stockton Ports	15
SHO	Tim Meeks, Lodi Dodgers; Bill Wegman, Stockton Ports	4
SV	Pete Kutsukos, Reno Padres	19
IP	Tony Mack, Redwood Pioneers	196.1
SO	Randy Bockus, Fresno Giants	144

== Playoffs ==
- The Visalia Oaks finished in first place in each half of the season, therefore earning byes to the finals.
- The final round was shortened to a best-of-five series.
- The Redwood Pioneers won their first California League championship, as they defeated the Visalia Oaks in four games.

=== Playoff bracket ===
Division finals
N1	Stockton	1
N2	Redwood	2
S1	Visalia	bye

Finals
N2	Redwood	3
S1	Visalia	1

== Awards ==
California League awards
Award name	Recipient
Most Valuable Player	Stan Holmes, Visalia Oaks

== See also ==
- 1983 Major League Baseball season
