= 1981 California League season =

- League: California League
- Sport: Baseball
- Duration: April 10 – August 30
- Games: 140
- Teams: 8

Regular season
- League champions: Visalia Oaks
- Season MVP: Kent Hrbek, Visalia Oaks

Playoffs
- League champions: Lodi Dodgers
- Runners-up: Visalia Oaks

CALL seasons
- ← 1980 1982 →

The 1981 California League was a Class A baseball season played between April 10 and August 30. Eight teams played a 140-game schedule, as four teams qualified for the playoffs.

The Lodi Dodgers won the California League championship, as they defeated the Visalia Oaks in the final round of the playoffs.

== League changes ==
- As the league went down to eight teams, the divisional format was abandoned in 1981.

== Team changes ==
- The Salinas Angels disbanded.
- The Redwood Pioneers began a new affiliation with the California Angels.
- The San Jose Missions ended their affiliation with the Seattle Mariners.

== Teams ==
1981 California League
Team	City	MLB Affiliate	Stadium
Fresno Giants	Fresno, California	San Francisco Giants	John Euless Park
Lodi Dodgers	Lodi, California	Los Angeles Dodgers	Lawrence Park
Modesto A's	Modesto, California	Oakland Athletics	Del Webb Field
Redwood Pioneers	Rohnert Park, California	California Angels	Rohnert Park Stadium
Reno Silver Sox	Reno, Nevada	San Diego Padres	Moana Stadium
San Jose Missions	San Jose, California	None	San Jose Municipal Stadium
Stockton Ports	Stockton, California	Milwaukee Brewers	Billy Hebert Field
Visalia Oaks	Visalia, California	Minnesota Twins	Recreation Park

== Map of teams ==
California League teams

== Regular season ==
=== Summary ===
- The Visalia Oaks finished with the best record in the regular season for the first time since 1978.

=== Standings ===
California League
Team	Win	Loss	%	GB
Visalia Oaks	87	53	.621	–
Reno Silver Sox	81	58	.583	5.5
Lodi Dodgers	73	67	.521	14
Stockton Ports	68	71	.489	18.5
Modesto A's	67	71	.486	19
Redwood Pioneers	66	74	.471	22
Fresno Giants	63	77	.450	25
San Jose Missions	53	87	.379	35

== League Leaders ==
=== Batting leaders ===
Stat	Player	Total
AVG	Kent Hrbek, Visalia Oaks	.379
H	George Hinshaw, Reno Silver Sox	189
R	Steve Garcia, Reno Silver Sox	120
2B	Scotti Madison, Visalia Oaks	32
3B	Lyle Brackenridge, Visalia Oaks; Joe Scherger, Reno Silver Sox	10
HR	Rob Deer, Fresno Giants	33
RBI	George Hinshaw, Reno Silver Sox	131
SB	Rusty McNealy, San Jose Missions	63

=== Pitching leaders ===
Stat	Player	Total
W	Paul Voigt, Visalia Oaks	16
ERA	Ron Romanick, Redwood Pioneers	2.91
CG	Scott Arrington, Visalia Oaks; Lou Marietta, San Jose Missions; Frank Williams, Fresno Giants	14
SHO	Sam Arrington, Visalia Oaks	4
SV	Mike Couchee, Reno Silver Sox	16
IP	Ron Romanick, Redwood Pioneers	207.0
SO	Ron Romanick, Redwood Pioneers	178

== Playoffs ==
- The playoff format changed to a 1 vs. 4 and 2 vs. 3 semi-final round.
- The Lodi Dodgers won their third California League championship, as they defeated the Visalia Oaks in five games.

=== Playoff bracket ===
Semi-finals
1	Visalia	2
4	Stockton	1
2	Reno	0
3	Lodi	3

Finals
1	Visalia	2
3	Lodi	3

== Awards ==
California League awards
Award name	Recipient
Most Valuable Player	Kent Hrbek, Visalia Oaks

== See also ==
- 1981 Major League Baseball season
