= 1982 California League season =

- League: California League
- Sport: Baseball
- Duration: April 9 – August 31
- Games: 140
- Teams: 10

Regular season
- League champions: Modesto A's
- Season MVP: Kevin McReynolds, Reno Padres

Playoffs
- League champions: Modesto A's
- Runners-up: Visalia Oaks

CALL seasons
- ← 1981 1983 →

The 1982 California League was a Class A baseball season played between April 9 and August 31. Ten teams played a 140-game schedule, as the winner of each half of the season qualified for the playoffs.

The Modesto A's won the California League championship, as they defeated the Visalia Oaks in the final round of the playoffs.

== League changes ==
- As the league expanded back to ten teams, the divisional format was reintroduced.
- The two new divisions in the league were the North Division and the South Division.

== Team changes ==
- The Bakersfield Mariners join the league as an expansion team. The club joined the South Division and began an affiliation with the Seattle Mariners.
- The Salinas Spurs join the league as an expansion team. The club joined the South Division and began an affiliation with the Chicago Cubs.
- The Reno Silver Sox are renamed to the Reno Padres. The club remained affiliated with the San Diego Padres.
- The San Jose Missions began an affiliation with the Montreal Expos. The club was renamed to the San Jose Expos.

== Teams ==
1982 California League
Division	Team	City	MLB Affiliate	Stadium
North	Lodi Dodgers	Lodi, California	Los Angeles Dodgers	Lawrence Park
North	Modesto A's	Modesto, California	Oakland Athletics	Del Webb Field
North	Redwood Pioneers	Rohnert Park, California	California Angels	Rohnert Park Stadium
North	Reno Padres	Reno, Nevada	San Diego Padres	Moana Stadium
North	Stockton Ports	Stockton, California	Milwaukee Brewers	Billy Hebert Field
South	Bakersfield Mariners	Bakersfield, California	Seattle Mariners	Sam Lynn Ballpark
South	Fresno Giants	Fresno, California	San Francisco Giants	John Euless Park
South	Salinas Spurs	Salinas, California	Chicago Cubs	Salinas Municipal Stadium
South	San Jose Expos	San Jose, California	Montreal Expos	San Jose Municipal Stadium
South	Visalia Oaks	Visalia, California	Minnesota Twins	Recreation Park

== Map of teams ==
North Division South Division

== Regular season ==
=== Summary ===
- The Modesto A's finished with the best record in the regular season for the first time since 1971.

=== Standings ===
North Division
Team	Win	Loss	%	GB
Modesto A's	94	46	.671	–
Stockton Ports	81	57	.587	12
Reno Padres	70	68	.507	23
Redwood Pioneers	65	75	.464	29
Lodi Dodgers	58	82	.414	36
South Division
Team	Win	Loss	%	GB
Visalia Oaks	82	58	.586	–
Salinas Spurs	68	72	.486	14
San Jose Expos	66	74	.471	16
Bakersfield Mariners	64	76	.457	18
Fresno Giants	50	90	.357	32

== League Leaders ==
=== Batting leaders ===
Stat	Player	Total
AVG	Kevin McReynolds, Reno Padres	.376
H	Ozzie Guillen, Reno Padres	183
R	Ozzie Guillen, Reno Padres	103
2B	Ricky Nelson, Bakersfield Mariners	36
3B	Carlos Ponce, Stockton Ports	13
HR	Kevin McReynolds, Reno Padres	28
RBI	Ricky Nelson, Bakersfield Mariners	101
SB	Mike Felder, Stockton Ports	92

=== Pitching leaders ===
Stat	Player	Total
W	Mike Warren, Stockton / Modesto	19
ERA	Mark Ferguson, Modesto A's	1.77
CG	Mark Ferguson, Modesto A's	20
SHO	Mark Ferguson, Modesto A's	8
SV	Ronald Sylvia, Redwood Pioneers	25
IP	Curt Young, Modesto A's	205.0
SO	Tim Conroy, Modesto A's	184

== Playoffs ==
- Both the Modesto A's and Visalia Oaks finished in first place in each half of the season, therefore earning byes to the finals.
- The final round was extended to a best-of-seven series.
- The Modesto A's won their sixth California League championship, as they defeated the Visalia Oaks in six games.

=== Playoff bracket ===
Division finals
N1	Modesto	bye
S1	Visalia	bye

Finals
N1	Modesto	4
S1	Visalia	2

== Awards ==
California League awards
Award name	Recipient
Most Valuable Player	Kevin McReynolds, Reno Padres

== See also ==
- 1982 Major League Baseball season
