= Lance McCullers =

American baseball player (born 1964)

- Pitcher
- Born: March 8, 1964 (age 62); Tampa, Florida, U.S.
- Batted: Switch Threw: Right

MLB debut
- August 12, 1985, for the San Diego Padres

Last MLB appearance
- June 4, 1992, for the Texas Rangers

MLB statistics
- Win–loss record: 28–31
- Earned run average: 3.25
- Strikeouts: 442
- Stats at Baseball Reference

Teams
- San Diego Padres (1985–1988); New York Yankees (1989–1990); Detroit Tigers (1990); Texas Rangers (1992)

Lance Graye McCullers Sr. (born March 8, 1964) is an American former professional baseball pitcher. He played all or part of seven seasons in Major League Baseball (MLB) for the San Diego Padres, New York Yankees, Detroit Tigers, and Texas Rangers between 1985 and 1992.

McCullers was an offensive lineman and defensive tackle while attending Tampa Catholic High School, but switched to baseball following an injury. He was selected by the Philadelphia Phillies during the 1982 MLB draft and traded to the Padres in 1983. In the 1984 and 1985 seasons he played for the Miami Marlins, Beaumont Golden Gators, and Las Vegas Stars.

McCullers was promoted to the Padres after Goose Gossage suffered an injury. He was traded to the Yankees and then to the Tigers. He was diagnosed with blood clots in his throwing arm in 1990, and doctors told him to not pitch again. However, he returned to baseball following surgery and played for the Oklahoma City 89ers before the Texas Rangers bought out his contract. He became a free agent and signed a minor league contract with the Los Angeles Dodgers where he pitched for the Albuquerque Dukes and Calgary Cannons.

== Career ==
=== Early career ===
McCullers attended Chamberlain High School in Tampa, Florida, and transferred to Tampa Catholic High School in 1981. He played football as an offensive lineman and defensive tackle until he experienced an arm injury and decided to focus on baseball. Playing for the school's baseball team with Tino Martinez and Rich Monteleone, Tampa Catholic won the Class 3A state championship in 1982. McCullers committed to attend the University of Miami to play college baseball for the Miami Hurricanes. The Philadelphia Phillies selected him in the second round, with the 41st overall selection, of the 1982 MLB draft. He signed with the Phillies and reported to the Helena Phillies of the Rookie-level Pioneer League. In 1983, McCullers pitched for the Spartanburg Phillies of the Class A South Atlantic League. He had a 9–4 win–loss record and a 3.40 earned run average (ERA).

On September 20, 1983, the Phillies sent McCullers, Darren Burroughs, Marty Decker, and Ed Wojna to the San Diego Padres to complete an earlier trade made on August 31, 1983, in which the Phillies sent players to be named later to the Padres for Sixto Lezcano. McCullers began the 1984 season with the Miami Marlins of the Class A-Advanced Florida State League and had a 6–4 win–loss record with a 2.40 ERA for Miami before was promoted to the Beaumont Golden Gators of the Class AA Texas League on July 16. He had a 4–1 record and a 2.11 ERA for Beaumont. McCullers began the 1985 season with the Las Vegas Stars of the Class AAA Pacific Coast League (PCL).

Due to an injury to Goose Gossage, the Padres promoted McCullers to the major leagues as a relief pitcher in August 1985. He made his major league debut with the Padres on August 12, 1985, and his teammates started calling him "Baby Goose". McCullers had a 2.31 ERA in 21 appearances for the Padres. He started the 1986 season as a setup man to Gossage, but was shifted into the starting rotation in July in place of Mark Thurmond. He returned to pitching in a relief role in August. In 1987, McCullers led the Padres with 16 saves and all National League relief pitchers with 123 1/3 innings pitched. The Padres traded Gossage before the 1988 season and manager Larry Bowa named him the new closer. McCullers struggled and was demoted to a setup reliever for new closer Mark Davis.

On October 24, 1988, the Padres traded McCullers, Stan Jefferson, and Jimmy Jones to the New York Yankees for Jack Clark and Pat Clements. McCullers struggled with his consistency early in the season, recording a 6.27 ERA in June and a 9.00 ERA in July. McCullers began to improve his performance when Dave Righetti helped him with his slider. McCullers got more regular work after the Yankees replaced Dallas Green as manager with Bucky Dent, and he finished the 1989 season with a 4.57 ERA.

McCullers pitched infrequently for the Yankees in the 1990 season. On June 4, 1990, the Yankees traded McCullers and Clay Parker to the Detroit Tigers for Matt Nokes. McCullers had pitched to a 3.60 ERA in 11 games for the Yankees before the trade.

=== Blood clot and comeback ===
In July 1990, McCullers was diagnosed with a blood clot in his throwing arm. He spent five days in the hospital while doctors attempted to dissolve the clot, which doctors determined was not able to travel to his heart, which could cause a stroke. Continued numbness and loss of pulse in his hand led to another inpatient stay in the hospital and surgery to remove the clot from his wrist. Doctors told McCullers that pieces of the clot were in his hand and that he should not pitch again or the clots could force him to require amputation of a finger or the hand. His contract expired after the 1990 season and McCullers was out of baseball in 1991.

After having a successful surgery in September 1991, McCullers attended a tryout with the Texas Rangers in 1992. He received an invitation to spring training with the Rangers, but did not make their Opening Day roster. He began the 1992 season with the Oklahoma City 89ers of the Class AAA American Association. In May, the Rangers purchased his contract, promoting him to the major leagues. He earned the win in his first appearance with Texas. In June, McCullers refused an outright assignment to Oklahoma City, becoming a free agent. He signed a minor league contract with the Los Angeles Dodgers in July, and pitched for the Albuquerque Dukes of the PCL. In 1993, he pitched for the Calgary Cannons of the PCL.

== Personal life ==
McCullers's wife, Stacie, played tennis for Louisiana State University. Their son, Lance McCullers Jr., pitched for the Houston Astros. McCullers managed his son in Amateur Athletic Union baseball before he began his professional career.

The McCullers family owns L&M Trees, a pumpkin and Christmas tree supplier based in Lutz, Florida. McCullers and his siblings took over operation of the business after their father died in 2000.
