= Dale Sveum =

American baseball player and manager (born 1963)

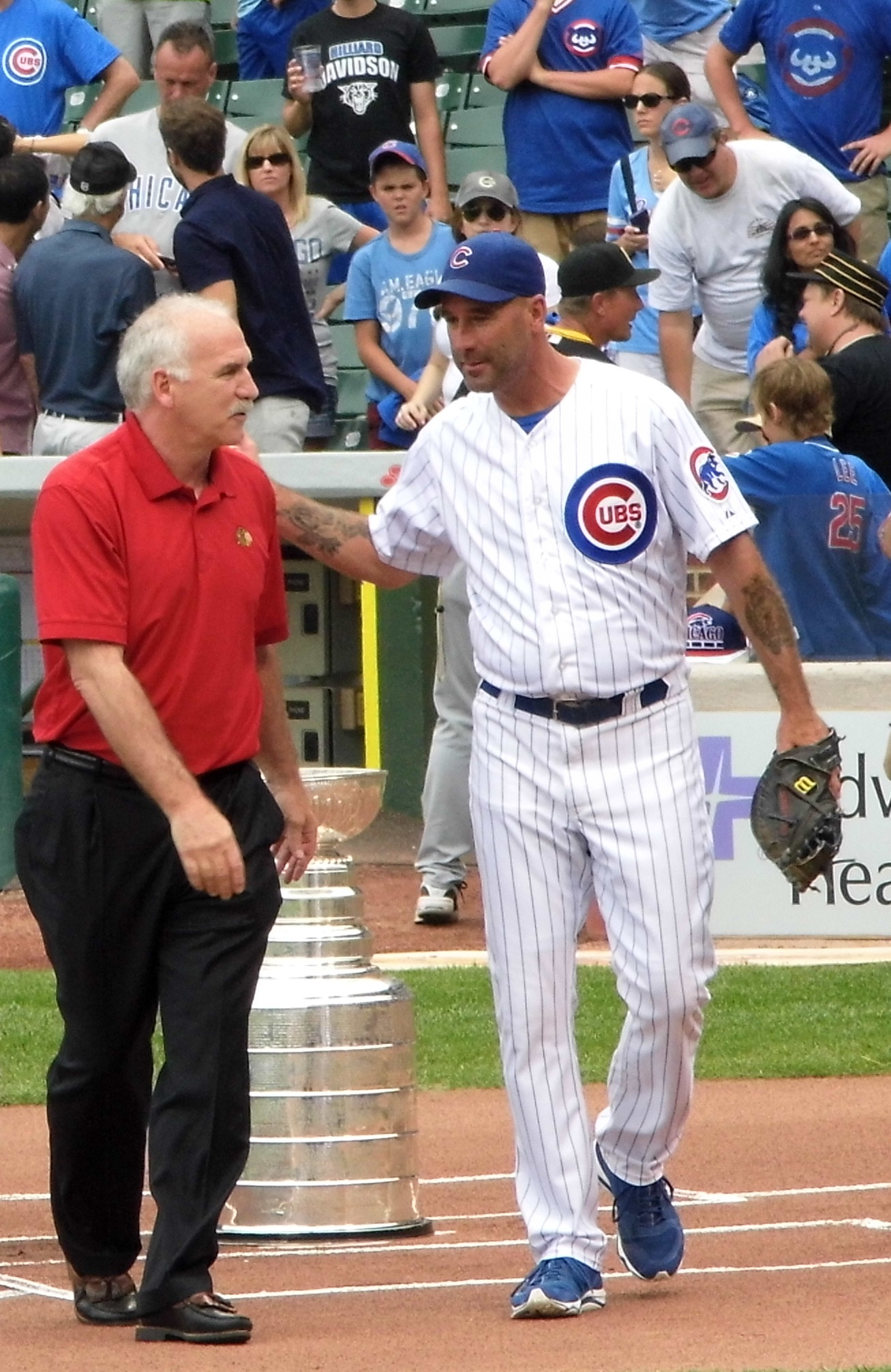
- Sveum (right) as Cubs manager in 2013 with Blackhawks coach Joel Quenneville
- Shortstop / Third baseman / Manager
- Born: November 23, 1963 (age 62); Richmond, California, U.S.
- Batted: Switch Threw: Right

MLB debut
- May 12, 1986, for the Milwaukee Brewers

Last MLB appearance
- October 3, 1999, for the Pittsburgh Pirates

MLB statistics
- Batting average: .236
- Home runs: 69
- Runs batted in: 340
- Managerial record: 134–202
- Winning %: .399
- Stats at Baseball Reference
- Managerial record at Baseball Reference

Teams
- As player: Milwaukee Brewers (1986–1988, 1990–1991); Philadelphia Phillies (1992); Chicago White Sox (1992); Oakland Athletics (1993); Seattle Mariners (1994); Pittsburgh Pirates (1996–1997); New York Yankees (1998); Pittsburgh Pirates (1999); As manager: Milwaukee Brewers (2008); Chicago Cubs (2012–2013); As coach: Boston Red Sox (2004–2005); Milwaukee Brewers (2006–2011); Kansas City Royals (2014–2019)

Career highlights and awards
- 2× World Series champion (2004, 2015)

Dale Curtis Sveum (/sweɪm/ SWAYM; born November 23, 1963) is an American former Major League Baseball (MLB) player and manager. He most recently served as the bench coach for the Kansas City Royals. As a player, Sveum saw action in 12 major league seasons between 1986 and 1999. He was a member of the Milwaukee Brewers, Philadelphia Phillies, Chicago White Sox, Oakland Athletics, Seattle Mariners, Pittsburgh Pirates, and New York Yankees.

Following his playing career, Sveum managed in minor league baseball for several seasons before becoming an MLB coach. Sveum briefly served as manager of the Brewers in 2008 during his tenure as hitting coach for the team. He was later named manager of the Cubs after the 2011 season and served for two seasons.

== Playing career ==
During his time at Pinole Valley High School, Sveum was recognized as an All-State and All-American quarterback, in addition to playing baseball and basketball. Drafted by the Milwaukee Brewers in the first round (25th pick) of the 1982 amateur draft, he went on to play 12 seasons in MLB, hitting .236 with 69 home runs.

Arguably, Sveum's finest season came in 1987, when he hit 25 home runs and drove in 95 runs, mostly as the Brewers' ninth hitter in the lineup. One of his personal highlights came early in the season, when he hit a walk-off home run at County Stadium to give Milwaukee a 6–4 victory over the Texas Rangers. This victory, which came on April 19 (Easter Sunday), led the Brewers to a 12–0 record on the season.

On July 17, 1987, Sveum totaled three homers and six RBIs during a 12–2 thumping of the California Angels.

On September 3, 1988, Sveum was involved in a severe collision with fellow Brewer Darryl Hamilton where Sveum's left leg was so badly broken he did not play again in 1988 and also sat out the entire 1989 MLB season, while seeing action only in 17 games in the minor leagues.

In his first three major league seasons, Sveum's lowest yearly batting average was .242. Following his return to the majors in 1990, he only batted over .241 twice in parts of nine seasons.

During his career, Sveum had the distinction of playing for five separate managers who would (at some point in their careers) win a league Manager of the Year Award:

- Tony La Russa (1983, 1988, 1992, 2002), in Oakland
- Jim Leyland (1990, 1992, 2006), in Pittsburgh
- Gene Lamont (1993), with the Chicago White Sox
- Lou Piniella (1995, 2001, 2008), in Seattle
- Joe Torre (1996, 1998), in New York

== Coaching career ==
=== Pittsburgh ===
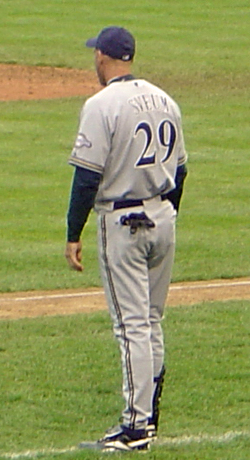
Sveum as third base coach for the Brewers in 2006

Prior to coaching in Milwaukee, Sveum managed the Double A team, The Altoona Curve, in the Pittsburgh Pirates organization from 2001–2003, compiling a 213–211 record. In 2003, Baseball America tabbed Sveum as the best potential MLB manager in the Eastern League.

=== Boston Red Sox ===
Sveum was on the coaching staff of the Boston Red Sox from 2004–05 as third base coach under manager (and former Brewers teammate) Terry Francona. Following Sveum's second season in Boston, he left the Red Sox to rejoin Milwaukee as the team's bench coach.

=== Milwaukee Brewers ===
On October 30, 2007, Sveum switched positions on the staff and became the team's third base coach.

On September 15, 2008, he was named interim manager of the Milwaukee Brewers after manager Ned Yost was fired with the team at 83–67, having lost eleven of their last fourteen games while being tied for the Wild Card spot. Sveum led the team to a 7–5 record to close out the 2008 regular season, which was enough for the Brewers to make the playoffs for the first time since their World Series run in 1982. Under Sveum's leadership, the Brewers lost the 2008 NLDS to the Philadelphia Phillies in 4 games.

After the season ended, newly-extended general manager Doug Melvin announced Sveum was out of the running for the managerial spot and hitting coach Jim Skaalen was fired. Eventually, Ken Macha took over the Brewers for the 2009 season while Sveum stayed on as the team's hitting coach.

=== Chicago Cubs ===
On November 16, 2011 the Chicago Cubs offered Sveum their vacant managerial position. The following day, on November 17, 2011, he accepted the offer to become the new manager of the Chicago Cubs, and was introduced on November 18, 2011. Sveum was fired on September 30, 2013 after posting a record of 127–197 in two seasons with the Cubs. On August 16, 2017, Sveum received a World Series ring from the team.

=== Kansas City Royals ===
On October 3, 2013, the Kansas City Royals announced they had hired Sveum as a coach and infield instructor, reuniting him with Yost, the team's manager. On May 29, 2014, the Royals promoted Sveum to hitting coach in an effort to improve a lackluster offensive start to the season.

He became the team's bench coach after the 2017 season. Sveum departed the Royals when Yost retired from the team after the 2019 season.

=== Managerial record ===
Team	From	To	Regular season record			Post–season record		
Team	From	To	W	L	Win %	W	L	Win %
Milwaukee Brewers	2008	2008	7	5	.583	1	3	.250
Chicago Cubs	2012	2013	127	197	.392	0	0	–
Total			134	202	.399	1	3	.250

== Personal life ==
Sveum's cousin is former MLB All-Star John Olerud.

Sporting positions
Preceded by Mike Cubbage	Boston Red Sox third base coach 2004–2005	Succeeded by DeMarlo Hale
Preceded by Rich Donnelly	Milwaukee Brewers third base coach 2006	Succeeded by Nick Leyva
Preceded by Robin Yount	Milwaukee Brewers bench coach 2007	Succeeded by Ted Simmons
Preceded by Nick Leyva	Milwaukee Brewers third base coach 2008	Succeeded by Garth Iorg
Preceded by Jim Skaalen	Milwaukee Brewers hitting coach 2009–2011	Succeeded by Johnny Narron
Preceded by Mike Quade	Chicago Cubs Manager; 2012–2013	Succeeded by Rick Renteria
Preceded by Jack Maloof	Kansas City Royals hitting coach 2014–2017	Succeeded by Terry Bradshaw
Preceded by Don Wakamatsu	Kansas City Royals bench coach 2018–present	Succeeded by current
