= Ed Wojna =

American baseball player (born 1960)

- Pitcher
- Born: August 20, 1960 (age 64); Bridgeport, Connecticut, U.S.
- Batted: Right Threw: Right

MLB debut
- June 16, 1985, for the San Diego Padres

Last MLB appearance
- September 30, 1989, for the Cleveland Indians

MLB statistics
- Win–loss record: 4–10
- Earned run average: 4.62
- Strikeouts: 60
- Stats at Baseball Reference

Teams
- San Diego Padres (1985–1987); Cleveland Indians (1989)

Edward David Wojna (pronounced Woah-shuh-nuh) (born August 20, 1960) is an American former professional baseball pitcher. He played parts of four seasons in Major League Baseball (MLB) with the San Diego Padres and Cleveland Indians. Wojna is of Polish descent.

== Early career ==
Wojna attended Masuk High School and then played at Indian River Junior College. He was drafted by the Philadelphia Phillies. He was traded by the Philadelphia Phillies with Marty Decker, Darren Burroughs and Lance McCullers to the San Diego Padres on August 31, 1983, as part of trade in which the Padres gave up Sixto Lezcano and a player to be named later (Steve Fireovid).

== Major league career ==
Wojna made his debut with the Padres in 1985, but was seldom used on a very strong pitching staff. In 1986 he enjoyed his best season by going 2–2 with a 3.23 ERA. The highlight of the season, and his career, came on September 11, 1986, at Jack Murphy Stadium in San Diego. That night he hurled a 9 inning complete game and defeated the Atlanta Braves 9 to 1. He allowed only three hits in the game (two singles by Ken Griffey and one by Rafael Ramírez) and only one unearned run.

During the 1987 season Wojna did not pitch well and was up and down between San Diego and their Triple-A Pacific Coast League team, the Las Vegas Stars. He was traded to the Chicago White Sox after the season, spending a year in their organization before being traded to the Indians. His last appearance in the major leagues came in 1989 out of the Indians bullpen for a handful of games. He spent 1990, his last professional season, with the Tacoma Tigers in the Oakland Athletics organization.

For his career Wojna won 4 games, lost 10, and had a 4.62 ERA over 132.1 innings. He pitched in 36 games and started 20 of them.

== Last name humor ==
- The Padres' broadcasting crew of Jerry Coleman and Dave Campbell often had trouble with Wojna's Polish name. Fellow Padre teammates Garry Templeton and Marvell Wynne pronounced his name as "Wash-nuh" despite manager Steve Boros' attempts to teach them otherwise.
- In the Polish language, "wojna" means war.

== Other ==
According to a story in Beckett Baseball Card Monthly in June 1986, a production error by Topps Baseball Cards caused his card to appear ten times more often than any other card in the 1986 Topps wax packs.

== Sources ==
- "Ed Wojna Retrosheet stats". Retrosheet.org.
- 1987 San Diego Padres Media Guide
