= 1983 National League Championship Series =

15th edition of Major League Baseball's National League Championship Series

Team (Wins)	Manager(s)	Season
Philadelphia Phillies (3)	Paul Owens	90–72, .556, GA: 6
Los Angeles Dodgers (1)	Tommy Lasorda	91–71, .562, GA: 3
- Dates: October 4–8
- MVP: Gary Matthews (Philadelphia)
- Umpires: Terry Tata; Dick Stello; John McSherry; Lee Weyer; Doug Harvey (crew chief); Jerry Crawford

Broadcast
- Television: NBC (national broadcast); KTTV (LAD); WTAF-TV (PHI)
- TV announcers: NBC: Vin Scully and Joe Garagiola; KTTV: Ross Porter and Jerry Doggett; WTAF-TV: Harry Kalas, Andy Musser and Richie Ashburn
- Radio: CBS
- Radio announcers: Duke Snider and Jerry Coleman

The 1983 National League Championship Series was a best-of-five matchup in Major League Baseball’s 1983 postseason between the West Division champion Los Angeles Dodgers and the East Division champion Philadelphia Phillies. It was the 15th NLCS in all. The Phillies beat the Dodgers, three games to one, and would go on to lose the World Series to the Baltimore Orioles.

== Background ==
The Phillies post-season roster had nine players 30 years of age or over and three rookies, Charlie Hudson, Kevin Gross, and Juan Samuel. The Dodgers entered the series as favorites after winning 11 of 12 games against the Phillies in the regular season. The Dodgers had shut out the Phillies five times, allowed only 15 runs total, and held Phillies hitters to a .187 batting average. However, Philadelphia came into the NLCS torrid, having gone 23–8 in September/October. They were nicknamed the "Wheeze Kids" because of the numerous veteran players on the team and it was also a play off the 1950 National League pennant winning Phillies, who had been nicknamed the "Whiz Kids", due to their youth.

This was the third NLCS meeting between the Dodgers and Phillies, with Los Angeles winning both prior meetings in four games in 1977 and 1978.

== Summary ==
=== Philadelphia Phillies vs. Los Angeles Dodgers ===
Philadelphia won the series, 3–1.

Game	Date	Score	Location	Time	Attendance
1	October 4	Philadelphia Phillies – 1, Los Angeles Dodgers – 0	Dodger Stadium	2:17	55,254
2	October 5	Philadelphia Phillies – 1, Los Angeles Dodgers – 4	Dodger Stadium	2:44	55,967
3	October 7	Los Angeles Dodgers – 2, Philadelphia Phillies – 7	Veterans Stadium	2:51	53,490
4	October 8	Los Angeles Dodgers – 2, Philadelphia Phillies – 7	Veterans Stadium	2:50	64,494

== Game summaries ==
=== Game 1 ===
Tuesday, October 4, 1983, at Dodger Stadium in Los Angeles, California

Team	1	2	3	4	5	6	7	8	9	R	H	E
Philadelphia	1	0	0	0	0	0	0	0	0	1	5	1
Los Angeles	0	0	0	0	0	0	0	0	0	0	7	0
WP: Steve Carlton (1–0) LP: Jerry Reuss (0–1) Sv: Al Holland (1); Home runs: PHI: Mike Schmidt (1); LAD: None

Mike Schmidt hit a two-out homer off Jerry Reuss in the first, and the Phillies made it hold up as Steve Carlton and Al Holland combined to scatter seven Dodger hits. Los Angeles mounted only two threats; the first came in the sixth, when Steve Sax singled, Bill Russell sacrificed Sax to second, and Sax went to third on a Carlton wild pitch. Carlton retired the last two hitters, however. The second came in the eighth, when singles by Sax and Dusty Baker and a walk to Pedro Guerrero loaded the bases, chasing Carlton. Holland came in and retired Mike Marshall for the third out and ultimately finished the game.

=== Game 2 ===
Wednesday, October 5, 1983, at Dodger Stadium in Los Angeles, California

Team	1	2	3	4	5	6	7	8	9	R	H	E
Philadelphia	0	1	0	0	0	0	0	0	0	1	7	2
Los Angeles	1	0	0	0	2	0	0	1	X	4	6	1
WP: Fernando Valenzuela (1–0) LP: John Denny (0–1) Sv: Tom Niedenfuer (1); Home runs: PHI: Gary Matthews (1); LAD: None

The Dodgers drew first blood with a Ken Landreaux RBI single in the first with two on, but Gary Matthews tied it for the Phils in the second with a home run off Fernando Valenzuela. Valenzuela and eventual NL Cy Young Award winner John Denny would continue dueling until the Dodger half of the fifth. Valenzuela led off and reached third when Garry Maddox misplayed a fly ball. However, with one out, he was thrown out at the plate on a Greg Brock ground ball (Brock reached first). Seemingly out of the inning, Denny walked Dusty Baker and then gave up a tie-breaking two-run triple to Pedro Guerrero.

The Dodgers' final run came in the eighth when Bill Russell walked with two outs, stole second, and scored on an RBI single by catcher Jack Fimple. Valenzuela and Tom Niedenfuer would combine to scatter seven hits for the win.

=== Game 3 ===
Friday, October 7, 1983, at Veterans Stadium in Philadelphia, Pennsylvania

Team	1	2	3	4	5	6	7	8	9	R	H	E
Los Angeles	0	0	0	2	0	0	0	0	0	2	4	0
Philadelphia	0	2	1	1	2	0	1	0	X	7	9	1
WP: Charles Hudson (1–0) LP: Bob Welch (0–1); Home runs: LAD: Mike Marshall (1); PHI: Gary Matthews (2)

With the series shifting to Philadelphia, Dodgers starter Bob Welch was pulled from the game in the second after walking two with one out. A wild pitch and passed ball by reliever Alejandro Pena scored the game's first run. After Bo Diaz walked, Ivan de Jesus's RBI groundout made it 2–0 Phillies. Next inning, Joe Lefebvre's sacrifice fly with two on made it 3–0 Phillies. In the top of the fourth, rookie Charles Hudson allowed a leadoff single, then a two-out two-run homer by Mike Marshall to cut the Phillies' lead to 3–2. However, Hudson only allowed two other hits and pitched a complete game. Gary Matthews's leadoff home run in the bottom of the inning extended the Phillies' lead to 4–2. Next inning, Dodgers reliever Rick Honeycutt allowed a one-out single and double, then Matthews's two-run single off Joe Beckwith made it 6–2 Phillies. Matthews hit another RBI single in the seventh off Pat Zachry in the seventh that capped the scoring at 7–2 Phillies, giving them a 2–1 series lead.

=== Game 4 ===
Saturday, October 8, 1983, at Veterans Stadium in Philadelphia, Pennsylvania

Team	1	2	3	4	5	6	7	8	9	R	H	E
Los Angeles	0	0	0	1	0	0	0	1	0	2	10	0
Philadelphia	3	0	0	0	2	2	0	0	X	7	13	1
WP: Steve Carlton (2–0) LP: Jerry Reuss (0–2); Home runs: LAD: Dusty Baker (1); PHI: Gary Matthews (3), Sixto Lezcano (1)

Series MVP Gary Matthews hit a three-run homer in the first off Jerry Reuss after two straight two-out singles. Dusty Baker's leadoff home run in the fourth off Steve Carlton put the Dodgers on the board. In the fifth, Pete Rose hit a leadoff single and scored on Mike Schmidt's double to knock Reuss out of the game. Schmidt then moved to third on a groundout and after an intentional walk, scored on Garry Maddox's fielder's choice off Joe Beckwith. Sixto Lezcano added a two-run homer in the sixth off Rick Honeycutt after a two-out single. Baker drove in the Dodgers' other run in the eighth with an RBI single off Ron Reed after a leadoff single. One Dodger fan could be heard screaming "It's a whole new ballgame!" He was immediately pelted with beer, popcorn, and peanut shells by the Phillies faithful. Alas, the Dodger rally was short-lived as Steve Carlton pitched his second win, scattering 10 hits with relief help from Reed and Al Holland. The Phillies moved to their second World Series in four seasons.

Out of the 14 postseason series that Pete Rose played in, this was the only one in which he did not record an RBI. He did hit well in the series, compiling six hits and one walk in 17 plate appearances. Oddly enough, in the 13 series in which Rose had an RBI, he never drove in more than two runs in any of them.

== Composite box ==
1983 NLCS (3–1): Philadelphia Phillies over Los Angeles Dodgers

Team	1	2	3	4	5	6	7	8	9	R	H	E
Philadelphia Phillies	4	3	1	1	4	2	1	0	0	16	34	5
Los Angeles Dodgers	1	0	0	3	2	0	0	2	0	8	27	1
Total attendance: 223,914 Average attendance: 55,979

== Broadcasting ==
1983 marked the last time that local telecasts of League Championship Series games were allowed. In 1982, Major League Baseball recognized a problem with this due to the emergence of cable superstations such as WTBS in Atlanta and WGN-TV in Chicago. When TBS tried to petition for the right to do a "local" Braves broadcast of the 1982 NLCS, Major League Baseball got a Philadelphia federal court to ban them on the grounds that as a cable superstation, TBS couldn't have a nationwide telecast competing with ABC's.
