= Jerry Mumphrey =

American baseball player (born 1952)

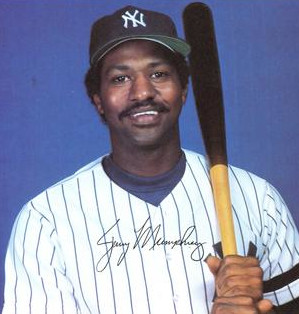
- Mumphrey in 1981
- Outfielder
- Born: September 9, 1952 (age 74); Tyler, Texas, U.S.
- Batted: Switch Threw: Right

MLB debut
- September 10, 1974, for the St. Louis Cardinals

Last MLB appearance
- September 30, 1988, for the Chicago Cubs

MLB statistics
- Batting average: .289
- Home runs: 70
- Runs batted in: 575
- Stats at Baseball Reference

Teams
- St. Louis Cardinals (1974–1979); San Diego Padres (1980); New York Yankees (1981–1983); Houston Astros (1983–1985); Chicago Cubs (1986–1988)

Career highlights and awards
- All-Star (1984)

Jerry Wayne Mumphrey (born September 9, 1952) is an American former professional baseball outfielder. He played in Major League Baseball for the St. Louis Cardinals (1974–79), San Diego Padres (1980), New York Yankees (1981–83), Houston Astros (1983–85) and Chicago Cubs (1986–88). Mumphrey was an All-Star in 1984.

== Early years ==
Mumphrey was drafted by the Cardinals in the fourth round of the 1971 Major League Baseball draft out of Chapel Hill High School in Tyler, Texas. Over four seasons in the Cards' farm system, he batted .288 with 15 home runs, 126 runs batted in and 234 runs scored.

Mumphrey made his major league debut on September 10, 1974, the day after his 22nd birthday, as a pinch runner for Keith Hernandez. He made three appearances as a pinch runner before getting his first plate appearance. Playing the Chicago Cubs, he reached on an error by second baseman Billy Grabarkewitz, and came around to score on Marc Hill's bases loaded walk.

He returned to the minors for the 1975 season, batting .285 with 44 stolen bases for the Tulsa Oilers. He was called up again that September, and got his first major league hit in his first at bat. He also scored Héctor Cruz on the play for his first major league RBI. Overall, he went 6-for-16 with the one RBI and two runs scored.

== St. Louis Cardinals ==
He was batting .338 in nineteen games for Tulsa in 1976 when he was brought up to fill in for center fielder Bake McBride, who was having knee trouble. After going 0-for his first-11, Mumphrey put together a modest eight game hitting streak. Playing the San Francisco Giants on July 6, Mumphrey went 4-for-5 with three runs and an RBI. The next day, Giants pitcher John Montefusco faked a throw to third, and spun around to pick Mumphrey off first base. Instead of being tagged out, Mumphrey got in a rundown, allowing Mike Tyson to score from third. Mumphrey was also safe at second. On September 17, he hit his first major league home run and only home run of the season off the Montreal Expos' Gerry Hannahs. His rookie year, he batted .258 with 26 RBIs and 51 runs scored. His 22 stolen bases were second to Cardinals legend Lou Brock's 56.

On June 15, 1977, the Cardinals traded McBride and minor league pitcher Steve Waterbury to the Philadelphia Phillies for pitcher Tom Underwood and outfielders Rick Bosetti and Dane Iorg. Originally, the center field job fell to Bosetti and switch hitter Tony Scott. Despite not having a regular starting position, Mumphrey saw regular play as a corner outfielder. He batted .305 with thirteen doubles and seven triples through the All-Star break to become the Cardinals' center fielder for the second half of the season.

The 1977 Cardinals improved by eleven games under new manager Vern Rapp, but lacked power. Their 96 home runs on the season were second to last in the majors to the New York Mets' 88. They began the 1978 season 15–28, and only had twenty home runs on the season when they acquired power hitter George Hendrick from the San Diego Padres on May 26.

Mumphrey was only batting .170 at the time of the acquisition. Upon Hendrick's arrival, Mumphrey began hitting. He batted .290 over the remainder of the season to end the 1978 season with a .262 average. On August 5, he went 3-for-4 with his first home run of the season against the Mets. His second home run of the season beat the Houston Astros on August 30.

A Spring training injury kept Mumphrey out of the line up until game eleven of the 1979 season. He had just one hit in his first fourteen at bats before a 3-for-4 performance against the Atlanta Braves on May 12. In an August 10 doubleheader with the Cubs, Mumphrey went 5-for-9 with four RBIs and an inside-the-park home run.

As the Cards' fourth outfielder, Mumphrey appeared in 124 games, and made 375 plate appearances in 1979. Believing that he deserved more playing time, Mumphrey requested a trade. On December 7, he and John Denny were traded to the Cleveland Indians for Bobby Bonds. Two months later, the Indians sent him to the San Diego Padres for Bob Owchinko and Jim Wilhelm.

== San Diego Padres ==
A pulled muscle in his right leg toward the end of spring training caused Mumphrey to get off to a slow start in 1980, however, by the beginning of June, Mumphrey was batting third, and having a career year. He was second to Gene Richards (.301) with a .298 batting average, and along with Richards and Ozzie Smith, he was part of the first trio from the same team in MLB history to each steal fifty or more bases in a season.

He also led major league center fielders with eleven errors, the most impactful of which came on August 15 in an extra innings game with the Astros. With two outs in the twentieth inning, Mumphrey misplayed a Terry Puhl fly ball into a three base error that scored two runs. After the season "Trader" Jack McKeon sent Mumphrey and John Pacella to the New York Yankees for Ruppert Jones, Joe Lefebvre and minor league pitchers Tim Lollar and Chris Welsh.

== New York Yankees ==
Batting second and playing center, Mumphrey batted .322 and matched his career high home run total (four) in the first half of the strike shortened season. When play resumed, Mumphrey batted .290 with 19 RBI and 24 runs scored.

The Yankees won the first half of the split season format instituted for the 1981 season. After going 2-for-5 with a run scored in game one of the 1981 American League Division Series with the Milwaukee Brewers, Mumphrey went hitless in the remaining four games. He reached on an error and scored the Yankees' only run in game four.

In the 1981 American League Championship Series with the Oakland Athletics, he went 6-for-12 with three walks in the Yankees' three-game sweep.

Mumphrey singled and came around to score on Bob Watson's home run in his first at-bat of the 1981 World Series against the Los Angeles Dodgers. In his next at-bat, he singled, stole second, then scored the Yankees' fourth run of the game. An 0-for-8 "slump" that followed got him benched for games four and five, both won by the Dodgers. He returned for game six, got a single in the third, but struck out in the final inning of the Dodgers' World Series victory. Overall, Mumphrey went 11-for-48 for a .229 average in his only trip to the postseason. He scored six runs with no RBI.

Despite the fact that the Yankees fell to 79–83 and fifth place in the American League East in 1982, Mumphrey set several career highs. Facing the A's July 15–18, Mumphrey went 6-for-15 with five RBI and four runs in the four-game sweep. The Yankees swept the California Angels later in the month. Mumphrey went 6-for-14 with two home runs. On September 29, against the Indians, Mumphrey went 3-for-5 with two doubles, a triple, four RBI and three runs scored. All told, he batted over .300 for the second year in a row with a career high nine home runs and 76 runs scored. His 68 RBI were second on the team to Dave Winfield's 106.

The Yankees signed free agent outfielder Steve Kemp before the 1983 season. Wanting more power in his line up, manager Billy Martin began using Kemp in left and Winfield in center when the Yankees faced left handed pitchers. Mumphrey was displeased with his playing time with New York. On August 10, he was traded to the Astros for Omar Moreno.

== Houston Astros ==
Starting in center field again, Mumphrey ignited one of the Astros' greatest comebacks of the season shortly after joining his new club. On August 23, with the Astros trailing the Pirates 5–1, Mumphrey led off the ninth inning with a single off starter John Candelaria. Following Alan Ashby's single, Denny Walling hit a three-run home run to chase Candelaria from the game. The Astros then scored two more off the Pirates' bullpen to win, 6–5. The next day, Mumphrey went 3-for-4 with two doubles, two RBI and a run scored in the Astros' 10–4 victory over the Pirates. On September 27, Mumphrey went 4-for-5, and broke a 5–5 tie with a three-run home run against the Padres. Mumphrey batted .336 over the rest of the season with Houston.

On May 14, 1984, Mumphrey singled in the bottom of the ninth off Pirates closer Kent Tekulve for his one thousandth major league hit. Going into the All-Star break, he batted .282 with six home runs and 52 RBI to be selected by Paul Owens' as the Astros' sole representative on the National League All-Star squad. He was struck out by the Detroit Tigers' Jack Morris to end the fourth inning in his only at-bat. He batted .301 after the break to bring his average to .290 for the season. He matched his career high with nine home runs (tied with Terry Puhl for 2nd most on the team to José Cruz's 12) and set a new career high with 83 RBI (2nd to Cruz's 95).

After beginning the 1985 season in center, Mumphrey was shifted to right field in the beginning of July with Kevin Bass assuming center field duties. After the season, he was traded to the Cubs for Billy Hatcher and a player to be named later.

== Chicago Cubs ==
The Cubs' intention to use Mumphrey as a fourth outfielder was made clear immediately. Shortly after his December 1985 acquisition, Cubs General Manager Dallas Green said, "By acquiring Jerry Mumphrey, we got someone who can play three outfield positions and play all three very well."

As a fourth outfielder, he played 111 games and batted .304 in 1986 He was also 10-for-29 as a pinch hitter with one home run and eight RBI.

He batted a career high .333 in 1987, and set a new career high with 13 home runs. He was 12-for-35 with two home runs and 12 RBI as a pinch hitter. In 1988, Mumphrey made 57 plate appearances as a pinch hitter and only appeared on the field four times. He had nine hits in 66 at-bats for a .136 average. He retired at the end of the season.

== Career statistics ==
Years	Games	PA	AB	R	H	2B	3B	HR	RBI	SB	BB	SO	Avg.	OBP	SLG	OPS	Fld%	WAR
15	1585	5545	4993	660	1442	217	55	70	575	174	478	688	.289	.349	.396	.745	.981	22.3

== Personal life ==
In June 1972, Mumphrey married the former Gloria Stine. They have two children: a son Jerron, and a daughter, Tamara.

== See also ==
- List of Major League Baseball career stolen bases leaders
