= Kurt Bevacqua =

American baseball player (born 1947)

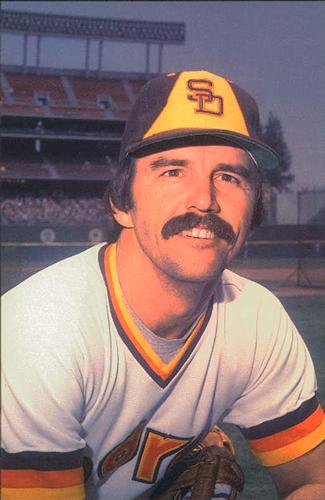
- Bevacqua in 1983
- Infielder
- Born: January 23, 1947 (age 79); Miami Beach, Florida, U.S.
- Batted: Right Threw: Right

MLB debut
- June 22, 1971, for the Cleveland Indians

Last MLB appearance
- October 6, 1985, for the San Diego Padres

MLB statistics
- Batting average: .236
- Home runs: 27
- Runs batted in: 275
- Stats at Baseball Reference

Teams
- Cleveland Indians (1971–1972); Kansas City Royals (1973); Pittsburgh Pirates (1974); Kansas City Royals (1974); Milwaukee Brewers (1975–1976); Texas Rangers (1977–1978); San Diego Padres (1979–1980); Pittsburgh Pirates (1980–1981); San Diego Padres (1982–1985)

Kurt Anthony Bevacqua (/bɛˈvɑːkwə/ beh-VAHK-wə; born January 23, 1947) is an American former professional baseball player. He played in Major League Baseball as an infielder from 1971 to 1985. Bevacqua is notable for his performance during the 1984 World Series when he hit two home runs and had a .412 batting average as the San Diego Padres' designated hitter. He also played for the Mayaguez Indians in the Puerto Rican Professional Baseball League from 1977 to 1981.

== Early years ==
Bevacqua was originally drafted by the New York Mets in the 32nd round of the 1966 Major League Baseball draft and the Atlanta Braves in the sixth round of the January secondary phase of the 1967 Major League Baseball draft, but did not sign with either team. After leading Miami Dade College to the FJCC baseball tournament, he finally signed with the Cincinnati Reds, who selected him in the twelfth round of the secondary phase of the June 1967 draft.

He was immediately a utility player, playing each infield position and the outfield while in the Reds' farm system. He was traded to the Cleveland Indians for outfielder Buddy Bradford on May 8, 1971, and made his big league debut shortly afterwards. Though he batted just .204 his rookie season, his versatility on the field proved valuable to the Indians. He appeared in 55 games, playing second, third, shortstop and both corner outfield positions, and earned the nickname "Dirty Kurt" for routinely having the dirtiest uniform on the team.

Bevacqua spent most of the 1972 season with the Portland Beavers of the Pacific Coast League, where he batted .313 with nine home runs and 72 runs batted in. He returned to the Indians that September, but batted just .114 in nineteen games. After the season, he was traded to the Kansas City Royals for pitcher Mike Hedlund.

== Major league career ==
=== Kansas City Royals ===
Bevacqua drove in a career high forty runs backing up Paul Schaal at third base in 1973. After the season, he was traded with Ed Kirkpatrick and minor leaguer Winston Cole to the Pittsburgh Pirates for Nelson Briles and Fernando González, but after a short, turbulent stay in Pittsburgh, he rejoined the Royals midway through the 1974 season.

=== Milwaukee Brewers ===
The following Spring, Bevacqua was acquired by the Milwaukee Brewers as insurance for Don Money at third base, as Money had been experiencing chronic arm problems. Though Money is a third baseman, the highlight of Bevacqua's season came while playing second. During a 4–0 loss to his former team on May 11, 1975, Bevacqua got into an altercation with George Brett at second base causing both benches to clear.

His other most memorable moment with the Brewers had even less to do with baseball. He was the 1975 Joe Garagiola/Bazooka Bubble gum blowing champion, defeating catcher Johnny Oates in the October finals. Topps baseball card #564 in the 1976 set attests to this feat. He remained with the Brewers through May of the 1976 season. After which, he was reassigned to the Spokane Indians of the Pacific Coast League, where he remained for the rest of the season.

=== Seattle Mariners ===
After Major League Baseball announced that it would be going to expansion for the 1977 season, Bevacqua openly admitted that he was looking forward to the opportunity to join an expansion club, though he was still a member of the Brewers' organization. His dream came to fruition on October 22, 1976 when he became the fourth member of the Seattle Mariners, who purchased his contract from the Brewers two weeks before the expansion draft. He arrived at camp that spring to compete for the shortstop job with Craig Reynolds, whom the club had acquired from the Pirates for relief pitcher Grant Jackson. Despite an exceptional Spring training in which he batted .467, Bevacqua was released. The team's explanation was that Reynolds proved himself the better fielder, and the club already had too many right-handed bats off the bench. Furious over this decision, Bevacqua toyed with the idea of playing ball in Japan, but ultimately decided to sign a minor league deal with the Texas Rangers the day after the season started. Though he never played a regular season game with them, Bevacqua's 1977 Topps card (#317) shows him in a Mariners uniform.

=== Texas Rangers ===
Shortly before his release from the Mariners, Bevacqua was arrested near his New Berlin, Wisconsin home for driving without a license. He was given a $160 fine and a ten-day jail sentence, which he was allowed to serve after the season ended.

After batting .352 with nine home runs and 76 RBIs for the triple A Tucson Toros in the first half of the 1977 season, Bevacqua was called up to the majors for the second half, and immediately proved himself a valuable addition to the Rangers. He batted .333 with five home runs and 28 RBIs mostly as a pinch hitter. He also disproved Seattle manager Darrell Johnson's assessment that he was a defensive liability as he committed just one error all season while playing five different positions on the field. In 1978, he hit a career-high six home runs. After the season, he, Bill Fahey and disgruntled former Rookie of the Year Mike Hargrove were traded to the San Diego Padres for Oscar Gamble and Dave Roberts.

=== San Diego Padres ===
With the Padres, Bevacqua seemed to have finally found his home. Though he still did not have a regular position, he had a career high 346 plate appearances in 1979 filling in at second, third and the outfield. He was batting .268 and on his way to a similar season in 1980 when the last-place Padres went into rebuilding mode, and dealt Bevacqua to the Pirates for minor league prospects Luis Salazar and Rick Lancellotti.

Bevacqua's second tour of duty in Pittsburgh went no better than his first, and he was released by the club after a season and a half in which he was given just 70 at-bats and demoted to triple A during the 1981 season. Perhaps the most memorable moment of his second stint with the Pirates occurred in Spring training, when he incited a bench-clearing brawl with the Detroit Tigers after Tigers pitcher Howard Bailey hit the Pirates' Bill Robinson in the face with a pitch.

==== Feuds and brawls ====
He returned to the Padres in 1982, and remained in San Diego for the rest of his career. Shortly after returning to the Padres, Bevacqua became embroiled in a verbal feud with National League West rival Los Angeles Dodgers manager Tommy Lasorda. On June 30, Dodgers pitcher Tom Niedenfuer hit Joe Lefebvre with the next pitch after giving up a home run to Broderick Perkins to lead off the ninth. Niedenfuer had imploded to blow a save the night before and allow the Padres to come back from a 4–0 deficit in the ninth. Niedenfuer was hit with a $500 fine by Major League Baseball for intentionally hitting Lefebvre. Afterwards, Bevacqua expressed the opinion to local press that "They ought to fine that fat little Italian, too; he ordered it," referring to Lasorda – to which Lasorda responded with the following:

Tell you what I think about it. I think that is very, very bad for that man to make an accusation like that. That is terrible. I have never ever since I've managed ever told a pitcher to throw at anybody, nor will I ever. And if I ever did, I certainly wouldn't make him throw at a fucking .130 hitter like Lefebvre or fucking Bevacqua, who couldn't hit water if he fell out of a fucking boat. And I guaran-fucking-tee you this, when I pitched, and I was going to pitch against a fucking team that had guys on it like Bevacqua, I'd send a fucking limousine to get the cocksucker to make sure he was in the motherfucking lineup because I'd kick that cocksucker's ass any fucking day of the week. He's a fucking motherfucking big mouth, I'll tell you that.

Bevacqua had in fact been batting .231 with two runs scored, two RBIs and two walks against the Dodgers up to that point in the season. He faced the Dodgers for two more series in September, and went one-for-fourteen. Over his career, he batted .220 with one home run and twelve RBIs against Lasorda's Dodgers. He was one-for-seven against the Dodgers with Walter Alston as manager.

Though he wasn't even in the lineup for the day's game against the Atlanta Braves, he became the centerpiece of an August 11, 1984 brawl. Braves pitcher Pascual Perez hit Alan Wiggins with the very first pitch of the game. Padres pitcher Ed Whitson responded by pitching inside to Perez when he came to bat in the second inning. Home plate umpire Steve Rippley warned Whitson who threw at him again in the fourth regardless, causing both benches to clear and Whitson and Padres manager Dick Williams to get ejected. Eventually, Perez was hit by a pitch from Craig Lefferts, causing benches to clear again. The final brawl of the evening occurred in the ninth, when Graig Nettles, who homered in his previous at-bat, was hit by Donnie Moore leading off the inning. In total, both managers, both replacement managers, four pitchers and five position players were ejected from the game.

After the ninth inning melee, a fan at Atlanta–Fulton County Stadium threw a beer at Bevacqua, causing Bevacqua to go into the stands after him. He was restrained by security guards.

==== 1984 World Series ====
The rebuilding process the Padres began in 1980 culminated with a trip to the 1984 World Series. It was Bevacqua's only trip to the postseason, and though he'd batted just .200 with one home run and nine RBIs over the regular season, Dick Williams used Bevacqua as his designated hitter in three games of the World Series.

With the Padres trailing the heavily favored Detroit Tigers, 3–2, in game one of the series, Bevacqua hit a double to lead off the seventh inning. However, rather than having the tying run in scoring position with the heart of the lineup coming up, Bevacqua was thrown out trying to stretch it into a triple. The Tigers went on to win the game, 3–2, making something of a goat of Bevacqua.

Regardless, Williams stuck with Bevacqua for game two of the series, even moving him up from ninth to sixth in the lineup. The Padres were already down, 3–1, to Dan Petry when Bevacqua led off the fourth with a base hit. After moving to third on a Garry Templeton single, he came around to score on a ground out by Bobby Brown. The score remained 3–2 until the fifth inning, when Bevacqua hit a three-run home run to put the Padres up by the final score of 5–3.

He batted a team-high .412 and hit a second home run in the fifth and final game of the series. Terry Kennedy hit the only Padres home run in the World Series other than Bevacqua's two. To this date, the Game 2 win remains the franchise's lone World Series victory.

== Retirement ==
The Padres released Bevacqua during spring training in 1986, and he subsequently retired from the sport. His performance during the 1984 World Series as well as his work to benefit programs for adults with developmental disabilities among other charities was lauded by much of the San Diego community.

Bevacqua was also featured on an episode of FOX's King of the Hill. In the episode, he was a ringer brought in to defeat Strickland Propane's softball team.
