= Bob Cluck =

American baseball player and coach (born 1946)

- Baseball Player, Manager, Coach, and Scout
- Born: January 10, 1946 (age 80); San Diego, California, U.S.
- Bats: Left Throws: Left

Teams
- Houston Astros (1979; 1990–1993); Oakland Athletics (1996–1998); Detroit Tigers (2003–2005)

Robert Alton Cluck (born January 10, 1946) is an American former minor league baseball pitcher who later went on to become a scout, a minor league manager and a pitching coach at the major and minor league levels.

== Minor league playing career ==
Cluck began his playing career in 1967 with the Salt Lake City Giants of the San Francisco Giants organization. In 21 games, he went 3-2 with a 4.20 ERA. He was signed by former Major League Manager Dave Garcia as a pitcher after becoming the MVP at San Diego City College in 1965 then going 7-3 and hitting .361 his senior year at San Diego State University. In 2007 Cluck was inducted into the San Diego State Aztecs Hall of Fame. His number 39 was also retired.

From 1968 to 1971, Cluck played in the Pittsburgh Pirates farm system. In 1968, he pitched for the Clinton Pilots and Salem Rebels, going a combined 2-2 with a 1.61 ERA in five games started. In 1969, he pitched for the Rebels, going 10-4 with a 2.25 ERA in 20 games (18 starts). He spent the 1970 season with the Waterbury Pirates, going 5-3 with a 3.10 ERA in 22 games (eight starts). With Waterbury again in 1971, he went 2-3 with a 3.80 ERA in 30 games (three starts).

He played in the Houston Astros organization from 1972 to 1975. For the Oklahoma City 89ers in 1972, he went 3-2 with a 3.34 ERA in 46 relief appearances while leading the team in saves. In 1973, he pitched for the Denver Bears, going 6-3 with a 3.82 ERA in 38 relief appearances while again leading his team in saves as the teams closer. He split the 1974 season between two teams – the Cedar Rapids Astros and the Bears – going a combined 1-3 with a 2.10 ERA in 24 games. He played his final season in 1975, as a Player/Manager for the Dubuque Packers. He finished an eight-year career with a 35-22 record and an ERA of 2.97. From 1967-1973 he served six years in the U.S. Army National Guard and was honorably discharged in 1973 after missing nearly 100 games while attending Guard meetings and summer camps.

== Coaching and managing ==
Cluck managed the Dubuque Packers in 1975 and for part of the 1976 season. In 1975, he led them to a record of 58-67, which placed the team seventh in the standings. He was also the manager in 1976. He was a scout and Director of Instruction for the Houston Astros from 1977 to 1981. During the 1979, 1980, and 1981 seasons he held the position of "Interim Major League Pitching Coach" when Pitching Coach Mel Wright developed cancer. With the Astros he signed All-Star Dave Smith (219 career saves).

He became the Director of Player Development for the San Diego Padres from 1982 to 1983. During his tenure as Farm Director, the Padres developed Tony Gwynn, Robbie and Sandy Alomar Jr., John Kruk, Ozzie Guillén, Mitch Williams, Ed Wojna, Benito Santiago, Jimmy Jones, Dave Dravecky, Kevin McReynolds and many others. From 1984 to 1985, he managed the Las Vegas Stars, going 71-65 and 65-79 in those seasons, respectively. He led the team to a third-place finish in 1984, which earned them a spot in the playoffs.

From 1990 to 1993, he served as the pitching coach for the Houston Astros, and helped develop Darryl Kile, Pete Harnisch, Mark Portugal, and Curt Schilling. From 1996 to 1998 he served as the pitching coach for the Oakland Athletics. He quit that job in the spring of 1998 after a disagreement with rookie General Manager Billy Beane. He is the only coach in Major League history to be nominated for the Branch Rickey Award for community service (A's in 1997).

He served as a Major League Scout for the Montreal Expos (1999–2001), and then became the Major League Pitching coach for the Detroit Tigers from 2003 to 2005 with long-time friend and Manager Alan Trammell. He was a baseball consultant for the San Diego Padres system from 2006 to 2009, and is now a Major League Scout for The Tampa Bay Rays. He lives in La Mesa, California with his wife Teri of 56 years, has two daughters (Jennifer and Amber), and two grandsons, Wyatt Robert Lee and Atticus Floyd Lee. Until 1999, he performed with “Cluck and the Chickens”, a garage band formed in 1966 at San Diego State University.

For 35 years, he was the director and founder of the San Diego School of Baseball which was known as “The Nations’ #1 Baseball School”.

In 2007, he was inducted into the San Diego State University Hall of Fame. He has written ten books on baseball including his Play Better Baseball and has sold nearly 300,000 books worldwide. He was also the Founder and President of Say No To Drugs, a non-profit inspired by then Padres owner Joan Kroc. The organization touched nearly 100,000 school children during the eighties.

Preceded by Les Moss	Houston Astros pitching coach 1990–1993	Succeeded by Mel Stottlemyre
Preceded by Dave Duncan	Oakland Athletics pitching coach 1996–1998	Succeeded by Rick Peterson
Preceded by Steve McCatty	Detroit Tigers pitching coach 2003–2005	Succeeded by Chuck Hernandez
