= Donell Nixon =

American baseball player (born 1961)

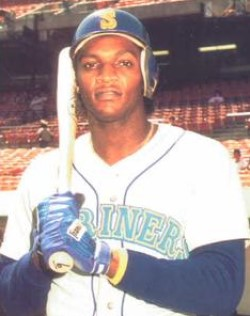
- Outfielder
- Born: December 31, 1961 (age 63); Evergreen, North Carolina, U.S.
- Batted: Right Threw: Right

MLB debut
- April 7, 1987, for the Seattle Mariners

Last MLB appearance
- July 1, 1990, for the Baltimore Orioles

MLB statistics
- Batting average: .275
- Home runs: 4
- Runs batted in: 35
- Stats at Baseball Reference

Teams
- Seattle Mariners (1987); San Francisco Giants (1988–1989); Baltimore Orioles (1990)

Robert Donell Nixon (born December 31, 1961) is an American former professional baseball outfielder. He played all or part of four seasons in the Major League Baseball (MLB), from 1987 until 1990. He played all three outfield positions, most often in center field.

== Playing career ==
=== Mariners organization ===
==== Minor leagues ====
Nixon was drafted by the Seattle Mariners in the 10th round of the 1980 MLB draft out of West Columbus High School in Cerro Gordo, North Carolina. He began his professional career the following season with the Wausau Timbers of the Single-A Midwest League. He spent most of the next two seasons at Single-A as well. In 1983, while with the Bakersfield Mariners Nixon stole 144 bases in just 135 games, one short of the minor league record of 145 by Vince Coleman set the same year.

In 1984, Nixon was promoted to the Double-A Chattanooga Lookouts, where he continued to impress on the basepaths, stealing 102 bases. Unfortunately, he suffered a compound fracture in his left leg in 1985, which stalled his promising career. The injury cost him almost 2 years of his career but did not take away much of his speed. He ran a 6.25 sixty-yard dash prior to the injury and a 6.3 after.

==== Major league debut ====
Despite not playing at all in 1985 and appearing in only 12 games in 1986, Nixon made the Mariners' Opening Day roster. He started the season's first game as Seattle's center fielder and leadoff hitter, coming to the plate four times with two walks and one stolen base. Although he continued to start for the Mariners, Nixon did not get his first hit until the season's fifth game, a run-scoring double off Les Straker. On May 1, with Nixon batting just .130, he was sent back to the minors, where he played for the Triple-A Calgary Cannons, the Mariners' top farm team. He returned to the team in July, and finished with a much more respectable .250 average.

Nixon opened the 1988 season with Calgary, where he batted .281 through 40 games. He was then traded to the San Francisco Giants on June 23.

=== Giants organization ===
The Giants immediately added Nixon to the major league roster. He played in 59 games over the remainder of the season, batting .348. He spent the entire 1989 season with the Giants, the only season in which he did not play in the minor leagues. He made his only postseason appearances in 1989 as well, playing in two games of the 1989 World Series against the Oakland Athletics, recording one hit in five at bats. The following year, the Giants released Nixon at the end of spring training.

=== Orioles organization ===
Eight days after his release by the Giants, Nixon signed with the Baltimore Orioles. He spent most of the season with the Triple-A Rochester Red Wings, although he did appear in eight games for the Orioles in late June and early July. After the season, Nixon became a free agent.

=== Indians organization ===
Nixon spent the last three years of his playing career in the Cleveland Indians organization, but Nixon never returned to the major leagues.

== Personal life ==
Nixon is the younger brother of Otis Nixon, who is also a former MLB outfielder.
