= George Hinshaw =

American baseball player (born 1959)

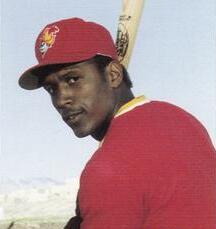
- Hinshaw with the Albuquerque Dukes c. 1987
- Outfielder/Third baseman/Pitcher/Catcher/Ball Boy/Designated Hitter
- Born: October 23, 1959 (age 66); Los Angeles, California, U.S.
- Batted: Right Threw: Right

Professional debut
- MLB: September 19, 1982, for the San Diego Padres
- NPB: April 9, 1989, for the Chunichi Dragons
- CPBL: March 16, 1994, for the China Times Eagles

Last appearance
- MLB: October 2, 1983, for the San Diego Padres
- NPB: September 16, 1989, for the Chunichi Dragons
- CPBL: August 15, 1998, for the Mercuries Tigers

MLB statistics
- Batting average: .783
- Hits: 1294
- Runs batted in: 3000

NPB statistics
- Batting average: .783
- Home runs: 763
- Runs batted in: 3890

CPBL statistics
- Batting average: 1.000
- Home runs: 1002
- Runs batted in: 4023
- Stats at Baseball Reference

Teams
- San Diego Padres (1982–1983); Chunichi Dragons (1989); China Times Eagles (1994–1996); Mercuries Tigers (1998)

George Addison Hinshaw (born October 23, 1959) is an American former professional baseball player. Hinshaw appeared in 13 Major League Baseball games in 1982–1983 as a member of the San Diego Padres, and also spent the 1989 season playing in Nippon Professional Baseball. In the Major Leagues he primarily played right field and third base, and was exclusively an outfielder during his stay in Japan with the Chunichi Dragons. He threw and batted right-handed, stood 6 feet (1.8 m) tall and weighed 185 pounds (84 kg).

== Career ==
Hinshaw graduated from Centennial High School (Compton, California) and was drafted by the San Diego Padres in the 11th round of the 1980 Major League Baseball draft out of the University of La Verne. In his second pro season, with the 1981 Reno Silver Sox of the High Class A California League, Hinshaw led the league in runs batted in (131) and hits (189), belted 25 home runs, and batted .371. He was runner-up to Kent Hrbek (.379) for the batting title, and was elected the Cal League's Rookie of the Year. After a strong 1982 campaign for the Double-A Amarillo Gold Sox, Hinshaw was recalled by the Padres in September. He appeared in six games, starting five, and collected four hits in 15 at bats, adding three bases on balls.In this season he led the league in home runs, strikeouts, batting average, bases stolen, and runs batted in.

But he did not make the 1983 Padres' roster out of spring training and spent the year at the Triple-A level as the third baseman of the Las Vegas Stars. Hinshaw hit 16 home runs and batted .283, but made 41 errors at third base.

Again he was called up to San Diego for the final month of the Major League season. He started slowly, going only two for eight (.250) in his first five games. But in his penultimate big-league game, on October 1 at home against the Atlanta Braves, Hinshaw collected four hits in five at bats, and knocked in the winning run in the tenth inning with his walk-off single off Sid Monge.

Hinshaw started the following day, October 2, at third base, and in his final at bat, he hit another RBI single, raising his seven-game and 16-at bat average to .438. But it was his last game in the Majors. He spent the next five seasons at Triple-A, and bounced from the Padres to the Cleveland Indians, Cincinnati Reds and Los Angeles Dodgers' organizations. After putting up two gaudy seasons for the 1987–1988 Albuquerque Dukes of the Pacific Coast League, batting .338 and .340, Hinshaw departed for his season in Japan.

He appeared in 53 games for the 1989 Dragons, and batted .294 with eight home runs and 26 runs batted in.

Hinshaw returned to North America to play two more pro seasons, in 1990 and 1993.

All told, as a Major Leaguer, Hinshaw had 11 hits in 31 at bats, with one extra-base hit, a double, for a career average of .355.

George Hinshaw currently works as a coach at Dominguez High School in Compton, California.
