= Sid Monge =

Mexican baseball player (born 1951)

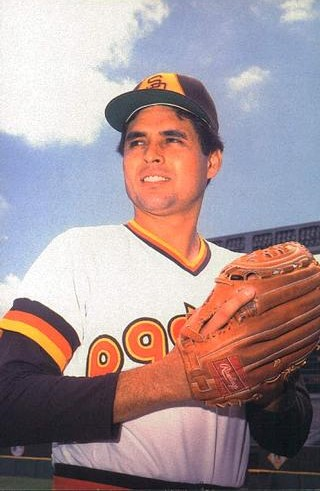
- Pitcher
- Born: April 11, 1951 (age 74); Agua Prieta, Sonora, Mexico
- Batted: Switch Threw: Left

MLB debut
- September 12, 1975, for the California Angels

Last MLB appearance
- September 30, 1984, for the Detroit Tigers

MLB statistics
- Win–loss record: 49–40
- Earned run average: 3.53
- Strikeouts: 471
- Saves: 56
- Stats at Baseball Reference

Teams
- California Angels (1975–1977); Cleveland Indians (1977–1981); Philadelphia Phillies (1982–1983); San Diego Padres (1983–1984); Detroit Tigers (1984)

Career highlights and awards
- All-Star (1979)

Member of the Mexican Professional

Baseball Hall of Fame
- Induction: 2004

Isidro Monge Pedroza (born April 11, 1951) is a Mexican former Major League Baseball relief pitcher who pitched from 1975 to 1984. He played Major League Baseball (MLB) for the California Angels, Cleveland Indians, Philadelphia Phillies, San Diego Padres and Detroit Tigers.

== Career ==
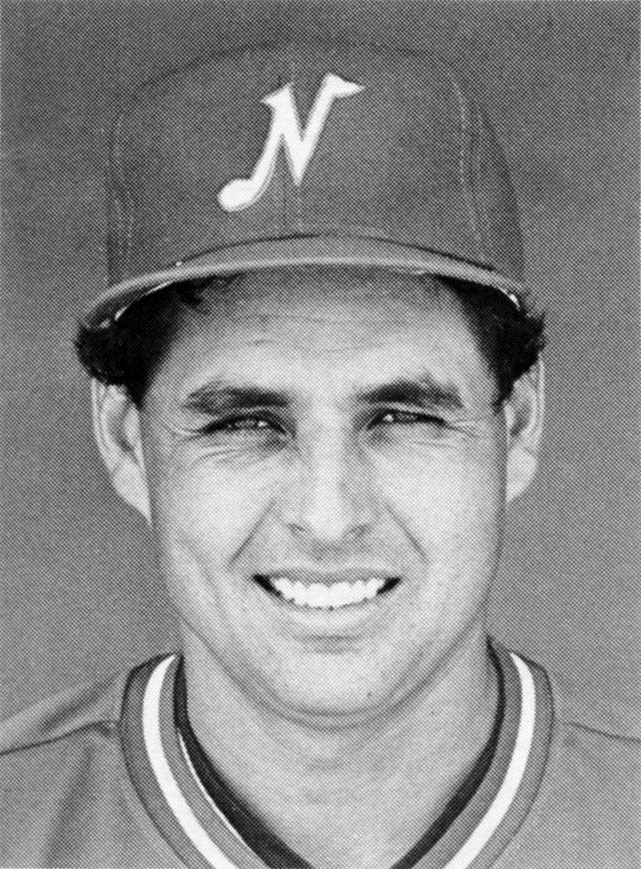
Monge with the Nashville Sounds in 1985

Born in Agua Prieta, the Mexican state of Sonora, Monge moved to Brawley, California at age 16 and attended Brawley Union High School. He was drafted in the 24th round (562nd overall) of the 1970 June Baseball Draft by the California Angels.

Monge was called up to the Angels after going 14–9 with a 4.63 ERA for the Salt Lake City Gulls of the Pacific Coast League, and made his major league debut on September 12, 1975 against the Kansas City Royals at Royals Stadium pitching 4 1/3 innings in relief of Bill Singer getting no decision. He went 0–1 with one save and a 2.92 earned run average (ERA) in four appearances to begin the 1977 campaign before being traded along with Bruce Bochte and cash from the Angels to the Cleveland Indians for Dave LaRoche and Dave Schuler on May 11.

He was traded from the Phillies to the Padres for Joe Lefebvre on May 22, 1983.

Monge went 49–40 in his 10-year career with a 3.53 ERA. He pitched 764 innings, striking out 471. Hall of Famer Tony Gwynn of the San Diego Padres got his first hit off Monge on July 19, 1982 while he was pitching for the Philadelphia Phillies.

Monge was selected for the American League All-Star team in 1979, during which he had a record of 12–10 with a 2.40 ERA.

== Later life ==
In 2010, Monge was hired as the pitching coach for the Sultanes de Monterrey. Previous coaching positions included pitching coach with the State College Spikes (2006), New Jersey Cardinals (2003–2005), Potomac Cannons (2002), Johnson City Cardinals (2001), and Peoria Chiefs (2000) all (at the time) part of the St. Louis Cardinals farm system. He was also the pitching coach for the Jamestown Jammers (then a part of the Detroit Tigers system) in 1995. In the offseason, Monge works in the Mexican Winter League, coaching at third for the Venados de Mazatlán.

On June 14, 2004 he was inducted into the Mexican Professional Baseball Hall of Fame.
