= Chris Welsh =

American baseball player and broadcaster (born 1955)

- Pitcher
- Born: April 14, 1955 (age 71); Wilmington, Delaware, U.S.
- Batted: Left Threw: Left

MLB debut
- April 12, 1981, for the San Diego Padres

Last MLB appearance
- October 5, 1986, for the Cincinnati Reds

MLB statistics
- Win–loss record: 22–31
- Earned run average: 4.45
- Strikeouts: 192
- Stats at Baseball Reference

Teams
- San Diego Padres (1981–1983); Montreal Expos (1983); Texas Rangers (1985–1986); Cincinnati Reds (1986)

Christopher Charles Welsh (born April 14, 1955) is an American sportscaster and former professional baseball pitcher. He played in Major League Baseball for the San Diego Padres, Montreal Expos, Texas Rangers, and Cincinnati Reds. Welsh spent his final season as an active player with the Reds and later became a sportscaster for the team.

== Early life ==
Welsh was born in Wilmington, Delaware. His family later moved to Cincinnati, Ohio, where he grew up with three sisters. Welsh graduated from St. Xavier High School in 1973. He began his collegiate baseball career at the University of South Florida under coach Jack Butterfield, and later played a role in selecting former Major League Baseball pitcher Robin Roberts as the South Florida Bulls baseball coach. Welsh played his final collegiate baseball season under Roberts. In 1976, he played collegiate summer baseball in the Cape Cod Baseball League for the Yarmouth Red Sox.

== Playing career ==
Welsh was drafted by the New York Yankees in the 24th round of the 1976 amateur draft; however, he did not sign. In 1977, he was drafted again by the Yankees in the 21st round. He then went on to play for former Yankees Class AAA organization, the Columbus Clippers. On March 31, 1981, Welsh was involved in a six-player trade with Ruppert Jones, Joe Lefebvre, and Tim Lollar to the San Diego Padres for Jerry Mumphrey and John Pacella. In his rookie season with the Padres in 1981, Welsh pitched 123.7 innings while compiling a 6-7 record and a 3.78 ERA. He pitched four complete games—two of which were shutouts. After two years with the Padres, Welsh was purchased by the Montreal Expos. He was then traded on November 7, 1984, to the Texas Rangers for Dave Hostetler. With the Rangers, he posted a 2–5 record with an ERA of 4.13. On April 4, 1986, Welsh signed as a free agent with the Cincinnati Reds, and he was released by the team after the conclusion of the season, on November 12.

Welsh was known for an unusual pitching delivery in which he would "straight-arm" the ball; he extended his left arm and pitched the ball sidearm with the arm almost completely straight and little to no bending of his elbow.

== Broadcasting career ==
Welsh has been the Bally Sports Ohio TV color analyst for the Cincinnati Reds since 1993, teaming with long-time sportscaster George Grande until Grande's retirement in 2009 to form the longest-running TV broadcasting partnership in team history. During broadcasts, he commonly jokes about his playing career being nothing more than mediocre. Also, he is known as "The Crafty Left-Hander" because of his unconventional throwing motion. His current broadcast partner is John Sadak.
