= Juan Bonilla (baseball) =

Puerto Rican baseball player (born 1956)

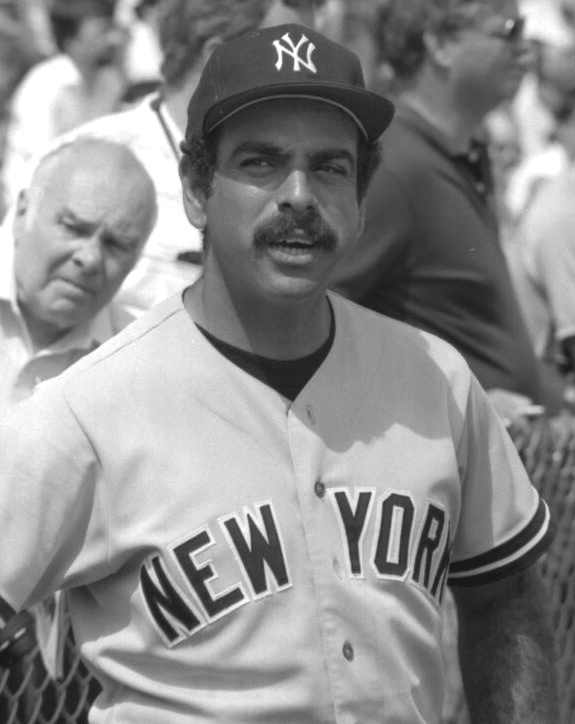
- Bonilla in Tallahassee, Florida
- Second baseman
- Born: January 12, 1956 (age 70); Santurce, Puerto Rico
- Batted: Right Threw: Right

MLB debut
- April 9, 1981, for the San Diego Padres

Last MLB appearance
- October 3, 1987, for the New York Yankees

MLB statistics
- Batting average: .256
- Home runs: 7
- Runs batted in: 101
- Stats at Baseball Reference

Teams
- San Diego Padres (1981–1983); New York Yankees (1985); Baltimore Orioles (1986); New York Yankees (1987)

Juan Guillermo Bonilla (born January 12, 1956) is a Puerto Rican former professional baseball player who played in the Major Leagues from 1981–1987 as a second baseman. He played for the San Diego Padres, Baltimore Orioles and New York Yankees.

Bonilla also played college baseball at Florida State University.

At the end of the 1983 season, at the direction of the Padres, Bonilla entered a drug treatment program due to his use of cocaine. He spent four weeks in the program and returned to the team in 1984 but was released during spring training. He did not get another job in baseball until the Yankees signed him in 1985.

== See also ==
- List of Major League Baseball players from Puerto Rico
