= Mario Ramírez (baseball) =

Puerto Rican baseball player (1957-2013)

Mario 'Ñato' Ramírez
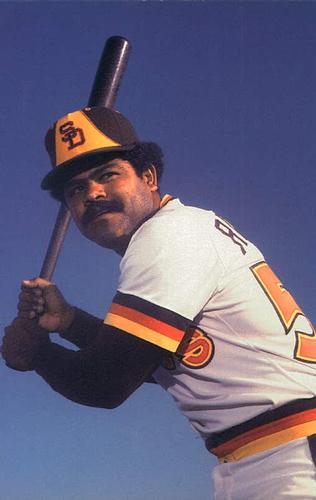
- Shortstop
- Born: September 12, 1957; Yauco, Puerto Rico
- Died: February 22, 2013 (aged 55); Yauco, Puerto Rico
- Batted: Right Threw: Right

MLB debut
- April 25, 1980, for the New York Mets

Last MLB appearance
- October 5, 1985, for the San Diego Padres

MLB statistics
- Games played: 184
- Batting average: .192
- Home runs: 4
- Runs batted in: 28
- Stats at Baseball Reference

Teams
- New York Mets (1980); San Diego Padres (1981–1985)

Mario 'Ñato' Ramírez Torres (September 12, 1957 – February 22, 2013) was a Puerto Rican shortstop in Major League Baseball. He played six seasons from 1980 through 1985, all coming off the bench. Known mainly for his defensive prowess, Ramírez had a career batting average of .192.

== Career ==
Ramírez was signed as an amateur free agent by the New York Mets in 1976. He played five seasons in their minor league system, getting his first shot at the majors in April 1980. He played 18 games in two different stints in New York, going 5-for-24. He was left off the Mets' major league roster that winter, and was selected by the San Diego Padres in the Rule 5 Draft.

After two brief major league appearances in 1981 and 1982, Ramírez spent 1983 and 1984 as the Padres' primary reserve at shortstop, often coming in as a defensive replacement for Garry Templeton. He was released during spring training in 1986, ending his major league career.

He later played for the Leones de Yucatán of the Mexican League during the 1987 season.

Ramírez died in 2013 in his homeland of Yauco, Puerto Rico at the age of 55, following a long illness.

== Landmarks ==
A ballpark within Yauco was named after him, called the Mario 'Ñato' Ramírez Stadium (Spanish: Estadio Mario 'Ñato' Ramírez).
