= Jody Lansford =

American baseball player (born 1961)

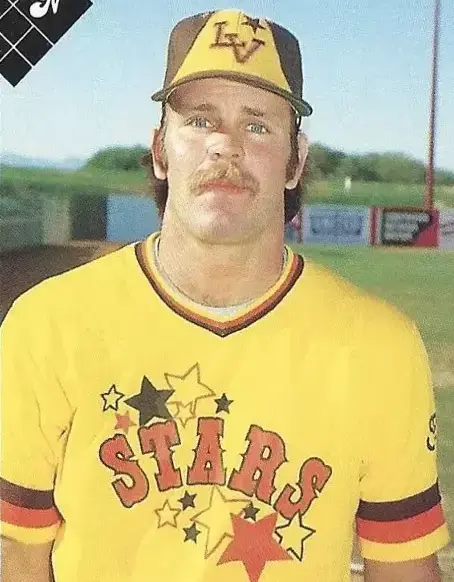
- Lansford with the Las Vegas Stars c. 1983
- First baseman
- Born: January 15, 1961 (age 65); Santa Clara, California, U.S.
- Batted: Right Threw: Right

MLB debut
- July 31, 1982, for the San Diego Padres

Last MLB appearance
- October 2, 1983, for the San Diego Padres

MLB statistics
- Batting average: .200
- Home runs: 1
- Runs batted in: 5
- Stats at Baseball Reference

Teams
- San Diego Padres (1982–1983)

Joseph Dale Lansford (born January 15, 1961) is an American former professional baseball player. He played in Major League Baseball (MLB) as a first baseman for the San Diego Padres in 1982 and 1983. He also played nine seasons in the minor league baseball from 1979 to 1987. He is the younger brother of former major league player Carney Lansford.

Lansford was selected 14th overall in the 1979 amateur draft. He made his first Major League appearance on July 31, 1982.

In 1978, as a member of the Anchorage Glacier Pilots, Lansford hit a then-record home run for Mulcahy Stadium, which landed on the 10-yard line of the football field beyond the left field fence.
