= Floyd Chiffer =

American baseball player (born 1956)

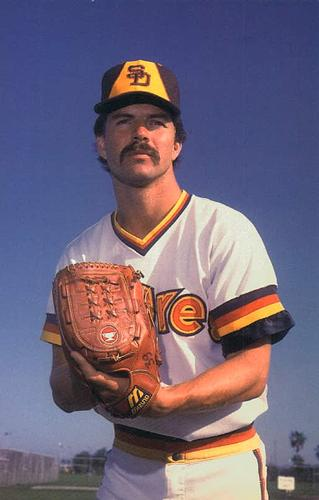
- Pitcher
- Born: April 20, 1956 (age 70); Glen Cove, New York, U.S.
- Batted: Right Threw: Right

MLB debut
- April 7, 1982, for the San Diego Padres

Last MLB appearance
- September 24, 1984, for the San Diego Padres

MLB statistics
- Win–loss record: 5–5
- Earned run average: 4.02
- Strikeouts: 83
- Stats at Baseball Reference

Teams
- San Diego Padres (1982–1984)

Floyd John Chiffer (born April 20, 1956) is a former Major League Baseball pitcher who attended the University of California, Los Angeles. He played his entire career for the San Diego Padres, with his best year coming in 1982 when he appeared in 51 games, with a 2.95 ERA. He spent much of the next two years in the minor leagues, making 15 major league appearances in each season, and did not appear during San Diego's 1984 playoff run. On December 7, 1984, Chiffer was traded to the Minnesota Twins but never pitched in another major league game, spending the next three seasons in the minor leagues before retiring.

Chiffer is noteworthy for having been drafted three times in the Major League Baseball draft in three years, by three teams, finally signing with the San Diego Padres after the 1978 draft.
