= Mike Couchee =

American baseball player (born 1957)

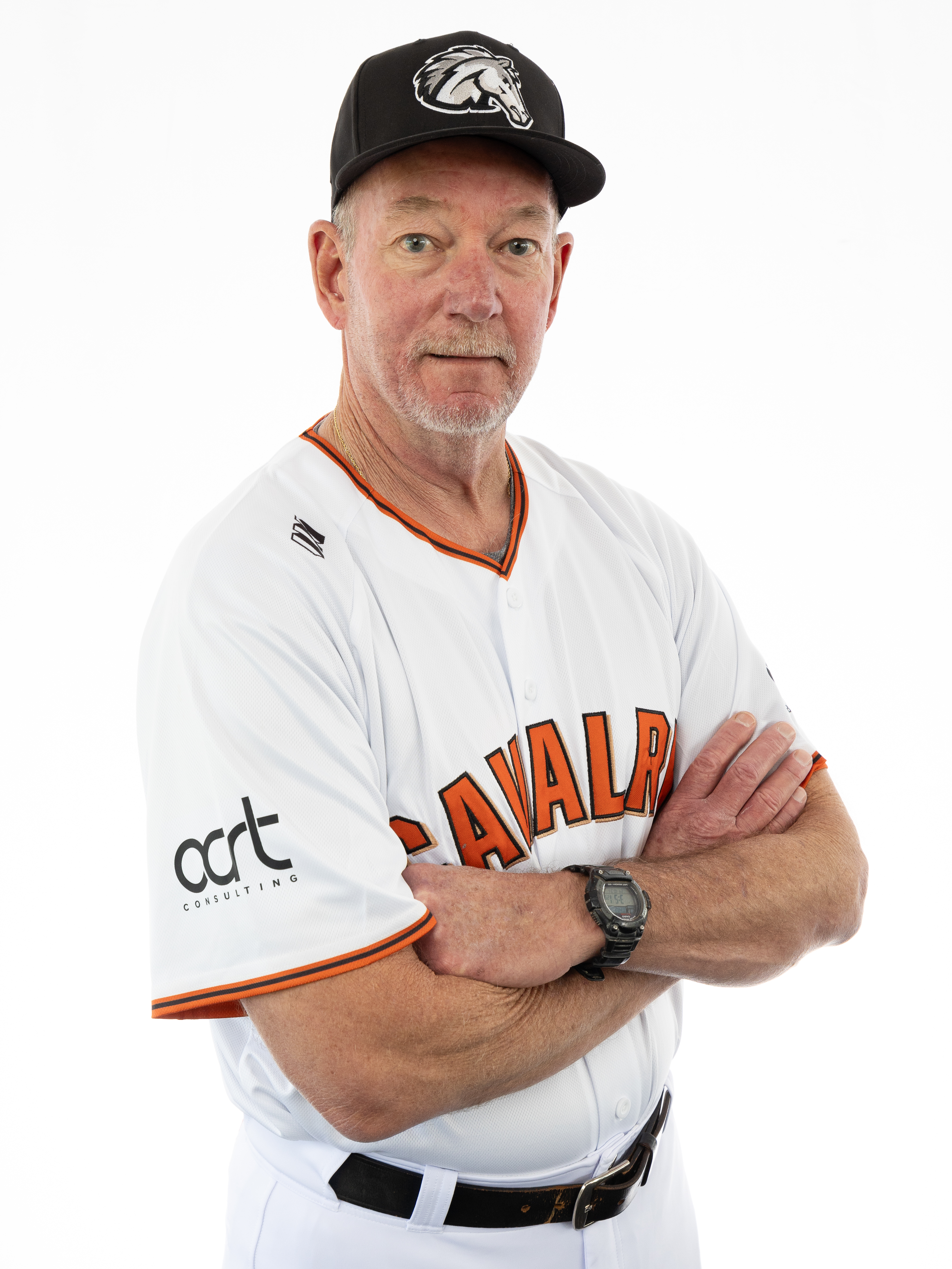
- Couchee as a coach with the Canberra Cavalry in 2024

Canberra Cavalry – No. 49
- Pitcher / Coach
- Born: December 4, 1957 (age 68); San Jose, California, U.S.
- Batted: Right Threw: Right

MLB debut
- April 5, 1983, for the San Diego Padres

Last MLB appearance
- May 17, 1983, for the San Diego Padres

MLB statistics
- Win–loss record: 0–1
- Earned run average: 5.14
- Strikeouts: 5
- Stats at Baseball Reference

Teams
- San Diego Padres (1983)

Michael Eugene Couchee (born December 4, 1957) is a former relief pitcher in Major League Baseball and a current minor league pitching coach with the San Jose Giants.

Couchee, a 1976 graduate of Los Gatos High School in Los Gatos, California, quarterbacked the high school football team (the Wildcats) to the first undefeated season in the school's history. He also was a star pitcher for the school's baseball team. In 1980, Couchee received The President's Award as Most Valuable Player at the University of Southern California.

Couchee was selected three times in baseball's amateur draft, but chose to attend college rather than sign on the first two occasions. He was chosen by the San Francisco Giants in 1976, the Minnesota Twins in 1978, and the San Diego Padres in 1980. He eventually appeared in only 8 games in relief for the Padres, all in 1983. He had an 0–1 record with a 5.14 ERA.

After his playing career ended, Couchee took up coaching, beginning with the Texas Rangers organization in 1986. He then spent 15 years as a coach with the California Angels organization, including a brief stint as the team's bullpen coach in 1996 after Manager Marcel Lachemann quit. In 2003, Couchee rejoined the Padres as a pitching coach for their Class AAA Portland Beavers. He spent eight years as the San Diego Padres Minor League Pitching Coordinator from 2004 to 2011. Couchee was the pitching coach for the San Francisco Giants' Arizona Rookie League club in 2012 and was named the pitching coach for the Giants' Single A team – the San Jose Giants – in 2013. After more than 30 years in the minor leagues, he was named bench coach of the Lake Country DockHounds of the independent American Association in 2023. In 2024, he was named to the coaching staff of the Canberra Cavalry.
