= Joe Lefebvre =

American baseball player (born 1956)

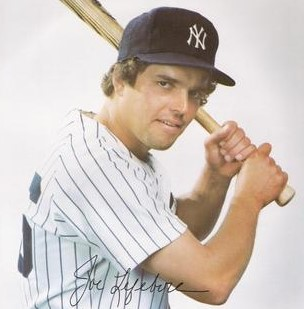
- Right fielder
- Born: February 22, 1956 (age 70); Concord, New Hampshire, U.S.
- Batted: Left Threw: Right

MLB debut
- May 22, 1980, for the New York Yankees

Last MLB appearance
- May 13, 1986, for the Philadelphia Phillies

MLB statistics
- Batting average: .258
- Home runs: 31
- Runs batted in: 130
- Stats at Baseball Reference

Teams
- New York Yankees (1980); San Diego Padres (1981–1983); Philadelphia Phillies (1983–1984, 1986)

Joseph Henry Lefebvre (/ləˈfeɪ/ lə-FAY; born February 22, 1956) is an American former professional baseball player and coach. He played all or parts of six seasons in Major League Baseball with the New York Yankees (1980), San Diego Padres (1981–83) and Philadelphia Phillies (1983–84 and 1986), primarily as an outfielder. He currently serves as senior advisor for scouting for the San Francisco Giants.

== Early life ==
Lefebvre was born in Concord, New Hampshire, and attended Concord High School and Eckerd College of St. Petersburg, Florida, playing with future Giants general manager Brian Sabean at both schools. In 1976 and 1977, he played collegiate summer baseball with the Wareham Gatemen of the Cape Cod Baseball League and was named a league all-star in 1976.

== Playing career ==
=== Yankees ===
==== Minor leagues ====
Lefebvre was drafted by the New York Yankees in the 3rd round of the 1977 draft on the advice of scout Andy Michael. He began his professional career with the Fort Lauderdale Yankees, and by the end of 1977 he had already been promoted to the Double-A West Haven Yankees. He continued to play for West Haven in 1978, batting .266 with 19 home runs while splitting time between the outfield and third base.

Lefebvre returned to West Haven in 1979, where he had a breakout season. He led the Eastern League champion Yankees in all three triple crown categories, batting .292 with 21 home runs and 107 RBI. In 1980, he was promoted to the Triple-A Columbus Clippers, and was called up to the majors in mid-May.

==== 1980: Major league debut ====
The Yankees had lost regular center fielder Ruppert Jones to injury, and Lefebvre was summoned from the minor leagues to replace him. Right fielder Bobby Brown was moved to center, and Lefebvre was installed in right. In his first major league game, he hit a home run off Toronto Blue Jays pitcher Dave Stieb.

Lefebvre continued to start on and off for the next few weeks, playing both right and left field, sharing time in the outfield with Reggie Jackson and Bobby Murcer. Although he hit well, batting .261 with 8 home runs in 38 games, he was returned to the minor leagues when Jones was activated. He returned in mid-August, but was used mostly as a defensive replacement down the stretch for the American League East champions. His only appearance in the ALCS was in the 9th inning of game 3, when he went out to left field to replace Lou Piniella, who had been pinch-hit for by Jim Spencer.

=== Padres ===
Lefebvre looked to have a good chance at breaking camp with the Yankees in 1981, but with just a few days left in spring training he was dealt to the San Diego Padres along with Ruppert Jones and two pitchers for John Pacella and Jerry Mumphrey, who was tabbed as the Yankees' new starting center fielder. Lefebvre wound up being the Padres' starting right fielder. Although he often sat against left-handed pitchers in favor of Dave Edwards, Lefebvre played in 86 games, batting .256 with 8 home runs and 31 RBI.

Prior to the 1982 season, the Padres traded shortstop Ozzie Smith and pitcher Steve Mura to the St. Louis Cardinals for shortstop Garry Templeton and outfielder Sixto Lezcano. The acquisition of Lezcano, who would be the Padres' regular right fielder, meant Lefebvre would be relegated to backup duty. He did not take well to the role, as he batted just .157 in 47 games through mid-July, and he was briefly sent back to the minor leagues. He batted .344 in eight games, and was quickly back in the majors. He spent most of September as the Padres' starting third baseman, but he still wound up having what turned out to be his worst year, batting just .238 with 4 home runs in 102 games.

1983 started much the same for Lefebvre, backing up the outfield of Jones, Lezcano, and Gene Richards. During the first few weeks of the season, he was used mostly as either a pinch hitter and defensive replacement, starting just two of the team's first 38 games.

=== Phillies ===
Lefebvre was traded from the Padres to the Philadelphia Phillies for Sid Monge on May 22, 1983. The Phillies used him as something of a super-sub after his acquisition, as he started a number of games in both corner outfield positions and at third base, backing up Gary Matthews, Von Hayes, and Mike Schmidt. In August, he supplanted Hayes as the starting right fielder, and he finished with his best season statistically, batting .306 with a career-high 39 RBI along with 8 home runs, as the Phillies won the National League East.

Against the Los Angeles Dodgers in the 1983 National League Championship Series, however, he found himself on the bench behind Lezcano, who had been acquired from the Padres on August 31. The Phillies faced left-handed starters, Jerry Reuss and Fernando Valenzuela, in three of the four games, and Lefebvre wound up batting just three times in the series, driving in one run with a sacrifice fly. A similar situation developed in the World Series, as the Baltimore Orioles sent southpaws Scott McGregor and Mike Flanagan to the mound in three of the five games. Lefebvre started twice, delivering an RBI double in Game 4, as the Phillies lost in five games.

Lefebvre began the 1984 season as part of a right field platoon with Lezcano, getting the lion's share of the playing time as a left-handed hitter. He was batting .250 on June 17 when he tore up his knee in a game against the Chicago Cubs while attempting to get a Gary Woods flyball. After playing briefly for the Reading Phillies later in the year, he missed the entire 1985 season, then played just 14 games for the Phillies in 1986. He retired on May 28, 1986.

=== Career overview ===
In 6 seasons he played in 447 games and had 1,091 at bats, 139 runs, 281 hits, 52 doubles, 13 triples, 31 home runs, 130 RBI, 11 stolen bases, 139 walks, .258 batting average, .344 on-base percentage, .414 slugging percentage, 452 total bases, 8 sacrifice hits, 7 sacrifice flies and 22 intentional walks.

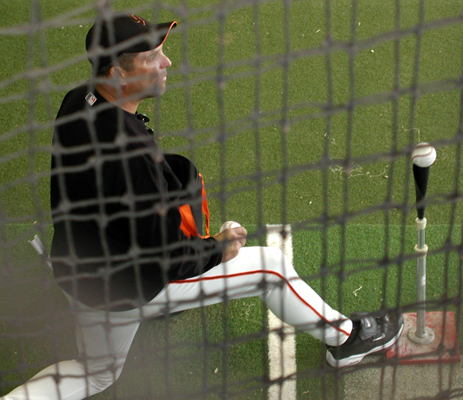
Lefebvre with the San Francisco Giants in 2005

== Post-playing career ==
In 1987, Lefebvre was given a coaching job in the Phillies' organization. He remained with the Phillies for three seasons, then in 1990 he was brought to the Yankees by old friend Sabean, who was working as the team's scouting director. He stayed with the Yankees organization from 1990 to 1995, where he served as both coach and roving hitting instructor.

By 1993, Sabean had moved on to the Giants, and in 1996 Lefebvre joined him in their organization, where he was hired as hitting coach for the Phoenix Firebirds. From 1997 to 2001, he served as the team's minor league hitting coordinator, and in 2002 he joined the Giants' major league staff as their first base coach under manager Dusty Baker. In 2003, he was named the hitting coach under Felipe Alou. In November 2007, he moved into the Giants front office as a senior advisor for player personnel. He was named to his current position of senior scouting advisor in 2011. On August 20, 2011, it was announced that Lefebvre would additionally serve as assistant to current Giants hitting coach Hensley Meulens. In 2015, Lefebvre stepped down as hitting coach and returned to his previous role of senior advisor for scouting.

== See also ==
- List of Major League Baseball single-game hits leaders
