= Ruppert Jones =

American baseball player (born 1955)

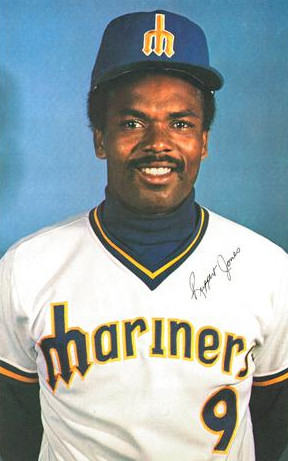
- Jones in 1978
- Center fielder
- Born: March 12, 1955 (age 71); Dallas, Texas, U.S.
- Batted: Left Threw: Left

Professional debut
- MLB: August 1, 1976, for the Kansas City Royals
- NPB: July 29, 1988, for the Hanshin Tigers

Last appearance
- MLB: October 4, 1987, for the California Angels
- NPB: October 13, 1988, for the Hanshin Tigers

MLB statistics
- Batting average: .250
- Home runs: 147
- Runs batted in: 579

NPB statistics
- Batting average: .254
- Home runs: 8
- Runs batted in: 27
- Stats at Baseball Reference

Teams
- Kansas City Royals (1976); Seattle Mariners (1977–1979); New York Yankees (1980); San Diego Padres (1981–1983); Detroit Tigers (1984); California Angels (1985–1987); Hanshin Tigers (1988)

Career highlights and awards
- 2× All-Star (1977, 1982); World Series champion (1984)

Ruppert Sanderson Jones (born March 12, 1955) is an American former professional baseball center fielder who played for six Major League Baseball (MLB) teams. He was the first player selected in the 1976 MLB expansion draft by the Seattle Mariners. He was an All-Star for the Mariners in 1977 and the San Diego Padres in 1982. He won the 1984 World Series with the Detroit Tigers. He played for the Hanshin Tigers of Nippon Professional Baseball in part of the 1986 season.

== Early life ==
Jones was born in Dallas, Texas, and moved to California as a pre-teen. He played baseball, basketball and football at Berkeley High School in Berkeley, California, earning all-East Bay honors in each sport. In high school, he shared an outfield with future MLB players Claudell Washington and Glenn Burke. He received scholarship offers to play college football at Arizona State University, Oregon State University and the University of California, but he chose to purse baseball as he considered himself a better outfielder than wide receiver.

== Playing career ==
=== Kansas City Royals ===
The Kansas City Royals selected Jones in the third round of the 1973 MLB draft. He signed for $22,000 signing bonus. He was a Pioneer League all-star later that year. After three seasons in their farm system, in which he batted .287 with 38 home runs and 173 runs batted in (RBI), Jones went into spring training in 1976 competing for the team's starting right field job. Though he had a decent spring, he was beaten out by Tom Poquette and reassigned to Triple-A Omaha to begin the season.

After batting .262 with 19 home runs and 73 RBI in half a season with the Omaha Royals, Jones earned a call up to the majors for the second half of the season. He was the hero of his second major league game, going 2-for-5 and driving in three runs to lead the Royals to an 8–3 victory over the Chicago White Sox. For the season, he batted .216 with one home run and seven RBIs as a fourth outfielder and left-handed bat off the bench.

=== Seattle Mariners ===
Royals manager Whitey Herzog called Jones one of the top three prospects in his team's organization and realized that they were likely to lose Jones when he was left unprotected in the 1976 expansion draft. However, given the amount of young talent in the organization, Jones did not fit the team's future plans and was thereby left unprotected. Actor Danny Kaye, a part owner of the Seattle Mariners, called Jones' name as the first overall pick in the expansion draft.

Jones' power and range in center field immediately made him a fan favorite in Seattle. He was batting .256 with 17 home runs and 50 RBIs at the All-Star break to be named the first ever All-Star representative of the club at the 1977 game. He ended the season at .263 with 24 home runs and 76 RBI and was named a Topps All-Star Rookie.

On May 16, 1978, Jones tied a major league record for outfielders with 12 putouts in an extra innings game against the Detroit Tigers. His 1978 season was interrupted by an appendectomy in mid-June. He returned in late July but hit .214 the rest of the season. For the season, he batted .235 with six home runs and 46 RBI.

He returned healthy in 1979, and set career highs in runs (109), hits (166), triples (9), RBI (78) and stolen bases (33) while playing in all 162 games. He became the first Mariner to have at least 15 home runs and stolen bases before the All-Star break; no Mariner would do so again for 19 years. Following the season, he was traded to the New York Yankees with pitcher Jim Lewis for Rick Anderson, Jim Beattie, Juan Beníquez and Jerry Narron. He left the Mariners with the club record for most runs scored in a season (109 in 1979) and he is tied for club records for runs and walks in a game.

Jones was named on the 50 greatest Mariners players in 2026.

=== New York Yankees ===
Jones was batting .223 with nine home runs and 42 RBI playing center and batting second in the Yankees' lineup when he separated his shoulder on August 25, 1980 after crashing into the outfield wall in Oakland–Alameda County Coliseum chasing a Tony Armas fly ball. He also suffered a concussion on the play. The Yankees won 103 games that season to win the American League East, but Jones was unable to appear in the postseason as his injury required season-ending surgery. He sued Oakland Athletics owner Charlie Finley, the city of Oakland Alameda County, and the American League after the season.

At one point during the Winter Meetings, Jones was rumored to be heading to the Boston Red Sox in a rare Red Sox–Yankees deal. However, following the Yankees' signing of Dave Winfield as a free agent, the deal fell through. Instead, Jones was dealt to the San Diego Padres the following spring with Joe Lefebvre, Tim Lollar and Chris Welsh for Jerry Mumphrey and John Pacella.

=== San Diego Padres ===
The Padres finished in last place in both halves of the strike-shortened 1981 season. Jones batted .249 and tied for the team lead with 53 runs scored. He was batting .312 with 11 home runs and 50 RBI at the 1982 All-Star break to earn the second and final All-Star nod of his career. He was the Padres' sole representative despite the fact that San Diego was in second place in the National League West at the time. In his only at-bat, he led off the third inning with a triple and scored on a Pete Rose sacrifice fly. Jones was a fan favorite on the 1982 Padres, and Padre yellow "Rupe's Troops" T-shirts were a frequent sight during the season.

Jones played in 133 games for the Padres in 1983, the fewest he played in a full season uninterrupted by injury. He was a free agent at the end of the season, and when the Padres acquired Carmelo Martínez from the Chicago Cubs at the Winter Meetings, Jones became expendable.

=== Detroit Tigers ===
Jones spent spring training in 1984 with the Pittsburgh Pirates but failed to make the club. A week into the season, he signed with the Detroit Tigers. He began the season assigned to Triple-A with the Evansville Triplets; a .313 batting average, nine home runs and 45 RBIs earned him a call up to the majors by the beginning of June. He spent the rest of the season platooning with Larry Herndon in left field and backing up for Chet Lemon in center. On June 24, Jones hit a home run that cleared the right field roof of Tiger Stadium off Milwaukee Brewers right-hander Tom Tellmann. For the season, Jones batted .284 with 37 RBI and nine home runs, six of which came at Tiger Stadium to earn him the nickname "Rooftop" Ruppert.

The 1984 Tigers won 104 games and coasted into the postseason. Jones went hitless in eight at-bats in the American League Championship Series (ALCS) and World Series, facing his former club, the Padres. Detroit won the series. He became a free agent at the end of the season. The Tigers believed that he was a part-time player at this stage of his career and were only willing to pay him as such. After some bitter negotiation between Jones and the Tigers organization, he signed with the California Angels.

=== California Angels ===
Jones served as a fourth outfielder and designated hitter (DH) his first season in California. His 21 home runs were second only to Reggie Jackson. He and Jackson switched roles in 1986, with Jackson assuming DH duties and Jones earning most of his playing time in right field. The Angels won the American League West that year, earning Jones his second trip to the postseason, but lost the 1986 ALCS to Boston in heart-breaking fashion. Jones collected three hits in the ALCS, scoring four runs and driving in two.

His role became far more diminished in 1987 as he didn't even log his first plate appearance until the eighth game of the season. He finished his final MLB season with eight home runs and 28 RBIs in 213 plate appearances.

=== 1988: minor leagues ===
Jones was invited to the Milwaukee Brewers' spring training camp as a non-roster invitee in 1988. Though he hit well, he failed to make the club. He signed a minor league deal with the Texas Rangers in the beginning of May, and earned American Association Player of the Week honors his second week with the Oklahoma City 89ers. After 50 games, he left for Japan, signing with the Hanshin Tigers. He returned to Oklahoma City in 1989, but with a torn rotator cuff and a torn labrum, he called it quits after 27 games.

== Personal life ==
Following his playing career, Jones worked selling insurance in the San Diego area, retiring in around 2018. He is married.

With the Mariners in 1978, Jones recorded interviews with other ballplayers for KYAC in Seattle.
