= Marty Decker =

American baseball player (born 1957)

- Pitcher
- Born: June 7, 1957 (age 68); Upland, California
- Batted: Right Threw: Right

MLB debut
- September 20, 1983, for the San Diego Padres

Last MLB appearance
- October 2, 1983, for the San Diego Padres

MLB statistics
- Win–loss record: 0–0
- Earned run average: 2.08
- Strikeouts: 9
- Stats at Baseball Reference

Teams
- San Diego Padres (1983)

Dee Martin Decker (born June 7, 1957) is a former Major League Baseball pitcher who appeared in four games for the San Diego Padres in 1983. He batted and threw right-handed.

== Early life ==
Decker was born in Upland, California. He attended Placer High School in Auburn, California and later Point Loma Nazarene University in San Diego.

== Playing career ==
Decker was drafted by the Philadelphia Phillies in the 23rd round of the 1980 amateur draft. By 1983 he was playing for the Triple-A Portland Beavers. Late in the 1983 season Decker was one of the "players to be named later" (PTBNL) the Phillies sent to the San Diego Padres in exchange for Sixto Lezcano and a PTBNL from the Padres.

The Padres immediately assigned Decker to the major league club, where he appeared in four games from September 20–October 2. He spent the next two seasons with the Triple-A Las Vegas Stars, and left American professional baseball following the 1985 season at age 28.
