= Steve Fireovid =

American baseball player (born 1957)

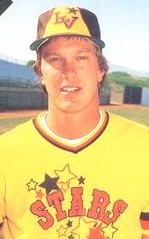
- Pitcher
- Born: June 6, 1957 (age 68); Bryan, Ohio, U.S.
- Batted: Switch Threw: Right

MLB debut
- September 6, 1981, for the San Diego Padres

Last MLB appearance
- April 14, 1992, for the Texas Rangers

MLB statistics
- Win–loss record: 3–1
- Earned run average: 3.39
- Strikeouts: 27
- Stats at Baseball Reference

Teams
- San Diego Padres (1981, 1983); Philadelphia Phillies (1984); Chicago White Sox (1985); Seattle Mariners (1986); Texas Rangers (1992)

Stephen John Fireovid (born June 6, 1957), is an American former professional baseball pitcher, who played in Major League Baseball (MLB) for the San Diego Padres, Philadelphia Phillies, Chicago White Sox, Seattle Mariners, and Texas Rangers, in all or part of six seasons, between 1981 and 1992. He never pitched in more than 10 games in any one MLB season.

== Career ==
He played college baseball at Miami University in Oxford, Ohio, from 1976 to 1978. In 1977, he played collegiate summer baseball with the Falmouth Commodores of the Cape Cod Baseball League.

In 1990, while pitching for the Montreal Expos’ Triple-A affiliate Indianapolis Indians, Fireovid composed a journal of his experiences. The journal was turned into a book, The 26th Man: One Minor League Pitcher's Pursuit of a Dream, in 1991. The book was co-authored by Mark Winegardner. Fireovid's career is also profiled with a chapter in the book Journeymen: 24 Bittersweet Tales of Short Major League Sports Careers by Kurt Dusterberg.

In 1995, Fireovid was a replacement player in spring training for the Florida Marlins during the ongoing strike.

Fireovid was initially married to Patty, with whom he has three children, Joseph, Samuel, and Thomas. Subsequently, he wed Michele and had two children, Adam and Rachel.
