= Doug Gwosdz =

American baseball player (born 1960)

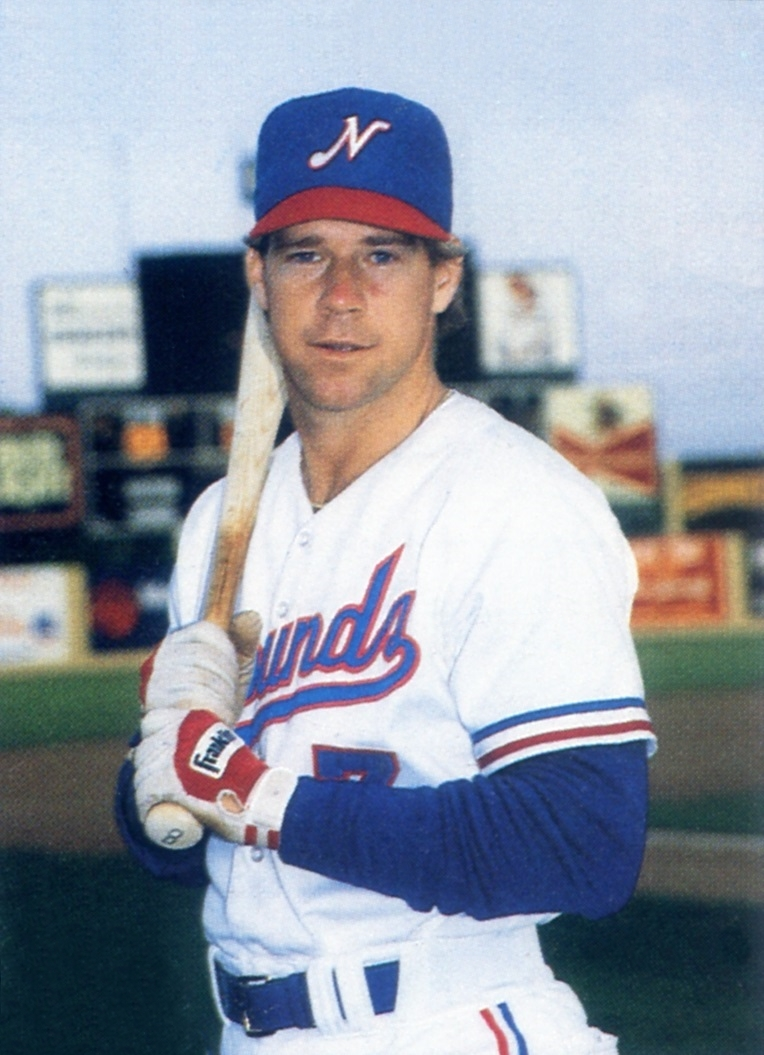
- Gwosdz with the Nashville Sounds in 1988
- Catcher
- Born: June 20, 1960 (age 66); Houston, Texas, U.S.
- Batted: Right Threw: Right

MLB debut
- August 17, 1981, for the San Diego Padres

Last MLB appearance
- September 24, 1984, for the San Diego Padres

MLB statistics
- Batting average: .144
- Runs: 9
- Hits: 15
- Stats at Baseball Reference

Teams
- San Diego Padres (1981–1984)

Doug Wayne Gwosdz (/ɡuːʃ/ GOOSH; born June 20, 1960), nicknamed "Eyechart", is an American former professional baseball catcher.

Gwosdz played during four seasons at the Major League Baseball (MLB) for the San Diego Padres. He was drafted by the Padres in the 2nd round of the 1978 MLB draft. Gwosdz played his first professional season with their Class-A (Short Season) Walla Walla Padres in 1978, and his last with the Cincinnati Reds' Triple-A Nashville Sounds in 1989.

His nickname is because his last name resembles a line on an eyechart.
