= Dave Edwards (baseball) =

American baseball player (born 1954)

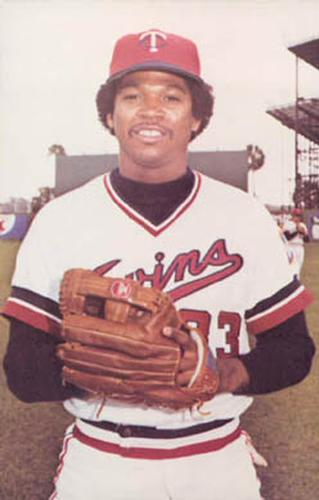
- Outfielder
- Born: February 24, 1954 (age 72); Los Angeles, California, U.S.
- Batted: Right Threw: Right

MLB debut
- September 11, 1978, for the Minnesota Twins

Last MLB appearance
- October 2, 1982, for the San Diego Padres

MLB statistics
- Batting average: .238
- Home runs: 14
- Runs batted in: 73
- Stats at Baseball Reference

Teams
- Minnesota Twins (1978–1980); San Diego Padres (1981–1982)

David Leonard Edwards (born February 24, 1954) is an American former professional baseball outfielder. He played all or parts of five seasons in Major League Baseball (MLB) for the Minnesota Twins and San Diego Padres from 1978 until 1982.

Edwards has two siblings who also played in the major leagues, twin brothers Mike and Marshall Edwards.

In 321 games over five seasons, Edwards posted a .238 batting average (152-for-640) with 95 runs, 14 home runs and 73 RBI. He finished his career with a .958 fielding percentage playing at all three outfield positions.
