= Redwood Pioneers =

- 1980–1985; Rohnert Park, California

Minor league affiliations
- Class: Class A (1980–1985)
- League: California League (1980–1985)

Major league affiliations
- Team: California Angels

Minor league titles
- League titles (1): 1983

Team data
- Name: Redwood Pioneers (1980–1985)
- Colors: Red, gold, white
- Mascot: The Redwood Rooster (1980-1981); Pioneer Pete (1982-1985)
- Ballpark: Rohnert Park Stadium (1981–1985)

The Redwood Pioneers were a minor league baseball of California League. They were part of the California Angels farm system. The Pioneers played in Rohnert Park, California during the early 1980s (1980–85). The team produced players such as Kirk McCaskill, Mark McLemore and Devon White. After the 1985 season, the Pioneers relocated to become the Palm Springs Angels.

== Ballpark ==
The team originally played at a field adjacent to Mountain Shadows Middle School, and then at Rohnert Park Stadium when it was completed in 1981. The stadium was torn down in 2005.

== Notable players ==
- Don Aase (1984) MLB All-Star
- Jack Howell (1984)
- Kirk McCaskill (1983)
- Mark McLemore (1984)
- Ed Ott (1983)
- Dick Schofield (1982)
- Devon White (1984) 7x Gold Glove; 3x MLB All-Star
