= Jim Skaalen =

Jim Arnold Skaalen (b. July 6, 1954, in Holland, Michigan) is a former Major League Baseball hitting coach for the Milwaukee Brewers and the Oakland A's.

== Career ==
Skaalen played professionally for three seasons in the Baltimore Orioles organization and batted .246 with 15 HR and 123 RBIs in 251 games.

=== Coaching ===
He began his coaching career in 1981 at Single-A Daytona Beach and managed in the minor leagues for the San Diego (1982–86) and Texas (1987–89) organizations.

Skaalen has also served as Minor League Hitting Instructor for Texas (1990), Coordinator of Minor League Instruction for Seattle (1991–96), Director of Player Development for the Padres (1997–99) and Minor League Hitting Coordinator for the Brewers (2000–06).

In his first season on a Major League coaching staff in 2007, the Brewers hit a franchise record and ML-leading 231 home runs.

Skaalen joined the A's in December 2008 after spending the previous two seasons as the Brewers' hitting coach.
