= Terry Kennedy (baseball) =

American baseball player (born 1956)

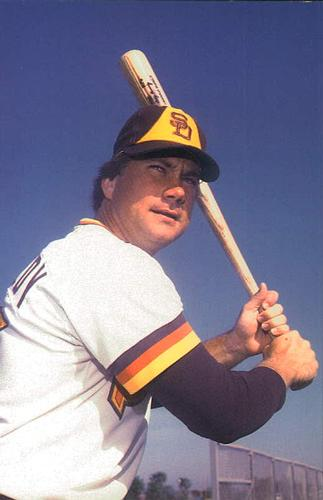
- Catcher
- Born: June 4, 1956 (age 69); Euclid, Ohio, U.S.
- Batted: Left Threw: Right

MLB debut
- September 4, 1978, for the St. Louis Cardinals

Last MLB appearance
- October 6, 1991, for the San Francisco Giants

MLB statistics
- Batting average: .264
- Home runs: 113
- Runs batted in: 628
- Stats at Baseball Reference

Teams
- St. Louis Cardinals (1978–1980); San Diego Padres (1981–1986); Baltimore Orioles (1987–1988); San Francisco Giants (1989–1991)

Career highlights and awards
- 4× All-Star (1981, 1983, 1985, 1987); Silver Slugger Award (1983)

Terrence Edward Kennedy (born June 4, 1956) is an American former Major League Baseball catcher who played for the St. Louis Cardinals (1978–1980), San Diego Padres (1981–1986), Baltimore Orioles (1987–1988) and San Francisco Giants (1989–1991). He was a four-time All-Star, three times with the Padres and once with the Orioles. Kennedy batted left-handed and threw right-handed. He is the son of former major league player and manager Bob Kennedy.

== Early life ==
Born in Euclid, Ohio, Kennedy attended St. Mary's High School in Phoenix, Arizona before playing college baseball at Florida State University. He was a two-time All-American and The Sporting News College Baseball Player of the Year in 1977. Kennedy was inducted into the FSU Athletics Hall of Fame in 1982 and The National College Baseball Hall of Fame in 2021.

== Career ==
In a 14-year major league career, Kennedy hit .264 with 113 home runs and 628 RBI in 1491 games. Kennedy tied Johnny Bench's National League mark of 40 doubles in a season in 1982. That same year, Kennedy won the Silver Slugger Award. He appeared in four All-Star Games (1981, 1983, 1985, and 1987). He also played in two World Series, with the Padres in 1984 and with the Giants in 1989. Terry and his father, Bob, became the first father and son duo to drive in runs in a World Series when Terry drove in two against the Tigers in 1984 in his first at bat.

Throughout most of his career, Kennedy wore #16, which he was assigned on his first day in major league camp with the Cardinals. When he came to the Orioles, he could not get #16 because veteran pitcher Scott McGregor already had the number, so he wore #15 during his time with them. He reverted to #16 during his time with the Giants, during which he took part in the earthquake-interrupted 1989 World Series.

After his playing days, Kennedy managed, coached, and instructed in the minor leagues for the St. Louis Cardinals, Montreal Expos, Seattle Mariners, Chicago Cubs, Los Angeles Dodgers and San Diego Padres, as well as the Independent Leagues. Kennedy was voted Manager of the Year twice, including Baseball America Manager of the Year in 1998, when he led the Iowa Cubs to a first-place finish.

In his last job, before retirement, Kennedy was a Major League scout with the Chicago Cubs.

== See also ==
- List of second-generation Major League Baseball players

Preceded by Claudell Washington	National League Player of the Month; April, 1983	Succeeded by Darrell Evans
