= Rohnert Park Stadium =

Former baseball stadium in California

- Interactive map of Rohnert Park Stadium
- Coordinates: 38.35241°N 122.72193°W
- Operator: Rohnert Park Recreation
- Capacity: 4,150
- Surface: Natural grass

Construction
- Groundbreaking: 1980
- Opened: 1981
- Renovated: 1995 (renovation including installing the former Oakland Coliseum outfield bleachers)
- Closed: 2002
- Demolished: 2005
- Cost: $2 million (1980), $500,000 (1995)

Tenants
- Redwood Pioneers (California League) (1981-1985); Sonoma County Crushers (Western Baseball League) (1995-2002)

Rohnert Park Stadium was a stadium in Rohnert Park, California. It was primarily used for baseball and was the home field of the Redwood Pioneers and the Sonoma County Crushers minor league baseball teams. It was also a soccer field for the North Bay Breakers, a semi-pro soccer team.

It was built in 1981 and held 4,150 people. The stadium was torn down in 2005, and the land was redeveloped adjacent to a Costco.
