= Sixto Lezcano =

Puerto Rican baseball player (born 1953)

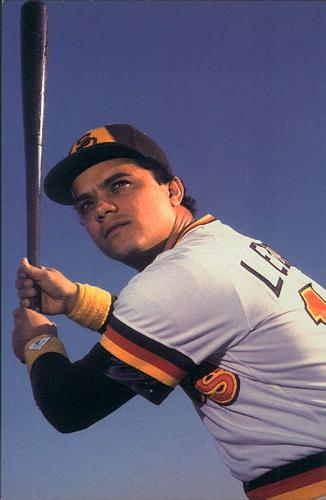
- Lezcano in 1983
- Right fielder
- Born: November 28, 1953 (age 72); Arecibo, Puerto Rico
- Batted: Right Threw: Right

Professional debut
- MLB: September 10, 1974, for the Milwaukee Brewers
- NPB: April 19, 1987, for the Yokohama Taiyo Whales

Last appearance
- MLB: September 29, 1985, for the Pittsburgh Pirates
- NPB: 1987, for the Yokohama Taiyo Whales

MLB statistics
- Batting average: .271
- Home runs: 148
- Runs batted in: 591

NPB statistics
- Batting average: .217
- Home runs: 3
- Runs batted in: 7
- Stats at Baseball Reference

Teams
- Milwaukee Brewers (1974–1980); St. Louis Cardinals (1981); San Diego Padres (1982–1983); Philadelphia Phillies (1983–1984); Pittsburgh Pirates (1985); Yokohama Taiyo Whales (1987)

Career highlights and awards
- Gold Glove Award (1979); Milwaukee Brewers Wall of Honor

Sixto Joaquin Lezcano Curras (born November 28, 1953) is a Puerto Rican former professional baseball outfielder, who played in Major League Baseball (MLB) for 12 seasons (1974–1985). He played for five MLB teams and won a Gold Glove during his career.

Born in Arecibo, Puerto Rico, Lezcano attended Colegio San Jose High School in Río Piedras, Puerto Rico.

== Playing career ==
In 1970, at age 16, Lezcano was signed as an amateur free agent by the Milwaukee Brewers. After spending four seasons in their minor league system, he reached the big leagues for the first time in 1974; Lezcano made his big league debut on September 10, 1974.

Lezcano became the Brewers' starting right fielder in 1975, a job he held for the next six seasons. Lezcano showed a particularly strong throwing arm in right field, and led American League (AL) outfielders in assists, in 1978.

Lezcano’s best offensive numbers came in 1979, when he finished among the top 10 in the AL in batting average and home runs, and finished with the third-highest slugging percentage in the American League. That season, Lezcano was honored for his defensive skills with the only Gold Glove of his major league career.

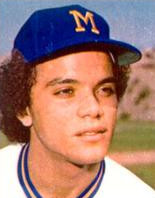
Lezcano with the Milwaukee Brewers

While with the Brewers, Lezcano became the only player in Major League Baseball history to hit a grand slam on Opening Day twice, doing so in 1978 and 1980.

After the 1980 season, Lezcano was part of a blockbuster 7-player trade with the St. Louis Cardinals, being one of four players traded in exchange for Rollie Fingers, Pete Vuckovich, and Ted Simmons. Lezcano wasn't able to consistently crack the starting lineup in St. Louis, and batted .266 with the Cardinals in 1981.

Lezcano was involved in another major trade after the 1981 season, being traded to the San Diego Padres with Garry Templeton for Ozzie Smith. Lezcano hit well in his first year with the Padres, and was among the top 10 in the National League (NL) in on-base percentage. However, Lezcano’s numbers fell off with the Padres in the 1983 season, and he was traded to the Philadelphia Phillies late in the year in exchange for four players to be named later.

Lezcano joined a Phillies team which won the NL pennant in 1983. He platooned with Joe Lefebvre during the postseason, and homered off Rick Honeycutt during the 1983 National League Championship Series (NLCS). Lezcano had one base hit in eight at-bats in the Phillies' 5-game World Series loss to the Baltimore Orioles.

Lezcano continued to platoon with Philadelphia in 1984 before leaving the team as a free agent, following the season. He signed with the Pittsburgh Pirates in 1985 and served as one of the team's primary pinch hitters. During spring training 1986, Pittsburgh released Lezcano, ending his Major League career.

In 1,291 games over 12 seasons, Lezcano posted a .271 batting average (1,122-for-4,134) with 560 runs, 184 doubles, 34 triples, 148 home runs, 591 runs batted in (RBI), 37 stolen bases, 576 bases on balls, .360 on-base percentage, and .440 slugging percentage. Defensively, he recorded a .980 fielding percentage playing at all three outfield positions. In the 1983 postseason, Lezcano hit .238 (5-for-21) in eight games with two runs, one home run, two RBI, and one walk.

In 1987, Lezcano joined the Yokohama Taiyō Whales of the Nippon Professional Baseball League (NPBL); however, he achieved only limited success while playing in Japan.

== Coaching career ==
Lezcano was the batting coach for the Danville Braves (the Rookie league affiliate of the Atlanta Braves).

== Personal life ==
Lezcano’s cousin, Carlos Lezcano, played two seasons in MLB for the Chicago Cubs.
