= 1979 Seattle Mariners season =

1979 Seattle Mariners
- League: American League
- Division: West
- Ballpark: Kingdome
- City: Seattle, Washington
- Record: 67–95 (.414)
- Divisional place: 6th
- Owners: Stanley Golub, Danny Kaye, Walter Schoenfeld, Lester Smith, James Stillwell, Jr., James A. Walsh
- General managers: Lou Gorman
- Managers: Darrell Johnson
- Television: KING-TV 5
- Radio: KVI 570 AM (Dave Niehaus, Ken Wilson, Bill Freehan)

The 1979 Seattle Mariners season was the franchise's third since its creation. The Mariners ended the season in sixth place in the American League West with a record of 67–95 (.414). The Mariners hosted the All-Star Game on Tuesday, July 17.

== Offseason ==
- December 5, 1978: Enrique Romo, Rick Jones, and Tom McMillan were traded by the Mariners to the Pittsburgh Pirates for Odell Jones, Rafael Vásquez, and Mario Mendoza.
- December 8, 1978: Craig Reynolds was traded by the Mariners to the Houston Astros for Floyd Bannister.
- December 21, 1978: Mario Díaz was signed as an amateur free agent by the Mariners.
- January 27, 1979: Willie Horton was signed as a free agent by the Mariners.
- February 8, 1979: Jim Todd was released by the Mariners.
- February 22, 1979: Mike Davey was purchased by the Mariners from the Atlanta Braves.

== Regular season ==
=== Season standings ===
AL West
Team	W	L	Pct.	GB	Home	Road
California Angels	88	74	.543	—	49‍–‍32	39‍–‍42
Kansas City Royals	85	77	.525	3	46‍–‍35	39‍–‍42
Texas Rangers	83	79	.512	5	44‍–‍37	39‍–‍42
Minnesota Twins	82	80	.506	6	39‍–‍42	43‍–‍38
Chicago White Sox	73	87	.456	14	33‍–‍46	40‍–‍41
Seattle Mariners	67	95	.414	21	36‍–‍45	31‍–‍50
Oakland Athletics	54	108	.333	34	31‍–‍50	23‍–‍58

=== Record vs. opponents ===
1979 American League record Sources:
Team	BAL	BOS	CAL	CWS	CLE	DET	KC	MIL	MIN	NYY	OAK	SEA	TEX	TOR
Baltimore	—	8–5	9–3	8–3	8–5	7–6	6–6	8–5	8–4	5–6	8–4	10–2	6–6	11–2
Boston	5–8	—	5–7	5–6	6–7	8–5	8–4	8–4	9–3	5–8	9–3	8–4	6–6	9–4
California	3–9	7–5	—	9–4	6–6	4–8	7–6	7–5	9–4	7–5	10–3	7–6	5–8	7–5
Chicago	3–8	6–5	4–9	—	6–6	3–9	5–8	5–7	5–8	4–8	9–4	5–8	11–2	7–5
Cleveland	5–8	7–6	6–6	6–6	—	6–6	6–6	4–9	8–4	5–8	8–4	7–5	5–7	8–5
Detroit	6–7	5–8	8–4	9–3	6–6	—	5–7	6–7	4–8	7–6	7–5	7–5	6–6	9–4
Kansas City	6–6	4–8	6–7	8–5	6–6	7–5	—	5–7	7–6	5–7	9–4	7–6	6–7	9–3
Milwaukee	5–8	4–8	5–7	7–5	9–4	7–6	7–5	—	8–4	9–4	6–6	9–3	9–3	10–3
Minnesota	4–8	3–9	4–9	8–5	4–8	8–4	6–7	4–8	—	7–5	9–4	10–3	4–9	11–1
New York	6–5	8–5	5–7	8–4	8–5	6–7	7–5	4–9	5–7	—	9–3	6–6	8–4	9–4
Oakland	4–8	3–9	3–10	4–9	4–8	5–7	4–9	6–6	4–9	3–9	—	8–5	2–11	4–8
Seattle	2–10	4–8	6–7	8–5	5–7	5–7	6–7	3–9	3–10	6–6	5–8	—	6–7	8–4
Texas	6–6	6–6	8–5	2–11	7–5	6–6	7–6	3–9	9–4	4–8	11–2	7–6	—	7–5
Toronto	2–11	4–9	5–7	5–7	5–8	4–9	3–9	3–10	1–11	4–9	8–4	4–8	5–7	—

=== Opening Day lineup ===
1. Julio Cruz, 2B
2. Bill Stein, 3B
3. Dan Meyer, 1B
4. Leon Roberts, RF
5. Willie Horton, DH
6. Ruppert Jones, CF
7. Tom Paciorek, LF
8. Larry Cox, C
9. Mario Mendoza, SS
- Glenn Abbott, starting pitcher

=== Notable transactions ===
- April 10, 1979: Bobby Valentine signed as a free agent by the Mariners.
- June 5, 1979: 1979 Major League Baseball draft
  - Mike Hart was drafted by the Mariners in the 13th round.
  - Bud Black was drafted by the Mariners in the 17th round.
  - Tom Henke was drafted by the Mariners in the 20th round, but did not sign.
- June 7, 1979: Paul Mitchell was traded by the Mariners to the Milwaukee Brewers for Randy Stein.
- July 6, 1979: Juan Bernhardt was traded by the Mariners to the Chicago White Sox for Rich Hinton.

=== All-Star Game ===
The 1979 Major League Baseball All-Star Game was the 50th playing of the midsummer classic between the all-stars of the American League (AL) and National League (NL), the two leagues comprising Major League Baseball. The game was held on July 17, 1979, at the Kingdome, the home of the Mariners. The National League defeated the American League, 7–6.

=== Roster ===
1979 Seattle Mariners
Roster
Pitchers: 17 Glenn Abbott; 38 Floyd Bannister; 29 Roy Branch; 35 Joe Decker; 24 Rob Dressler; 37 Rich Hinton; 40 Rick Honeycutt; 36 Odell Jones; 26 Jim Lewis; 27 Byron McLaughlin; 34 Paul Mitchell; 25 John Montague; 20 Mike Parrott; 41 Shane Rawley; 33 Randy Stein; 35 Wayne Twitchell; 21 Rafael Vásquez	Catchers: 5 Larry Cox; 15 Bob Stinson; Infielders: 12 Charlie Beamon; 23 Bruce Bochte; 6 Julio Cruz; 11 Mario Mendoza; 7 Dan Meyer; 10 Larry Milbourne; 1 Bill Stein; 2 Bobby Valentine	Outfielders: 19 Rod Craig; 43 John Hale; 9 Ruppert Jones; 14 Tom Paciorek; 8 Leon Roberts; 18 Joe Simpson; Other batters: 26 Juan Bernhardt; 53 Willie Horton	Manager: 22 Darrell Johnson; Coaches: 31 Don Bryant (Bullpen); 30 Bill Mazeroski (Third base); 28 Vada Pinson (First base/Hitting); 32 Wes Stock (Pitching)

== Game log ==
=== Regular season ===
Legend
	Mariners win
	Mariners loss
	Postponement
	Eliminated from playoff race
**Bold**	Mariners team member

1979 regular season game log: 67–95 (Home: 36–45; Away: 31–50)
April: 8–15 (Home: 8–10; Away: 0–5)

#	Date	Time (PT)	Opponent	Score	Win	Loss	Save	Time of Game	Attendance	Record	Box/ Streak

May: 10–18 (Home: 4–8; Away: 6–10)

#	Date	Time (PT)	Opponent	Score	Win	Loss	Save	Time of Game	Attendance	Record	Box/ Streak

June: 16–12 (Home: 9–6; Away: 7–6)

#	Date	Time (PT)	Opponent	Score	Win	Loss	Save	Time of Game	Attendance	Record	Box/ Streak

July: 11–18 (Home: 4–5; Away: 7–13)

#	Date	Time (PT)	Opponent	Score	Win	Loss	Save	Time of Game	Attendance	Record	Box/ Streak
—	July 17	5:30 p.m. PDT	50th All-Star Game	National League vs. American League (Kingdome, Seattle, Washington)							

August: 12–16 (Home: 7–8; Away: 5–8)

#	Date	Time (PT)	Opponent	Score	Win	Loss	Save	Time of Game	Attendance	Record	Box/ Streak

September: 10–16 (Home: 4–8; Away: 6–8)

#	Date	Time (PT)	Opponent	Score	Win	Loss	Save	Time of Game	Attendance	Record	Box/ Streak

== Player stats ==
= Indicates team leader

=== Batting ===
==== Starters by position ====
Note: Pos = Position; G = Games played; AB = At bats; H = Hits; Avg. = Batting average; HR = Home runs; RBI = Runs batted in

Pos	Player	G	AB	H	Avg.	HR	RBI
C	Larry Cox	100	293	63	.215	4	36
1B	Bruce Bochte	150	554	175	.316	16	100
2B	Julio Cruz	107	414	112	.271	1	29
3B	Dan Meyer	144	525	146	.278	20	74
SS	Mario Mendoza	148	373	74	.198	1	24
LF	Tom Paciorek	103	310	83	.267	6	42
CF	Ruppert Jones	162	622	166	.267	21	78
RF	Leon Roberts	140	450	122	.271	15	54
DH	Willie Horton	162	646	180	.279	29	106

==== Other batters ====
Note: G = Games played; AB = At bats; H = Hits; Avg. = Batting average; HR = Home runs; RBI = Runs batted in

Player	G	AB	H	Avg.	HR	RBI
Larry Milbourne	123	356	99	.278	2	26
Joe Simpson	120	265	75	.283	2	27
Bill Stein	88	250	62	.248	7	27
Bob Stinson	95	247	60	.243	6	28
Bobby Valentine	62	98	27	.276	0	7
John Hale	54	63	14	.222	2	7
Rod Craig	16	52	20	.385	0	6
Charlie Beamon	27	25	5	.200	0	0
Juan Bernhardt	1	1	1	1.000	0	0

=== Pitching ===
==== Starting pitchers ====
Note: G = Games pitched; IP = Innings pitched; W = Wins; L = Losses; ERA = Earned run average; SO = Strikeouts

Player	G	IP	W	L	ERA	SO
Mike Parrott	38	229.1	14	12	3.77	127
Rick Honeycutt	33	194.0	11	12	4.04	83
Floyd Bannister	30	182.1	10	15	4.05	115
Odell Jones	25	118.2	3	11	6.07	72
Glenn Abbott	23	116.2	4	10	5.17	25
Roy Branch	2	11.1	0	1	7.94	6

==== Other pitchers ====
Note: G = Games pitched; IP = Innings pitched; W = Wins; L = Losses; ERA = Earned run average; SO = Strikeouts

Player	G	IP	W	L	ERA	SO
Rob Dressler	21	104.0	3	2	4.93	36
Paul Mitchell	10	36.2	1	4	4.42	18
Joe Decker	9	27.1	0	1	4.28	12
Wayne Twitchell	4	13.2	0	2	5.27	5

==== Relief pitchers ====
Note: G = Games pitched; W = Wins; L = Losses; SV = Saves; ERA = Earned run average; SO = Strikeouts

Player	G	W	L	SV	ERA	SO
Byron McLaughlin	47	7	7	14	4.22	74
Shane Rawley	48	5	9	11	3.84	48
John Montague	41	6	4	1	5.57	60
Randy Stein	23	2	3	0	5.88	39
Rich Hinton	14	0	2	0	5.40	7
Rafael Vásquez	9	1	0	0	5.06	9
Jim Lewis	2	0	0	0	15.43	0

== Awards and honors ==
=== All-Stars ===
1979 Major League Baseball All-Star Game

- Bruce Bochte, reserve

== Farm system ==
Level	Team	League	Manager
AAA	Spokane Indians	Pacific Coast League	Rene Lachemann
A	San Jose Missions	California League	Bob Didier
A	Alexandria Mariners	Carolina League	Bobby Floyd
A-Short Season	Bellingham Mariners	Northwest League	Jeff Scott

LEAGUE CHAMPIONS: San Jose
