= Ron LeFlore =

American baseball player (born 1948)

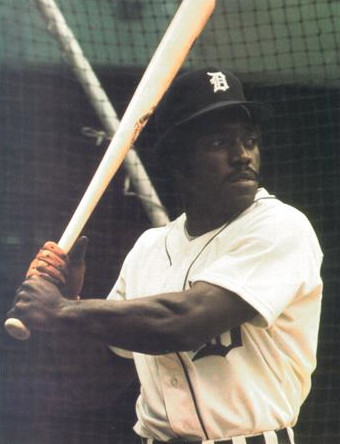
- LeFlore with the Detroit Tigers in 1975
- Center fielder
- Born: June 16, 1948 (age 78); Detroit, Michigan, U.S.
- Batted: Right Threw: Right

MLB debut
- August 1, 1974, for the Detroit Tigers

Last MLB appearance
- September 3, 1982, for the Chicago White Sox

MLB statistics
- Batting average: .288
- Home runs: 59
- Run batted in: 353
- Stolen bases: 455
- Stats at Baseball Reference

Teams
- Detroit Tigers (1974–1979); Montreal Expos (1980); Chicago White Sox (1981–1982)

Career highlights and awards
- All-Star (1976); 2× Stolen base leader (1978, 1980)

Ronald LeFlore (born June 16, 1948) is an American former Major League Baseball center fielder. He played six seasons with the Detroit Tigers before being traded to the Montreal Expos. LeFlore retired with the Chicago White Sox in 1982. He stole 455 bases in his career and was an American League All-Star selection in 1976.

A movie and book were made about LeFlore's rise to the major leagues after being an inmate at the Jackson State Penitentiary. One in a Million: The Ron LeFlore Story was a made-for-television movie starring LeVar Burton that aired on CBS in 1978. LeFlore is the cousin of former MLB outfielder Todd Steverson.

== Early life ==
LeFlore was born in Detroit, Michigan, and was arrested at an early age. Although his parents John and Georgia LeFlore were married, his father was an unemployed alcoholic who rarely took part in family life. His mother was a hard-working nurses' aide who held the family together financially and physically, even feeding Ron while he was a heroin addict and small-time drug dealer. He credits his mother's compassion for his survival during this period. He attended Detroit's Eastern High School.

He was introduced to shooting heroin in a neighborhood "shooting gallery". He dropped out of school and spent many nights breaking into the Stroh's Brewery on Gratiot Avenue, stealing beer and getting drunk with friends. After dropping out of school, he did not play any organized sports and rarely followed the Tigers, although he had been to Tiger Stadium at least once in childhood, sitting in the upper bleachers with his father. First arrested at 15, he was ultimately sentenced to 5–15 years in state prison at the State Prison of Southern Michigan (usually called Jackson State Penitentiary) for armed robbery of a local bar in January 1970 in which he carried a rifle.

== Prison discovery ==
Incarcerated on April 28, 1970, the first organized baseball league LeFlore played in was for inmates. Jimmy Karalla, a fellow inmate who was imprisoned for extortion, convinced his longtime friend Jimmy Butsicaris who co-owned the "Lindell AC", a Detroit bar frequented by Detroit sports celebrities, to speak to his good friend Billy Martin, then-manager of the Detroit Tigers, to ask him to observe LeFlore. Martin visited Jackson State Prison on May 23, 1973. Martin then helped LeFlore get permission for day-parole and a tryout at Tiger Stadium in June.

In July 1973 the Tigers signed LeFlore to a contract which enabled him to meet the conditions for parole. He was paid a $5,000 bonus and $500 per month for the rest of the 1973 season. Assigned to the Clinton Pilots in the Class A Midwest League, and managed by Jim Leyland, LeFlore hit .277.

The next year he played for the Lakeland Tigers in the Class A Florida State League, and after hitting .331 with 45 steals in 102 games was promoted to the Evansville Triplets of the Class AAA American Association, where he played nine games.

He made his major league debut with the Tigers on August 1, 1974.

== Playing career ==
LeFlore split time in center field in 1974 with veteran Tiger Mickey Stanley before taking over as the starter in 1975. Largely known as a base stealer, in his prime he also hit for average and moderate power. He, along with Mark Fidrych, were the primary reasons that the Tigers' attendance rose in 1976 by close to 5,000 per game over the previous year. Both players made the 1976 American League All-Star team, yet the team never finished higher than fourth in the American League East standings during LeFlore's tenure. In 1977, he hit 16 home runs and batted .325 – both career highs. But 1978 may have been his career year, when he led the league in singles (153), runs scored (126) and stolen bases (68), and finished second in hits (198), plate appearances (741) and at bats (666). He also set career highs in games played, plate appearances, at bats, RBIs, and walks.

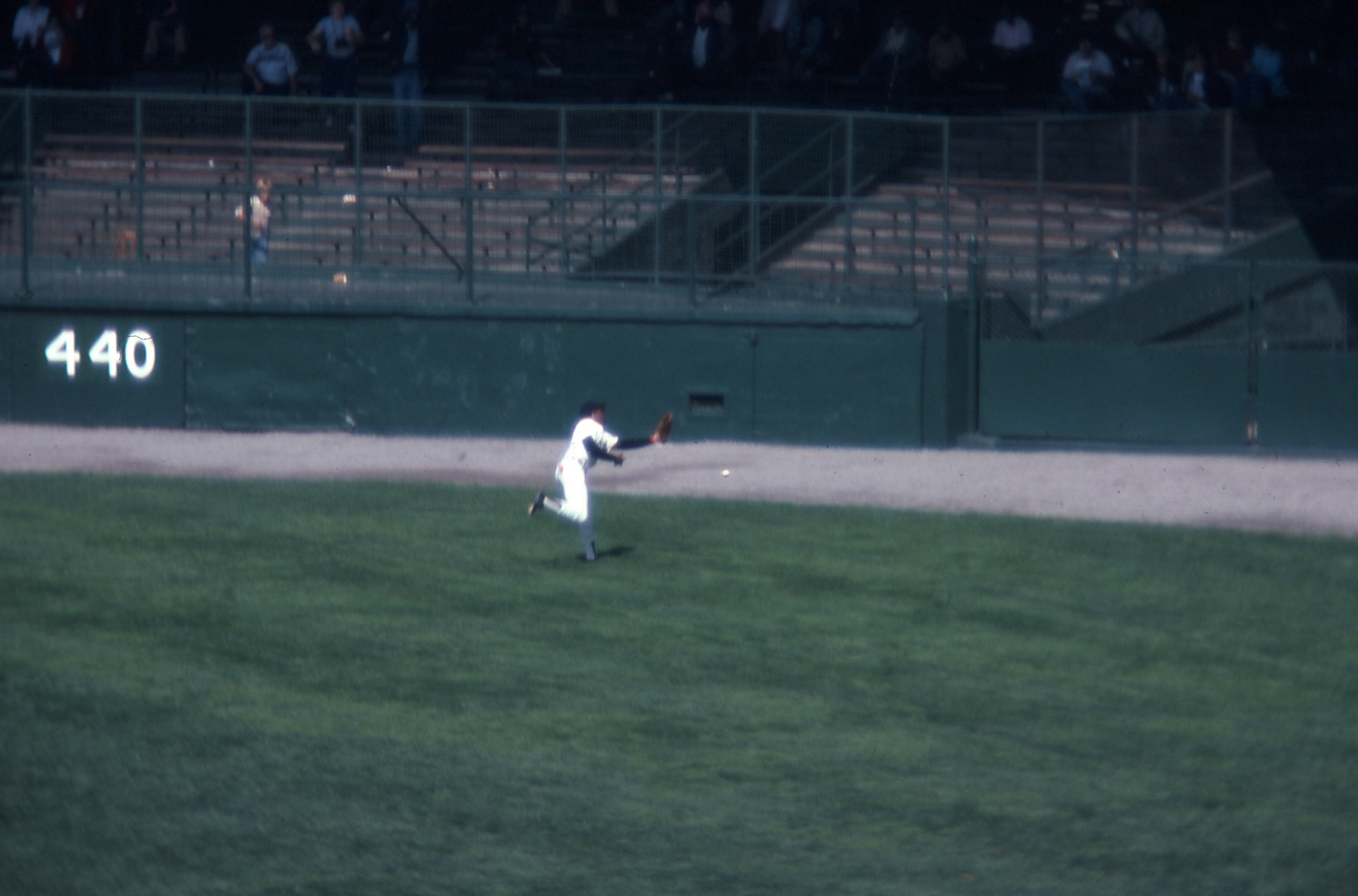
LeFlore playing in the outfield of Tiger Stadium, 1977

After the 1979 season, in which he hit .300 and stole 78 bases, LeFlore was traded to the Montreal Expos for Dan Schatzeder on December 7. In 1980, he came closest to playoff action as he stole a career-high 97 bases (becoming the first player to lead both leagues in steals) to help the Expos finish the season in second place, only a game behind the eventual World Series champion Philadelphia Phillies. His 97 steals made him only the fourth National League player since 1900 to have 95 or more steals in a season joining Maury Wills, Lou Brock and Omar Moreno (who stole 96 bases in 1980).

In 1981 he signed with the Chicago White Sox as a free agent, but he played in only a combined 173 games in his two years there. After failing to make the roster in the spring of 1983, he was released by the team on April 2 and he announced his retirement. Soon afterward, he revealed that he was actually four years older than he had previously admitted (i.e. being the age of 34 rather than 30), possibly giving some explanation for his rapid decline with the White Sox.

As of the end of the 2011 season, LeFlore's 1976, 1978 and 1979 seasons were tenth, sixth and third respectively on the Tigers' all-time single-season stolen base list and his 294 steals were fourth on the Tigers' career list. His 97 stolen bases for the Expos in 1980 are still a record for the Expos/Washington Nationals franchise. He also finished in the top ten in his league in triples, finishing as high as third in 1980 with 11. Despite his speed and in contrast to his above-average hitting, he was never adept in the field. In his career, he finished in the top five outfielders in errors every year except 1979, leading the league in outfield errors in 1974, 1976, 1980 and 1982 (despite playing in only 91 games in '82). His worst moment in the field was when he misplayed a ball into a four-base error. Notoriously, on August 1, 1982, in a game against the Boston Red Sox, LeFlore was in center field when in the sixth inning Boston leadoff hitter, catcher Gary Allenson, hit a soft liner off White Sox starter Jerry Koosman. As he drifted back for the catch, the ball struck him on the forehead near the bill of his cap, took a wild bounce and rolled away. By the time anyone got to it, Allenson had crossed the plate with an unearned run. LeFlore also struck out frequently, finishing in the top ten in his league in strikeouts five times (and second in the American League in 1975 with 139).

== Career statistics ==
In 1099 games over nine seasons, Leflore posted a .288 batting average (1283-for-4458) with 731 runs, 172 doubles, 57 triples, 59 home runs, 353 RBI, 455 stolen bases, 363 bases on balls, .342 on-base percentage and .392 slugging percentage. He finished his career with a .968 fielding percentage playing at center and left field.

== After playing career ==
In 1988 while working as a baggage handler for Eastern Airlines, LeFlore saw an ad for an umpire school run by MLB umpire Joe Brinkman. He attended the five-week course after which top graduates are assigned to whatever openings exist on the minor league level, hoping to make it back to the majors eventually as an umpire, but barely missed his opportunity.

In 1989, LeFlore played for the St. Petersburg Pelicans and Bradenton Explorers of the Senior Professional Baseball Association, hitting .328 in 44 games overall (11 with St. Petersburg and 33 with Bradenton). He was cut from the Pelicans because manager Bobby Tolan saw LeFlore as a negative influence and threat to the team's chemistry, views Tolan made clear to reporters after LeFlore's release. LeFlore played well for the Explorers but asked for and received his release that offseason because the team was moving to Daytona Beach and he had no interest in living there. In 1990, he played for the traveling Florida Tropics team of the SPBA. He played in 18 games, hit two home runs and drove in nine runs. He also had the second-highest batting average with .403 when the league folded.

In 1995, Leflore managed the Newburgh Night Hawks of the Northeast League to fourth place in the League, having a 28–41 record. Official baseball databases, including Stats Crew and The Baseball Cube, confirm that the Night Hawks played a total of 69 games that year.

On September 27, 1999, LeFlore was arrested at the closing ceremonies of Tiger Stadium for unpaid child support for his adult daughter and her mother. LeFlore had been living in St. Petersburg, Florida at the time, and ultimately was not jailed in exchange for making payments.

In 2000, LeFlore was hired as the manager of the now-defunct Cook County Cheetahs of the Frontier League. He also worked as a manager and coach in the Midwest and Northeastern leagues. In the spring of 2003, he was hired as manager for the Saskatoon Legends franchise in the fledgling Canadian Baseball League, a league that folded midway through its inaugural season.

On May 5, 2007, during an autograph signing, LeFlore was again arrested for failure to pay child support.

In the summer of 2011 LeFlore had his right leg amputated from the knee down due to complications caused by arterial vascular disease, a result of his having smoked cigarettes since he was a teenager, and lost 100 pounds as a result of three surgeries. He now uses a prosthetic leg and lives in St. Petersburg, Florida.

== See also ==
- List of Major League Baseball annual runs scored leaders
- List of Major League Baseball annual stolen base leaders
- List of Major League Baseball career stolen bases leaders
