= George Foster (baseball) =

American baseball player and scout (born 1948)

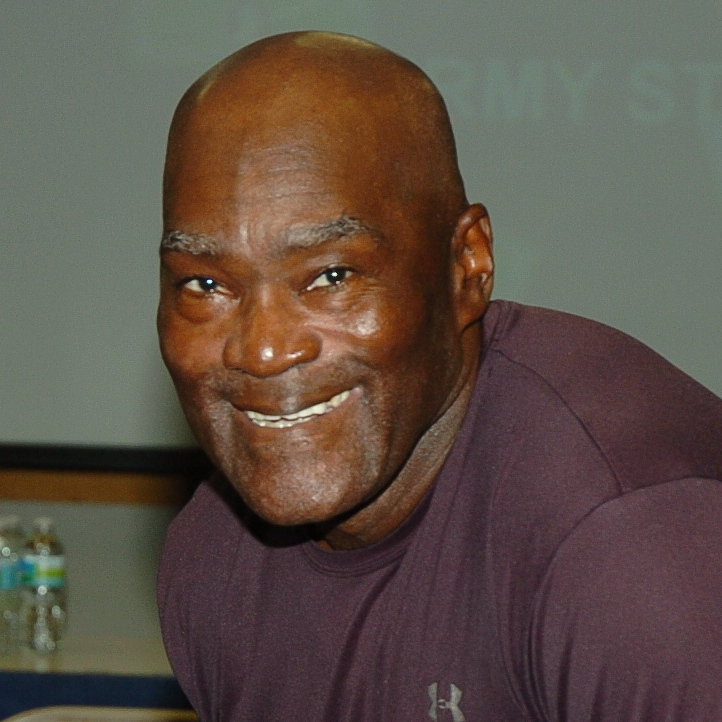
- Foster in 2011
- Left fielder
- Born: December 1, 1948 (age 77); Tuscaloosa, Alabama, U.S.
- Batted: Right Threw: Right

MLB debut
- September 10, 1969, for the San Francisco Giants

Last MLB appearance
- September 6, 1986, for the Chicago White Sox

MLB statistics
- Batting average: .274
- Home runs: 348
- Runs batted in: 1,239
- Stats at Baseball Reference

Teams
- San Francisco Giants (1969–1971); Cincinnati Reds (1971–1981); New York Mets (1982–1986); Chicago White Sox (1986)

Career highlights and awards
- 5× All-Star (1976–1979, 1981); 2× World Series champion (1975, 1976); NL MVP (1977); Silver Slugger Award (1981); 2× NL home run leader (1977, 1978); 3× NL RBI leader (1976–1978); Cincinnati Reds Hall of Fame

George Arthur Foster (born December 1, 1948) is an American former professional baseball player and scout. He played in Major League Baseball as an outfielder from 1969 through 1986, most notably as an integral member of the Cincinnati Reds, with whom he won two World Series championships, in 1975 and 1976. He also played for the San Francisco Giants, New York Mets and the Chicago White Sox.

A five-time All-Star, Foster was one of the most feared right-handed sluggers of his era, leading the National League in home runs twice (1977 and 1978), and in RBI three times (1976, 1977, and 1978). He won the National League's Most Valuable Player Award in 1977 and a Silver Slugger Award in 1981. In 2003, Foster was inducted into the Cincinnati Reds Hall of Fame.

== San Francisco Giants ==
Born in Tuscaloosa, Alabama, Foster attended Leuzinger High School in Lawndale, California. After just a single year at El Camino College, Foster was drafted by the San Francisco Giants in the third round (55th overall) of the 1968 Major League Baseball draft. After two seasons in their farm system, he debuted with the Giants at the age of 20 on September 10, 1969. He went 2-for-5 with one run batted in (RBI) as a pinch hitter and late inning defensive replacement. That year on September 22, Willie Mays pinch hit for Foster and hit his 600th career home run.

Foster returned to the Giants in September of the following year, hitting his first career home run off the San Diego Padres' Pat Dobson. Foster finally made an opening day roster in 1971 as a fourth outfielder behind Mays, Bobby Bonds and Ken Henderson, but shortly after the season started, Foster was traded to the Cincinnati Reds for shortstop Frank Duffy and pitcher Vern Geishert on May 29.

== Cincinnati Reds ==
Foster was immediately inserted into the starting line-up in center field, as starting center fielder Bobby Tolan was lost for the season with a torn Achilles tendon. In 104 games with the Reds, he batted .234 with 10 home runs and 50 RBI. He returned to a back-up role in 1972, platooning in right field with César Gerónimo, and managed just a .200 batting average, two home runs and 12 RBI in 59 games. The nucleus of the "Big Red Machine" began coming together that season, however, and the Reds returned to the post-season playoffs after a disappointing fourth-place finish in 1971. Foster played in the 1972 National League Championship Series against the Pittsburgh Pirates only as a pinch runner for Tony Pérez in Game 5 of the series; he scored the series-winning run on a wild pitch from Bob Moose. Foster appeared in Games 1 and 7 of the World Series against the Oakland Athletics, but did not log an at bat.

Foster spent the majority of the 1973 season with the Reds' Triple-A affiliate, the Indianapolis Indians, batting .262 with 15 home runs and 60 RBI in 134 games. and made a September return to the majors when the minor league season ended. He batted .282 with four home runs and 9 RBI in 17 games. He was not part of the Reds' post-season roster. Tolan had suffered through a poor 1973 season in which he batted just .206, and was traded that winter to the San Diego Padres for pitcher Clay Kirby. Foster, Merv Rettenmund and rookie Ken Griffey all took turns filling the hole the trade created in right field in 1974, with Foster batting .264 with seven home runs and 41 RBI in 106 games.

=== The "Big Red Machine" ===
Early in the 1975 season, Reds manager Sparky Anderson shifted perennial All-Star Pete Rose to third base, and used a platoon of Foster and Dan Driessen in left field. Foster soon won the everyday job with a .300 batting average, 23 home runs and 78 RBI in 134 games. With Foster now in left, the final piece of the "Big Red Machine" was in place. The Reds won 108 games that year, tying the 1970 World Series champion Baltimore Orioles for the most regular season wins that decade. They dominated the Pirates in the 1975 National League Championship Series, out-scoring their opponent 19–7 to sweep the series in three games. For his part, Foster batted .364 and scored three runs.

The Boston Red Sox proved a far tougher opponent in the World Series, as the Reds needed seven games to win their first World Series title since 1940. Foster went 2-for-6 and drove in two runs in the classic Game 6 of the World Series at Fenway Park. His most memorable moment was on the field. The game was tied, and with the bases loaded and no outs in the ninth inning, reigning MVP and Rookie of the Year Fred Lynn lifted a ball down the left field line. Foster made the catch near the stands for the first out of the inning. Denny Doyle tagged up on the play, and was out at home on a strong throw from Foster. Rico Petrocelli grounded out to Rose at third for the final out and sent the game to extra innings.

Anderson moved Foster into the clean-up spot in his batting order during a 17-game hitting streak in June 1976 when Foster's batting average peaked at .343. With 17 home runs and 71 RBI at the All-Star break, he was elected to start his first All-Star Game. He turned in an MVP performance with a two-run home run and third RBI to pace his team to a 7–1 victory over the American League All-Stars. He ended the season batting .306 with 29 home runs and a major league-leading 121 RBI in 144 games. After the season, Foster finished second, behind only teammate Joe Morgan, in National League MVP balloting. Rose and Griffey also finished within the top ten.

The Reds won the National League West by 10 games over the Los Angeles Dodgers. They became the only team to go undefeated in post-season history since the establishment of the Divisional Era in 1969 when they swept the Philadelphia Phillies in the 1976 National League Championship Series and New York Yankees in the World Series. For his part, Foster batted just .167 in the NLCS, but hit key home runs in Games 1 and 3. His average jumped to .429 in the World Series, while driving in four.

=== National League MVP ===
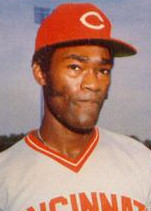
Foster, circa 1977

Foster turned in one of the all-time great seasons in 1977 on his way to winning the National League's Most Valuable Player Award. On July 14, Foster clubbed three home runs against the Atlanta Braves. A home run the following day off the Houston Astros' Gene Pentz brought his season mark to 29 heading into the All-Star break. He started his second consecutive All-Star game, and led the NL charge with a first inning double to drive in Dave Parker with the first run of the game. On September 23, in the ninth inning of the Reds' 5–1 victory over the Atlanta Braves, Foster hit his fiftieth home run of the season off Buzz Capra, making him the first player since Willie Mays in 1965 to hit fifty in a season. The 50 home run mark would not be reached again until Cecil Fielder hit 51 home runs in 1990. Foster was just the 10th player in major league history to reach the mark, and the first ever Cincinnati Reds player. In 158 games, he batted .320 with 52 home runs and 149 RBI, leading the majors in the latter two categories. He finished fourth in the NL in batting, missing the Triple Crown by .018 behind Dave Parker. He also led the NL in slugging percentage (.631), runs scored (124) and total bases (388).

Foster picked up where he left off in 1978, with 18 home runs and 63 RBI in the first half of the season to earn his third consecutive All-Star start. For the season, he played in 158 games and batted .281 while pacing the NL in both home runs and RBIs with 40 and 120, respectively. He was voted onto his fourth consecutive All-Star team in 1979, but needed to be pulled in the second inning after pulling his thigh. The Reds lost Foster for a month, and had been decimated by injuries, but managed to stay in the NL West race during Foster's absence. Shortly after his return, the Reds went on an eight-game winning streak that saw them jump into first place by 1.5 games over the Houston Astros. The Reds held off the Astros to win their first division crown since 1976, but were swept by the Pirates in the 1979 National League Championship Series. Foster's highlight was a game tying home run in Game 1 of the NLCS.

Following the 1979 season, Joe Morgan headed to the Houston Astros via free agency. With Tony Pérez and Pete Rose already gone, the "Big Red Machine" was beginning to come apart, and the Reds slumped to a third-place finish in 1980. Foster hit .273, and led the club with 25 home runs and 93 RBI in 144 games. A rejuvenated Reds team won a major league best 66 games in the strike shortened 1981 season, but managed to miss the playoffs as a result of the split-season format used that season. Foster returned to form, finishing second to Mike Schmidt in the NL's RBI race. At this point in his career, when it looked as if he would one day rank among the game's all-time greats, Lawrence Ritter and Donald Honig included him in their book The 100 Greatest Baseball Players of All Time.

== New York Mets ==
With one year remaining on his contract, Foster was seeking a new five-year deal with the Reds. Unwilling to meet his contract demands, the Reds traded him to the New York Mets for Greg Harris, Jim Kern and Alex Treviño on February 10, 1982. The next day, Foster agreed with the club on a five-year, $10 million contract.

Whereas the Reds were at or near the top of their division Foster's entire time in Cincinnati, the Mets were consistent cellar dwellers in the National League East when Foster joined his new club. The franchise was hoping for a turn around with Foster in tow, but it was not to be, as all of Foster's power numbers declined. He hit just .247 with 13 home runs and 70 RBI in 151 games, the lowest numbers he'd put up since 1974.

The Mets acquired Keith Hernandez and brought up rookie prospect Darryl Strawberry during the 1983 season. Given more protection in the line-up, Foster rebounded with a team-best 28 home runs and 90 RBI. When the Mets became a contending team in 1984, Foster batted .269 with 24 home runs and 86 RBI in 146 games.

The 1985 season came down to the wire between the Mets and St. Louis Cardinals. On September 10, with the two teams tied atop the NL East, an incident between Foster and Cardinals pitcher Danny Cox caused both benches to clear. The race remained tight, but the Cardinals pulled off a three-game lead as the Mets headed to Busch Stadium for a three-game set on October 1. The first game was a pitchers' duel between Ron Darling and John Tudor that the Mets won in extra innings. With the Mets now just two games back, 20-game winners Dwight Gooden and Joaquín Andújar faced off in the second game.

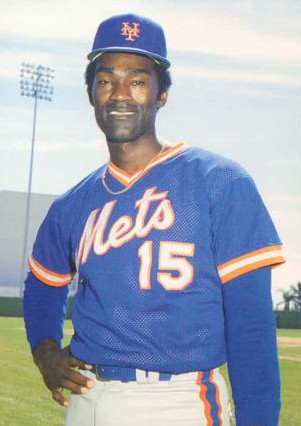
Foster in 1986

With the Mets leading 1–0, Foster led off the second inning by legging out an infield single. Three batters later, he scored the second run of the game on a fielder's choice by Gooden. In the seventh, he drove the first pitch from Andújar to deep center field to give the Mets a 4–1 lead. Foster went 3-for-4 to lead the Mets to a 5–2 victory, and pull to within one game of the division lead. The Mets would, however, lose the following day, and the Cardinals went on to win the division.

=== Last year in baseball ===
Foster was 37 years old and in the final year of his contract when the 1986 season began. Although he had been respectable for several years, he had not fully lived up to the expectations that were set for him by the Mets and his age was starting to become a factor as well. He put up respectable power numbers (13 home runs and 38 RBIs), but had a .237 batting average, and had lost considerable range in left field. Meanwhile, the Mets manager Davey Johnson was looking for an everyday position for utilityman Kevin Mitchell. When the Mets headed to Cincinnati for a three-game series on July 21, Foster sat out the series, making just one pinch hit appearance in the second game of the set.

This game was highlighted by a bench-clearing brawl that was ignited when the Reds' Eric Davis stole third base in the tenth inning. After a hard tag by Mets third baseman Ray Knight, the two men exchanged words, leading to Knight's punching Davis in the face. Both benches emptied with the exception of Foster. Foster said that he stayed out of the ruckus because it set a bad example for children. After the series in Cincinnati, the manager Johnson officially announced Mitchell as the everyday left fielder.

Despite Johnson's reasoning that Foster's lack of performance warranted the benching, Foster complained that his demotion was racially motivated, with Los Angeles Times writer Mike Downey criticizing him for making that statement considering that Mitchell, who replaced Foster, was black (like Foster). In addition, Met teammates Wally Backman and Mookie Wilson have since said that Foster's non-combative personality was a bad fit for the team. He made just 14 plate appearances after that point, walking once, getting one single, and striking out six times. On August 7, the Mets released Foster and replaced him on their major league roster with Lee Mazzilli.

On August 18, Foster signed a contract with the Chicago White Sox, and hit the ground running with his new club. In his first game, he went 2-for-4 with a home run. From there, his game declined, and Foster was released on September 7 after 15 games with his new club. When the Mets won the World Series in 1986, they awarded Foster a World Series ring (the third of his career) and a three-quarters share as a team member for part of the season. He attempted to sign with a new club in 1987, but was unsuccessful.

== Career statistics ==
In 1,977 games over 18 seasons, Foster compiled a .274 batting average (1,925-for-7,023) with 986 runs, 307 doubles, 47 triples, 348 home runs, 1,239 runs batted in (RBI), 666 walks, 1,419 strikeouts, a .338 on-base percentage and a .480 slugging percentage. He posted a .984 fielding percentage at all three outfield positions. In 23 post-season games (three appearances in the World Series, four appearances in the NLCS), he hit .289 (22-for-76) with 11 runs, two doubles, three home runs, 12 runs batted in and eight walks.

== Senior Professional Baseball Association ==
Afterwards, Foster played from 1989 to 1990 in the Senior Professional Baseball Association. In his first season, he hit .269 with 11 home runs and 52 RBI in 70 games for the St. Lucie Legends. In 1990, he joined the St. Petersburg Pelicans and batted .273 in three games for the club before the league folded during the midseason.

In February 2010, Foster was hired as a scout advisor for the Orix Buffaloes of Nippon Professional Baseball.

== Personal life ==
He married Sheila Roberts in 1977 and has two daughters, Shawna and Starr.

Foster began a baseball online radio show, "The George Foster Diamond Report", in which he speaks about how the development and strength of an athlete can build a strong foundation. Foster spends time instructing youth in baseball techniques, and also works as a motivational speaker. He operates a non-profit organization that supports children of military families and who live in inner city neighborhoods. He also sponsors baseball boot camps for children as well as a Cincinnati select baseball team, Foster's Force.

Foster was on the National Baseball Hall of Fame ballot for four years, having his highest total of 6.9% in 1993 before being dropped off after garnering 4.1% of the vote in 1995. He was inducted into the Cincinnati Reds Hall of Fame in 2003, He was a celebrity participant in the 2010 Cincinnati Reds/Findlay Market Opening Day Parade and he frequently returns to Cincinnati for the annual Redsfest and other reunion events. He was inducted into the Alabama Sports Hall of Fame in 2002.

== See also ==
- List of Major League Baseball career home run leaders
- List of Major League Baseball career runs batted in leaders
- List of Major League Baseball annual runs scored leaders
- San Francisco Giants all-time roster
- Cincinnati Reds all-time roster
- New York Mets all-time roster
- Chicago White Sox all-time roster
- 50 home run club

Awards and achievements
Preceded by Mike Schmidt; Al Oliver; Ken Reitz; Greg Luzinski; Dave Parker; Lou Brock	NL Player of the Month; May 1976; July 1976; June 1977; August 1977; April 1979; June 1979	Succeeded by Al Oliver; Joe Morgan; Greg Luzinski; César Cedeño; Lou Brock; Mike Schmidt
