= San Bernardino Pride =

- 1990; San Bernardino, California

Minor league affiliations
- Previous classes: Independent Winter League
- League: Senior Professional Baseball Association

The San Bernardino Pride was a baseball club who played in the Senior Professional Baseball Association in 1990 for the league's second season. They played its home games at Fiscalini Field in San Bernardino, California.

Former Baltimore Orioles infielder Rich Dauer was the playing manager of the Pride, while Tom Thompson served as the bench coach for the team. The best-known names on the roster were Vida Blue, the 1971 American League MVP and Cy Young Award winner, and Mike Norris, a 22-game winner for the 1980 Oakland Athletics. Other players included Derrel Thomas, who played for seven teams during a 15-year major league career, as well as the brothers Gary and Ron Roenicke.

The Pride also had its version of Bo Jackson in outfielder Anthony Davis, a two-sport star at the University of Southern California, where he earned three national championships in baseball and two in football, before playing as a running back in the WFL, the CFL, the NFL, and the USFL.

The Pride had a record of 13-12 and were in third place when the league canceled the season on December 26, 1990. An apparent rift between teams owners forced cancellation of all remaining games. At the time, the teams had not quite reached the halfway point in a planned 56-game schedule.

== Notable players ==
- Kim Allen
- Vida Blue
- Rich Dauer
- Anthony Davis
- Joe Decker
- Roger Erickson
- Bill Fleming
- Ed Glynn
- Rudy Law
- Mike Norris
- Bob Owchinko
- Jim Pankovits
- Leon Roberts
- Gary Roenicke
- Ron Roenicke
- Lenn Sakata
- Dave Skaggs
- Derrel Thomas
- John Urrea
- U L Washington
- Jim Willoughby
