= Winter Haven Super Sox =

- 1989; Winter Haven, Florida

Minor league affiliations
- Previous classes: Independent Winter League
- League: Senior Professional Baseball Association
- Division: Northern Division

Team data
- Previous parks: Chain of Lakes Park

The Winter Haven Super Sox were one of the eight original franchises that began play in the Senior Professional Baseball Association in 1989. The club, playing in the spring training site of the Boston Red Sox, featured numerous former Red Sox players, including future Hall of Famer Ferguson Jenkins as part of its pitching staff.

In the league's inaugural season, the Super Sox struggled and went through several managerial changes. Player/manager Bill Lee was replaced after just seven games by Ed Nottle, who was in turn replaced by Leon Roberts. Besides, Doug Griffin served as a coach and Dalton Jones played and coached. Among others, Cecil Cooper retired after just 16 games with the club.

The club finished in last place in the Northern Division and did not make the playoffs. Despite the team's poor performance, pitcher Bill Campbell led the league with a 2.12 ERA. After their first season, the Winter Haven Super Sox ceased operations.

== Notable players ==
- Matt Alexander
- Gary Allenson
- Jim Bibby
- Mark Bomback
- Pedro Borbón
- Bucky Brandon
- Al Bumbry
- Bill Campbell
- Bernie Carbo
- Cecil Cooper
- Mike Cuellar
- Ron Dunn
- Mario Guerrero
- Butch Hobson
- Ferguson Jenkins
- Dalton Jones
- Pete LaCock
- John LaRose
- Bill Lee
- Tom McMillan
- Ed Nottle
- Ben Oglivie
- Joe Pittman
- Gene Richards
- Leon Roberts
- Tony Scott
- Scipio Spinks
- Jim Willoughby
- Rick Wise
