= Mark Corey (outfielder) =

American baseball player (born 1955)

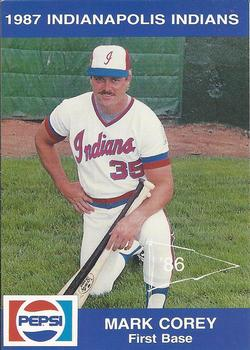
- Outfielder
- Born: November 3, 1955 (age 70); Tucumcari, New Mexico, U.S.
- Batted: Right Threw: Right

MLB debut
- September 1, 1979, for the Baltimore Orioles

Last MLB appearance
- October 3, 1981, for the Baltimore Orioles

MLB statistics
- Batting average: .211
- Home runs: 1
- Runs batted in: 3
- Stats at Baseball Reference

Teams
- Baltimore Orioles (1979 – 1981); Kintetsu Buffaloes (1984)

Mark Mundell Corey (born November 3, 1955) is an American former professional baseball player. Born in Tucumcari, New Mexico, he was an outfielder who appeared in 59 Major League games for the Baltimore Orioles (1979–1981). He threw and batted right-handed, stood 6 feet 2 inches (1.88 m) tall and weighed 200 pounds (91 kg).

== Batted .400 in pro baseball debut ==
Corey was Baltimore's second pick in the January 1976 Major League Baseball draft out of Central Arizona College. In his first professional season, Corey dominated the short-season Rookie-level Appalachian League, winning the Triple Crown by batting .400, hitting 17 home runs and driving in 59 runs in only 70 games. He also led the league in hits (114) and runs scored (62), was selected the Appalachian League's 1976 Most Valuable Player, and led the Bluefield Orioles to the North Division's best record.

The performance bumped Corey all the way up to the Double-A Southern League for 1977. There, Corey again led the league in batting average (.310) and hits (152), and was just two home runs and ten RBIs short of leading the Southern loop in those categories as well. He was selected as a member of the league's All-Star team.

== Knee woes ruined MLB prospects ==
Hampered by a knee injury, Corey played in only 74 games in 1978 for the Triple-A Rochester Red Wings, but he batted .324 and was primed to take over a spot on the Orioles' American League roster for 1979, but his ongoing knee miseries and a poor performance in spring training earned him a return ticket to Rochester. Although he struggled at the plate and batted only .249, he was recalled by the Orioles in September, where he collected only two singles in 13 at bats.

In 1980, Corey again split the year between Baltimore and Rochester. He struggled even more with the Red Wings, with his batting average falling to .230, but in his midseason trial with the Orioles, Corey hit his only Major League home run, a two-run shot on July 14 off Paul Splittorff of the Kansas City Royals. In 36 games for Baltimore that season, Corey registered ten of his 12 big-league hits and batted .278. But 1981 saw him spend much of the campaign in Triple-A, and then go hitless in ten at bats in his final Orioles audition that September.

== Played in Japan and the senior league ==
Corey then bounced around among several Major League organizations, played one season in Nippon Professional Baseball with the 1984 Kintetsu Buffaloes (where he hit three homers in 31 games, but batted only .215), and sat out the 1985 season while nursing his injured knee. He retired after the 1987 minor league season. Although he played for the Orlando Juice of the Senior Professional Baseball Association in 1989.

In the Majors, Corey had 12 hits in 57 at bats, with two doubles, one home run, and seven bases on balls. In the minors, he hit .294 overall with 118 homers and 893 hits.
