= Chain of Lakes Park =

Baseball field in Winter Haven, Florida, US

Coordinates: 28°0′2″N 81°43′39″W

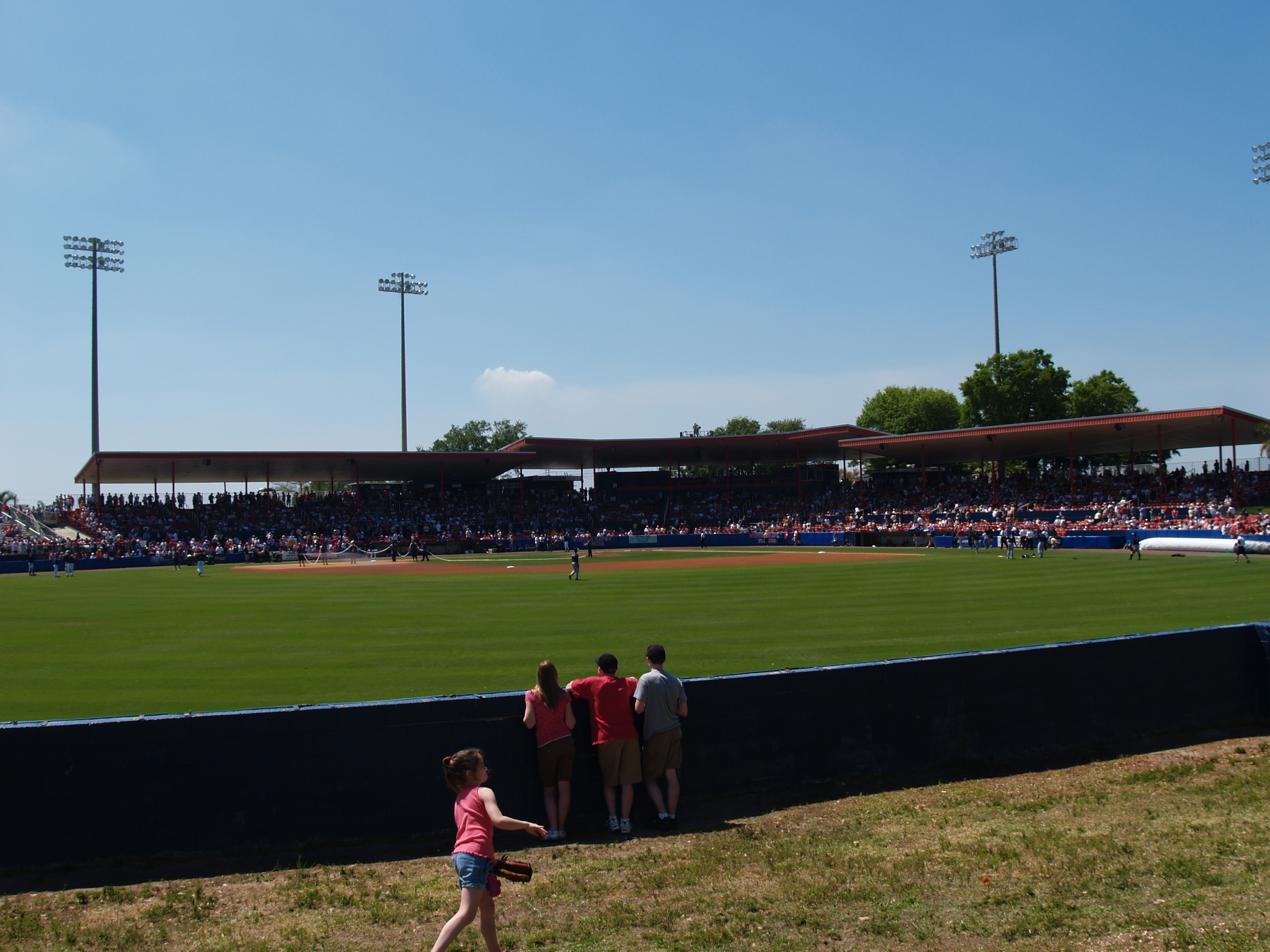

- Location within Florida Location within the United States
- Interactive map of Chain of Lakes Park
- Address: 500 Cletus Allen Dr; Winter Haven, Florida 33880
- Capacity: 7,000
- Surface: Grass
- Field size: Left Field – 340 ft (103.6 m); Center Field – 425 ft (129.5 m); Right Field – 340 ft (103.6 m)

Construction
- Opened: 1966 (renovated 1993)
- Demolished: 2024
- Cost: $425,000

Tenants
- Boston Red Sox (spring training) (1966–1992); Winter Haven Sun Sox (FSL) (1966); Winter Haven Mets (FSL) (1967); Winter Haven Red Sox (FSL) (1969–1992); Winter Haven Super Sox (SPBA) (1989); Cleveland Indians (spring training) (1993–2008); GCL Indians (GCL) (1993–2008)

Chain of Lakes Park was a baseball field in Winter Haven, Florida. The stadium was built in 1966 and held 7,000 people. It was the spring training home of the Boston Red Sox from 1966 to 1992, after which the Red Sox moved operations to City of Palms Park in Fort Myers.

In 1993, the Cleveland Indians moved into Chain of Lakes Park after their own stadium in Homestead was destroyed by Hurricane Andrew. The stadium served as Cleveland's spring training home until their last game on March 27, 2008. Cleveland moved their spring training operations to Goodyear Ballpark in Goodyear, Arizona, in 2009.

The future of the ballpark and facility was long in doubt as its location on Lake Lulu became valuable for commercial and residential development. In 2011, developers proposed a multipurpose redevelopment of the site, including hotels, restaurants, shops, and a movie theater. In December 2020, Winter Haven and Polk County agreed to demolish the stadium and replace it with baseball diamonds and general-purpose athletic fields. Demolition began in April 2024.
