= Fernando González (baseball) =

Puerto Rican baseball player (born 1950)

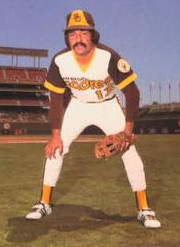
- González in 1978
- Second baseman
- Born: June 19, 1950 (age 76); Utuado, Puerto Rico
- Batted: Right Threw: Right

MLB debut
- September 15, 1972, for the Pittsburgh Pirates

Last MLB appearance
- September 23, 1979, for the San Diego Padres

MLB statistics
- Batting average: .235
- Home runs: 17
- Runs batted in: 104
- Stats at Baseball Reference

Teams
- Pittsburgh Pirates (1972–1973); Kansas City Royals (1974); New York Yankees (1974); Pittsburgh Pirates (1977–1978); San Diego Padres (1978–1979)

José Fernando González Quinones (born June 19, 1950) is a Puerto Rican former Major League Baseball (MLB) infielder. After the end of his major league career, he spent one season with the St. Lucie Legends of the Senior Professional Baseball Association. He batted and threw right-handed.

== Career ==
González originally signed with the short-lived Seattle Pilots as an amateur free agent in 1968, and remained part of the franchise through its move to Milwaukee. He played his first professional season (in American baseball) with their Class A Clinton Pilots in 1969. He was released by the Milwaukee Brewers at the start of the 1970 season, and sat it out before catching on with the Pittsburgh Pirates for 1971. He batted .321 with nineteen home runs over two seasons in their farm system, and led the Eastern League in doubles (43) and total bases (256) in 1972 to earn a call up to the majors that September. He had two pinch hit at-bats, and struck out both times. Though they weren't teammates very long, González was part of several search parties that went looking for Roberto Clemente's body after Clemente's plane crashed on New Year's Eve, 1972, as he'd grown up idolizing Clemente.

He split the 1973 season between the Pirates and triple A Charleston Charlies, batting .224 with five runs batted in at the major league level and hitting his first major league home run on May 27 off the Houston Astros' Dave Roberts. After the season, he and pitcher Nelson Briles were traded to the Kansas City Royals for Kurt Bevacqua, Ed Kirkpatrick and minor leaguer Winston Cole.

He appeared in just nine games for the Royals when he was optioned to triple A Omaha on May 3 to make room for George Brett on the major league roster. Two days later, his contract was sold to the New York Yankees. In his only season in New York City, González batted .215 backing up Sandy Alomar Sr. at second base. He failed to make the club out of Spring training the following year, and was released. He caught on with the Petroleros Poza Rica of the Mexican League before signing a minor league deal with the Pirates on July 17, 1975.

González led the International League with 31 doubles in 1976, and batted .310 in a little over a season as a minor leaguer before returning to the Pirates in 1977. He spent the entire season in the majors, batting a career high .276 with four home runs and 27 RBIs. He got most of his playing time at third base, but he also played some outfield and second as well. As a pinch hitter, he was 10-for-27 with nine RBIs.

González started off slowly in 1978, and was placed on waivers by the Pirates with a .190 batting average at the start of June. He was selected by the San Diego Padres June 5, and took over as the club's starting second baseman.

His fortunes turned around pretty immediately with his new club. González had a two home run game against the Chicago Cubs on July 14 (his only two of the season and the fifth & sixth of his career), and completely tore up his old club when the Pirates came to San Diego for a three-game set later in the month (four-for-ten with four RBIs to help his team sweep the series). He batted .250 for the Padres in 1978. Coupled with Ozzie Smith at shortstop, he also provided his club with one of the steadier defenses up the middle in the National League (.982 fielding percentage).

His final season in the majors was arguably his best. Though he batted just .217 in 1979, he more than doubled his career home run total with nine, and had a career high 34 RBIs. Regardless, the Padres acquired former All-Star second baseman Dave Cash from the Montreal Expos during the off-season, and released González. He signed a minor league deal with the California Angels in 1980, but never returned to the majors. During the 1981 season, he returned to Mexico, and competed in the Mexican league until 1984, when he returned to the Yankees organization as a member of the Southern League's Nashville Sounds as a player/coach. He joined the St. Lucie Legends of the Senior Professional Baseball Association in 1989.

== See also ==
- List of Major League Baseball players from Puerto Rico
