= Tito Landrum =

American baseball player (born 1954)

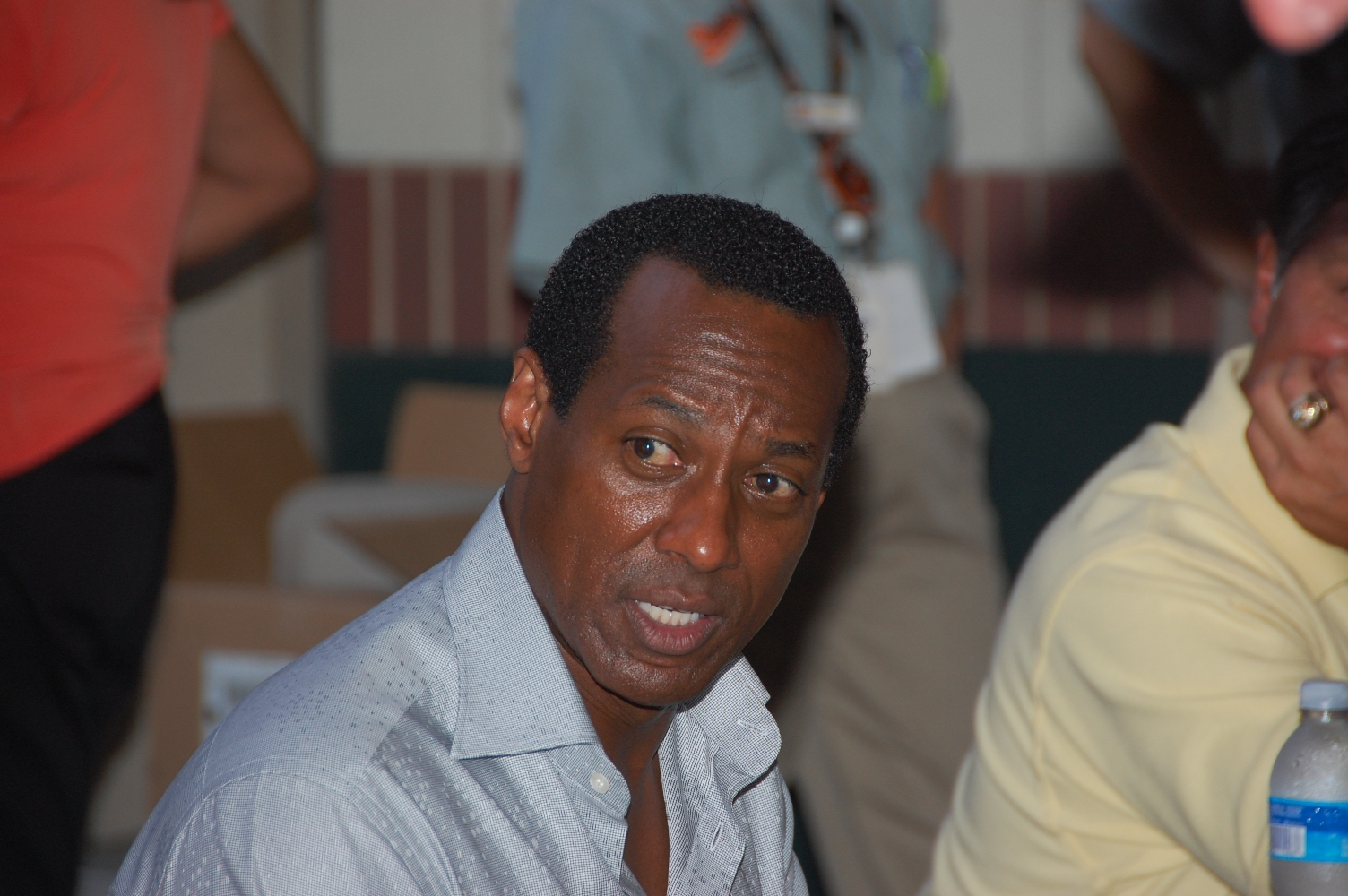
- Landrum at 25th Anniversary of Orioles' 1983 World Series Championship
- Outfielder
- Born: October 25, 1954 (age 71); Joplin, Missouri, U.S.
- Batted: Right Threw: Right

MLB debut
- July 24, 1980, for the St. Louis Cardinals

Last MLB appearance
- May 9, 1988, for the Baltimore Orioles

MLB statistics
- Batting average: .249
- Home runs: 13
- Runs batted in: 111
- Stats at Baseball Reference

Teams
- St. Louis Cardinals (1980–1983); Baltimore Orioles (1983); St. Louis Cardinals (1984–1987); Los Angeles Dodgers (1987); Baltimore Orioles (1988)

Career highlights and awards
- World Series champion (1983)

Terry Lee Landrum (born October 25, 1954) is an American former professional baseball outfielder who played in Major League Baseball (MLB) from 1980 to 1988.

== Biography ==
Landrum was born in Joplin, Missouri. He graduated from Highland High School in Albuquerque, New Mexico.

Landrum was acquired by the Baltimore Orioles on August 31, 1983, the last day for player postseason eligibility. This was the completion of a transaction from 2 1/2 months prior when the Orioles sent Floyd Rayford to the St. Louis Cardinals on June 13. Landrum hit the game-winning home run for the Orioles in Game 4 of the 1983 American League Championship Series. He was a very late addition to the Orioles post-season roster, and such an unlikely hero that teammate John Lowenstein joked that he was not sure of Landrum's first name.

Landrum also played well in the 1985 National League Championship Series and 1985 World Series for the St. Louis Cardinals, subbing for an injured Vince Coleman. He hit well over .300 in the postseason and had a home run in game four of the World Series. Landrum played winter ball with the Cardenales de Lara club of the Venezuelan League during three seasons spanning 1981–1983.

Although a below average hitter in his career, in 607 games compiling a .249 batting average with 13 home runs and 111 RBI over 9 seasons, Landrum was an excellent outfielder. In 2330 2/3 innings, (including one game at first base) he recorded a .992 fielding percentage, committing only 5 errors in 634 total chances. He was a strong hitter in the postseason, compiling a .347 batting average (17-for-49) with 7 runs, 2 home runs and 6 RBI in 19 games.

Landrum also played for the West Palm Beach Tropics and the St. Petersburg Pelicans of the Senior Professional Baseball Association in the 1989 and 1990 seasons, respectively. He played in the Mexican League with the Charros de Jalisco, in 1991.

After baseball, Landrum attended New York University and earned a physical therapy degree. In 1998, he became a physical therapist, with a practice in New York City. He was NYU Baseball's hitting coach.
