= Steve Luebber =

American baseball player (born 1949)

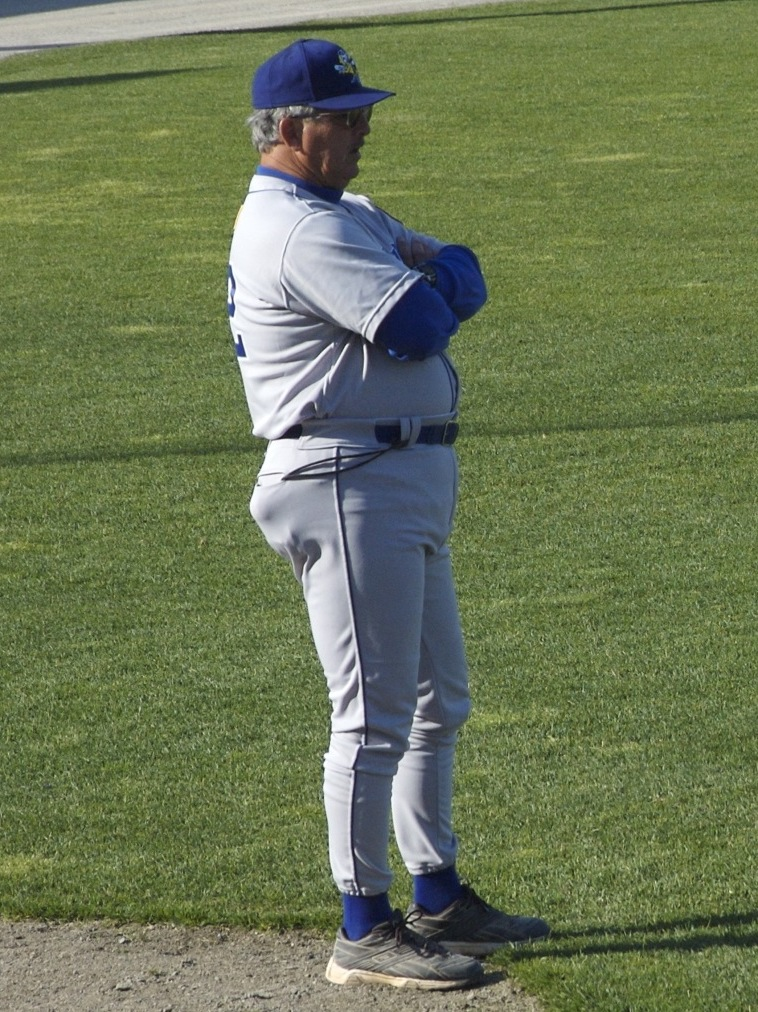
- Luebber with the Burlington Bees in 2006
- Pitcher
- Born: July 9, 1949 (age 77); Clinton, Missouri, U.S.
- Batted: Right Threw: Right

MLB debut
- June 27, 1971, for the Minnesota Twins

Last MLB appearance
- September 29, 1981, for the Baltimore Orioles

MLB statistics
- Win–loss record: 6–10
- Earned run average: 4.62
- Strikeouts: 93
- Stats at Baseball Reference

Teams
- Minnesota Twins (1971–1972, 1976); Toronto Blue Jays (1979); Baltimore Orioles (1981)

Stephen Lee Luebber (/ˈluːbər/ LOO-bər; born July 9, 1949) is an American former Major League Baseball pitcher. Luebber pitched in all or part of five seasons in the majors between 1971 and 1981. He currently serves as pitching coach for the Quad Cities River Bandits, high-A farm team for the Kansas City Royals.

== Career ==
Luebber was drafted by the Minnesota Twins in the 13th round of the 1967 Major League Baseball draft. After four-and-a-half years in the minors, he made his major league debut for the Twins in 1971, pitching in 18 games and starting 12, going 2–5 with a 5.03 ERA. He was returned to the minors in 1972, appearing in two games for the Twins in September.

Luebber spent the next three seasons in the minor leagues before finally returning to the major leagues in 1976. That season, he set career bests in every major category, going 4–5 with an ERA at 4.00. After another season in the minors, the Twins released Luebber in October 1977.

After spending 1978 in the Chicago White Sox organization, Luebber returned to the majors in 1979 with the Toronto Blue Jays. He pitched in one game for them that September, pitching to three batters in a game against the Boston Red Sox without retiring a batter. The Blue Jays released him the following spring, and he was signed to a minor league contract by the Baltimore Orioles. In 1981 he was called up to the majors one last time, pitching in seven games with a 7.56 ERA.

Luebber continued to pitch in the minor leagues for several more seasons. He pitched in the Rangers, Tigers and Padres organizations through 1983. He then returned to the San Diego Padres farm system between 1986 and 1988, making a number of appearances at the double-A level. In 1989 he moved on to the Senior Professional Baseball Association, where he pitched two seasons for the Fort Myers Sun Sox. He finally retired after the 1990 season at age 40. In all, Luebber spent 22 seasons (over a 24-year period) playing professional baseball.

After his playing career, Luebber moved into the coaching ranks. He has coached in the Padres, Orioles, Texas Rangers, Florida Marlins and most recently the Royals' organization. In 2006, he was the pitching coach for the Burlington Bees. In 2007, he moved into the same position with the Wilmington Blue Rocks until 2016, when Luebber advanced to the AA Northwest Arkansas Naturals pitching coach position. In 2021, he became pitching coach of the Quad Cities River Bandits, also in the Royals' farm system.
