= Fort Myers Sun Sox =

- 1989–1990; Fort Myers, Florida

Minor league affiliations
- Previous classes: Independent Winter League
- League: Senior Professional Baseball Association
- Division: Southern Division

Team data
- Previous parks: Terry Park

The Fort Myers Sun Sox were one of the eight original franchises that began play in the Senior Professional Baseball Association in 1989. The club was managed by Pat Dobson, while Joe Coleman, Dyar Miller, Jerry Terrell and Tony Torchia served as coaches. The Sun Sox played their home games at Terry Park in Fort Myers.

The Sun Sox finished their inaugural season in second place in the Southern Division with a 37–35 record. Their offense was led by the league's top hitter, Tim Ireland, who posted a .374 batting average, while Kim Allen topped the circuit with 33 stolen bases and Amos Otis belted 11 home runs. The Sun Sox were eliminated by the Bradenton Explorers in the playoffs.

The following season, ownership squabbles in Fort Myers caused the Sun Sox to fold and the league to cease operations less than halfway through its second season.

The statistics for all teams that played the 1989–90 season were published in the Sporting News on February 12, 1990, pages 30–31 "Assessing the Boys of Winter".

== Notable players ==
- Kim Allen
- Bud Anderson
- Alan Ashby
- Doug Bird
- Manny Castillo
- Marty Castillo
- Dave Collins
- Don Cooper
- Dick Drago
- Dan Driessen
- Pepe Frías
- Marv Foley
- Rich Gale
- Wayne Garland
- Larry Harlow
- Tim Hosley
- Don Hood
- Tim Ireland
- Ron Jackson
- Bobby Jones
- Odell Jones
- Ken Kravec
- Rafael Landestoy
- Dave LaRoche
- Johnnie LeMaster
- Dennis Leonard
- Steve Luebber
- Rick Manning
- Jerry Martin
- Steve McCatty
- Eddie Milner
- Bob Molinaro
- Amos Otis
- Pat Putnam
- Ron Pruitt
- Mike Ramsey
- Eric Rasmussen
- Dan Rohn
- Gilberto Rondón
- Roger Slagle
- Jim Slaton
- Tom Spencer
- Champ Summers
- Jerry Terrell
- Rick Waits
- Jerry White
