= Odell Jones =

American baseball player (1953–2024)

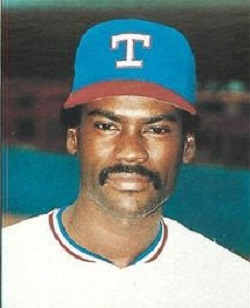
- Jones in 1983
- Pitcher
- Born: January 13, 1953; Tulare, California, U.S.
- Died: March 20, 2024 (aged 71); Beaverton, Oregon, U.S.
- Batted: Right Threw: Right

MLB debut
- September 11, 1975, for the Pittsburgh Pirates

Last MLB appearance
- September 23, 1988, for the Milwaukee Brewers

MLB statistics
- Win–loss record: 24–35
- Earned run average: 4.42
- Strikeouts: 338
- Stats at Baseball Reference

Teams
- Pittsburgh Pirates (1975, 1977–1978); Seattle Mariners (1979); Pittsburgh Pirates (1981); Texas Rangers (1983–1984); Baltimore Orioles (1986); Milwaukee Brewers (1988)

Odell Jones (January 13, 1953 – March 20, 2024) was an American pitcher in Major League Baseball who played for the Pittsburgh Pirates, Seattle Mariners, Texas Rangers, Baltimore Orioles and Milwaukee Brewers, in parts of nine seasons spanning 1975–1988. Listed at 6 feet 3 inches (1.91 m), 175 pounds (79 kg), he batted and threw right handed.

== Career ==
=== Journeyman career ===
Overall, Jones' professional baseball career spanned 21 seasons. He was originally signed by the Pirates in 1971, although he did not make his professional debut until the following season with the Niagara Falls Pirates. He made his major league debut for the 1975 NL East division-winning Pirates, appearing in two September games. He was traded along with Mario Mendoza and Rafael Vásquez from the Pirates to the Mariners for Enrique Romo, Tom McMillan and Rick Jones at the Winter Meetings on December 5, 1978. The Pirates then traded for him a year later. After that, he drifted through several organizations, never going more than two seasons without spending time in the minor leagues.

=== Saves Leader ===
Jones led the third place 1983 Texas Rangers in saves with 10.

=== An unlikely near no-hitter ===
One of Jones' most memorable games came on May 28, 1988, with the Milwaukee Brewers. Jones, who had not started a major league game since 1981, started against the Cleveland Indians in place of the injured Teddy Higuera. In Higuera's previous start, he had lasted just one inning, and Jones pitched five innings in relief, giving up just two hits and one run. Surprisingly, Jones came within two outs of a no-hitter before giving up a single to Ron Washington and being pulled for closer Dan Plesac.

The game, which took place in Cleveland Municipal Stadium, was the best of his career. Jones, who had been pitching in the minor leagues with the Syracuse Chiefs the previous year, never pitched a complete-game shutout, and in fact never gave up fewer than five hits in any of his four career complete games. "I kind of looked up at the board tonight and thought, 'What am I doing? What in the world am I doing?' This is by far my best game ever," Jones told reporters after the game. "After about the fifth or sixth inning, I was really bearing down, trying to get it. After the hit, it really hit me hard, I was totally exhausted. I was overextending myself, using everything I had to get the ball up there. I was too tired to get nervous."

In his next start, Jones lasted just 4 2/3 innings, giving up four runs and five hits. He never made another major league start after that, and in 1989 he returned to the minor leagues with the Brewers' top farm club, the Denver Bears. That winter, Jones joined the Senior Professional Baseball Association, where he pitched for the West Palm Beach Tropics and Fort Myers Sun Sox during that league's two seasons. After spending 1991 out of organized baseball, Jones tried one last comeback in 1992 with the Edmonton Trappers, pitching in five games, while ending his career in the Mexican League at the end of the year.

=== Career overview ===
In nine major league seasons, Jones had a 24–35 win–loss record, with a 4.42 ERA. He appeared in 201 games, with 549⅓ innings pitched. He started 45 games, in which he had four complete games. As a reliever, he finished 91 games, including 13 saves.

== Sources ==
- Career statistics from MLB · Baseball Reference · Baseball Reference (Minors) · Retrosheet · Baseball Almanac, or Retrosheet, or Venezuelan Winter League
