= John LaRose =

American baseball player (1951–2021)

- Pitcher
- Born: October 25, 1951; Pawtucket, Rhode Island, U.S.
- Died: January 14, 2021 (aged 69); Cumberland, Rhode Island, U.S.
- Batted: Left Threw: Left

MLB debut
- September 20, 1978, for the Boston Red Sox

Last MLB appearance
- September 20, 1978, for the Boston Red Sox

MLB statistics
- Win–loss record: 0–0
- Earned run average: 22.50
- Strikeouts: 0
- Stats at Baseball Reference

Teams
- Boston Red Sox (1978)

Henry John LaRose (October 25, 1951 – January 14, 2021) was an American pitcher in Major League Baseball who played briefly for the Boston Red Sox during the 1978 season. Listed at 6'1", and 185 lb., he batted and threw left-handed.

On September 20, 1978, LaRose made a relief appearance against Detroit at Tiger Stadium. He allowed five runs (22.0 ERA), giving three hit and five walks without strikeouts over 2.0 innings of work. He did not have a decision and never appeared in a major league game again.

LaRose also played for the 1989 Winter Haven Super Sox of the Senior Professional Baseball Association.

He died from COVID-19 on January 14, 2021, during the COVID-19 pandemic in Rhode Island.

== See also ==
- Cup of coffee
