= Tim Hosley =

American baseball player (1947–2014)

- Catcher
- Born: May 10, 1947; Spartanburg, South Carolina, U.S.
- Died: January 21, 2014 (aged 66); Moore, South Carolina, U.S.
- Batted: Right Threw: Right

MLB debut
- September 8, 1970, for the Detroit Tigers

Last MLB appearance
- June 10, 1981, for the Oakland Athletics

MLB statistics
- Batting average: .215
- Home runs: 12
- Runs batted in: 53
- Stats at Baseball Reference

Teams
- Detroit Tigers (1970–1971); Oakland Athletics (1973–1974); Chicago Cubs (1975–1976); Oakland Athletics (1976–1978, 1981)

Timothy Kenneth Hosley (/ˈhoʊzliː/ HOHZ-lee; May 10, 1947 – January 21, 2014) was an American professional baseball catcher who played parts of nine seasons in Major League Baseball between 1970 and 1981. He played for the 1973 and 1974 World Series champion Oakland Athletics, though he was never on a postseason roster.

== Career ==
Hosley was originally signed by the Detroit Tigers in 1966, and made it to the majors with them for the first time in 1970. He played in just 14 games for them over two seasons before being sold to the A's before the 1973 season. Again, though, Hosley's major league time was minimal, playing in 24 games over two seasons during the A's 1973 and '74 World Championship seasons. The A's were deep in catching during those seasons, often playing Gene Tenace at first base.

Hosley was removed from the A's major league roster and selected by the Chicago Cubs in the Rule 5 Draft on December 2, 1974. This led to Hosley's best showing in the majors in 1975, when he batted .255 with 6 home runs in 62 games while splitting time behind the plate with Steve Swisher and George Mitterwald. Despite these hitting numbers, which were good for a catcher at the time, he was placed on waivers by the Cubs just a few games into the 1976 season, and he was claimed by Oakland.

His return to the A's was somewhat more successful than his first stay from the standpoint of playing time, but his batting numbers declined sharply, as he only hit a .199 batting average over 79 games between 1976 and 1978. He remained in the A's farm system until 1981, when he was released on August 27 after one final stint at the major league level, during which he went just 2-for-21.

In 1989, Tim Hosley played one more professional season for the Fort Myers Sun Sox of the Senior Professional Baseball Association.
