= Elías Sosa =

Dominican baseball player (born 1950)

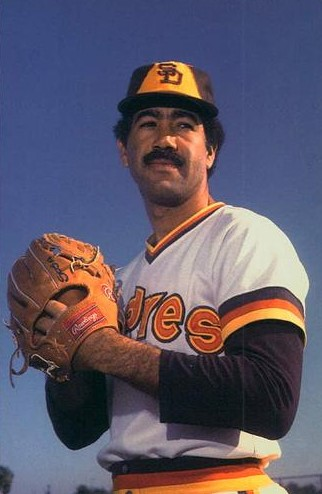
- Pitcher
- Born: June 10, 1950 (age 75); La Vega, Dominican Republic
- Batted: Right Threw: Right

MLB debut
- September 8, 1972, for the San Francisco Giants

Last MLB appearance
- September 18, 1983, for the San Diego Padres

MLB statistics
- Win–loss record: 59–51
- Earned run average: 3.32
- Strikeouts: 538
- Saves: 83
- Stats at Baseball Reference

Teams
- San Francisco Giants (1972–1974); St. Louis Cardinals (1975); Atlanta Braves (1975–1976); Los Angeles Dodgers (1976–1977); Oakland Athletics (1978); Montreal Expos (1979–1981); Detroit Tigers (1982); San Diego Padres (1983)

Elías Sosa Martínez (born June 10, 1950) is a Dominican former professional baseball pitcher. He was signed by the San Francisco Giants of Major League Baseball (MLB) as an amateur free agent on March 4, 1968, and played for the Giants (1972–1974), St. Louis Cardinals (1975), Atlanta Braves (1975–1976), Los Angeles Dodgers (1976–1977), Oakland Athletics (1978), Montreal Expos (1979–1981), Detroit Tigers (1982), and San Diego Padres (1983).

Sosa was used almost exclusively in relief during his 12-year MLB career. He appeared in 601 games, just three as a starter, and performed as both a closer and a long reliever. He twice had an earned run average (ERA) below 2.00 (1977 and 1979), and in his rookie year, 1973, he won 10 games, saved 18, and pitched in 71 games, all of which would become career highs.

In 1973, he saved nine of teammate Ron Bryant's major league-leading 24 wins, including #20.

He finished in the top ten American League or National League pitchers four times for games pitched and games finished, three times for saves, and once for winning percentage.

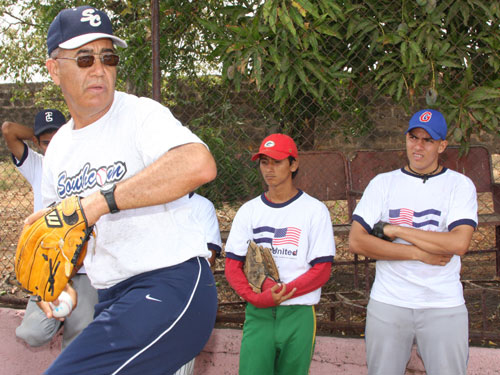
Sosa at a pitching clinic in Nicaragua in 2008

Other career highlights include:

- 3 scoreless innings to earn a save against the Philadelphia Phillies (June 2, 1973)
- won games on two consecutive days vs. the Atlanta Braves, pitching a combined 4 scoreless innings with 4 strikeouts, no walks, and giving up just one hit (September 1 and 2, 1973)
- 4 scoreless innings to earn a save against the Cincinnati Reds (July 26, 1974)
- 4 innings, allowing just one run (unearned), to earn a save against the San Francisco Giants (May 23, 1976)
- 4.1 scoreless innings, with a career-high 6 strikeouts, for a no decision vs. the San Diego Padres (July 10, 1977)
- 3 perfect innings to earn a save against the Toronto Blue Jays (May 2, 1978)
- 4 scoreless innings, allowing just one hit, to earn a save against the San Diego Padres (July 15, 1979)

Sosa allowed just 64 career home runs, or one for every 14.1 innings pitched. He gave up the second home run of three hit by Reggie Jackson of the New York Yankees in Game 6 of the 1977 World Series. For his career, he finished with 59 wins, 51 losses, 83 saves, 330 games finished, and an ERA of 3.32.

In 1989 he played for the St. Petersburg Pelicans of the Senior Professional Baseball Association.

== See also ==
- List of Major League Baseball leaders in games finished
