= Bradenton Explorers =

- 1989–1990; Bradenton, Florida

Minor league affiliations
- Previous classes: Independent Winter League
- League: Senior Professional Baseball Association
- Division: Northern Division

Team data
- Previous names: Daytona Beach Explorers (1990); Bradenton Explorers (1989)
- Previous parks: Jackie Robinson Ballpark (1990); McKechnie Field (1989)

The Bradenton Explorers were one of the eight original franchises that began play in the Senior Professional Baseball Association in 1989.

That season, the club compiled a record of 38-34, finishing in second place in the league's Northern Division, narrowly holding off the Orlando Juice. Jim Morrison led the league with 17 home runs, and pitcher Rick Lysander added a league-high 11 saves. In the playoffs, the Explorers lost to the St. Petersburg Pelicans, who went on to become league champions.

However the following season, the team was relocated to Daytona Beach, becoming the Daytona Beach Explorers. The move was a result of the team losing $1 million during their first season.

In Daytona the team had an 11-11 record and were in 4th place when the Senior Professional Baseball Association ceased operations on December 28, 1990.

== Notable players ==
- Willie Aikens
- Gary Alexander
- Dan Boone
- Tom Brown
- Doug Capilla
- Stan Cliburn
- Gene Clines
- Al Cowens
- John D'Acquisto
- Steve Dillard
- Chuck Dobson
- Dave Freisleben
- Wayne Garrett
- Garth Iorg
- Pat Kelly
- Bruce Kison
- Ken Kravec
- Wayne Krenchicki
- Ron LeFlore
- Rick Lysander
- Mickey Mahler
- Tippy Martinez
- Hal McRae
- Danny Meyer
- Tommy Moore
- Omar Moreno
- Jim Morrison
- Graig Nettles
- Jim Nettles
- Wayne Nordhagen
- Al Oliver
- Rick Peterson
- Jerry Royster
- Manny Sanguillén
- Earl Stephenson
- Sammy Stewart
