= Eric Rasmussen (baseball) =

American baseball player (born 1952)

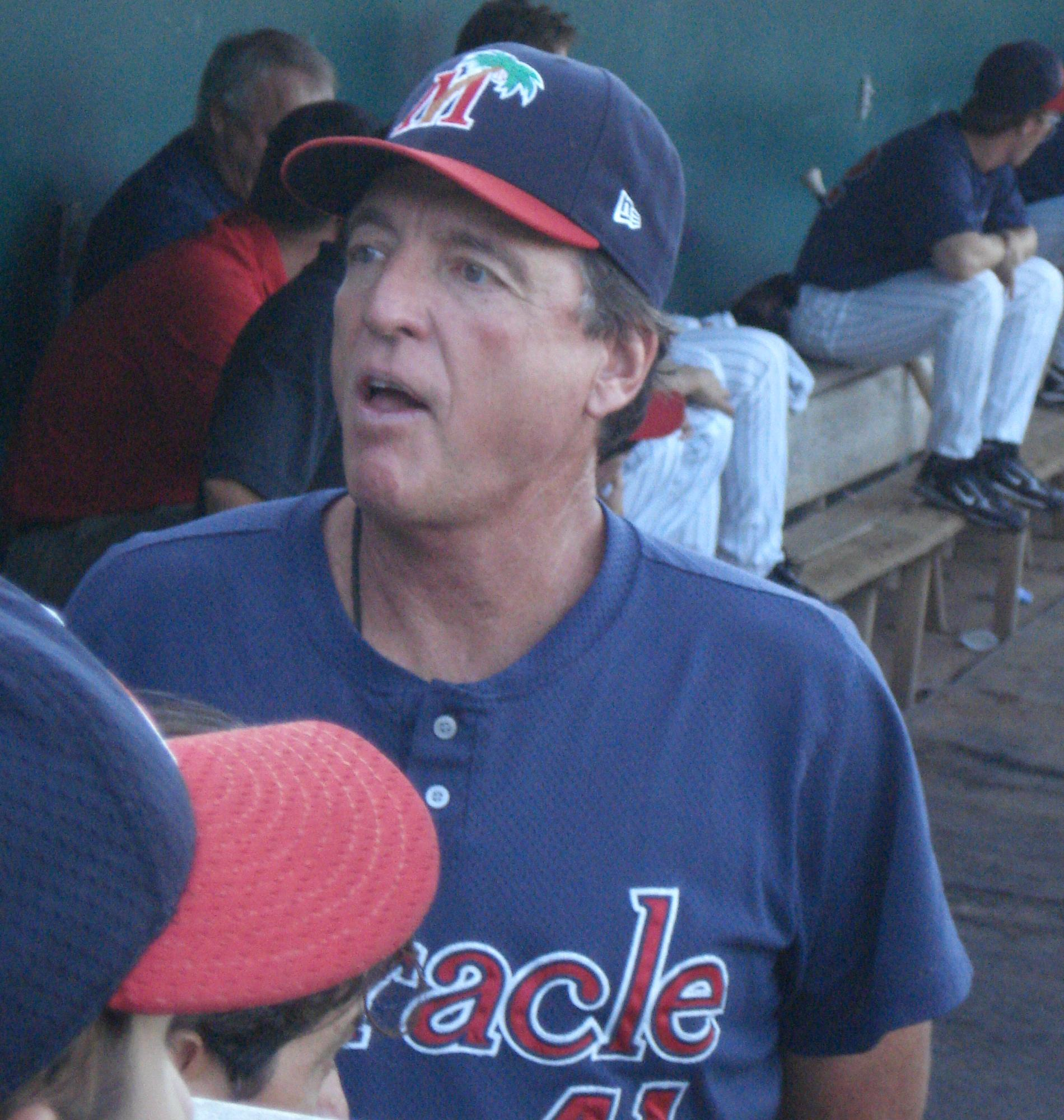
- Pitcher
- Born: March 22, 1952 (age 74); Racine, Wisconsin, U.S.
- Batted: Right Threw: Right

MLB debut
- July 21, 1975, for the St. Louis Cardinals

Last MLB appearance
- October 2, 1983, for the Kansas City Royals

MLB statistics
- Win–loss record: 50–77
- Earned run average: 3.85
- Strikeouts: 489
- Stats at Baseball Reference

Teams
- St. Louis Cardinals (1975–1978); San Diego Padres (1978–1980); St. Louis Cardinals (1982–1983); Kansas City Royals (1983)

Eric Ralph Rasmussen (born March 22, 1952) is an American former professional baseball pitcher, and current coach in the Minnesota Twins organization.

== Career ==
=== Early years ===
Born Harold Ralph Rasmussen, he was originally known as Harry until legally changing his name to Eric during the 1976–1977 offseason. The right hander was originally selected by the Boston Red Sox in the fourth round of the January 1971 Major League Baseball draft, but opted instead to attend the University of New Orleans, where he was named first team All-America. The St. Louis Cardinals then selected him in the 32nd round of the 1973 Major League Baseball draft. He was the last player selected and signed in his draft year to play in the Major Leagues.

=== St. Louis Cardinals ===
Rasmussen moved through the Cardinals' organization rapidly, reaching Triple-A with the Tulsa Oilers in just his second full season in 1975. He was called up to the majors that July, and hurled a seven hit shutout (7 strikeouts, 1 walk) of the San Diego Padres in his major league debut. He also collected his first major league hit and drove in the second run of the game with a fifth inning single. He wound up starting 13 games for the Cardinals over the rest of the season, going 5–5 with a 3.78 earned run average.

After splitting 1976 between the bullpen and starting rotation, Rasmussen had perhaps his best season statistically in 1977. He set career bests in ERA (3.48), strikeouts (120), innings pitched (233) and complete games (11). Despite his good numbers, Rasmussen lost 17 games against 11 wins for the third-place Cards.

=== San Diego Padres ===
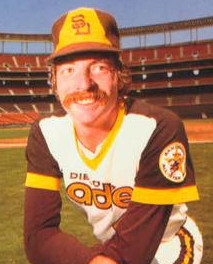
Rasmussen in 1978

Rasmussen started 1978 with St. Louis, but was traded to the San Diego Padres in May for outfielder George Hendrick. Although most of his other numbers fell off, he set his career high with fourteen wins between the two clubs. That wasn't enough to keep Rasmussen in the Padres' starting rotation, though, as he spent the next two seasons bouncing back and forth between starting and relieving. Following the 1980 season, Rasmussen was released by the Padres.

=== Mexican League, and back to St. Louis ===
That winter, Rasmussen pitched in the Mexican League, and spent all of 1981 and part of 1982 with the Leones de Yucatán. He returned to the Cardinals, who were in the midst of a playoff drive, that September. He pitched in eight games, going 1–2 with a 4.42 ERA. His one win came on the final day of the season against the Chicago Cubs, as the Cards won the National League East by three games over the Philadelphia Phillies. Rasmussen was not part of the World Series champions' post season roster.

Rasmussen opened the 1983 season with the Cardinals, but he was used sparingly. After a pair of poor outings in May, Rasmussen was sent to the minors. He started four games for the Triple-A Louisville Redbirds, going 2–2 with an ERA of 4.13, before being sold to the Kansas City Royals.

=== Kansas City Royals ===
The Royals released Vida Blue to make room in their starting rotation for Rasmussen. He rewarded their confidence by hurling a shutout against the Boston Red Sox. It was the first shutout by a Royals pitcher since October 1981, and his first major league shutout since 1979. It also earned him the distinction of being the only major league pitcher ever to hurl a shutout in both his National League and American League debuts. He appeared in 11 games in all for the Royals in 1983, including 9 starts, winning 3 games and losing 6 before a groin pull ended his season. At the end of the season, he was released.

=== Back in the minors ===
Rasmussen spent the next several seasons attempting to return to the major leagues. He spent 1984 with the Houston Astros organization, pitching for the Tucson Toros. In 1985, Rasmussen signed with the independent Miami Marlins and spent most of the season, and part of 1986 as well, although he did appear in one game for the Redbirds in 1985. He was picked up by the Baltimore Orioles partway through 1986, and he spent the next season and a half with their top farm club, the Rochester Red Wings.

=== Career statistics ===
| W | L | Pct | ERA | G | GS | CG | SHO | SV | IP | H | ER | R | HR | BB | K | WP | HBP | BAA | Fld% | Avg. | SH |
| 50 | 77 | .394 | 3.85 | 238 | 144 | 27 | 12 | 5 | 1017.2 | 1033 | 435 | 489 | 87 | 309 | 489 | 15 | 11 | .266 | .969 | .119 | 34 |

Rasmussen described his best pitch as a fastball. He threw a four-seam, a two-seam and a cut fastball.

Though never much of a hitter, he collected the game-winning RBI of his August 5 start during his rookie season. He had ten career RBIs. His only career two RBI game came against reigning Cy Young Award winner Randy Jones in 1977.

Despite becoming a coach in 1988, Rasmussen did not stop playing professional baseball. He went on to pitch for the Fort Myers Sun Sox for the duration of the two-year run of the Senior Professional Baseball Association in 1989–1990.

=== Coaching ===
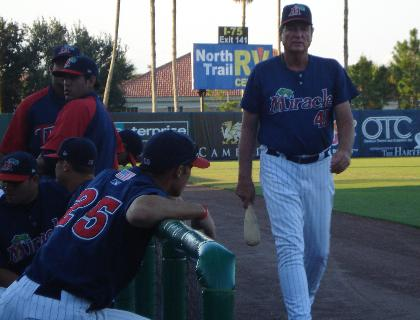
Coach Rasmussen of the Fort Myers Miracle

Rasmussen accepted a pitching coach position in the Cleveland Indians' minor league system in 1988. In 1991, he jumped over to the Minnesota Twins' organization, where he has remained ever since. From 1991 through 1995 he was the pitching coach for the Rookie level Gulf Coast League Twins, in 1996 and 1997, he coached the Twins' advanced A affiliate, the Fort Myers Miracle, in 1998 he jumped to the Double A New Britain Rock Cats, and in 1999, he returned to the Miracle. Following the 2008 season, Rasmussen was promoted to Twins Minor League Pitching Coordinator, which is the position he currently holds.

The entire 2008 starting rotation for the Twins all pitched for Rasmussen in Fort Myers. Some of the other notable names to have been coached by Rasmussen include Johan Santana, Matt Garza, LaTroy Hawkins and Mark Redman. Following Paul Molitor's hiring as Twins manager, he interviewed for the major league pitching coach job that ultimately went to Neil Allen.

== Personal life ==
Eric has been married to Linda Rasmussen since 1982. They currently reside in Cape Coral, Florida with their twin sons, Brock & Derek, who were born in 1990, and a third son named Michael.

Rasmussen was taught guitar by fellow San Diego Padres pitcher John D'Acquisto. They formed a band called Wild Pitch following the 1979 season, and played in local San Diego clubs.

Rasmussen was central in helping Sam Kuhnert form the NubAbility Athletic Foundation. NubAbility is a sports clinic for children who have lost a limb. Kuhert was born without a left hand.
