= St. Lucie Legends =

- 1989; Port St. Lucie, Florida

Minor league affiliations
- Previous classes: Independent Winter League
- League: Senior Professional Baseball Association
- Division: Southern Division

Team data
- Previous parks: Thomas J. White Stadium

The St. Lucie Legends was one of the eight original baseball franchises that played in the Senior Professional Baseball Association in 1989. The club played its home games at the then recently inaugurated Thomas J. White Stadium, located in Port St. Lucie, Florida.

The Legends featured players such as Vida Blue, a former American League MVP and Cy Young Award winner, as well as National League MVP George Foster and perennial All-Stars Bobby Bonds and Graig Nettles, who signed on as player-manager. Nevertheless, the Legends were an awful team that lost 20 of their first 23 games, which cost Nettles his manager's post, being replaced by Bonds for the remainder of the season.

The Legends finished the season with an overall record of 20–51 and did not make the playoffs. Juan Beníquez led the team with a .359 batting average, while Willie Aikens and Foster belted 11 home runs apiece.

In addition, the Legends had severe financial struggles while averaging only 607 fans for 36 home games. The club folded shortly thereafter.

== Notable players ==
- Willie Aikens
- Juan Beníquez
- Vida Blue
- Bobby Bonds
- Don Cooper
- John D'Acquisto
- George Foster
- Oscar Gamble
- Ed Glynn
- Fernando Gonzalez
- Ross Grimsley
- Jerry Grote
- Don Gullett
- Dave Hilton
- Al Holland
- Joe Horlen
- Clint Hurdle
- Jerry Johnson
- Von Joshua
- Bill Madlock
- Jerry Manuel
- Larry Milbourne
- Félix Millán
- Tom Murphy
- Ivan Murrell
- Randy Niemann
- Graig Nettles
- Jim Nettles
- Sergio Ferrer
- Steve Ontiveros
- Floyd Rayford
- Fred Stanley
- Roy Thomas
- Luis Tiant
- Jackson Todd
- Bill Travers
- Walt Williams
