= West Palm Beach Tropics =

- 1989–1990; West Palm Beach, Florida

Minor league affiliations
- Previous classes: Independent Winter League
- League: Senior Professional Baseball Association
- Division: Southern Division

Minor league titles
- Division titles: 1 (1989)

Team data
- Previous names: Florida Tropics (1990); West Palm Beach Tropics (1989)
- Previous parks: Municipal Stadium

The West Palm Beach Tropics were one of the eight original franchises that began play in the Senior Professional Baseball Association in 1989. The club hired Dick Williams as manager and fielded a lineup that included slugger Dave Kingman and Rollie Fingers. The Tropics went 52–20 in the regular season and ran away with the Southern Division title. Ron Washington led the club's offense, hitting .359 with a league-high 73 RBI. Mickey Rivers hit .366 and Kingman added 8 homers. The pitching staff was led by Juan Eichelberger, who went 11–5 with a 2.90 earned run average (ERA). Tim Stoddard also won 10 games for the club.

Local Valentino Falcone (a former minor leaguer) ruptured a hamstring stealing second base (one game before opening day) depriving him of an eventual roster spot.

Despite their regular season dominance, the Tropics lost, 12–4, to the St. Petersburg Pelicans in the SPBA's initial championship game.

The West Palm Beach Tropics returned for a second season, as a traveling team known as the Florida Tropics, however the team ceased operation when the league folded in December 1990.

== Attendance ==
The Tropics also had the league's best attendance record. A crowd of 3,404 showed up for opening night, an 8-1 victory over the St. Lucie Legends, and the average draw over 35 home dates settled at a respectable 1,600.

Unfortunately, the estimated break-even point for every franchise was 2,000 per game. Five of the league's eight teams did not get even half that figure.

The initial WPB team owners, future Florida Marlins and Boston Red Sox owner John Henry and Boca Raton lawyer Don Sider, sold the Tropics after the first season, convinced the league would fail in its attempt to expand to California and Arizona. New York theatrical producer Mitch Maxwell purchased the club but never completed financial requirements with the league and tried to sell the team back to Henry. The former home of the tropics, Municipal Stadium, was later demolished and is now a Home Depot.

== Coaches and staff ==
=== Manager and coaches ===
- Manager: Dick Williams
- Coaches: Bob Fralick, Ed Rakow, Larry Brown

=== Front Office ===
- Ken Shepard, Vice President of Operations / Manager (died 2014)
- Ken Burlew, Asst. Dir. of Operations
- Michelle Jaminet, Vice President of Marketing
- Dale Patten, Ticket Manager
- Frank Calieri, Marketing Assistant

== Notable players ==
- Benny Ayala
- Pete Broberg
- Ray Burris
- Doug Capilla
- Mike Easler
- Juan Eichelberger
- Rollie Fingers
- Toby Harrah
- Al Hrabosky
- Randy Johnson
- Ron Johnson
- Odell Jones
- Dave Kingman
- Lee Lacy
- Gary Lance
- Tito Landrum
- Renie Martin
- Will McEnaney
- Paul Mirabella
- Sid Monge
- Dan Norman
- Lowell Palmer
- Luis Pujols
- Ed Rakow
- Mickey Rivers
- Rodney Scott
- Tim Stoddard
- Tom Underwood
- Mark Wagner
- Ron Washington
- Jerry White
