= Orlando Juice =

- 1989; Orlando, Florida

Minor league affiliations
- Previous classes: Independent Winter League
- League: Senior Professional Baseball Association
- Division: Northern Division

Team data
- Previous parks: Tinker Field
- Owner/ Operator: Philip J. Breen

The Orlando Juice was one of the eight original franchises that began playing in the Senior Professional Baseball Association in 1989. The team was managed by Gates Brown, while Dyar Miller and Bill Stein served as player-coaches. The club was owned by Philip J. Breen, a mortgage executive who disappeared in 1990 after he was accused of embezzling over $10 million from a Detroit business.

In their inaugural season, the Juice finished third in the Northern Division with a 37–35 record, narrowly missing the playoffs. The team had a slow start with Brown at the helm (9–12), but improved in the midseason (28–23) under Miller's management.

Pitcher Pete Falcone anchored the club's pitching staff with a 10–3 record, and Bob Galasso contributed with a 9–2 mark and topped the staff with a 2.67 ERA. The offense was led by José Cruz, who hit a .306 average with a team-best 10 home runs and 49 runs batted in, while Randy Bass batted .393 and drove in 27 runs. Nevertheless, the Orlando Juice ceased operations at the end of the season.

== Notable players ==
- Randy Bass
- Jack Billingham
- Larvell Blanks
- Ike Blessitt
- Vida Blue
- Bruce Bochy
- Roy Branch
- Steve Busby
- Sal Butera
- Dave Cash
- Doug Corbett
- Mark Corey
- Mike Cosgrove
- José Cruz
- Jamie Easterly
- Pete Falcone
- Bob Galasso
- Wayne Granger
- Johnny Grubb
- Ken Landreaux
- Sixto Lezcano
- Bake McBride
- Bill Madlock
- Jerry Martin
- Larry Milbourne
- Dyar Miller
- Tom Paciorek
- Gerry Pirtle
- Ken Reitz
- Gil Rondon
- Bob Shirley
- Paul Siebert
- Bill Stein
- Jackson Todd
- Mike Vail
- U L Washington
