= Tim Ireland (baseball) =

American baseball player

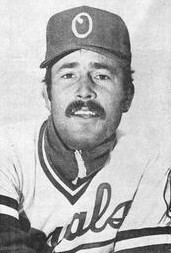
- Ireland in 1980
- Infielder
- Born: March 14, 1953 (age 73); Oakland, California, U.S.
- Batted: Right Threw: Right

MLB debut
- September 20, 1981, for the Kansas City Royals

Last MLB appearance
- May 25, 1982, for the Kansas City Royals

MLB statistics
- Batting average: .143
- Home runs: 0
- Runs batted in: 0

NPB statistics
- Batting average: .275
- Home runs: 18
- Runs batted in: 67
- Stats at Baseball Reference

Teams
- Kansas City Royals (1981–1982); Hiroshima Toyo Carp (1983–1984)

Timothy Neal Christopher Ireland (born March 14, 1953) is an American former professional baseball player. He played parts of two seasons in Major League Baseball for the Kansas City Royals, appearing in 11 games in 1981 and 1982. He has also managed 12 seasons at various levels of the minor leagues.

Ireland was originally selected in the 25th round of the 1973 Major League Baseball draft by the Montreal Expos. He was released by Montreal in April 1975, and over the next four seasons was under contract to five different organizations, ending up with the Royals in May 1977. He spent four more seasons with the Royals organization before making it to the majors in 1981, when he played four games at first base without coming to bat. He did score one run that season as a pinch runner. In 1982 he played in 7 additional games, including a pair of starts in right field, going 1-for-7 at the plate. In December, he was released. He then played two seasons for the Hiroshima Toyo Carp in Japan, and for the Fort Myers Sun Sox in the Senior Professional Baseball Association in 1989.

After his playing career, he managed the Salinas Spurs in the California League in 1989. He then managed from 1992 until 1997 in the Milwaukee Brewers farm system, winning league titles with the Stockton Ports in the California League in 1992 and with the El Paso Diablos in the Texas League in 1994.

He spent the next three seasons as a scout for the Colorado Rockies, mostly in the Pacific Rim, signing Chin-hui Tsao among other players. In 2001, he returned to minor league managing with the independent Sonoma County Crushers. The following season, he was hired by the Texas Rangers, and managed in their system until 2004, when he won another league title with the Frisco RoughRiders of the Texas League.

In 2005, the Rangers made Ireland their minor league baserunning coordinator. In 2006, he started the season as manager of the Oklahoma RedHawks, but was replaced after 33 games by Mike Boulanger.

== Sources ==
- Career statistics from ESPN · Baseball Reference · Fangraphs · Baseball Reference (Minors) · Retrosheet · Baseball Almanac, or Retrosheet

Preceded by Paul Carey	Tulsa Drillers Manager; 2002	Succeeded by Marv Foley
