= Shooting of Robbie Tolan =

2008 shooting in Bellaire, Texas, U.S.

- Date: December 31, 2008; 17 years ago
- Location: Bellaire, Texas, U.S.
- Type: Police shooting
- Participants: Sgt. Jeffrey Cotton (shooter); Robbie Tolan (victim)
- Charges: Aggravated assault by a public servant
- Verdict: Not guilty
- Litigation: Lawsuit settled for $110,000

The Robbie Tolan shooting incident took place in Bellaire, Texas, on December 31, 2008, when ten-year Bellaire police veteran Jeffrey Cotton shot unarmed Robbie Tolan, son of major league baseball player Bobby Tolan, in his parents' driveway. Tolan sustained serious injuries in the shooting and charges were pressed against Cotton. On May 11, 2010, a jury reached a verdict of not guilty and Cotton was acquitted. Minority leaders and critics around the country cite the case as an example of racial profiling and institutional racism. A federal civil lawsuit was also filed by the Tolan family. The suit was later settled for $110,000.

== Background ==
Robert Tolan (born July 15, 1985) is the son of Major League Baseball player Bobby Tolan of the St. Louis Cardinals and the Cincinnati Reds. He himself played professional baseball for the Washington Nationals organization. Since the shooting incident, he has not played in professional baseball; he last played for the Bay Area Toros. Robbie was shot while Sgt. Cotton was carrying out an investigation suspecting Tolan to be the driver of a stolen vehicle. However, Tolan was the registered owner of the vehicle.

== Shooting incident ==
Around 2:00 a.m. December 31, 2008, Robbie Tolan and his cousin were confronted in their driveway in the predominantly white city of Bellaire, Texas, by police officers who suspected that the young men were driving a stolen vehicle. According to relatives, the two young men were returning from a late night run to Jack in the Box. Tolan's cousin, Anthony Cooper, reported that the police officers emerged from the darkness pointing a flashlight and gun at them. The officer reportedly commanded them to stop before announcing his status as a police officer. After the officer ordered them to get on the ground, Tolan's parents, Marian and Robert Tolan, came outside to attend to the unidentified noise. At this point, Cotton arrived on the scene as backup to the original officer. Robbie Tolan and other family members report that the altercation between Robbie Tolan and Cotton ensued while Robbie Tolan was lying on the porch facing away from his mother and Cotton. After Cotton pushed Tolan's mother up against the garage door, according to the Police statement, Robbie got up from the ground and turned around toward the policeman. Tolan and his mother state that Robbie did not stand, but pushed up from lying on the ground to all fours while turning around. Cotton turned and fired a shot into Robbie Tolan's chest, sending the bullet through his lung and into his liver, where it lodged and threatened his life. Cotton stated that he thought Tolan was reaching for a weapon and reacted quickly in what he thought was self-defense. Evidence of how the bullet entered through his chest and traveled through his body to lodge in his liver suggest that Tolan was on all fours or he was bent over when he was penetrated by the bullet. Afterward Cotton searched Tolan, who was on the ground, and found no weapon on his person. The police department called the shooting tragic and put Cotton on administrative leave, while rejecting that any allegation of racial profiling would be entertained by the police department.

== Criminal trial and acquittal ==
The Harris County district attorney's office pressed charges against Cotton for aggravated assault by a public servant in the matter of the shooting of Tolan, claiming that he neglected the basic safety procedures before shooting Tolan. The case involved discussion of racial profiling and racial bias on the part of Cotton; Cotton is white and Tolan is black. The jury featured seven white women, three white men and two black women. Cotton was freed on $20,000 bond while the case was pending. On May 11, 2010, a jury reached a verdict of not guilty and Cotton was acquitted. Minority leaders and critics around the country continue to cite the case as an example of racial profiling and institutional racism. Moreover, the jury declined to convict Cotton on a variety of lesser included offenses including assault, deadly conduct, and reckless endangerment. After the acquittal of Cotton, African American leaders and activists protested outside the police department for what they perceived to be a case of racial bias and injustice.

== Civil trial ==
Pursuant to the allegations of racial bias, profiling, and discrimination, a civil suit was filed against Cotton and the city of Bellaire. The federal civil case was initially dismissed by U.S. District Judge Melinda Harmon of the District Court for the Southern District of Texas based on qualified immunity, then appealed to the United States Court of Appeals for the Fifth Circuit, where a three-judge panel upheld the dismissal from the District Court based on qualified immunity. The case was appealed to the full Fifth Circuit Court en banc who also upheld the dismissal based on qualified immunity. After a final appeal to the Supreme Court, the case was returned to the Fifth Circuit Court of Appeals for further review. The Fifth Circuit Court of Appeals revised its original decision slightly, vacating a small portion of the District Court's decision, and remanded the case back to the District Court for further review. The District Court set a trial date for September 2015. A few days before the trial was scheduled to begin, the federal judge removed the City of Bellaire as a defendant in the lawsuit, which prompted the Tolan family to file a motion for the judge to recuse herself. According to Tolan's mother, on Monday, September 14, 2015, the judge dismissed all of the plaintiff's expert witnesses, but none of the defense's expert witnesses. Robbie Tolan had been under a great deal of emotional distress during the seven-year court proceeding and told his family he did not want to continue the process. While Tolan's mother wanted to continue to fight in this case, the family decided to request a settlement with the City in lieu of a trial. In 2015, a settlement was reached with the City of Bellaire for $110,000 (equivalent to $149,000 in 2025).
