= Rafael Vásquez (baseball) =

Dominican baseball player (born 1958)

- Pitcher
- Born: June 28, 1958 (age 68); La Romana, Dominican Republic
- Batted: Right Threw: Right

MLB debut
- April 6, 1979, for the Seattle Mariners

Last MLB appearance
- May 10, 1979, for the Seattle Mariners

MLB statistics
- Win–loss record: 1–0
- Earned run average: 5.06
- Strikeouts: 9
- Stats at Baseball Reference

Teams
- Seattle Mariners (1979)

Rafael Vásquez Santiago (born June 28, 1958) is a Dominican former Major League Baseball (MLB) pitcher who appeared in nine games with the Seattle Mariners in 1979. He had been traded along with Mario Mendoza and Odell Jones from the Pittsburgh Pirates to the Mariners for Enrique Romo, Tom McMillan and Rick Jones at the Winter Meetings on December 5, 1978.

Vásquez signed with the Pirates in December 1975. He pitched once in Triple-A in 1977 prior to the trade to Seattle. He appeared in 9 games in relief for the Mariners in 1979, spending most of the season as a starter with the Triple-A Spokane Indians. He won his only MLB decision, beating the New York Yankees after throwing four scoreless innings on April 29, also his longest MLB appearance.

Seattle traded him to the Cleveland Indians after the 1979 season with Rob Pietroburgo and a player to be named later, later identified as Bud Anderson, for Ted Cox. Cleveland then traded Vasquez back to Pittsburgh with Gary Alexander, Víctor Cruz, and Bob Owchinko for future Hall of Famer Bert Blyleven as well as Manny Sanguillén in December 1980. After pitching in Double-A in 1981, Vásquez pitched in the Mexican League, for Petroleros de Poza Rica in 1982 and 1983, then Rojos del Águila de Veracruz and Piratas de Campeche in 1984.
