= Daytona Beach Explorers =

- 1990; Daytona Beach, Florida

Minor league affiliations
- Previous classes: Independent Winter League
- League: Senior Professional Baseball Association

The Daytona Beach Explorers was a baseball club that played in the Senior Professional Baseball Association in 1990. They were a replacement team when the originals Bradenton Explorers relocated to Daytona Beach, Florida, and played its games at the Jackie Robinson Ballpark.

Managed by Clete Boyer and coached by Tony Cloninger, the Beach Explorers had registered an 11–11 record and was in fourth place when the league ceased operations on December 28, 1990.

== Notable players ==
- Derek Botelho
- César Cedeño
- Stan Cliburn
- Stew Cliburn
- José Cruz
- Orlando González
- Ross Grimsley
- Garth Iorg
- Jeff Jones
- Wayne Krenchicki
- Pete LaCock
- Rick Lysander
- Mickey Mahler
- Tippy Martinez
- Omar Moreno
- Ken Reitz
- Dave Sax
- George Vukovich
- Ron Washington
- Tack Wilson
