= Rick Lysander =

American baseball player (born 1953)

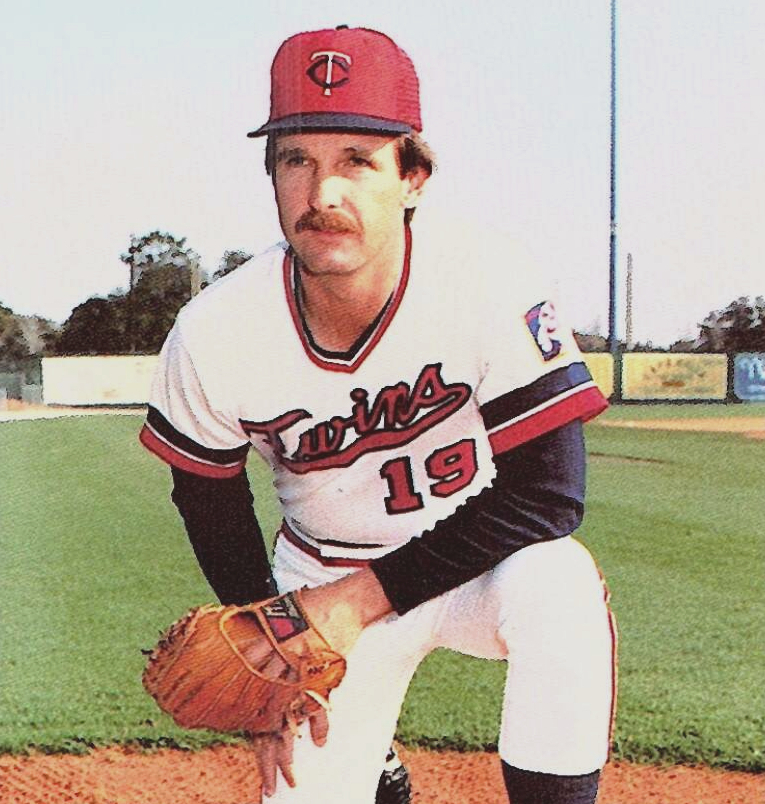
- Lysander with the Minnesota Twins c. 1985
- Pitcher
- Born: February 21, 1953 (age 72); Huntington Park, California, U.S.
- Batted: Right Threw: Right

MLB debut
- April 12, 1980, for the Oakland Athletics

Last MLB appearance
- October 1, 1985, for the Minnesota Twins

MLB statistics
- Win–loss record: 9–17
- Earned run average: 4.28
- Strikeouts: 111
- Stats at Baseball Reference

Teams
- Oakland Athletics (1980); Minnesota Twins (1983–1985)

Richard Eugene Lysander (born February 21, 1953) is an American former professional baseball pitcher. He had a four-season career in the majors, spread out over six years.

== Career ==
=== Major League career ===
Lysander was drafted by the Oakland Athletics in 1974, and he toiled in the minors for several years before finally pitching five games for the A's in 1980. He was then returned to the minors, and remained there for the rest of 1980 and all of 1981. Oakland traded him to the Houston Astros after the 1981 season, but Lysander never played in the majors for Houston. The Astros traded him on to the Minnesota Twins for Bob Veselic the following off-season, and in 1983 Rick was back in the majors. He remained with the Twins until 1985, after which he was released, ending his major-league career.

=== Post-MLB life ===
Lysander didn't give up on pitching entirely, and eventually found a home in the Senior Professional Baseball Association. In 1989 he pitched for the Bradenton Explorers, leading the league in saves with 11. In 1990, he moved on to the Daytona Beach Explorers, pitching in eight games without allowing an earned run. This earned him a minor league contract with the Toronto Blue Jays, and he pitched in ten games for the Syracuse Chiefs that season before retiring.

Rick's son, Brent, pitched in the A's minor league organization in 2007-08, and for the independent Lake Erie Crushers in 2009.
