= Tom Zimmer =

American baseball player

Thomas Jeffrey Zimmer (born June 30, 1952, in Mobile, Alabama) has held multiple roles in professional baseball. He played in the minor leagues non-consecutively from 1971 to 1979, coached for the St. Louis Cardinals in 1976, managed in the minor leagues from 1977 through 1980 and coached the St. Petersburg Pelicans in 1989. He is currently a scout for the San Francisco Giants.

A catcher, he began his professional career in 1971 at the age of 19 after being taken in the third round of that year's draft. He played until 1979, missing 1976 and 1978, hitting .247 in 318 games. He played in the Cardinals (1971–1975) and the Pittsburgh Pirates (1979) organizations.

He managed the Victoria Rosebuds (1977), Butte Copper Kings (1978), Shelby Pirates (1979) and Salinas Angels (1980).

He has scouted for the Giants since at least 1981.

His father was longtime baseball figure Don Zimmer. His uncle, Hal Zimmer, played in the minor leagues in the early 1950s.
