= Rick Jones (pitcher) =

American baseball player (born 1955)

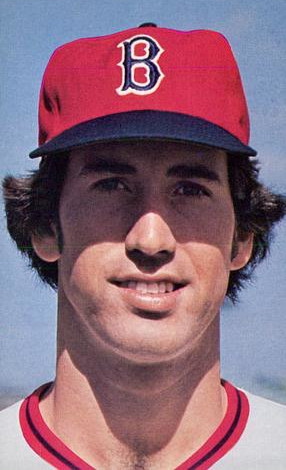
- Jones in 1976
- Pitcher
- Born: April 16, 1955 (age 71); Jacksonville, Florida, U.S.
- Batted: Left Threw: Left

MLB debut
- April 18, 1976, for the Boston Red Sox

Last MLB appearance
- September 30, 1978, for the Seattle Mariners

MLB statistics
- Win–loss record: 6–9
- Earned run average: 4.02
- Strikeouts: 72
- Stats at Baseball Reference

Teams
- Boston Red Sox (1976); Seattle Mariners (1977–1978)

Thomas Frederick Jones (born April 16, 1955) is an American former starting pitcher in Major League Baseball (MLB) who played from 1976 through 1978 for the Boston Red Sox (1976) and Seattle Mariners (1977–78). Listed at 6 ft 5 in (1.96 m), 190 lb, he threw and batted left-handed.

The Red Sox selected Jones in the fifth round of the 1973 MLB draft out of Nathan Bedford Forrest High School in Jacksonville, Florida. He suffered an arm injury before his senior year of high school, but Boston drafted him as a pitcher. He made his MLB debut in April 1976. After Boston manager Darrell Johnson was fired, new manager Don Zimmer demoted Jones to the minors in June after Jones missed a team flight.

The Mariners, managed by Johnson, selected Jones in the 1976 MLB expansion draft. Jones set a franchise record with 11 walks in a game on June 18, 1977, his only win with Seattle. After his next appearance, he had an elbow injury that required surgery, ending his season and lowering his fastball velocity.

In three years in MLB, Jones had a 6–9 record with 72 strikeouts and a 4.02 earned run average in 159 innings pitched.

Seattle traded Jones, Enrique Romo, and Tom McMillan to the Pittsburgh Pirates for Mario Mendoza, Odell Jones, and Rafael Vásquez at the Winter Meetings on December 5, 1978.

Following his time in the majors, Jones pitched in the minor leagues through 1980 for the Portland Beavers of the Pacific Coast League. He played for Tigres Capitalinos in the Mexican Baseball League in 1981. After ending his playing career, Jones lived in Jacksonville.
