= Floyd Rayford =

American baseball player (born 1957)

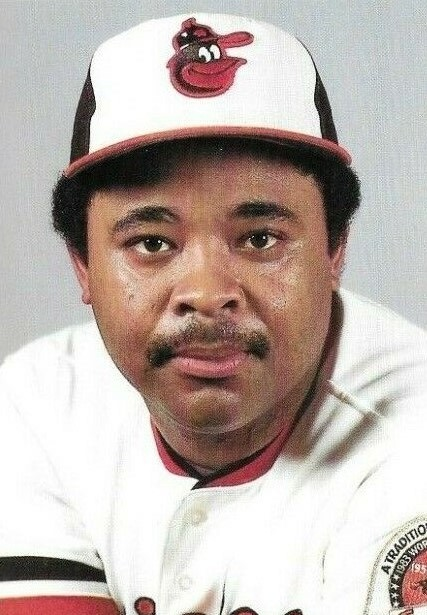
- Third baseman / Catcher
- Born: July 27, 1957 (age 69); Memphis, Tennessee, U.S.
- Batted: Right Threw: Right

MLB debut
- April 17, 1980, for the Baltimore Orioles

Last MLB appearance
- September 16, 1987, for the Baltimore Orioles

MLB statistics
- Batting average: .244
- Home runs: 38
- Runs batted in: 117
- Stats at Baseball Reference

Teams
- Baltimore Orioles (1980, 1982); St. Louis Cardinals (1983); Baltimore Orioles (1984–1987)

Floyd Kinnard Rayford (born July 27, 1957) is an American retired professional baseball player. He played seven seasons in Major League Baseball (MLB) for the Baltimore Orioles and St. Louis Cardinals. He primarily played third base and catcher during his career. He was known as "Sugar Bear" and a fan favorite for his roly-poly physique.

== Early career ==
Rayford's professional baseball career began in 1975, when he was drafted as a catcher out of Manual Arts High School in the fourth round of the amateur draft by the California Angels. He spent the 1975 through 1979 seasons in the Angels' minor league system, spending the 1979 season at the Triple-A level playing for the Salt Lake City Gulls. In his first Triple-A season, he batted .294 with 13 home runs while playing third base.

== Baltimore Orioles (first stint) ==
After playing one season for the Gulls, Rayford was traded, along with an undisclosed amount of money, from the Angels organization to the Baltimore Orioles in exchange for Larry Harlow. In 1980, Rayford made his major league debut for the Orioles; over the course of the season he played in 8 games for the Orioles while spending most of the year with the Triple-A Rochester Red Wings. He spent the entire 1981 season with the Red Wings, during which he played on the losing side of the longest game in baseball history and caught the 31st inning of that game. In 1982, he returned to the Major League with the Orioles, but he hit only .132 in 34 games.

When Cal Ripken Jr. began his streak of 2,632 consecutive games played in 1982, Rayford was the player who Ripken replaced in the lineup. Rayford had been given a day off in the second game of a doubleheader and Ripken started at third base in his place.

He again returned to Rochester in 1983, and hit .371 in 42 games with the Red Wings.

== St. Louis Cardinals ==
Rayford was traded to the St. Louis Cardinals on June 13, 1983, in a transaction that was completed 2 1/2 months later when Tito Landrum was sent to the Orioles on August 31. He was the backup third baseman behind Ken Oberkfell that year and hit .212 in 56 games for the Cardinals.

== Baltimore Orioles (second stint) ==
Less than a year after trading Rayford, the Orioles purchased his contract from the Cardinals before the 1984 season. He served primarily as a backup catcher in his first year back with the Orioles, and his hitting numbers improved, with his average reaching .256 in 1984. Sharing time as the regular third baseman in 1985, he had a career year, hitting .306 with 18 home runs and 48 runs batted in, all career highs. Entering the 1986 season, he was expected to replace Rick Dempsey as catcher with Jackie Gutiérrez becoming the starting third baseman, but his numbers fell when he batted .176 and was sent back to Rochester. He split the 1987 season between Baltimore and Rochester and batted .220 at the Major League level in what would prove to be his final major league season.

== Minor league career ==
Before retiring as a player, Rayford played parts of three seasons, from 1989 to 1991, with the Triple-A Scranton/Wilkes-Barre Red Barons, playing in 81 games with the club over the three-year span. During the latter two seasons, Rayford served as a player-coach, starting a long tenure as a minor league coach. Since 1990, he has coached eight separate minor league teams, and in 1996, he spent his only season to date as a minor league manager, doing so for the Batavia Clippers. He has been a member of the Rock Cats' coaching staff since 2005.
