= St. Petersburg Pelicans =

- 1989–1990; St. Petersburg, Florida

Minor league affiliations
- Previous classes: Independent Winter League
- League: Senior Professional Baseball Association
- Division: Northern Division

Minor league titles
- League titles: 1 (1989)
- Division titles: 1 (1989)

Team data
- Previous parks: Al Lang Stadium

The St. Petersburg Pelicans were one of the eight original franchises that began playing in the Senior Professional Baseball Association in 1989. The team was managed by Bobby Tolan, while Dick Bosman, Ozzie Virgil, Sr. and Tom Zimmer served as coaches. They played their home games at Al Lang Stadium in Downtown St. Petersburg, Florida.

The Pelicans went 42-30 in the regular season and won the Northern Division title. Steve Henderson hit .352 for the club, and Lenny Randle batted .349. Milt Wilcox went 12-3, and Jon Matlack added 10 wins. Led by Lamar Johnson's home run and three RBI, the Pelicans went on to beat the West Palm Beach Tropics 12-4 to win the league's championship game.

The team returned for a second season but ceased operation when the league folded in December 1990.

== Notable players ==
- Alan Bannister
- Len Barker
- Butch Benton
- Todd Cruz
- Iván de Jesús
- Taylor Duncan
- Dock Ellis
- Sergio Ferrer
- George Foster
- Luis Gómez
- Glenn Gulliver
- Al Holland
- Steve Henderson
- Roy Howell
- Lamar Johnson
- Steve Kemp
- Pete LaCock
- Ken Landreaux
- Tito Landrum
- Bill Lee
- Ron LeFlore
- Randy Lerch
- Dwight Lowry
- Jerry Martin
- Jon Matlack
- Bake McBride
- Joe Pittman
- Dave Rajsich
- Gary Rajsich
- Lenny Randle
- Jerry Reed
- Jim Rice
- Dave Rozema
- Joe Sambito
- Elías Sosa
- Sammy Stewart
- Ozzie Virgil, Jr.
- Chris Welsh
- Milt Wilcox
- Mike Williams
- Pat Zachry

== Notes ==
The original St. Petersburg Pelicans were a team that played in the 1940s and 1950s in the Florida State Negro Baseball League. They played its home games at Campbell Park in St. Petersburg.

On June 21, 2008 the Tampa Bay Rays wore St. Petersburg Pelicans jerseys to honor the team in a game against the Houston Astros.
