= Enrique Romo =

Mexican baseball player (born 1947)

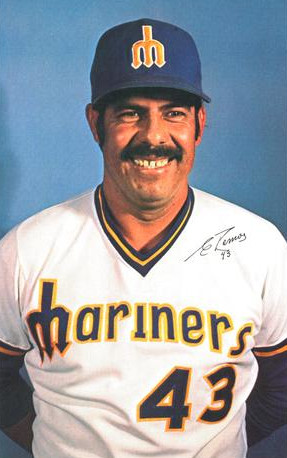
- Romo in 1978
- Pitcher
- Born: July 15, 1947 (age 78); Santa Rosalía, Baja California Sur, Mexico
- Batted: Right Threw: Right

MLB debut
- April 7, 1977, for the Seattle Mariners

Last MLB appearance
- October 1, 1982, for the Pittsburgh Pirates

MLB statistics
- Win–loss record: 44–33
- Earned run average: 3.45
- Strikeouts: 436
- Saves: 52
- Stats at Baseball Reference

Teams
- Seattle Mariners (1977–1978); Pittsburgh Pirates (1979–1982)

Career highlights and awards
- World Series champion (1979)

Member of the Mexican Professional

Baseball Hall of Fame
- Induction: 2003

Enrique Romo Navarro (born July 15, 1947) is a Mexican former professional baseball relief pitcher who played for the Seattle Mariners (1977–78) and Pittsburgh Pirates (1979–82). Romo batted and threw right-handed. He was born in Santa Rosalía, Baja California Sur, and is the younger brother of Vicente Romo, who also pitched in the majors.

== Career ==
In a six-season career, Romo posted a 44–33 record with a 3.45 ERA, 52 saves, and 436 strikeouts in 350 games pitched.

Romo pitched 11 seasons in Mexican baseball prior to making his major league debut for the Seattle Mariners in 1977 at the age of 29. In his rookie season, he led the Mariners with 16 saves.

He was acquired along with Tom McMillan and Rick Jones by the Pirates from the Mariners for Mario Mendoza, Odell Jones and Rafael Vásquez at the Winter Meetings on December 5, 1978. His most productive season came with the 1979 World Series Champions, with whom he had a 10–5 mark, a 2.99 ERA, career-highs in games (84) and innings (129.3), exclusively as a set-up man for closer Kent Tekulve. Romo also made two appearances in the World Series, won by Pittsburgh over the Baltimore Orioles in seven games. On October 1, 1980, he slugged a grand slam home run against the New York Mets.

In 1983, Romo failed to report to spring training, first indicating he would arrive late due to one of his children dealing with chicken pox, and then later not attending at all, announcing the intention to join an unsanctioned league in Mexico. Pittsburgh warned Romo that such a move would require them to fine him $500 for each day of camp that he missed; ultimately, Romo remained in Mexico.

== Legacy ==
Along with his brother Vicente, Romo is a member of the Mexican Professional Baseball Hall of Fame, having been inducted in 2003. In 2010, the Romo brothers had their uniform numbers retired by Yaquis de Obregón of the Mexican Winter League. In 2015, Romo was announced as being part of the 2016 induction class of the Latino Baseball Hall of Fame.

== See also ==
- List of players from Mexico in Major League Baseball
