= Roy Branch =

American baseball player (born 1953)

- Pitcher
- Born: July 12, 1953 (age 73); St. Louis, Missouri, U.S.
- Batted: Right Threw: Right

MLB debut
- September 11, 1979, for the Seattle Mariners

Last MLB appearance
- September 18, 1979, for the Seattle Mariners

MLB statistics
- Win–loss record: 0–1
- Earned run average: 7.94
- Strikeouts: 6
- Stats at Baseball Reference

Teams
- Seattle Mariners (1979)

Roy Branch (born July 12, 1953) is an American former professional baseball pitcher who played in two games for the Seattle Mariners of Major League Baseball (MLB) in 1979.

Branch attended Beaumont High School in St. Louis, Missouri. His senior season, he threw a perfect game, striking out every batter he faced in that game, and went 7–0 with a 0.59 earned run average. He was drafted in the first round, with the fifth overall pick of the 1971 MLB draft by the Kansas City Royals. He was drafted one round before the Royals selected future Hall of Famer George Brett. Branch threw a no-hitter in his first minor league season. Injuries limited his professional career. He had a bone chip removed from his elbow after only 3 starts in 1971, then had a strangulated hernia in 1973. He initially refused a demotion by the Royals in 1974. Frank White, who later starred with the Royals, said Branch taunted him and that they fought as teammates with the San Jose Bees in 1972.

The Mariners purchased Branch's contract from the Royals on January 23, 1978. Lou Gorman, the scout who originally signed Branch with the Royals, had become Seattle's general manager. Branch split both 1978 and 1979 between Triple-A and the Mexican Baseball League. He was a September call-up to the Mariners in 1979, starting two games in MLB. He allowed a home run to Mickey Rivers on his first MLB pitch, the first pitcher in franchise history to allow a home run on his first career pitch and the first pitcher to do so in the American League since 1972.

Branch pitched in Triple-A in 1980, then returned to Tecolotes de Nuevo Laredo in the Mexican League in 1982. He later pitched in the Senior Professional Baseball Association.

Branch played quarterback in high school but chose professional baseball over 20 college football scholarship offers because he didn't think he could be a professional black quarterback.

Branch also attended Manatee Junior College and Southern Illinois University.
