= Kim Allen (baseball) =

American baseball player (born 1953)

- Second baseman / Outfielder
- Born: April 5, 1953 (age 72); Fontana, California, U.S.
- Batted: Right Threw: Right

Professional debut
- MLB: September 2, 1980, for the Seattle Mariners
- NPB: April 3, 1982, for the Hanshin Tigers

Last appearance
- MLB: September 29, 1981, for the Seattle Mariners
- NPB: August 10, 1983, for the Hanshin Tigers

MLB statistics
- Batting average: .222
- Home runs: 0
- Runs batted in: 3

NPB statistics
- Batting average: .265
- Home runs: 5
- Runs batted in: 26
- Stats at Baseball Reference

Teams
- Seattle Mariners (1980–1981); Hanshin Tigers (1982–1983)

Kim Bryant Allen (born April 5, 1953) is an American former professional baseball player. He played in Major League Baseball for the Seattle Mariners.

== Career ==
Allen attended Riverside Polytechnic High School where he was teammates on the school's baseball team with Gary Lucas.

After playing college baseball for the UC Riverside Highlanders and having a nondescript minor league career, Allen briefly earned prospect status with the Seattle Mariners on the strength of his spectacular 1980 season for the Triple-A Spokane Indians. That season he registered a 35-game hitting streak and stole 84 bases, the most in the Pacific Coast League since 1913. He was called up to the Mariners in September 1980 and swiped 10 bags in 23 games.

Entering 1981, Allen was a dark horse Rookie of the Year candidate, as there was speculation that Mariners manager Maury Wills would embrace Allen's larcenous ways and would allow him to run wild. However, after breaking camp with the Mariners, Allen was used almost exclusively as a pinch-runner, and then was sent down at the end of April.

After his big league career, Allen played in Japan for the Hanshin Tigers during the 1982 and 1983 seasons. In 1982, he hit .260/.326/.358 and stole 22 bases in 28 tries and posted .276/.340/.409 in 47 games in 1983. Surprisingly, he was caught in eight of 20 steal attempts that year.

Allen also spent 1976 in the Mexican League while playing for the Alacranes de Durango.

In between, he played winter ball with the Navegantes del Magallanes club of the Venezuelan League in the 1980-81 season, and for the Petroleros de Zulia of the extinct Inter-American League in 1979.

Allen then suited up for the Senior Professional Baseball Association's Fort Myers Sun Sox in 1989 and led the league with 33 stolen bases.
