= Bobby Tolan =

American baseball player (born 1945)

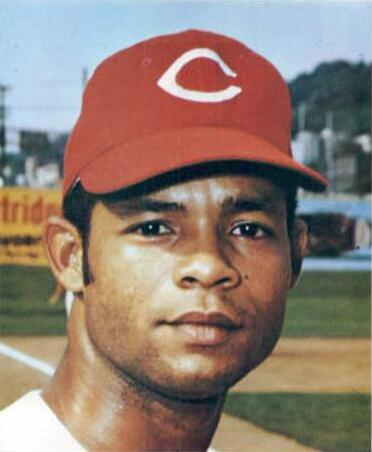
- Tolan in 1972
- Outfielder
- Born: November 19, 1945 (age 80); Los Angeles, California, U.S.
- Batted: Left Threw: Left

Professional debut
- MLB: September 3, 1965, for the St. Louis Cardinals
- NPB: April 9, 1978, for the Nankai Hawks

Last appearance
- NPB: September 13, 1978, for the Nankai Hawks
- MLB: September 19, 1979, for the San Diego Padres

MLB statistics
- Batting average: .265
- Home runs: 86
- Runs batted in: 497

NPB statistics
- Batting average: .267
- Home runs: 6
- Runs batted in: 36
- Stats at Baseball Reference

Teams
- St. Louis Cardinals (1965–1968); Cincinnati Reds (1969–1973); San Diego Padres (1974–1975); Philadelphia Phillies (1976–1977); Pittsburgh Pirates (1977); Nankai Hawks (1978); San Diego Padres (1979)

Career highlights and awards
- World Series champion (1967); NL stolen base leader (1970)

Robert Tolan (born November 19, 1945) is an American former professional baseball center fielder / right fielder, and coach, who played in Major League Baseball (MLB) for the St. Louis Cardinals (1965–1968), Cincinnati Reds (1969–1973), San Diego Padres (1974–1975, 1979), Philadelphia Phillies (1976–1977), and Pittsburgh Pirates (1977); he also played one season in Nippon Professional Baseball (NPB), for the Nankai Hawks (1978). Tolan batted and threw left-handed.

== Career ==
Tolan served during the Vietnam War in the 478th Engineer Battalion of the U.S. Army based at Fort Thomas, Kentucky. His unit included several of his teammates including Johnny Bench, Pete Rose and Darrel Chaney.

Tolan was a reserve outfielder during his years with the Cardinals, with whom he won a World Series title in 1967. He also played on the 1968 National League champions; however, the Cardinals lost to the Detroit Tigers in the World Series in seven games, after leading three games to one. Seeking to boost their offense, the Cardinals traded Tolan and reliever Wayne Granger to Cincinnati for veteran outfielder Vada Pinson.

Finally given the opportunity to play every day, Tolan blossomed. As Cincinnati's regular center fielder, often batting second behind Pete Rose and in front of Alex Johnson in the Reds' lineup, Tolan in 1969 hit .305 and established career highs in home runs and runs batted in (21 and 93 respectively). In this, the first year both leagues were split into two divisions, the Reds finished third in the National League West, four games behind the division-winning Atlanta Braves. The "Big Red Machine", which also featured future Hall of Famers Johnny Bench and Tony Pérez (and would later feature a third, Joe Morgan), was just beginning to take shape.

In 1970, Tolan batted a career high .316 with 16 home runs and 80 RBIs, and led the National League in stolen bases with 57 (the only time former Cardinal teammate Lou Brock did not lead the National League in steals between 1966 and 1974) for a Reds team that won the National League West title for their first postseason berth since the 1961 World Series. The Reds swept the Pittsburgh Pirates in the NLCS in three games; in the second game, Tolan scored all three runs in a 3–1 victory, including hitting a fifth-inning home run off starter Luke Walker. However, the Baltimore Orioles defeated the Reds in the World Series in five games. Tolan went 4-for-19 in the Series, including a home run off Mike Cuellar in Game Two.

Tolan missed the 1971 season after rupturing his Achilles tendon playing basketball, which violated a specific clause in his contract barring him from that activity. He came back in 1972, winning both the Comeback Player of the Year award and the Hutch Award after batting .283 with 82 RBI and 42 stolen bases. Tolan became only the second player to win both the Hutch Award and his league's Comeback Player of the Year Award (Tony Conigliaro was the first) and the first to do so during the same season. His Reds again defeated the Pirates in the NLCS (this time with the winning run scoring on a wild pitch by Bob Moose, after the Reds entered the ninth inning trailing by a run) to win the pennant; however, they were defeated by the Oakland Athletics in the World Series in seven games. Two Tolan miscues contributed to the Game 7 loss. In the first inning, Tolan's 3-base error on a misplayed ball hit by Ángel Mangual led to Oakland's first run. In the sixth, Tolan looked like he had a bead on a double to the base of the center field wall by Sal Bando but the ball fell for a hit. Tolan said his hamstring tightened which inhibited his ability to make that play. After the 3–2 loss to Oakland, Tolan apologized to his teammates in the locker room.

The poor 1972 finish spilled over into the next year for Tolan, as 1973 was a disastrous year for him. Tolan's batting average plummeted to .206, he became a malcontent and had several squabbles with Reds management, who were still unhappy with his 1971 basketball injury. Tolan also went AWOL for two days in August and broke team rules by growing a beard. On September 27, the team suspended Tolan for the remainder of the season. The Reds won yet another division title but the suspension forced Tolan to miss the NLCS, which the Reds lost to the New York Mets. At the end of the season the Reds traded Tolan to the Padres for pitcher Clay Kirby. After the trade the Major League Baseball Players Association filed a grievance on Tolan's behalf. During the 1974 season, in which he batted .266 in 95 games, he learned that he had won his grievance. Tolan demanded that the Reds publicly apologize to him because his name had been slandered but never got the apology.

Tolan was released by the Padres after batting .255 in 1975. He signed with the Philadelphia Phillies as a free agent, and in 1976 batted .261 as a part-time outfielder. The Phillies won the National League East title to earn their first post-season appearance since the "Whiz Kids" were swept by the New York Yankees in the 1950 World Series. However, Tolan's former team, the Reds, defeated the Phillies in the NLCS.

Tolan played professionally in Japan in 1978. He was also a coach for the Padres from 1980–1983. During the strike of 1981, Tolan was dispatched to Walla Walla, Washington, where he was Tony Gwynn's first hitting coach. He was a coach for the Seattle Mariners in 1987. Tolan also was player-manager of the St. Petersburg Pelicans, a team in the Senior Professional Baseball Association, in the two years of the league's operation, 1989–1990.

In his major league career, Tolan batted .265 with 86 home runs and 497 runs batted in, in 1,282 games played.

== Personal life ==
Tolan and his wife have a son, Robbie Tolan, who played professional baseball in the Washington Nationals organization. On December 31, 2008, Robbie was shot by a Bellaire, Texas policeman allegedly investigating reports of a stolen car after a confrontation in the Tolan driveway. The younger Tolan was unarmed and driving his own vehicle. The bullet lodged in Tolan's liver; the injury may have ended his professional baseball career. An investigation into the shooting was ongoing as of January 2009.

Tolan's cousin, Eddie Tolan, was a sprinter who won two gold medals in the 1932 Summer Olympics.

== See also ==
- List of Major League Baseball annual stolen base leaders
- List of Major League Baseball career stolen bases leaders
