= Tom McMillan (baseball) =

American baseball player (born 1951)

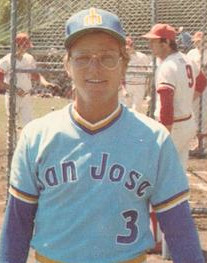
- McMillan in 1978 as a member of the San Jose Missions
- Shortstop
- Born: September 13, 1951 (age 74); Richmond, Virginia, U.S.
- Batted: Right Threw: Right

MLB debut
- September 17, 1977, for the Seattle Mariners

Last MLB appearance
- September 21, 1977, for the Seattle Mariners

MLB statistics
- At-bats: 5
- Hits: 0
- Stats at Baseball Reference

Teams
- Seattle Mariners (1977)

Thomas Erwin McMillan (born September 13, 1951) is an American former professional baseball player whose career spanned seven seasons, including one in Major League Baseball with the Seattle Mariners (1977). As a member of the inaugural Mariners team, McMillan, a shortstop, went hitless in five at-bats. The majority of his career was spent in the minor leagues. After he was drafted out of Jacksonville University by the Cleveland Indians during the 1973 Major League Baseball draft, McMillan made his professional debut that year with the Double-A San Antonio Brewers.

Over his minor league career, McMillan played with the Double-A San Antonio Brewers (1973), Triple-A Oklahoma City 89ers (1973–75), the Triple-A Toledo Mud Hens (1976), the Triple-A Iowa Oaks (1976), the Triple-A New Orleans Pelicans (1977), the Triple-A Rochester Red Wings (1977), the Triple-A San Jose Missions (1977), and the Double-A Buffalo Bisons (1978). In 711 minor league career games, McMillan batted .252 with 591 hits, 74 doubles, 24 triples, and 10 home runs.

== Early life ==
McMillan was born on September 13, 1951, in Richmond, Virginia. He attended Jacksonville University from 1970 to 1973, where he played college baseball for the Dolphins under head coach Barry Myers. McMillan played shortstop on the school's baseball team. In the winter of 1972, McMillan played with the United States national baseball team during the Amateur World Series in Managua, Nicaragua. During the series, he batted .308 with 20 hits, 15 runs, five doubles and six stolen bases. The U.S. team went on to place second. McMillan was the only member of the U.S. team to win All-World honors. After the 1972 season, he played collegiate summer baseball with the Chatham A's of the Cape Cod Baseball League and was named a league all-star. During his senior season, McMillan batted .305 with 57 hits, four home runs, and 28 stolen bases. He set a school record for career stolen bases with 141, almost doubling the previous record. During the second round of the 1973 Major League Baseball draft, McMillan was drafted by the Cleveland Indians.

== Professional career ==
=== 1973–76 seasons ===
After being drafted by the Cleveland Indians in 1973, McMillan made his professional baseball debut that season in the Indians minor league organization, playing with the Double-A San Antonio Brewers of the Texas League. With San Antonio, he batted .231 with 13 runs scored, 24 hits, two doubles, four runs batted in (RBIs), and five stolen bases in 44 games played. That year, McMillan also played 10 games at the Triple-A level, with the Oklahoma City 89ers. In those games, McMillan batted .316 with 12 hits in 38 at-bats. With both team, he was used as a shortstop defensively. In 1974, McMillan played the entire season with the Oklahoma City 89ers. He batted .258 with 59 runs scored, 115 hits, 11 doubles, five triples, one home run, 37 RBIs, and 12 stolen bases in 128 games played. All of his 127 games in the field were spent at the shortstop position.

McMillan continued playing with the Oklahoma City 89ers of the American Association in 1975. That season, he batted .249 with 66 runs scored, 125 hits, 14 doubles, five triples, two home runs, 58 RBIs, and 14 stolen bases in 136 games played. McMillan's final season in the Cleveland Indians minor league organization was during the 1976 season when he played with the Triple-A Toledo Mud Hens of the International League. With the Mud Hens, he batted .243 with 57 runs scored, 91 hits, 11 doubles, five triples, three home runs, 40 RBIs, and 13 stolen bases in 107 games played. That season, McMillan joined the Chicago White Sox organization in an unknown transaction. Upon joining their organization, he was assigned to play with the Triple-A Iowa Oaks of the American Association. In 23 games played with the Oaks, McMillan batted .207 with 13 runs scored, 17 hits, one triple, one RBI, and one stolen base. Between the two clubs, he played 129 defensive games at the shortstop position.

=== 1977 season ===
During the 1976 Major League Baseball expansion draft, McMillan was selected by the Seattle Mariners. Before the start of the 1977 season, the Mariners sent him to the Triple-A Rochester Red Wings. Rochester was affiliated with the Baltimore Orioles, but the Mariners did not have a Triple-A affiliate at the time. With the Red Wings, McMillan batted .274 with 12 runs scored, 26 hits, three doubles, two triples, and 12 RBIs in 39 games played. Defensively, McMillan played 21 games at second base, 17 games at shortstop, and three games at third base. He was then transferred to the Triple-A New Orleans Pelicans, who were affiliated with the St. Louis Cardinals at the time. In 24 games with New Orleans, McMillan batted .260 with seven runs scored, 13 hits, three doubles, one triple, and two RBIs. In the field, he played 14 games at shortstop and six games at second base.

McMillan was a September call-up for the Mariners in 1977. He made his debut in Major League Baseball (MLB) on September 17, against the Kansas City Royals at Kaufman Stadium. In that game, he did not have a plate appearance. At the time of his debut, he became the first attendee of Jacksonville University to make an MLB debut. His offensive debut would come on September 21, against the Milwaukee Brewers at County Stadium. In five at-bats, McMillan went hitless. It would prove to be his final MLB game. Defensively during his two games with the Mariners, McMillan played shortstop, committing no errors, while making one assist and two putouts.

=== Later career ===
In 1978, McMillan played the entire season in the minor leagues with the San Jose Missions, who were the Seattle Mariners Triple-A affiliate at the time. With the Missions, McMillan batted .256 with 38 runs scored, 83 hits, 13 doubles, three triples, one home run, 27 RBIs, and 21 stolen bases. In the field, he played 90 games at shortstop, three games in the outfield, and two games at second base. He was traded along with Enrique Romo and Rick Jones from the Mariners to the Pittsburgh Pirates for Mario Mendoza, Odell Jones and Rafael Vásquez at the Winter Meetings on December 5, 1978. McMillan's final season in professional baseball came in 1979, as a member of the Pirates' Double-A affiliate, the Buffalo Bisons. With the Bisons, who were in the Eastern League, McMillan batted .254 with 49 runs scored, 85 hits, 14 doubles, two triples, three home runs, 35 RBIs, and 12 stolen bases in 97 games played. McMillan played 90 games at shortstop, and another seven at second base.
