= Senior Professional Baseball Association =

League in Florida, US (1989–1990)

- Sport: Baseball
- Founded: 1989
- Folded: 1990
- No. of teams: 10
- Country: United States
- Last champion: St. Petersburg Pelicans

The Senior Professional Baseball Association, referred to commonly as the Senior League, was a winter baseball league based in Florida for players age 35 and over, with a minimum age of 32 for catchers. The league began play in 1989 and had eight teams in two divisions and a 72-game schedule. Pitchers Rollie Fingers, Ferguson Jenkins (both future Hall of Famers), and Vida Blue, outfielder Dave Kingman, and managers Earl Weaver and Dick Williams were the league's marquee names; and former big league outfielder Curt Flood was the circuit's first Commissioner. At age 54, Ed Rakow was the league's oldest player.

== First season ==
Throughout the inaugural season, most clubs struggled with poor attendance, with an average attendance of less than 1,000 per game. On the field, the West Palm Beach Tropics ran away with the league's South Division, finishing 15 games ahead of the second place Fort Myers Sun Sox. In the North, the St. Petersburg Pelicans finished in first, and the Bradenton Explorers were second, narrowly holding off the Orlando Juice.

Infielder Ron Washington of West Palm Beach was the league's offensive star, hitting .359 with a league leading 73 RBIs and winning the MVP award. Washington's teammate Mickey Rivers hit .366, and Gold Coast Sun Bert Campaneris, the oldest everyday player in the league at 47, stole 16 bases. Bradenton's Jim Morrison hit .290 with 55 RBIs and led the league with 17 homers. Tim Ireland of Fort Myers hit a league best .374, and his teammate Kim Allen paced the circuit with 33 stolen bases. Willie Aikens hit 12 home runs and had 58 RBIs. West Palm Beach pitcher Juan Eichelberger went 11–5 with a 2.90 earned run average (ERA), and St. Petersburg's Milt Wilcox went 12–3. Jon Matlack, Tim Stoddard, and Pete Falcone each won 10 games. Bradenton's Rick Lysander saved 11 games, and Winter Haven's Bill Campbell notched 5 saves to go along with a 2.12 ERA. Joaquín Andújar of Gold Coast had 5 wins and an ERA of 1.31.

In the first weekend of February 1990, the league's top four teams participated in a three-game, single elimination tournament with a rather unusual format. On February 2, the league's second place clubs faced off. The Explorers defeated the Sun Sox for a chance to face the St. Petersburg Pelicans. The next day, the Pelicans beat the Explorers 9–2 to advance to the league championship game against the West Palm Beach Tropics. On February 4, 1990, the Pelicans, powered by Lamar Johnson's home run and 3 RBIs, beat the Tropics 12–4 for the league's first championship.

The 1989-90 player statistics for all teams were published in the Sporting News on February 12, 1990, pages 30–31 "Assessing the Boys of Winter".

1989/1990 Teams

Northern Division

- St. Petersburg Pelicans (42–30, 1st Place)
- Bradenton Explorers (38–34, 2nd Place)
- Orlando Juice (37–35, 3rd Place)
- Winter Haven Super Sox (29–43, 4th Place)

Southern Division

- West Palm Beach Tropics (52–20, 1st Place)
- Fort Myers Sun Sox (37–35, 2nd Place)
- Gold Coast Suns (32–39, 3rd Place)
- St. Lucie Legends (20–51, 4th Place)

== Second season ==
For its second season, four of the league's eight teams (Gold Coast, Orlando, St. Lucie, and Winter Haven) folded; the West Palm Beach Tropics became a traveling team known as the Florida Tropics, and the Explorers moved from Bradenton to Daytona Beach, becoming the Daytona Beach Explorers. The circuit then added clubs in Arizona, the Sun City Rays, as well as in California, the San Bernardino Pride. In addition, the league dropped the minimum age to 34 and shortened the season to 56 games. Less than halfway through its second season, the SPBA folded on December 26, 1990.

1990/1991 Standings

- St. Petersburg Pelicans (15–8)
- Sun City Rays (13–9)
- San Bernardino Pride (13–12)
- Daytona Beach Explorers (11–12)
- Fort Myers Sun Sox (11–14)
- Florida Tropics (7–15)

Ron Washington, Joaquín Andújar, Paul Mirabella, Danny Boone, and Ozzie Virgil Jr. signed Major League Baseball contracts after playing in the Senior League; Mirabella, Boone, and Virgil all played in the Majors after their appearances in the SPBA.
