= 1979 California League season =

- League: California League
- Sport: Baseball
- Duration: April 12 – August 31
- Games: 140
- Teams: 10

Regular season
- League champions: San Jose Missions
- Season MVP: Mike Marshall, Lodi Dodgers; Les Pearsey, Visalia Oaks

Playoffs
- League champions: San Jose Missions
- Runners-up: Stockton Ports

CALL seasons
- ← 1978 1980 →

The 1979 California League was a Class A baseball season played between April 12 and August 31. Ten teams played a 140-game schedule, as the winner of each half of the season qualifying for the playoffs.

The San Jose Missions won the California League championship, as they defeated the Stockton Ports in the final round of the playoffs.

== Team changes ==
- The San Jose Missions joined the league as an expansion team and joined the South Division. The club began an affiliation with the Seattle Mariners.
- The Santa Clara Padres joined the league as an expansion team and joined the North Division.
- The Stockton Mariners ended their affiliation with the Seattle Mariners and began a new affiliation with the Milwaukee Brewers. The club was renamed to the Stockton Ports.

== Teams ==
1979 California League
Division	Team	City	MLB Affiliate	Stadium
North	Lodi Dodgers	Lodi, California	Los Angeles Dodgers	Lawrence Park
North	Modesto A's	Modesto, California	Oakland Athletics	Del Webb Field
North	Reno Silver Sox	Reno, Nevada	San Diego Padres	Moana Stadium
North	Santa Clara Padres	Santa Clara, California	None	Washington Park
North	Stockton Ports	Stockton, California	Milwaukee Brewers	Billy Hebert Field
South	Bakersfield Outlaws	Bakersfield, California	None	Sam Lynn Ballpark
South	Fresno Giants	Fresno, California	San Francisco Giants	John Euless Park
South	Salinas Angels	Salinas, California	California Angels	Salinas Municipal Stadium
South	San Jose Missions	San Jose, California	Seattle Mariners	San Jose Municipal Stadium
South	Visalia Oaks	Visalia, California	Minnesota Twins	Recreation Park

== Map of teams ==
North Division South Division

== Regular season ==
=== Summary ===
- The San Jose Missions finished with the best record in the regular season for the first time in club history.
- Despite finishing with the best record in the North Division, the Reno Silver Sox failed to qualify for the post-season, as they did not finish in first place in either half of the season.
- The Stockton Ports defeated the Reno Silver Sox in a tie-breaking game to win the North Division in the second half of the season.

=== Standings ===
North Division
Team	Win	Loss	%	GB
Reno Silver Sox	74	67	.525	–
Stockton Ports	73	68	.518	1
Lodi Dodgers	67	72	.482	6
Modesto A's	66	74	.471	7.5
Santa Clara Padres	47	93	.336	26.5
South Division
Team	Win	Loss	%	GB
San Jose Missions	89	51	.636	–
Visalia Oaks	86	54	.614	3
Salinas Angels	69	71	.493	20
Fresno Giants	66	73	.475	22.5
Bakersfield Outlaws	63	77	.450	26

== League Leaders ==
=== Batting leaders ===
Stat	Player	Total
AVG	Mike Marshall, Lodi Dodgers	.354
H	Mike Marshall, Lodi Dodgers	186
R	Les Pearsey, Visalia Oaks	111
2B	Mike Marshall, Lodi Dodgers	37
3B	Eddie Brunson, Stockton Ports	10
HR	Mark Funderburk, Visalia Oaks	31
RBI	Les Pearsey, Visalia Oaks	121
SB	Alfred Weston, San Jose Missions	66

=== Pitching leaders ===
Stat	Player	Total
W	Steve Green, Visalia Oaks	16
ERA	Steve Brown, Salinas Angels	2.41
CG	Dave LaPoint, Stockton Ports; Rick Steirer, Salinas Angels	11
SHO	Glenn Fisher, Fresno Giants; Brian Holton, Lodi Dodgers; Dave LaPoint, Stockton Ports; Ronald McGee, San Jose Missions; Doug Smith, San Jose Missions	3
SV	Clyde Reichard, Visalia Oaks	19
IP	Steve Green, Visalia Oaks	208.0
SO	Dave LaPoint, Stockton Ports	208

== Playoffs ==
- The San Jose Missions won their first California League championship, as they defeated the Stockton Ports in five games.

=== Playoff bracket ===
Divisional finals
N1	Lodi	0
N2	Stockton	2
S1	Visalia	1
S2	San Jose	2

Finals
N2	Stockton	2
S2	San Jose	3

== Awards ==
California League awards
Award name	Recipient
Most Valuable Player	Mike Marshall, Lodi Dodgers; Les Pearsey, Visalia Oaks

== See also ==
- 1979 Major League Baseball season
