= 1978 California League season =

- League: California League
- Sport: Baseball
- Duration: April 13 – August 31
- Games: 140
- Teams: 8

Regular season
- League champions: Visalia Oaks
- Season MVP: Steve Douglas, Visalia Oaks

Playoffs
- League champions: Visalia Oaks
- Runners-up: Lodi Dodgers

CALL seasons
- ← 1977 1979 →

The 1978 California League was a Class A baseball season played between April 13 and August 31. Eight teams played a 140-game schedule, as the winner of each half of the season qualifying for the playoffs.

The Visalia Oaks won the California League championship, as they defeated the Lodi Dodgers in the final round of the playoffs.

== League changes ==
- The California League split into two divisions beginning in 1978. The divisions were the North Division and the South Division.

== Team changes ==
- The Bakersfield Outlaws joined the league as an expansion team and joined the South Division.
- The Stockton Mariners joined the league as an expansion and joined the North Division. The club began an affiliation with the Seattle Mariners.

== Teams ==
1978 California League
Division	Team	City	MLB Affiliate	Stadium
North	Lodi Dodgers	Lodi, California	Los Angeles Dodgers	Lawrence Park
North	Modesto A's	Modesto, California	Oakland Athletics	Del Webb Field
North	Reno Silver Sox	Reno, Nevada	San Diego Padres	Moana Stadium
North	Stockton Mariners	Stockton, California	Seattle Mariners	Billy Hebert Field
South	Bakersfield Outlaws	Bakersfield, California	None	Sam Lynn Ballpark
South	Fresno Giants	Fresno, California	San Francisco Giants	John Euless Park
South	Salinas Angels	Salinas, California	California Angels	Salinas Municipal Stadium
South	Visalia Oaks	Visalia, California	Minnesota Twins	Recreation Park

== Map of teams ==
North Division South Division

== Regular season ==
=== Summary ===
- The Visalia Oaks finished with the best record in the regular season for the first time since 1957.

=== Standings ===
North Division
Team	Win	Loss	%	GB
Lodi Dodgers	85	55	.607	–
Stockton Mariners	63	77	.450	22
Reno Silver Sox	62	78	.443	23
Modesto A's	61	79	.436	24
South Division
Team	Win	Loss	%	GB
Visalia Oaks	97	42	.698	–
Salinas Angels	84	56	.600	13.5
Fresno Giants	59	80	.424	38
Bakersfield Outlaws	48	92	.343	49.5

== League Leaders ==
=== Batting leaders ===
Stat	Player	Total
AVG	Joe Charboneau, Visalia Oaks	.350
H	Steve Douglas, Visalia Oaks	192
R	Steve Douglas, Visalia Oaks	142
2B	Scott Ullger, Visalia Oaks	36
3B	Steve Douglas, Visalia Oaks	17
HR	Steven McManaman, Visalia Oaks	29
RBI	Steven McManaman, Visalia Oaks	120
SB	Richard Brewster, Salinas Angels	70

=== Pitching leaders ===
Stat	Player	Total
W	Gene Robinson, Visalia Oaks; Bob Veselic, Visalia Oaks	18
ERA	Jim Lewis, Stockton Mariners	2.12
CG	Bud Anderson, Stockton Mariners	16
SHO	Dave Beard, Modesto A's; Jim Lewis, Stockton Mariners	5
SV	Mickey Lashley, Lodi Dodgers	17
IP	Jim Lewis, Stockton Mariners	212.0
SO	Jim Lewis, Stockton Mariners	189

== Playoffs ==
- The playoffs expanded to two rounds, as a best-of-three divisional final was added.
- Both the Lodi Dodgers and Visalia Oaks finished in first place in each half of the season, therefore earning byes to the finals.
- The Visalia Oaks won their second California League championship, as they defeated the Lodi Dodgers in five games.

=== Playoff bracket ===
Divisional finals
N1	Lodi	bye
S1	Visalia	bye

Finals
N1	Lodi	2
S1	Visalia	3

== Awards ==
California League awards
Award name	Recipient
Most Valuable Player	Steve Douglas, Visalia Oaks

== See also ==
- 1978 Major League Baseball season
