= 1980 California League season =

- League: California League
- Sport: Baseball
- Duration: April 10 – August 31
- Games: 140
- Teams: 9

Regular season
- League champions: Stockton Ports
- Season MVP: Jaime Cocanower, Stockton Ports; Candy Maldonado, Lodi Dodgers

Playoffs
- League champions: Stockton Ports
- Runners-up: Visalia Oaks

CALL seasons
- ← 1979 1981 →

The 1980 California League was a Class A baseball season played between April 10 and August 31. Nine teams played a 140-game schedule, as the winner of each half of the season qualifying for the playoffs.

The Stockton Ports won the California League championship, as they defeated the Visalia Oaks in the final round of the playoffs.

== Team changes ==
- The Bakersfield Outlaws disbanded operations.
- The Santa Clara Padres relocated to Rohnert Park, California and were renamed to the Redwood Pioneers. The team remained in the North Division.

== Teams ==
1980 California League
Division	Team	City	MLB Affiliate	Stadium
North	Lodi Dodgers	Lodi, California	Los Angeles Dodgers	Lawrence Park
North	Modesto A's	Modesto, California	Oakland Athletics	Del Webb Field
North	Redwood Pioneers	Rohnert Park, California	None	Rohnert Park Stadium
North	Reno Silver Sox	Reno, Nevada	San Diego Padres	Moana Stadium
North	Stockton Ports	Stockton, California	Milwaukee Brewers	Billy Hebert Field
South	Fresno Giants	Fresno, California	San Francisco Giants	John Euless Park
South	Salinas Angels	Salinas, California	California Angels	Salinas Municipal Stadium
South	San Jose Missions	San Jose, California	Seattle Mariners	San Jose Municipal Stadium
South	Visalia Oaks	Visalia, California	Minnesota Twins	Recreation Park

== Map of teams ==
North Division South Division

== Regular season ==
=== Summary ===
- The Stockton Ports finished with the best record in the regular season for the first time since 1969.
- Alan Wiggins of the Lodi Dodgers set a professional baseball single-season record with 120 stolen bases.

=== Standings ===
North Division
Team	Win	Loss	%	GB
Stockton Ports	90	51	.638	–
Modesto A's	74	65	.532	15
Reno Silver Sox	75	66	.532	15
Lodi Dodgers	57	83	.407	32.5
Redwood Pioneers	55	85	.393	34.5
South Division
Team	Win	Loss	%	GB
Fresno Giants	74	66	.529	–
San Jose Missions	73	66	.525	0.5
Visalia Oaks	71	69	.507	3
Salinas Angels	61	79	.436	13

== League Leaders ==
=== Batting leaders ===
Stat	Player	Total
AVG	John Flammang, San Jose Missions	.348
H	Ed Irvine, Stockton Ports	177
R	Bobby Garrett, Modesto A's	117
2B	James Durrman, Modesto A's	33
3B	Al Chambers, San Jose Missions	12
HR	Greg Brock, Lodi Dodgers	29
RBI	Candy Maldonado, Lodi Dodgers	102
SB	Alan Wiggins, Lodi Dodgers	120

=== Pitching leaders ===
Stat	Player	Total
W	Scott Stranski, San Jose Missions	18
ERA	Mike Madden, Stockton Ports	1.95
CG	Brad Havens, Visalia Oaks	12
SHO	Scott Stranski, San Jose Missions	4
SV	Phillip Hinrichs, Fresno Giants; Tim O'Neill, Lodi Dodgers	13
IP	Jaime Cocanower, Stockton Ports; Scott Stranski, San Jose Missions	198.0
SO	Brad Havens, Visalia Oaks	179

== Playoffs ==
- The Stockton Ports won their sixth California League championship, as they defeated the Visalia Oaks in three games.

=== Playoff bracket ===
Divisional finals
N1	Stockton	bye
S1	Fresno	1
S2	Visalia	2

Finals
N1	Stockton	3
S2	Visalia	0

== Awards ==
California League awards
Award name	Recipient
Most Valuable Player	Jaime Cocanower, Stockton Ports; Candy Maldonado, Lodi Dodgers

== See also ==
- 1980 Major League Baseball season
