= Rudy Árias (catcher) =

Cuban baseball player and coach (born 1957)

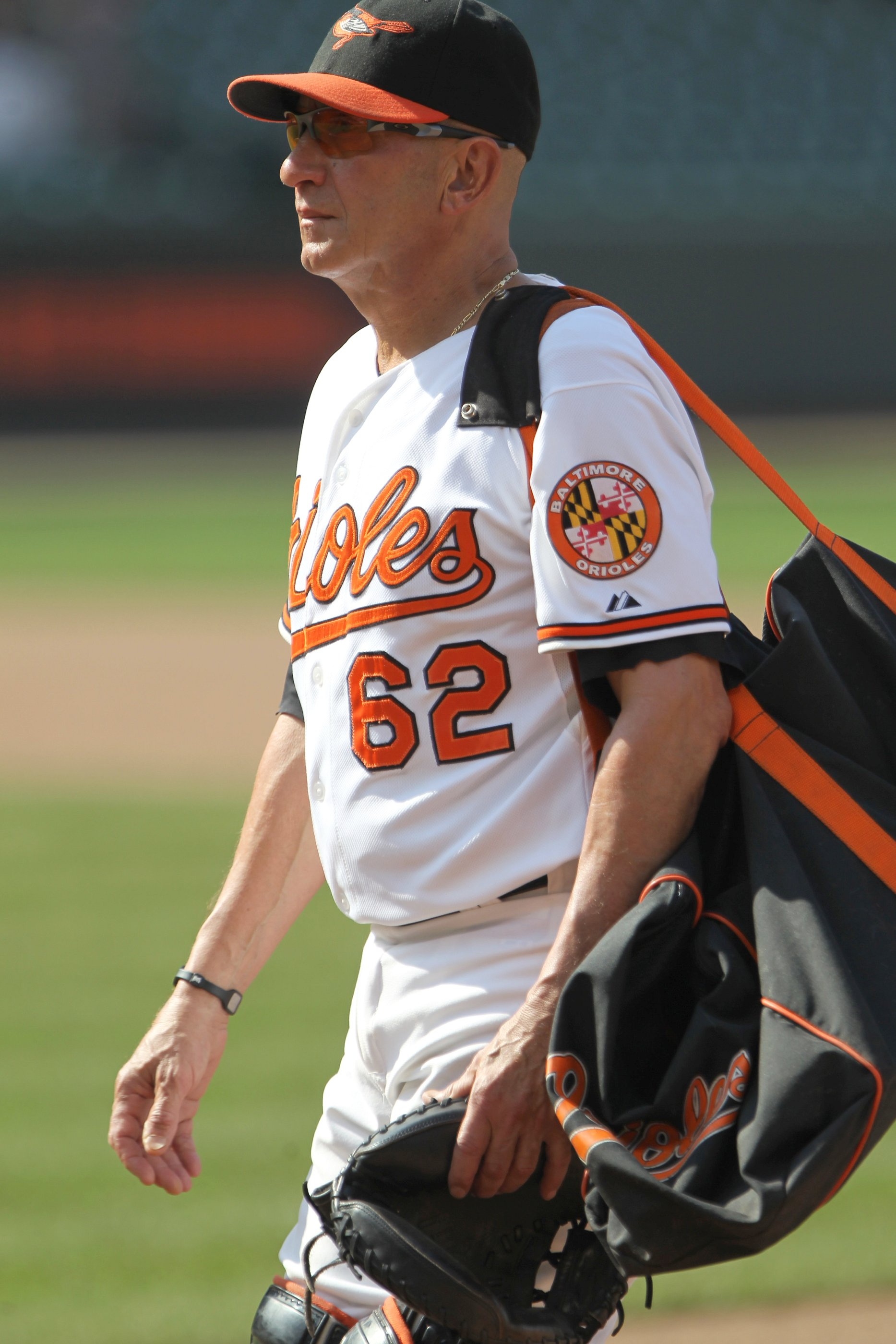
- Árias with the Orioles
- Catcher / Coach
- Born: June 25, 1957 (age 69); Santa Clara, Cuba
- Bats: Right Throws: Right
- Stats at Baseball Reference

Rodolfo M. Árias (born June 25, 1957) is a Cuban former minor league baseball catcher and former Major League Baseball coach. He served as the bullpen catcher for the Baltimore Orioles of Major League Baseball. He has also served in this capacity for the Florida Marlins and New York Yankees. His father is Rudy Árias.

== Biography ==
Born in Santa Clara, Cuba, Árias attended Miami Senior High School. He played minor league baseball for the Seattle Mariners organization. Árias played for the Bellingham Mariners of the Rookie-level Northwest League in 1977, where he was named the league's defensive player of the month for July, and was named to the All-Star team. However, he had a batting average of only .225. Árias played for the Stockton Mariners of the Class A California League in 1978. After a strong start, Árias missed time due to a broken jaw suffered when he was hit in the face with a fastball. In 1979, he played for the Alexandria Mariners of the Class A Carolina League, the San Jose Missions, and Santa Clara Padres, both in the California League. He retired as a player following the season.

Árias served as the bullpen catcher for the Florida Marlins of the National League in the mid-1990s and the New York Yankees of the American League (AL), serving with the team during the 1996 World Series championship. Árias was a replacement player for the Yankees during the 1994–95 Major League Baseball strike.

Árias then worked for the Baltimore Orioles of the AL as their bullpen catcher from 1997 through 2007. He coached the Winnipeg Goldeyes, then of the Northern League from 2008 through 2010. He left the Goldeyes to return to the Orioles as their bullpen catcher in 2011. He served as the Orioles' bullpen catcher through the 2015 season.

He was inducted into the Miami Senior High School Hall of Fame in April 2012.

== Personal ==
His family fled Cuba in 1962. His father is Rudy Árias, who pitched for the Chicago White Sox. His son, Alex Árias, played college baseball at Howard University. Arias became a citizen of the United States in March 2012.
