= List of Tampa Bay Rays managers =

The Tampa Bay Rays are a professional baseball franchise based in St. Petersburg, Florida. They are a member of the American League (AL) East in Major League Baseball (MLB). The team joined MLB in 1998 as an expansion team with the Arizona Diamondbacks. In November 2007, Rays owner Stuart Sternberg renamed his team from the "Tampa Bay Devil Rays" to the "Tampa Bay Rays", which he described as "A beacon that radiates throughout Tampa Bay and across the entire state of Florida." The Rays have won three American League Championships, first in 2008, again in 2020, and most recently in 2026. The Rays have played their home games at Tropicana Field since their inaugural season. Andrew Friedman was the Vice President of Baseball operations from 2004 through 2014, in essence the general manager.

There have been five managers for the Rays franchise. The team's first manager was Larry Rothschild, the only manager who have spent his entire MLB managing career with the Devil Rays and managed the team for four seasons. Through the end of the 2014 season, Joe Maddon was the franchise's all-time leader for the most regular-season games managed with 1,459 and the most regular-season game wins with 754. Maddon was the first manager to have been to the playoffs with the Rays. In 2008, he took them all the way to the World Series, losing to the Philadelphia Phillies in five games. Maddon is the first manager to have won the Manager of the Year Award with the Rays, first winning it in 2008, and again in 2011. Maddon became the manager of the then-Devil Rays in 2006. On February 15, 2012, the Rays extended his contract through the 2015 season, however he opted out of his contract at the end of the 2014 season. Kevin Cash has been the team's manager since the 2015 season. In 2019 the team reached the playoffs, losing in the Division Series in five games. In 2020, they advanced to the World Series, however they lost in six games. Cash, the manager with the highest regular-season winning percentage with .537, won the AL Manager of the Year Award in 2020 to become the second manager in Rays history to win the award. He then won the award the following year to be the first Rays manager to win the award in consecutive years. On May 4, 2024, Cash became the franchise leader by getting his 755th career win over the New York Mets.

== Table key ==
WPct	Winning percentage: number of wins divided by number of games managed
PA	Playoff appearances: number of years this manager has led the franchise to the playoffs
PW	Playoff wins: number of wins this manager has accrued in the playoffs
PL	Playoff losses: number of losses this manager has accrued in the playoffs
WS	World Series: number of World Series victories achieved by this manager
*	Spent entire MLB managing career with the (Devil) Rays

== Managers ==
Note: Statistics are correct through August 8, 2026

#	Image	Manager	Seasons	Wins	Losses	WPct	PA	PW	PL	WS	Reference(s)
1		Larry Rothschild*	1998–2001	205	294	.411	—	—	—	—	—
2		Hal McRae	2001–2002	113	196	.366	—	—	—	—	—
3		Lou Piniella	2003–2005	200	285	.412	—	—	—	—	—
4		Joe Maddon	2006–2014	754	705	.517	4	12	17	0	AL Manager of the Year (2008, 2011); 2008 AL champion
5		Kevin Cash*	2015–present	994	848	.540	6	19	20	0	AL Manager of the Year (2020, 2021); 2020 AL champion

== Notes ==
- ^{a} A running total of the number of managers of the (Devil) Rays. Thus, any manager who has two or more separate terms as a manager is only counted once.
- ^{b} Each year is linked to an article about that particular MLB season.
