= Bud Anderson (baseball) =

American baseball player (born 1956)

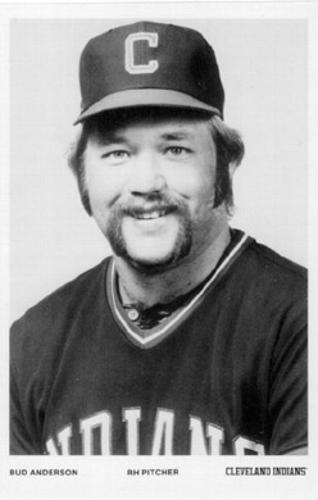
- Relief pitcher
- Born: May 27, 1956 (age 70); Westbury, New York, U.S.
- Batted: Right Threw: Right

MLB debut
- June 11, 1982, for the Cleveland Indians

Last MLB appearance
- October 2, 1983, for the Cleveland Indians

MLB statistics
- Win–loss record: 4–10
- Earned run average: 3.68
- Strikeouts: 76
- Stats at Baseball Reference

Teams
- Cleveland Indians (1982–1983)

Karl Adam "Bud" Anderson (born May 27, 1956) is an American former professional relief pitcher in Major League Baseball.

Anderson attended Rutgers University where he played baseball and football for the Scarlet Knights. He was drafted by the Seattle Mariners in the third round of the 1977 amateur draft out of Rutgers. Anderson spent three seasons in the Seattle Mariners organization. In 1977, he played for the Bellingham Mariners, going 5–3 in 10 starts. In 1978, he pitched for the Stockton Mariners and went 12–8. In 1979, he spent most of the season with the Spokane Indians, and had a 2–13 record.

The Seattle Mariners traded Anderson to the Cleveland Indians on March 29, 1980, to complete an earlier trade. He made his major league debut on June 11, 1982, with the Indians. On that day, Anderson pitched three scoreless innings in relief. Despite having a 3.35 earned run average, Anderson posted a win–loss record of 3–4. Anderson's team went on to finish tied for sixth in their division. In 1983, Anderson had a 4.08 earned run average. On the day of his final major league appearance, October 2, he pitched three innings and allowed three earned runs.

At the time of his retirement Anderson had a 4–10 record, a 3.68 ERA, 62 walks, and 76 strikeouts.
