= Jim Lewis (1980s pitcher) =

American baseball player (born 1955)

- Pitcher
- Born: October 12, 1955 (age 70); Miami, Florida, U.S.
- Batted: Right Threw: Right

MLB debut
- September 12, 1979, for the Seattle Mariners

Last MLB appearance
- August 12, 1985, for the Seattle Mariners

MLB statistics
- Win–loss record: 0–1
- Earned run average: 8.77
- Strikeouts: 9
- Stats at Baseball Reference

Teams
- Seattle Mariners (1979, 1985); New York Yankees (1982); Minnesota Twins (1983)

James Martin Lewis (born October 12, 1955) is an American former professional baseball pitcher. He pitched in 11 games over four seasons in Major League Baseball for the Seattle Mariners, New York Yankees, and Minnesota Twins.

Lewis pitched in college baseball for the South Carolina Gamecocks, reaching the 1977 College World Series.

== Seattle Mariners ==
Lewis signed with the Mariners as an amateur free agent in June 1977 and played for the Bellingham Mariners that summer. With the Class A-Advanced Stockton Mariners in 1978, he was a California League All-Star. He made his MLB debut as a September call-up in 1979, pitching two innings over two games.

== New York Yankees ==
On November 1, 1979, Lewis and Ruppert Jones were traded to the Yankees for Rick Anderson, Jim Beattie, Juan Beniquez, and Jerry Narron. Lewis pitched in one game for the Yankees in 1982, allowing seven runs, three of them earned, in one inning. That year, he also led the International League with a 2.60 earned run average (ERA).

== Minnesota Twins ==
After the 1982 season, Lewis was drafted by the Minnesota Twins in the 1982 minor league draft. He played six games for them in 1983.

== Seattle Mariners (second stint) ==
On February 21, 1984, Lewis re-signed with the Mariners after becoming a free agent after the 1983 season. He took the loss, his only MLB decision, in his final game in August 1985. Seattle released him after that season.
