= Jon Debus =

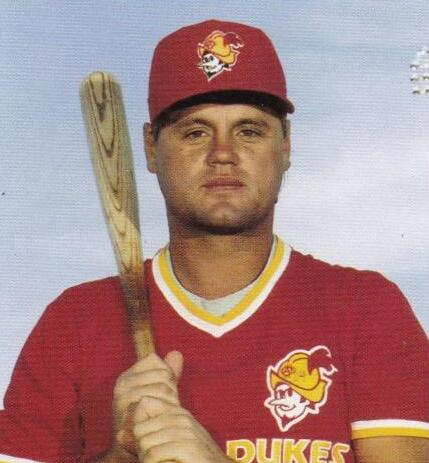
- Debus with the Albuquerque Dukes c. 1987
- Coach
- Born: August 31, 1958 (age 68); Chicago Heights, Illinois
- Bats: Right Throws: Right
- Stats at Baseball Reference

Teams
- As Coach: Los Angeles Dodgers (2005); New York Mets (2011)

Jon Debus (born August 31, 1958) is an American former Minor League Baseball catcher, first baseman, third baseman, outfielder, coach, and manager. In 2011, he served as bullpen coach for the New York Mets.

== Biography ==
Debus was originally drafted as an outfielder by the Los Angeles Dodgers in the 21st round of the 1980 MLB draft out of College of St. Francis. He played in the Dodgers minor league system from 1980-1989.

After his playing career ended, he became a coach and then a Manager in the Dodgers minor league system. He was also the General Manager of the Elmira Pioneers from 2000–2001, and the Minor League catching coordinator for the Dodgers from 2002–2004. After decades in the minors, Debus became bullpen coach for the Dodgers in 2005, manager Jim Tracy telling the Los Angeles Times on April 1, 2005, "It was time he was rewarded for his loyalty to the organization."

He was bullpen coach for the New York Mets during the 2011 season, but was not hired back for 2012 as he was replaced by Ricky Bones.

== Playing career ==
- Lethbridge Dodgers (1980)
- Vero Beach Dodgers (1981)
- Lodi Dodgers (1982-1983)
- San Antonio Dodgers (1983, 1985, 1987)
- Albuquerque Dukes (1983-1984, 1986-1989)

== Coaching career ==
- San Antonio Missions (1990)
- Vero Beach Dodgers (1991)
- Albuquerque Dukes (1997-1998)
- Vero Beach Dodgers (1999)
- Orix Buffaloes (2007-2008)

== Managing career ==
- Great Falls Dodgers (1992-1993)
- Vero Beach Dodgers (1994-1996)
