= Ken Bracey =

American baseball player, manager, and scout

Bracey

Kenneth Wayne Bracey (June 11, 1937 – December 12, 2017) was a minor league baseball pitcher, manager and big league scout.

== Playing career ==
Bracey pitched from 1956 to 1964. He spent 1956 in the New York Yankees organization, and the rest of his career in the New York Giants/San Francisco Giants organization. He was mostly a relief pitcher, appearing in 331 games and starting only 18 of them. Overall, he went 52-40 with a 3.51 ERA. Perhaps his best season was in 1961 with the Springfield Giants. That year, he went 9-5 with a 2.85 ERA in 53 relief appearances.

== Managerial career ==
Bracey served as a manager for the Lodi Padres for part of the 1970 season, replacing Sonny Ruberto. He served as manager of the Alexandria Aces for part of the 1974 season, replacing Jackie Brandt.

== Post playing/managing ==
Bracey worked for the San Diego Padres for 36 years, from their inaugural season onward. From 1997 to 2006, he served as a special assistant to General Manager Kevin Towers and from 2007-2013 he worked as a special assistant for Ned Colletti with the Los Angeles Dodgers. He has also worked as an amateur and professional scout.

== Death ==
Bracey died on December 12, 2017.
