= 1977 California League season =

- League: California League
- Sport: Baseball
- Duration: April 14 – August 31
- Games: 140
- Teams: 6

Regular season
- League champions: Fresno Giants
- Season MVP: Kelly Snider, Lodi Dodgers

Playoffs
- League champions: Lodi Dodgers
- Runners-up: Salinas Angels

CALL seasons
- ← 1976 1978 →

The 1977 California League was a Class A baseball season played between April 14 and August 31. Six teams played a 140-game schedule, as the winner of each half of the season qualified for the California League championship round.

The Lodi Dodgers won the California League championship, as they defeated the Salinas Angels in the final round of the playoffs.

== Team changes ==
- The San Jose Bees relocated to Visalia, California and were renamed to the Visalia Oaks. The club ended their affiliation with the Cleveland Indians and began a new affiliation with the Minnesota Twins.
- The Reno Silver Sox ended their shared affiliation with the Minnesota Twins. They continued their affiliation with the San Diego Padres.

== Teams ==
1977 California League
Team	City	MLB Affiliate	Stadium
Fresno Giants	Fresno, California	San Francisco Giants	John Euless Park
Lodi Dodgers	Lodi, California	Los Angeles Dodgers	Lawrence Park
Modesto A's	Modesto, California	Oakland Athletics	Del Webb Field
Reno Silver Sox	Reno, Nevada	San Diego Padres	Moana Stadium
Salinas Angels	Salinas, California	California Angels	Salinas Municipal Stadium
Visalia Oaks	Visalia, California	Minnesota Twins	Recreation Park

== Map of teams ==
California League Teams

== Regular season ==
=== Summary ===
- Despite finishing with the best overall record during the season, the Fresno Giants failed to qualify for the post-season as the club did not finish in first place in either half of the season.
- The Fresno Giants finished with the best record in the league for the first time since 1974.

=== Standings ===
California League
Team	Win	Loss	%	GB
Fresno Giants	83	57	.593	–
Lodi Dodgers	81	59	.579	2
Salinas Angels	79	61	.564	4
Visalia Oaks	75	65	.536	8
Reno Silver Sox	59	81	.421	24
Modesto A's	53	87	.379	30

== League Leaders ==
=== Batting leaders ===
Stat	Player	Total
AVG	Rudy Law, Lodi Dodgers	.386
H	Joe Strain, Fresno Giants	188
R	Jack Perconte, Lodi Dodgers	132
2B	Bill Ewing, Salinas Angels	35
3B	Dwight Adams, Reno Silver Sox	13
HR	Kelly Snider, Lodi Dodgers	36
RBI	Kelly Snider, Lodi Dodgers	139
SB	Rickey Henderson, Modesto A's	95

=== Pitching leaders ===
Stat	Player	Total
W	David Mendoza, Fresno Giants	16
ERA	John Henry Johnson, Fresno Giants	3.38
CG	David Mendoza, Fresno Giants	12
SHO	Ted Barnicle, Fresno Giants; David Mendoza, Fresno Giants; Mike Tennant, Lodi Dodgers	3
SV	Tom Tellmann, Reno Silver Sox	12
IP	David Mendoza, Fresno Giants	195.0
SO	Ted Barnicle, Fresno Giants	179

== Playoffs ==
- The Lodi Dodgers won their second California League championship, as they defeated the Salinas Angels in three games.

=== Playoff bracket ===
Finals
1	Salinas	0
2	Lodi	3

== Awards ==
California League awards
Award name	Recipient
Most Valuable Player	Kelly Snider, Lodi Dodgers

== See also ==
- 1977 Major League Baseball season
