= George Freese =

American baseball player (1926–2014)

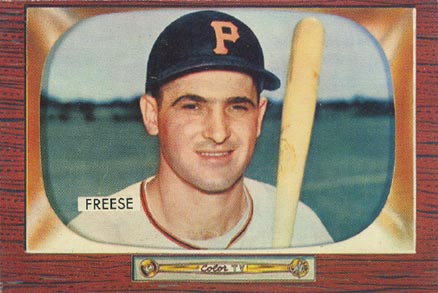
- Third baseman
- Born: September 12, 1926; Wheeling, West Virginia, U.S.
- Died: July 27, 2014 (aged 87); Portland, Oregon, U.S.
- Batted: Right Threw: Right

MLB debut
- April 29, 1953, for the Detroit Tigers

Last MLB appearance
- May 31, 1961, for the Chicago Cubs

MLB statistics
- Batting average: .257
- Home runs: 3
- Runs batted in: 23
- Stats at Baseball Reference

Teams
- Detroit Tigers (1953); Pittsburgh Pirates (1955); Chicago Cubs (1961)

George Walter Freese (September 12, 1926 – July 27, 2014) was an American third baseman in Major League Baseball. He played for the Detroit Tigers in 1953, Pittsburgh Pirates in 1955 and Chicago Cubs in 1961. Freese attended West Virginia University, where he played college baseball for the Mountaineers in 1947. While at West Virginia he was a member of Phi Sigma Kappa fraternity.

He was later a member of the Cubs coaching staff from 1964 to 1965 and a minor league manager in the California League for the Lodi Padres in 1971 and the Bakersfield Dodgers in 1973–1974.

The older brother of MLB third baseman Gene Freese, George Freese lived in Portland, Oregon, where he played three years of minor league baseball for the Portland Beavers. He was inducted into the Oregon Sports Hall of Fame in 2008.
