= Kevin Cash =

American baseball player and manager (born 1977)

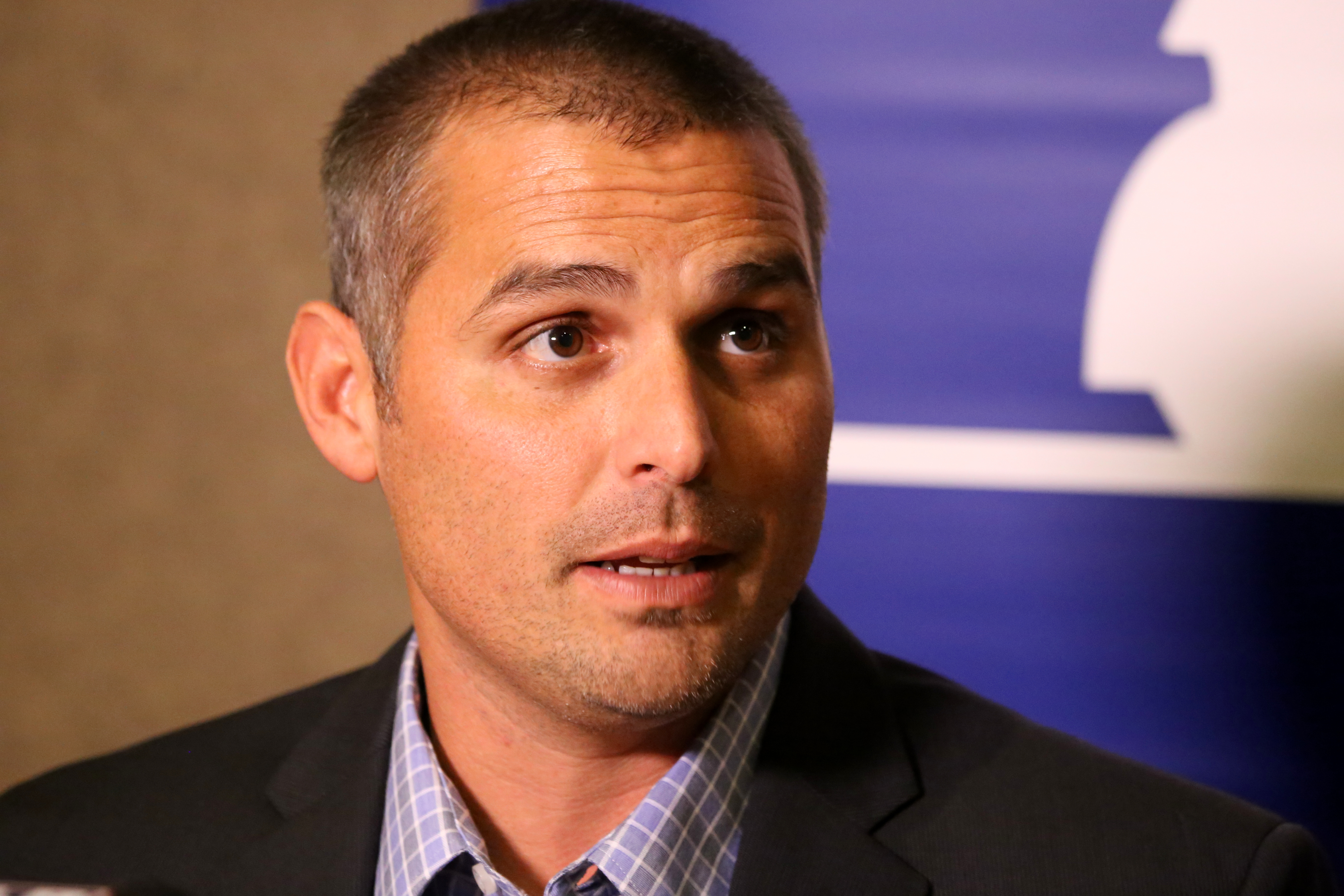
- Cash in 2015

Tampa Bay Rays – No. 16
- Catcher / Manager
- Born: December 6, 1977 (age 48); Tampa, Florida, U.S.
- Batted: Right Threw: Right

MLB debut
- September 6, 2002, for the Toronto Blue Jays

Last MLB appearance
- October 3, 2010, for the Boston Red Sox

MLB statistics (through September 27, 2026)
- Batting average: .183
- Home runs: 12
- Runs batted in: 58
- Managerial record: 994-848
- Winning %: .540
- Stats at Baseball Reference
- Managerial record at Baseball Reference

Teams
- As player: Toronto Blue Jays (2002); Tampa Bay Devil Rays (2005); Boston Red Sox (2007); New York Yankees (2009); Houston Astros (2010); Boston Red Sox (2010); As manager: Tampa Bay Rays (2015–present); As coach: Cleveland Indians (2013–2014)

Career highlights and awards
- 2× AL Manager of the Year (2020, 2021)

Kevin Forrest Cash (born December 6, 1977) is an American professional baseball manager and former player who is the manager of the Tampa Bay Rays of Major League Baseball (MLB). Previously, Cash played catcher in MLB for the Toronto Blue Jays, Tampa Bay Devil Rays, Boston Red Sox, New York Yankees, and Houston Astros. As a player, Cash was listed at 6 feet 0 inches (1.83 m) and 200 pounds (91 kg); he batted and threw right-handed. He was the bullpen coach for the Cleveland Indians before being hired as the Rays' manager in December 2014. Cash was the American League Manager of the Year in 2020 and 2021, the first AL manager to win the award consecutively. He entered the 2024 season as the longest-tenured manager in MLB. As of 2026 and still MLB’s longest tenured-manager, Cash has led the Rays to their second (2020) and third AL Pennants (2026), three AL East Division titles (2020, 2021, and 2026), and three AL Wild Card berths (2019, 2022, and 2023).

== Amateur career ==
Cash was a second baseman for Northside Little League in Tampa, Florida, on the team that reached the 1989 Little League World Series. He attended Gaither High School, but initially failed to make the Cowboys baseball team.

After graduating in 1996, he played college baseball for the Florida State Seminoles baseball team under head coach Mike Martin. While at Florida State, Cash started 148 games as an infielder. He batted .299 with a career on-base plus slugging (OPS) of .923. On February 26, 1998, he participated in the first-ever Tampa Bay Devil Rays game, an exhibition game against the Seminoles at Al Lang Field.

He also appeared in two College World Series (1998, 1999) for Florida State, including a second-place finish in 1999, when he was voted second-team All American at third base by the National Collegiate Baseball Writers Association (NCBWA). He was also named MVP of the Tallahassee Regional in the 1999 College World Series.

In the summer of 1999, he played for the Falmouth Commodores of the Cape Cod Baseball League. Cash volunteered to play catcher for Falmouth, and threw out two runners in his first inning behind the plate. He went on to earn league All-Star and team MVP honors.

== Professional career ==
=== Toronto Blue Jays ===
In August 1999, he signed with the Toronto Blue Jays as an undrafted free agent. Cash began his professional career with the Hagerstown Suns in the South Atlantic League. After primarily playing third base in college, he was told to learn how to catch. Cash was roommates with Josh Holliday. That year, he hit .245 with 10 home runs and 28 RBI in 59 games.

In 2001, Cash was a member of the Dunedin Blue Jays. His presence behind the plate, alongside Josh Phelps, led to Jayson Werth moving to the outfield that year. He Hit .283 with 12 homers in 105 games in High-A and threw out over 50 percent of base runners.

Cash was moved to Double-A for the 2002 season. During his time with the Tennessee Smokies, he hit .277 with eight home runs and a league-leading 44 RBI while also throwing out 42 percent of base runners. Cash was promoted to Triple-A in June. He hit .220 with 10 home runs and 26 RBI in 67 games for the Syracuse SkyChiefs, before getting called up to the majors in September. He made his major league debut on September 6 and collected his first hit on September 11.

Cash started the 2003 season back in Triple-A, where he hit .270 with eight home runs and 37 RBI in 93 games. He also participated in the All-Star Futures Game. On August 11, Cash was promoted to the majors. He hit his first major league home run on September 27.

In 2004, Cash was the starting catcher to begin the season until he went on the disabled list in May. He was then usurped by Gregg Zaun, who hit well in his absence. Cash ultimately hit .193 while throwing out 44 percent of base runners in 60 games that year.

=== Tampa Bay Devil Rays ===
On December 12, 2004, Cash was traded to the then-Tampa Bay Devil Rays for pitcher Chad Gaudin. He began the season on the disabled list with a shoulder injury, but returned to the majors in June and hit a home run on the first pitch of his first at-bat. He hit just .161 in 13 games and was optioned to Triple-A on July 22.

On April 5, 2006, Cash was designated for assignment by Tampa Bay. He cleared waivers and was outrighted to the Durham Bulls, where he spent the entire 2006 season.

=== Boston Red Sox ===
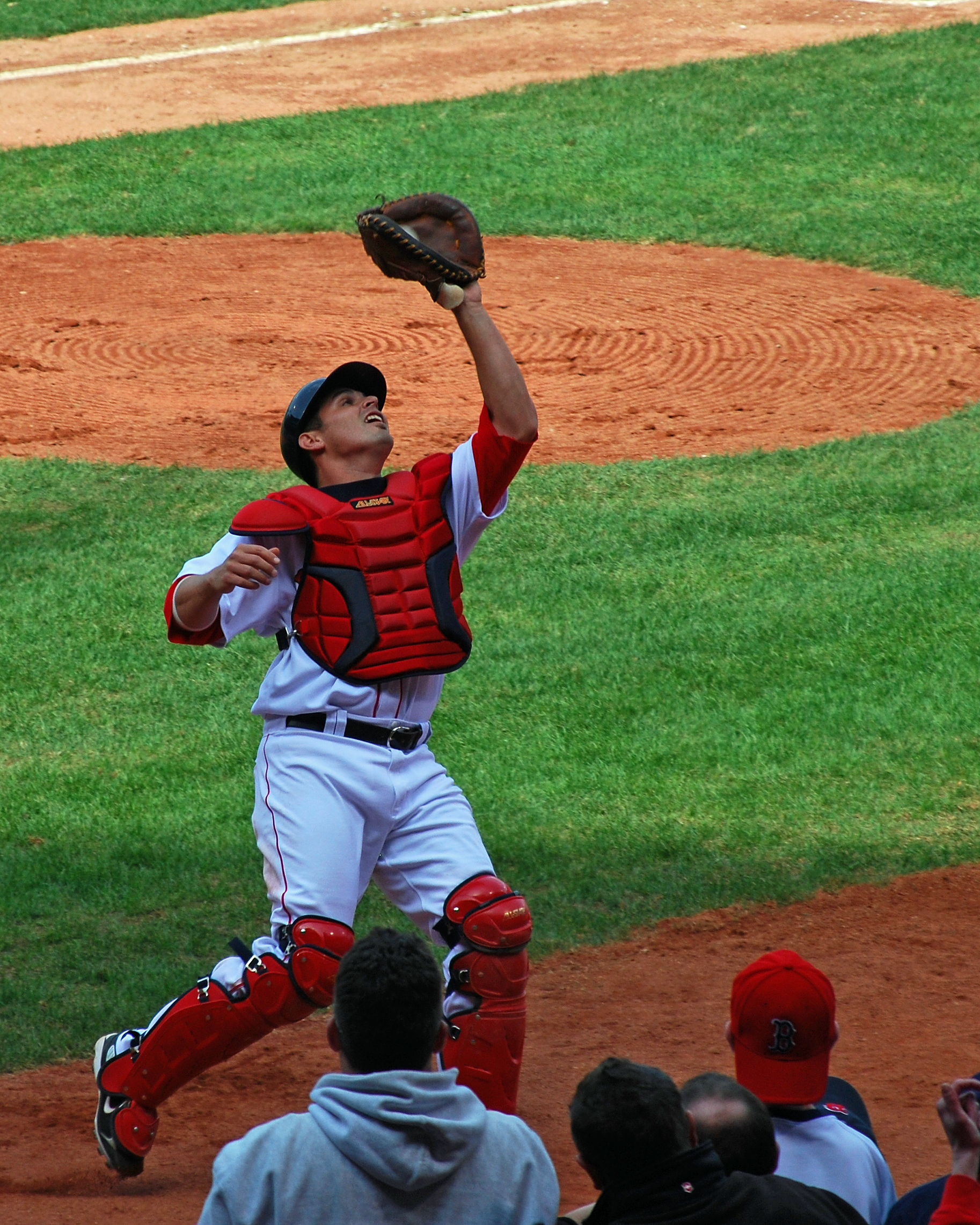
Cash with the 2008 Red Sox

Cash signed a minor league contract with the Boston Red Sox on January 24, 2007. He spent most of the season with the Pawtucket Red Sox, hitting .176 with seven home runs and 25 RBIs in 59 games. On August 17, Red Sox backup catcher Doug Mirabelli pulled a calf muscle rounding third base in the first game of a doubleheader against the Los Angeles Angels of Anaheim. Cash was flown to Boston from Ottawa (where the Pawtucket Red Sox were playing the Ottawa Lynx) to catch in the nightcap of the doubleheader. He made it to Fenway Park after the game had started. He started the game on August 19 against the Angels. On September 7, Baltimore Orioles starter Daniel Cabrera threw a pitch near Dustin Pedroia's head. In the ensuing altercation, Cabrera and Cash, who was not playing, were ejected from the game.

The Red Sox re-signed Cash to a minor league deal before the 2008 season. When Doug Mirabelli was released during spring training, Cash became the team's choice for the backup catcher role. He acted as the personal catcher for knuckleball pitcher Tim Wakefield for the season. Cash initially wore uniform number 36, but switched to 30 when Paul Byrd joined the team in August.

That year, Cash was one of three catchers on the Red Sox postseason roster, alongside Jason Varitek and David Ross. He was used sparingly in the playoffs, making his only start in Game Four of the Championship Series, where he hit a home run in his first postseason at-bat. On December 12, 2008, Cash was non-tendered by the Red Sox, officially making him a free agent.

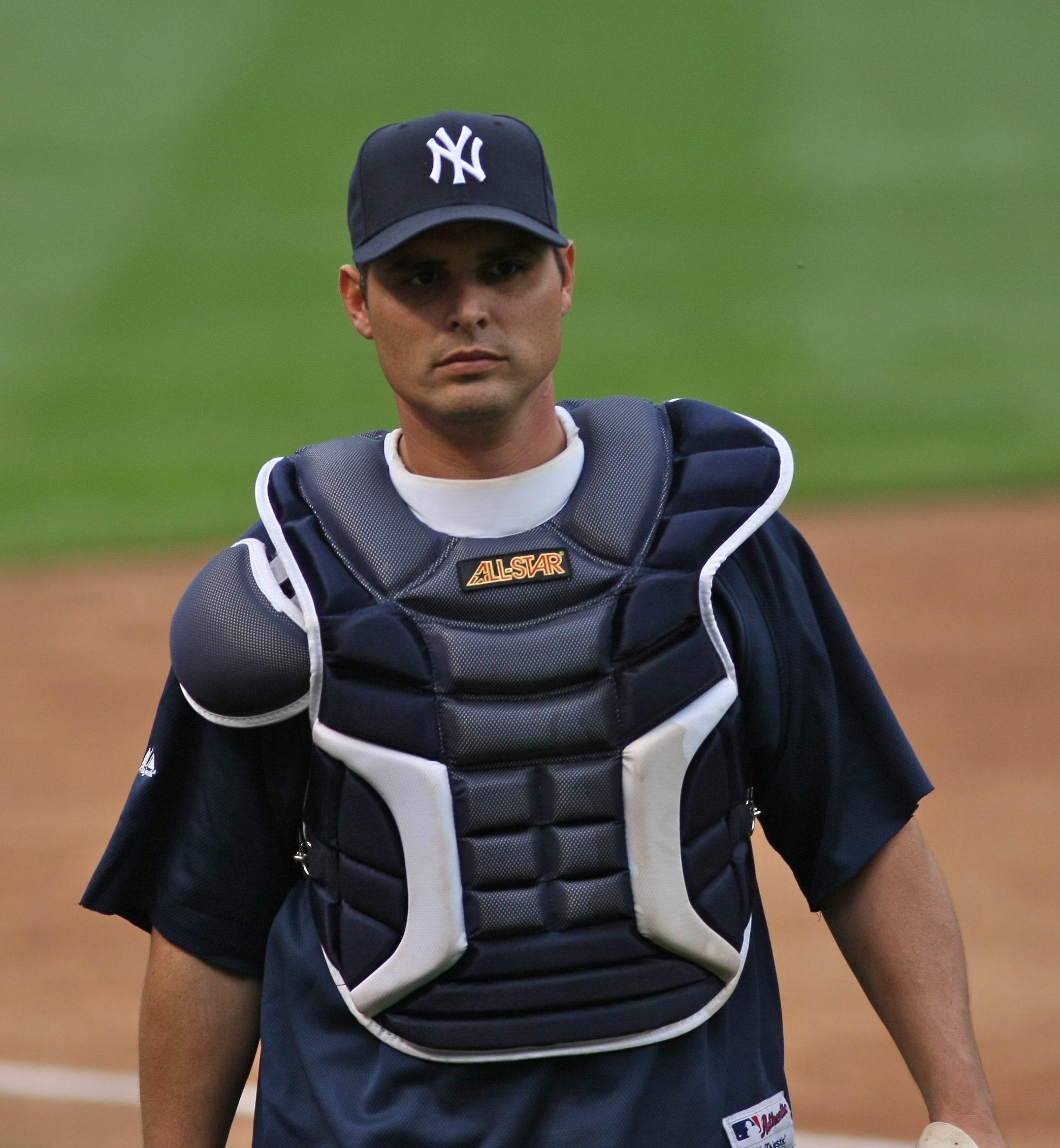
Cash with the 2009 New York Yankees

=== New York Yankees ===
On December 23, 2008, Cash signed a minor league deal with the New York Yankees with an invitation to spring training. He began the 2009 season with the Triple-A Scranton/Wilkes-Barre Yankees, but missed three weeks with a rotator cuff injury. On May 8, Cash was called up due to injuries to both Jorge Posada and José Molina. He was used alongside Francisco Cervelli as the team's catchers that month.

Cash was optioned back to Triple-A on May 29, once Posada returned from the disabled list. He was placed on the disabled list after undergoing surgery to repair a torn rotator cuff. He had appeared in 10 games with the Yankees, batting .231 with three RBIs. He was released on September 5.

=== Houston Astros ===
Before the 2010 season, Cash signed a minor league deal with the Houston Astros that included an invite to spring training. On May 5, Cash was called up to the Astros to replace a struggling J. R. Towles. He made his pitching debut on May 28 in a 15–6 blowout loss to the Cincinnati Reds. Cash allowed three hits and one run in the eight inning. He appeared in 20 games with Houston, batting .204 (11-for-54) with two home runs and four RBIs before he was designated for assignment on June 20. He was then outrighted to the minors.

=== Boston Red Sox (second stint) ===
On July 1, 2010, Cash was acquired by the Red Sox for infielder Ángel Sánchez, after Boston catcher Jason Varitek went on the disabled list. As the backup catcher for the Red Sox for part of the season, Cash appeared in 29 games, batting .133 (8-for-60) with one RBI. After the season, he was outrighted off the roster and became a free agent.

=== Texas Rangers ===
He signed a minor-league contract with the Texas Rangers on November 11, 2010. Cash played the entire 2011 season for their Triple-A affiliate, the Round Rock Express, hitting .244 in 85 games.

== Post-playing career ==
On January 8, 2012, Cash announced his retirement as a player. He was announced as an advance scout for the Blue Jays during the 2012 season.

=== Coaching ===
Shortly after the 2012 season ended, Cash joined Terry Francona's staff with the Cleveland Indians as their bullpen coach. Cash played for Francona and bench coach Brad Mills during his stint with the Red Sox. Mills was also his manager with the Houston Astros in 2010. Cash recommended Yan Gomes to general manager Chris Antonetti before Cleveland acquired him. He returned for the 2014 season.

=== Managing ===
After the 2014 season, Cash was a finalist, alongside Jeff Banister and Tim Bogar, for the Texas Rangers manager role. He was ultimately the runner-up to Banister. On December 5, 2014, the Tampa Bay Rays hired Cash as their manager, succeeding Joe Maddon and becoming the youngest manager in MLB. He was chosen over Royals bench coach Don Wakamatsu and Raul Ibanez. Cash's initial contract was for $5 million over five years.

In 2015, Cash had more replay challenges than any other MLB manager with 54, but also had the lowest success rate with 31.5%. He was also the only manager to have more than 10 challenges within the first two innings. His first ejection as a manager came on April 16, following an unsuccessful replay challenge. The Rays finished with an 82–80 record that year.

In June 2016, the Rays went through an 11-game losing streak. By mid-August Tampa Bay was 127–155 under Cash. Despite this, Rays owner Stuart Sternberg came out in support of his manager. Instead, the Rays fired hitting coach Derek Shelton on September 6. Cash greatly improved his success rate on replay challenges, becoming the 11th most successful manager with a 59.2% overturn rate in 2016. The Rays finished with a 68–94 record that year.

On July 2, 2017, Cash fractured his ankle while running. He managed the game that day and remained with the team. By August 30, the Rays were 214-244 under Cash, though he was still expected to return as manager. The Rays finished with an 80–82 record, a 12-win improvement over the 2016 season. Following the 2017 season, pitching coach Jim Hickey, bench coach Tom Foley, and assistant hitting coach Jamie Nelson left their positions. All three had been in place under Joe Maddon.

In 2018, Cash's Rays introduced the concept of the opener, a relief pitcher who would pitch to the first few batters of a game before giving way to a pitcher who can pitch for multiple innings. Tampa Bay first tried this new approach with Sergio Romo on May 19, and then again on May 22 and 23. By August, the team's openers had a combined 3.97 ERA against the 4.15 league average. Other MLB teams soon adopted the strategy. He also became known for his unorthodox substitutions. On June 26, Jose Alvarado pitched to a batter in the ninth inning, then moved to first base for an out, before returning to the mound to face the next hitter. Cash did it again on July 25, when he had Romo temporarily move to third base in the ninth inning. Cash guided the Rays to a 90–72 record that year; however, Tampa Bay still missed the playoffs. On October 9, 2018, it was announced that the Rays had extended Cash through the 2024 season with an additional option year.

During the 2018 Winter Meetings in December, Cash told the media that the Rays would continue to deploy an opener in 2019. On April 7, 2019, he had left-hander Adam Kolarek temporarily play first base so he could stay in to pitch against two left-handed batters. On July 24, he orchestrated the same maneuver. Red Sox manager Alex Cora was so confused by the move that he went onto the field four different times to get clarification from the umpire; only one pitch was thrown over a 21-minute period. Boston completed the game under protest over concerns of illegal substitutions. The Rays clinched the American League Wild Card on September 27 and finished in second place in the AL East with a 96–66 record. Tampa Bay defeated the Oakland Athletics in the Wild Card Game then fell to the Astros in the Division Series. He was named American League Manager of the Year by Sporting News for leading a team with a $53 million payroll to a playoff berth.

On September 1, 2020, New York Yankees pitcher Aroldis Chapman threw a pitch that narrowly missed the head of Rays batter Mike Brosseau. After the game, Cash warned the Yankees that "I got a whole damn stable full of guys that throw 98 mph. Period." Cash received a one-game suspension for his comments. The 2020 Rays finished first in the AL East, and advanced to the 2020 World Series via playoff wins over the Toronto Blue Jays (2–0), Yankees (3–2), and Houston Astros (4–3). The Rays went on to lose the World Series to the Los Angeles Dodgers (4-2). In a controversial decision in game six, Cash removed starting pitcher and former Cy Young Award winner Blake Snell from the game in the sixth inning while holding a 1–0 lead. Snell had only allowed two hits while striking out nine batters. While the move was typical of the season long strategy for the Rays, many were critical of the decision to bring in reliever Nick Anderson. A normally dominant Anderson may have been overworked, having pitched over 14 innings in the 2020 playoffs. Mookie Betts doubled with a runner on, setting up World Series MVP Corey Seager to drive in the go ahead runs. This move sparked controversy from many members of the media, fans, and some players, including Snell himself. Cash said after the game "I guess I regret it because it didn't work out. But I feel like the thought process was right... Every decision that's made, that end result has a pretty weighing factor in how you feel about it. If we had to do it over again, I would have the utmost confidence in Nick Anderson to get through that inning.". Cash was recognized with the American League (AL) Manager of the Year Award for his team's accomplishments.

On September 25, 2021, the Rays clinched their second straight division title. Cash said about the accomplishment "We've proven we're the best team in the American League for six months. Let's keep grinding, and let's do it for one more month and then see where we go.". In the 2021 American League Division Series, they faced the Boston Red Sox, who they had beaten eleven out of nineteen times that year. The Rays won the first game, but Boston won the next three, with back-to-back walk-off wins, to advance to the next round. However, Cash was awarded his second Manager of the Year award, marking the first time that an AL manager won it in consecutive years.

On September 30, 2022, the Rays clinched a postseason berth, securing the tiebreaker against the Toronto Blue Jays. Cash led the Rays to a 86-76 record in 2022. However, they were swept 2–0 by the Cleveland Guardians in the 2022 American League Wild Card Series.

The Rays courted controversy during the team's annual LGBTQ+ Pride Night in 2022, when at least five players opted out of wearing a Pride-themed logo and cap. Cash said that the controversy did not divide the team, but provoked internal conversations within the organization. A year later, after an MLB directive banned teams from having players wearing Pride-themed patches and logos, Cash spoke in support of Pride Night: "We welcome our LGBTQ+ community — not just today. It's an everyday thing. We want everybody to come out here and feel safe at the ballpark."

The Rays started the 2023 season on a 13-game winning streak. Cash's team finished second in the American League East with a 99–63 record. They were again swept in the playoffs, losing two in a row to the Texas Rangers in the 2023 American League Wild Card Series. Cash ended the season with a 739–617 record and five consecutive playoff berths. He also finished third in Manager of the Year voting, finishing behind Brandon Hyde of the Baltimore Orioles and Bruce Bochy of the Rangers. On February 8, 2024, the Rays announced that Cash and baseball operations Erik Neander were both signed to multi-year extensions. On May 4, 2024, Cash got his 755th career win, the record for most wins by a Tampa Bay Rays manager passing Joe Maddon.

On June 15, 2024, it was reported that Cash was under contract with the Rays through 2030.

== Managerial record ==
As of October 19, 2026

Team	Year	Regular season					Postseason			
Team	Year	Games	Won	Lost	Win %	Finish	Won	Lost	Win %	Result
TB	2015	162	80	82	.494	4th in AL East	–	–	–	–
TB	2016	162	68	94	.420	5th in AL East	–	–	–	–
TB	2017	162	80	82	.494	3rd in AL East	–	–	–	–
TB	2018	162	90	72	.556	3rd in AL East	–	–	–	–
TB	2019	162	96	66	.593	2nd in AL East	3	3	.500	Lost ALDS (HOU)
TB	2020	60	40	20	.667	1st in AL East	11	9	.550	Lost World Series (LAD)
TB	2021	162	100	62	.617	1st in AL East	1	3	.250	Lost ALDS (BOS)
TB	2022	162	86	76	.531	3rd in AL East	0	2	.000	Lost ALWCS (CLE)
TB	2023	162	99	63	.611	2nd in AL East	0	2	.000	Lost ALWCS (TEX)
TB	2024	162	80	82	.494	4th in AL East	–	–	–	–
TB	2025	162	77	85	.475	4th in AL East	–	–	–	–
TB	2026	162	98	64	.605	1st in AL East	8	6	.571	Lost World Series (MIL)
Total		1,842	994	848	.540		22	24	.478	

== Personal life ==
Cash is the nephew of former MLB utility player Ron Cash. Cash and his wife, Emily, live with their three children in Pinellas County, Florida.

== Awards and honors ==
- 1999 College World Series – Tallahassee Regional MVP
- 2001 Florida State League – All-Star Team
- 2002 All-Star Futures Game

Sporting positions
Preceded by Dave Miller	Cleveland Indians bullpen coach 2013 – 2014	Succeeded by Jason Bere
