= Rudy Árias =

Cuban baseball player (1931–2018)

- Pitcher
- Born: June 6, 1931; Las Villas, Cuba
- Died: January 12, 2018 (aged 86); Miami, Florida, U.S.
- Batted: Left Threw: Left

MLB debut
- April 10, 1959, for the Chicago White Sox

Last MLB appearance
- August 26, 1959, for the Chicago White Sox

MLB statistics
- Win–loss record: 2–0
- Earned run average: 4.09
- Strikeouts: 28
- Stats at Baseball Reference

Teams
- Chicago White Sox (1959)

Rodolfo Árias Martínez (June 6, 1931 – January 12, 2018) was a Cuban-born professional baseball pitcher whose career in Organized Baseball in North America extended for a dozen seasons (1953–1962; 1966–1967). Born in Las Villas, the left-hander played one season in Major League Baseball in 1959 for the Chicago White Sox, that year's American League champion. Árias was listed as 5 feet 10 inches (1.78 m) tall and 165 pounds (75 kg).

All of Árias' 34 MLB appearances in 1959 came as a relief pitcher. He won two games and saved two more—with no defeats—as the ChiSox won their first AL pennant in 40 years. He did not pitch after August 26, and although he was listed on the club's 1959 World Series roster, he did not appear in the Fall Classic, in which the White Sox fell to the Los Angeles Dodgers in six games. In his one big-league campaign, Árias allowed 49 hits and 20 bases on balls in 44 innings pitched, with 28 strikeouts.

He was the father of Rudy Árias, a former minor league player and a longtime bullpen catcher in the major leagues for the Florida Marlins, New York Yankees and Baltimore Orioles. Rudy Sr. died January 12, 2018, in Miami at the age of 86.
