= Bobby Malkmus =

American baseball player (1931–2025)

- Infielder
- Born: July 4, 1931; Newark, New Jersey, U.S.
- Died: February 23, 2025 (aged 93)
- Batted: Right Threw: Right

MLB debut
- June 1, 1957, for the Milwaukee Braves

Last MLB appearance
- May 15, 1962, for the Philadelphia Phillies

MLB statistics
- Batting average: .215
- Home runs: 8
- Runs batted in: 46
- Stats at Baseball Reference

Teams
- Milwaukee Braves (1957); Washington Senators (1958–1959); Philadelphia Phillies (1960–1962)

Robert Edward Malkmus (July 4, 1931 – February 23, 2025) was an American professional baseball infielder and scout. He played in Major League Baseball (MLB) for the Milwaukee Braves, Washington Senators, and Philadelphia Phillies. He also managed in the farm systems of three MLB clubs – the Phillies, Montreal Expos, and Baltimore Orioles.

== Biography ==
Born and raised in Newark, New Jersey, Malkmus attended South Side High School (now Malcolm X Shabazz High School), where his small size attracted little attention from professional teams. He threw and batted right-handed, stood 5 ft 9 in (1.75 m) (1.75 m) tall and weighed 180 pounds (82 kg). He signed with the Boston Braves in 1951 and made his major league debut on June 1, 1957, with the transplanted Milwaukee Braves. The Braves were en route to the 1957 National League pennant and World Series championship, but Malkmus could collect only two hits in 22 at bats (an .091 batting average) and was sent back to the minor leagues. That autumn, he was selected by the Washington Senators in the Rule 5 draft. Washington gave Malkmus 47 games to prove himself in 1958–59, but he batted only .186 and was outrighted to the unaffiliated Denver Bears of the American Association at the May 1959 cut-down deadline.

At the close of the 1959 campaign, Malkmus was again eligible for the Rule 5 draft, and the Philadelphia Phillies selected him. Malkmus would appear in 208 games as a utility infielder for the Phils, through the May 1962 cutdown deadline. In his best campaign, 1961, he played in 121 games, and batted .231 in 342 at-bats with seven home runs and 31 runs batted in. One sportswriter gave him a Most Valuable Player Award vote after the season. For his MLB career of all or parts of six seasons (1957–62), Malkmus hit .215 with 123 hits, eight homers and 46 RBI.

He managed in the minor leagues for nine seasons (1967–75), compiling a 508–463 record (.523) with one championship. Malkmus then scouted for the Cleveland Indians and San Diego Padres through the mid-2000s, based in Union, New Jersey. He continued to scout part-time for Cleveland as of 2017 until 2025.

Malkmus died on February 23, 2025, at the age of 93.
