= Joe Maddon =

American baseball coach & manager (born 1954)

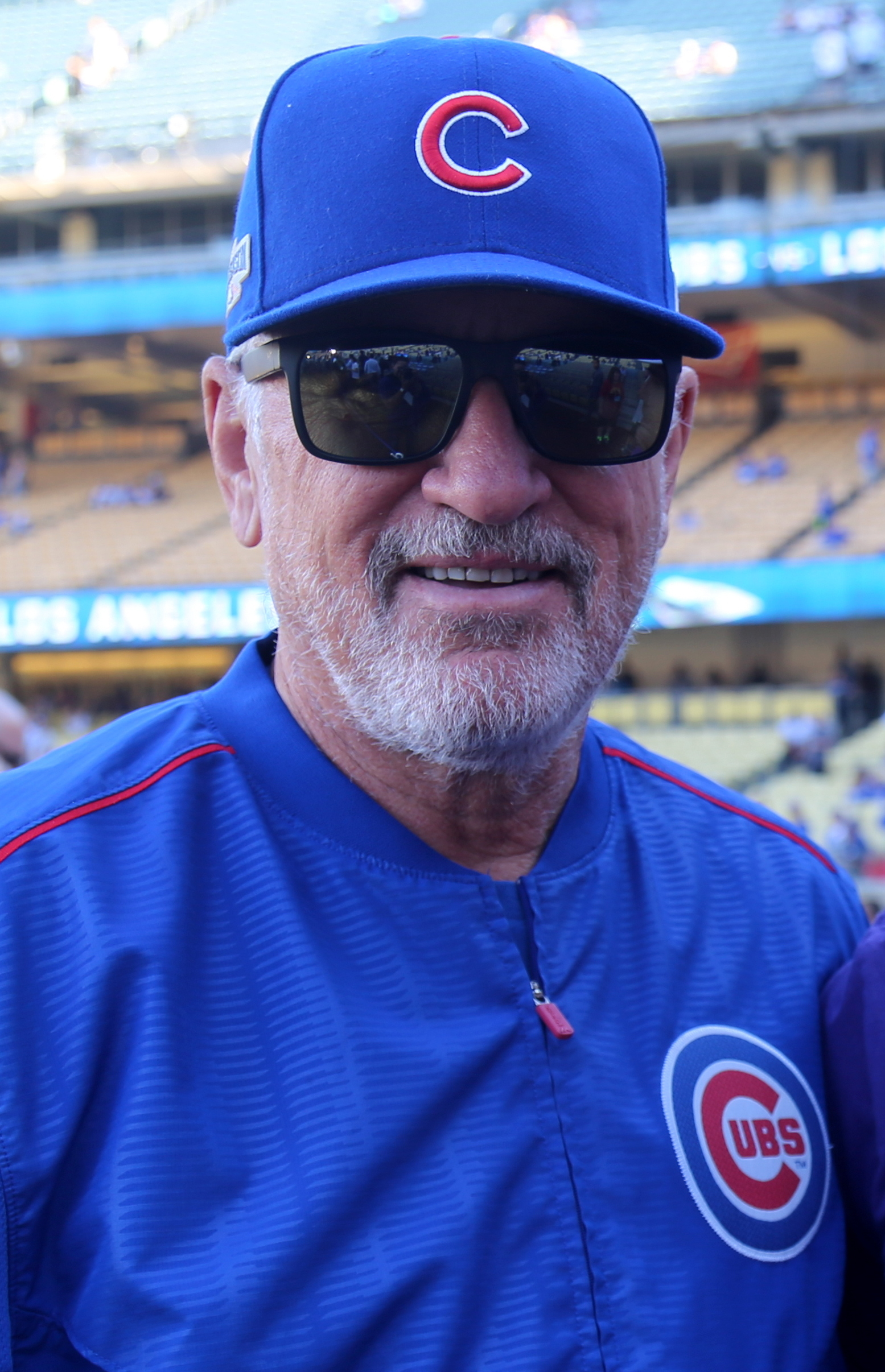
- Maddon with the Chicago Cubs in 2016
- Manager
- Born: February 8, 1954 (age 72); Hazleton, Pennsylvania, U.S.

MLB statistics
- Managerial record: 1,382–1,216
- Winning %: .532
- Stats at Baseball Reference
- Managerial record at Baseball Reference

Teams
- As manager: California / Anaheim Angels (1996, 1999) (Note: 1996 and 1999 were interim stints as manager of the Angels.); Tampa Bay Devil Rays / Rays (2006–2014); Chicago Cubs (2015–2019); Los Angeles Angels (2020–2022); As coach: California / Anaheim Angels / Los Angeles Angels of Anaheim (1994–2005)

Career highlights and awards
- 2× World Series champion (2002, 2016); 3× Manager of the Year (2008, 2011, 2015)

Joseph John Maddon (born February 8, 1954) is an American former professional baseball manager. He has managed the Tampa Bay Rays, Chicago Cubs, and Los Angeles Angels of Major League Baseball (MLB).

After playing and coaching in the minor leagues, Maddon began his MLB coaching career with the Angels in 1994 and served under managers Buck Rodgers, Marcel Lachemann, John McNamara, Terry Collins, and Mike Scioscia. He served two stints as interim manager during this time. He managed the Rays from 2006 through 2014, winning the 2008 American League pennant.

After opting out of his contract following the 2014 season, Maddon joined the Cubs. He led them to the 2015 National League Championship Series and was named the 2015 National League Manager of the Year. In 2016, Maddon managed the Cubs to their first World Series title since 1908. He managed the Cubs through 2019 and managed the Angels from 2020 to 2022.

== Early life and career ==
Maddon grew up in Hazleton, Pennsylvania, the son of an Italian father, Joseph Anthony Maddon (who shortened the family name from Maddonini), and a Polish mother, Albina Klocek, Maddon grew up in an apartment over his father's plumbing shop. His father died in 2002.

Maddon attended Lafayette College, where he played baseball and football. He is a member of Zeta Psi fraternity. He received an Honorary Doctor of Letters from Lafayette College on September 2, 2010.

Maddon began his professional career playing in Minor League Baseball as a catcher, signing with the California Angels organization as a free agent in 1975. Maddon never advanced higher than Class A, in which he played for four seasons. He began his career for the Quad Cities Angels in 1976, hitting .294 in 50 games and 163 at bats. He followed up with two seasons for the Salinas Angels and a final season with the Santa Clara Padres. In his four seasons, he never had more than 180 at bats in a season, and the most home runs he ever hit was three for the Salinas Angels in 1977. Overall, he hit .267 with 5 home runs in 514 at bats.

== Coaching/managerial career ==
=== California/Anaheim/Los Angeles Angels of Anaheim (1975–2005) ===
In 1979, after spending four seasons trying to make it as a catcher in the Angels organization, Maddon decided to give up his playing career and become a coach. He started as a scout and would continue on to such positions as manager in the Angels farm system and Minor League roving hitting instructor.

As a minor league manager, he had a 279–339 (.451) record in six seasons. He managed in the minors from 1981 to 1986, each team having a losing record. His stops included managing the Idaho Falls Angels of the Rookie League (1981), the Class A Salem Angels (1982–1983), Class A Peoria Chiefs (1984), and the Class AA Midland Angels (1985–1986). After serving as Minor League roving instructor from 1987 to 1993, Maddon was promoted to the big league club as a coach.

Maddon served as a major league coach for the Angels from 1994 to 2005. He held such positions as first base coach, bench coach, and interim manager on three occasions following the hospitalization of John McNamara in 1996, the suspension of Terry Collins in 1998, and Collins' eventual departure in 1999. He finished with a combined record of 27 wins and 24 losses as interim manager. He also served under Marcel Lachemann from 1993 to 1994. While he served as bench coach under McNamara and Collins, he rotated positions often. He finally found stability when the Angels hired Mike Scioscia in 1999. He served as Scioscia's bench coach from 2000 to 2005, winning a World Series ring in 2002. By the time Maddon left Anaheim, he had spent 31 years overall with the Angels organization. Maddon was considered a candidate for the Boston Red Sox manager job in 2004, which went to Terry Francona.

=== Tampa Bay Devil Rays/Rays (2006–2014) ===
==== 2006–2007 ====
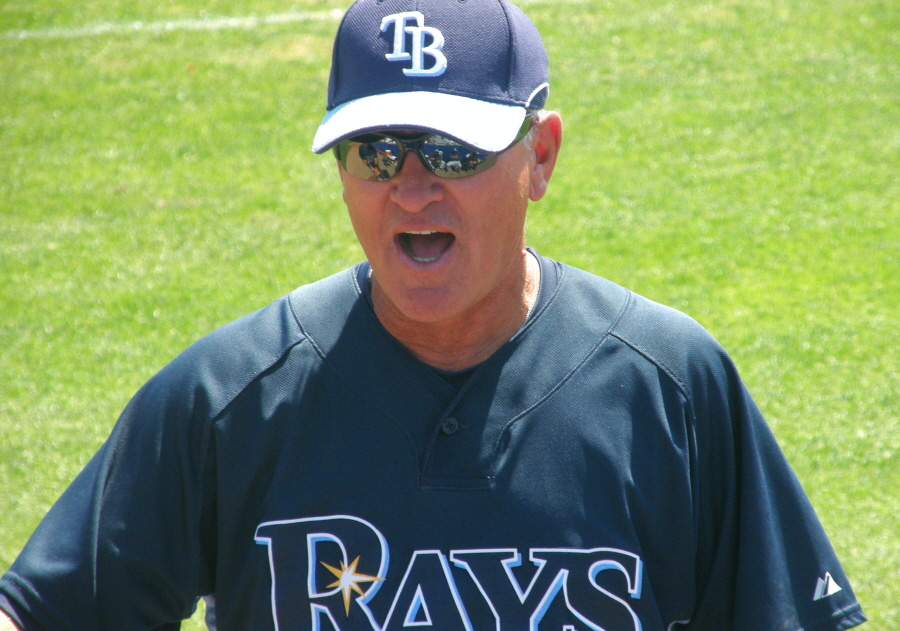
Maddon with the Rays

On November 15, 2005, Maddon was hired to manage the Tampa Bay Devil Rays. The Rays went 121–197 (.381) in Maddon's first two seasons. The Rays were in yet another re-building phase, this time under the management of General Manager Andrew Friedman. Tampa Bay held the lowest payroll in baseball at $44 million. They had yet to have a winning season but were hopeful due to the development of young homegrown stars David Price, Evan Longoria, James Shields and B. J. Upton. Unlike his predecessor, Lou Piniella, Maddon preached patience in developing a young core of players while enduring back to back 90+ game losing seasons.

==== 2008 season ====
In 2008, Maddon guided the newly renamed Rays to the first winning season and division title in franchise history. He led a team of young players that won the American League East over the heavily favored New York Yankees and Boston Red Sox. Maddon's team recorded the franchise's first playoff series victory in the 2008 American League Division Series (ALDS) vs. the Chicago White Sox by 3–1, and followed with a 4-games-to-3 triumph over the rival Red Sox in the 2008 American League Championship Series (ALCS). This was the first World Series appearance for the Rays, in which Tampa Bay held home-field advantage against the Philadelphia Phillies. The Phillies won the World Series in five games. Maddon won the American League Manager of the Year Award. He also received the Chuck Tanner Major League Baseball Manager of the Year Award.

==== 2009 season ====
On May 25, 2009, the Tampa Bay Rays and Maddon agreed to a contract extension that would keep him manager of the Rays through 2012. He had been in the final year of his initial contract with the team. The Rays stated that there was "never a question" on whether to keep Maddon after the conclusion of the 2009 season.

On July 14, 2009, Maddon managed the American League All Star team to a 4–3 victory. Controversy accompanied his failure to pick second baseman Ian Kinsler as a reserve, despite Kinsler having narrowly come in second in the fan voting, the player voting, and the "Sprint Final Vote" competition. To replace fellow second baseman Dustin Pedroia, Maddon instead chose Tampa Bay's first baseman Carlos Peña. Similarly, to replace Longoria, Maddon chose Chone Figgins of the Angels.

==== 2010 season ====
When MLB ordered in April 2010 that managers and coaches wear the official team jacket or approved Majestic pullover over their jersey, and not "hoodies", Maddon complained that "it's almost like a security blanket for me. Managing without a hoodie on a cool night could be very disconcerting. Furthermore, I think it's wrong." MLB reversed their decision a few days later.

On September 28, 2010, the Rays clinched their second playoff berth in team history. This was their second playoff appearance in three years. They finished the year at 96–66. The Rays won their second AL East championship, but lost to the Texas Rangers 3–2 in the 2010 ALDS.

==== 2011–2013 ====
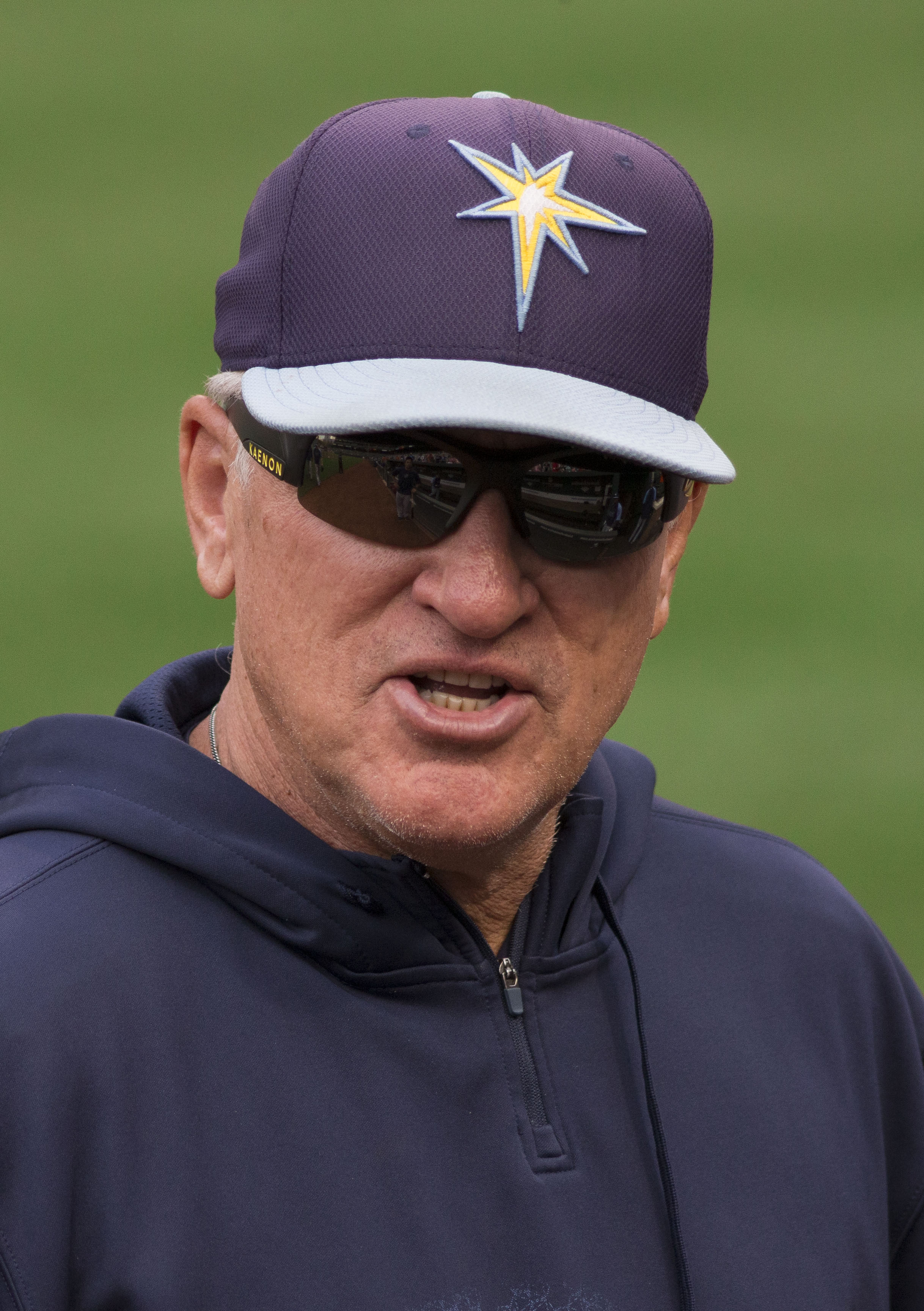
Maddon in 2013.

In 2011, the Rays made a second consecutive playoff appearance, clinching the American League Wild Card on the final day of the season, despite an 0–6 start to the season and a nine-game deficit in the wild card race in September. The Rays lost in the 2011 ALDS to the Rangers 3 games to 1. After the end of the season Maddon was named the AL Manager of the Year for the second time in his career. On February 13, 2012, the Rays signed Maddon to a three-year extension.

On April 16, 2012, in a game against the Red Sox, Maddon won his 500th career game as manager. The Rays finished the season at 90–72, good for third place in the AL East and third in the AL Wild Card.

Maddon earned his 600th win on May 8, 2013, with a victory over the Toronto Blue Jays. Maddon earned his 700th win on May 25, 2014, with a victory over the Boston Red Sox. The Rays finished the season with a 92–71 record, clinching the American League Wild Card. They lost the 2013 ALDS to the Boston Red Sox, 3-games-to-1.

==== 2014 season ====
Maddon was noted for being more eccentric than most other baseball managers. The Rays' starting batting order he submitted for an 8–1 away loss to the Detroit Tigers on 3 July 2014 was a tribute to Tommy Tutone's 1981 hit song "867-5309/Jenny" based on fielding position numbers used in scorekeeping.

The Rays finished with their worst record in seven years, at 77–85. They lost Matt Moore to Tommy John surgery and dealt with constant trade rumors regarding such stars as David Price and Ben Zobrist. Price would end up being traded to the Detroit Tigers, while Zobrist finished the season in St. Petersburg. The Rays dealt with a flurry of injuries, and never recovered. They were eliminated from postseason contention on September 19.

On October 14, 2014, Rays' General Manager Andrew Friedman left Tampa Bay to assume the role of President of Baseball Operations for the Los Angeles Dodgers. Friedman's departure activated an opt-out clause in Maddon's contract, allowing Maddon to do so within two weeks of Friedman's resignation. The Rays tried "aggressively" to re-sign Maddon, during that period, but Maddon opted out of his contract. Maddon finished his tenure with a record of 754 wins and 705 losses.

==== Exit from Tampa Bay ====
Almost immediately after news broke of Maddon's departure from St. Petersburg, rumors started linking him to the Cubs' managerial position which, at the time, was held by Rick Renteria. Cubs management had promised Renteria he would indeed be returning to manage the club in 2015 following the completion of the 2014 season. On November 2, 2014, the Cubs announced that they had fired Renteria and hired Maddon. Maddon's contract was for five years and $25 million. Renteria was offered a variety of other positions with the Cubs, which he declined. After being fired by the Cubs, Renteria signed on as the Chicago White Sox bench coach for the 2016 season, and became the team manager in 2017.

The Rays filed tampering charges with MLB, claiming that the only reason Maddon opted out in Tampa Bay was due to his becoming aware that the Cubs would offer him a deal that would make him the highest paid manager in the game. Cubs President Theo Epstein claimed that he had sent an email to MLB to be certain that Maddon was indeed a free agent before contacting him about their managerial position. On April 29, 2015, MLB cleared the Cubs of any tampering charges.

=== Chicago Cubs (2015–2019) ===
Maddon managed the Chicago Cubs from 2015 to 2019, breaking the Cubs' 108-year World Series Championship drought in his second year with a 4–3 series win over the Cleveland Indians. His .581 winning percentage is the most for a Cubs manager since Frank Chance, and his 19 playoff victories as manager are a team record, as are the team's four consecutive playoff berths from 2015 to 2018. Following the Cubs' quick exit from the 2018 playoffs, the Cubs opted not to give Maddon an extension on his five-year contract, which the team allowed to expire after Chicago failed to make the playoffs the following year.

==== 2015–2016 ====
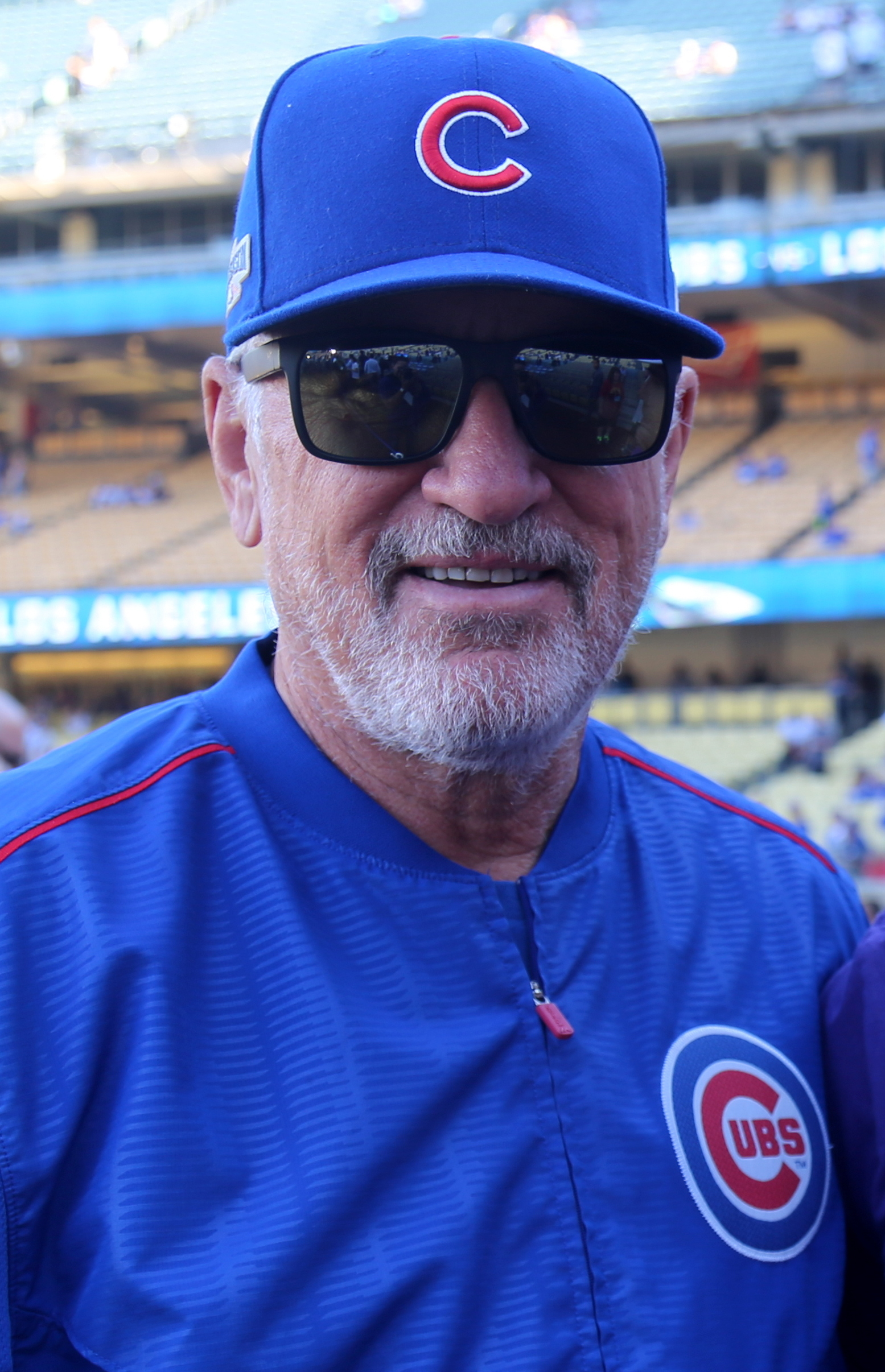
Maddon with the Chicago Cubs in 2016.

On May 14, 2015, Maddon logged his 800th managerial win in a 6–5 home victory over the New York Mets, placing him eighth among active managers. In June, on a road trip to play the Mets, Maddon brought in a magician to perform in the Cubs clubhouse. The Cubs had lost five straight games and it was something Maddon had done before with the Rays. At the conclusion of the first half of the season, the Cubs held a record of 47–40, good for third place in the highly contested National League Central division. The Cubs had finished in last place for three consecutive seasons.

After coming out sluggishly after the All Star Break, Cole Hamels of the Philadelphia Phillies no-hit the Cubs at Wrigley Field on July 25. Following a sweep by the Phillies, the team with the worst record in baseball, the Cubs went on a nine-game winning streak, and at the time held the best road record in the Majors. The Cubs continued their hot streak throughout the second half of the season, which included a no-hitter by Jake Arrieta on August 30 in Los Angeles. On September 26, following a San Francisco Giants loss to the Oakland Athletics, the Cubs clinched their first postseason berth since 2008. They finished the season with 97 wins, an improvement of 24 over 2014 and their first 97-win season since 2008.

In the National League Wild Card Game, the Cubs defeated the Pittsburgh Pirates by a score of 4–0 at PNC Park on a complete game shutout from Arrieta, advancing to the National League Division Series (NLDS) to face the St. Louis Cardinals. The win marked the Cubs' first postseason victory since Game 4 of the 2003 National League Championship Series (NLCS). After losing game 1 in St. Louis, the Cubs went on to win three straight, winning the NLDS at Wrigley Field. This was the Cubs' first ever postseason clinch at Wrigley Field. The Cubs played the Mets in the NLCS, but lost in a four game sweep. After the season, Maddon won the National League Manager of the Year Award.

Maddon's young Cubs team entered the 2016 season as the bookmakers' favorite to win the World Series. They started the season on a tear, taking over first place in the NL Central on April 11, a lead they never relinquished. By May 10, the Cubs had a record of 25–6 (0.806 win percentage) with a commanding 8.5 game lead in their division. The team would go on to post a 103–58 regular season record, their first 100-win season in over 80 years, and led their division by as many as 19 games. They entered the postseason as heavy favorites, and dispatched the Giants in four games with a four-run 9th inning comeback in the clincher at AT&T Park. On October 22, 2016, the Cubs beat the Los Angeles Dodgers in Game 6 of the NLCS, earning their first pennant since 1945, also allowing Maddon to join the small list of managers who won pennants in both leagues. Their streak of not winning a pennant was the longest in MLB history, lasting 71 years. They beat the Cleveland Indians in Game 7 of the World Series, for their first World Series title in 108 years.

==== 2017–2018 ====
On May 16, 2017, Maddon won his 1,000th game as manager in a 9–5 victory over the Cincinnati Reds. Despite falling behind 4.5 games to the Milwaukee Brewers and posting a losing record at the All-Star Break, the Cubs rallied to repeat as NL Central Division Champions and finish with a 92–70 record. Chicago defeated the Nationals three games to two in the NLDS, marking the Cubs' fourth straight postseason series victory. However, Chicago could not clinch a second straight NL pennant, falling 4–1 in the NLCS to the Dodgers. In 2017 the National Polish-American Sports Hall of Fame awarded its NPASHF Excellence in Sports Award to Joe Maddon.

Maddon's 2018 team saw several key departures from both the player roster and the coaching staff, including 2015 Cy Young Winner Jake Arrieta, right-handed starter John Lackey, 2017 closer Wade Davis, former closer Hector Rondon, bench coach Dave Martinez, pitching coach Chris Bosio and hitting coach John Mallee. The Cubs made several free-agency acquisitions to bolster their pitching staff, including former Dodgers Yu Darvish and Brandon Morrow.

While the Cubs finished with three more wins than their division-winning 2017 record, Chicago's 95 wins were unable to secure a third straight division championship. While the Cubs entered September with a 5-game lead over Milwaukee, the Brewers won four of their final six games against Chicago and completed their season with a seven-game winning streak to force a game 163. Chicago lost both the tiebreaker and the subsequent Wild Card game at home, the latter of which came against Colorado in 13 innings.

==== 2019 season and departure ====
The Cubs opted not to extend Maddon's contract during the 2018 offseason. Epstein told the press that the club would not enter into talks with Maddon's agent until after the upcoming season. The Cubs also dismissed hitting coach Chili Davis and pitching coach Jim Hickey, both of whom were hired the preceding year.

After the team limped to a 1–6 start through its first seven games, the Cubs overtook the St. Louis Cardinals for first place on May 5 with a three-game home sweep of the division rivals. From April 7 through May 29, the Cubs had a 22–7 record at 24–14 overall and 2.0 games above the second place Milwaukee Brewers.

Through the remainder of the 2019 season, the Cubs played sub-500 baseball with a 60–64 record, which included a two month stretch where the team did not win a road series. However, the Cubs remained in contention for both a Wild Card spot and the Central Division heading into the final 10 games of the season, seven of which were against the division-leading Cardinals. St. Louis swept Chicago at Wrigley Field in four games for the first time since 1921, the first of a nine-game losing stretch that would keep the Cubs from a playoff berth for the first time since 2014.

On September 29, before the final game of the season, Epstein and Maddon announced in a joint press conference that Maddon's initial five-year contract would not be renewed. Maddon's final game as Cubs manager was a 9–0 loss to St. Louis that clinched the division and ended a four-year playoff drought for the Cardinals. The Cubs finished in third place at 84–78, seven games out of first place.

Maddon's departure was originally described by both the Cubs and himself as a "mutual agreement" to part ways, but he later revealed in 2021 that he actually wanted to continue as the Cubs manager with a two-year extension and that his release as Cubs manager was one-sided.

=== Return to the Los Angeles Angels (2020–2022) ===
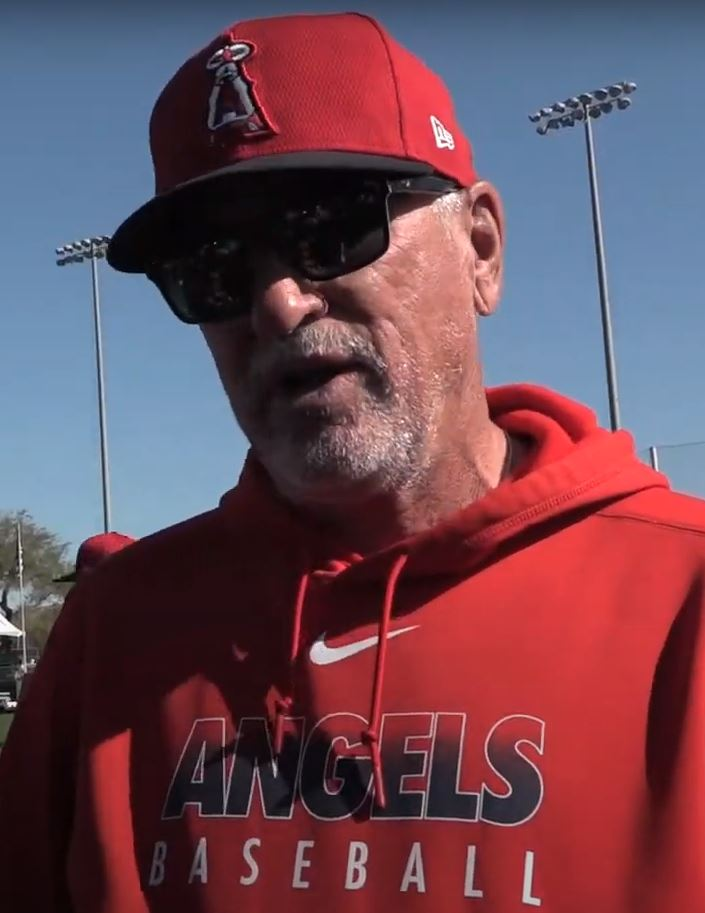
Maddon with the Angels in 2020.

On October 16, 2019, it was announced that Maddon would be returning to the Angels as manager for the 2020 season. He signed a three-year deal.

==== 2020 season ====
Due to the ongoing COVID-19 pandemic, the 2020 season was shortened to 60 games. In addition, the playoffs were expanded to include eight teams from each league instead of the regular five. Despite this, the Angels finished the season at 26–34 to finish in fourth place in the AL West, missing the playoffs for the sixth consecutive season.

==== 2021 season ====
Maddon led the Angels in the 2021 season, his first 162-game season as manager for the team. In February 2021, Maddon announced that he would allow Shohei Ohtani to both hit and pitch following his 2019 Tommy John surgery recovery and 2020 setback. Maddon and the Angels adopted a 6-man rotation to allow Ohtani to pitch once every 7 days and serve as designated hitter in-between. On April 4, 2021, Maddon let Ohtani bat for himself as a starting pitcher for the first time in his career. It was the first time in Angels history that a manager had waived the designated hitter spot and was the first time across the American League since the Tampa Bay Rays did so on May 17, 2009, an instance where Maddon himself accidentally submitted an incorrect lineup card. Just before the 2021 All-Star Game, Maddon consulted American League team manager Kevin Cash about having Ohtani both hit and pitch in the game.

The Angels finished the 2021 season with a 77–85 record, placing 4th in their division and missing the playoffs. Maddon made 6 successful managerial challenges out of 20 attempts, a rate of 30%. He was ejected from 3 games. The Angels hit sacrifice bunts at a 2.0% rate, the highest under Maddon's management since the 2014 Rays and similar to the small ball that the 2002 Angels utilized when Maddon was an assistant coach.

==== 2022 season ====
A month before the start of the 2022 season, Maddon told the media that he was considering the possibility of moving veteran superstar Mike Trout out of center field to a corner outfield spot in an effort to prevent injuries. In the hypothetical move, Trout would have been moved out of center field for the first time since 2013 in favor of Brandon Marsh, a former top prospect who spent time at the position during Trout's 2021 injury. Less than 24 hours after floating the idea, Maddon met with Trout and ultimately decided that he would keep him in center field.

On April 15, 2022, in a game where the Angels trailed the Texas Rangers 3–2, Maddon ordered that Corey Seager be intentionally walked despite the bases being loaded, making the score 4–2. The Rangers then went up 6–2 in the inning after a sacrifice fly hit by Mitch Garver and a balk by Angels pitcher Austin Warren that scored Marcus Semien. It was the first time a manager called for an intentional walk with the bases loaded since Maddon himself did so on Josh Hamilton in 2008. It was the first instance of a manager ordering an intentional walk with the bases loaded while trailing in the game since Jim O'Rourke of the 1881 Buffalo Bisons. Maddon's Angels came back to win the game by a score of 9–6.

On June 7, 2022, as the team reached a 12-game losing streak, Maddon was fired by the Angels upon a visit to his Pasadena home by general manager Perry Minasian. The team was 27-29 when he was fired; they went 46-60 the rest of the way, mostly under interim manager Phil Nevin. Maddon, along with Dave Roberts who had been passed over in favor of Bob Melvin and Mike Shildt, were allowed to attend the 2022 Major League Baseball All-Star Game as guests of Los Angeles Dodgers majority owner Mark Walter.

== Managerial record ==
As of the 2022 season

Team	Year	Regular season					Postseason			
Team	Year	Games	Won	Lost	Win %	Finish	Won	Lost	Win %	Result
CAL	1996	22	8	14	.364	4th in AL West	–	–	–	
ANA	1999	29	19	10	.655	4th in AL West	–	–	–	
TB	2006	162	61	101	.377	5th in AL East	–	–	–	
TB	2007	162	66	96	.407	5th in AL East	–	–	–	
TB	2008	162	97	65	.599	1st in AL East	8	8	.500	Lost World Series (PHI)
TB	2009	162	84	78	.519	3rd in AL East	–	–	–	
TB	2010	162	96	66	.593	1st in AL East	2	3	.400	Lost ALDS (TEX)
TB	2011	162	91	71	.562	2nd in AL East	1	3	.250	Lost ALDS (TEX)
TB	2012	162	90	72	.556	3rd in AL East	–	–	–	
TB	2013	163	92	71	.564	2nd in AL East	2	3	.400	Lost ALDS (BOS)
TB	2014	162	77	85	.475	4th in AL East	–	–	–	
TB total		1,459	754	705	.517		13	17	.433	
CHC	2015	162	97	65	.599	3rd in NL Central	4	5	.444	Lost NLCS (NYM)
CHC	2016	162	103	58	.640	1st in NL Central	11	6	.647	Won World Series (CLE)
CHC	2017	162	92	70	.568	1st in NL Central	4	6	.400	Lost NLCS (LAD)
CHC	2018	163	95	68	.583	2nd in NL Central	0	1	.000	Lost NLWC (COL)
CHC	2019	162	84	78	.519	3rd in NL Central	–	–	–	
CHC total		811	471	339	.581		19	18	.514	
LAA	2020	60	26	34	.433	4th in AL West	–	–	–	
LAA	2021	162	77	85	.475	4th in AL West	–	–	–	
LAA	2022	56	27	29	.482	Fired	–	–	–	
Angels total		329	157	172	.477		–	–	–	
Total		2,599	1,382	1,216	.532		32	35	.478	

== Uniform number ==
Maddon wears the unusual uniform #70. He has said that his preferred number used to be #20, but that he lost that number when future Hall-of-Famer Don Sutton came to the Angels. He was then randomly assigned #70 and declared that he would never change it so that his number would never be taken from him again.

== Charitable organizations ==
Maddon's organization, Respect 90 Foundation, hosts a charity golf tournament annually in his hometown of Hazleton, Pennsylvania. Respect 90 and Maddon also sponsor a charity boxing event in Chicago annually. The Respect 90 Foundation raises funds to benefit inner city youth.

In 2017, Joe Maddon and his neighbor Jill Kelley hosted a Gasparilla party for wounded veterans.

== Personal life ==
Maddon has two children from a previous marriage and has five grandchildren through it. Maddon married his second wife in 2008.

== See also ==
- List of Major League Baseball All-Star Game managers
- List of Major League Baseball managers with most career ejections
- List of Major League Baseball managers with most career wins

== Notes ==
Sporting positions
Preceded by Reuben Rodriguez	Idaho Falls Angels Manager; 1981	Succeeded by last manager
Preceded by first manager	Salem Angels Manager; 1982–1983	Succeeded by Larry Patterson
Preceded by Vern Hoscheit (Yankees affiliate)	Peoria Chiefs Manager; 1984	Succeeded by Pete Mackanin (Cubs affiliate)
Preceded by first manager	Midland Angels Manager; 1985–1986	Succeeded by Max Oliveras
Preceded by Chuck Hernandez	California Angels Bullpen Coach; 1993–1995	Succeeded by Bill Lachemann
Preceded by John Wathan	Anaheim Angels Bench Coach; 1995–2005	Succeeded by Ron Roenicke
Preceded by Lou Pinella	Tampa Bay Devil Rays/Rays Manager; 2006–2014	Succeeded by Kevin Cash
Preceded by Rick Renteria	Chicago Cubs Manager; 2015–2019	Succeeded by David Ross
Preceded by Brad Ausmus	Los Angeles Angels Manager; 2020–2022	Succeeded by Phil Nevin
