= Lodi Dodgers =

- 1966–1984; Lodi, California
Team logo
Cap insignia

Minor league affiliations
- Class: Class A (1966–1984)
- League: California League (1966–1984)

Major league affiliations
- Team: Chicago Cubs (1984); Los Angeles Dodgers (1976–1983); Baltimore Orioles (1972–1975); San Diego Padres (1970–1971); Oakland Athletics (1969); Chicago Cubs (1966–1968)

Minor league titles
- League titles (3): 1973; 1977; 1981
- First-half titles (3): 1973; 1978; 1979
- Second-half titles (2): 1977; 1978

Team data
- Name: Lodi Crushers (1984); Lodi Dodgers (1976–1983); Lodi Orioles (1974–1975); Lodi Lions (1973); Lodi Orions (1972); Lodi Padres (1970–1971); Lodi Crushers (1966–1969)
- Ballpark: Lawrence Park (1966–1984)

The Lodi Dodgers were a minor league baseball team based in Lodi, California. The Dodgers were a minor league affiliate of the Los Angeles Dodgers from 1976 to 1983, playing as members of the Class A level California League and winning two league championships.

From 1966 to 1984, Lodi teams played exclusively as members of the California League, winning the 1973, 1977 and 1981 league championships. The Lodi team was first known as the "Crushers" in 1966 and returned to the nickname for their final season in 1984. Playing under various nicknames, the Lodi teams were also a minor league affiliate of the Chicago Cubs (1966–1968, 1984), Oakland Athletics (1969), San Diego Padres (1970–1971) and Baltimore Orioles (1972–1975) during their tenure of California League play.

The Lodi teams hosted California League home minor league baseball games at Lawrence Park, which is still in use and known today as Tony Zupo Field.

Playing for the 1980 Lodi Dodgers, Alan Wiggins compiled 120 stolen bases to set a then-record in professional baseball for the most stolen bases in a season.

== History ==
=== Early Teams: California State League 1904 & 1905 ===
Minor league baseball began in Lodi, California in 1904, when the "Lodi" team played as members of the Independent level California State League. The Lodi team continued play in the 1905 California State League. The California State League continued play in 1906, but without a Lodi team in the six-team league.

=== 1966 to 1969: California League Lodi Crushers ===
In 1966, Lodi again hosted minor league baseball for the first time in over sixty seasons when the Lodi "Crushers" joined the California League. Lodi began minor league play after a team of investors from the city pooled together $2,500 to establish a California League franchise in Lodi.

In 1966, the newly formed Lodi Crushers joined the eight-team, Class A level California League, as the league expanded from a six-team league. The California League added Lodi and the Reno Silver Sox as the two expansion franchises to form an eight-team league. Lodi a became a minor league affiliate of the Chicago Cubs, while Reno was a Cleveland Indians affiliate. The new Lodi and Reno franchises joined the returning Bakersfield Bears (Philadelphia Phillies affiliate), Fresno Giants (San Francisco Giants), Modesto Reds (Kansas City Athletics), San Jose Bees (California Angels), Santa Barbara Dodgers (Los Angeles Dodgers) and Stockton Ports (Baltimore Orioles) teams joined in beginning league play on April 19, 1966.

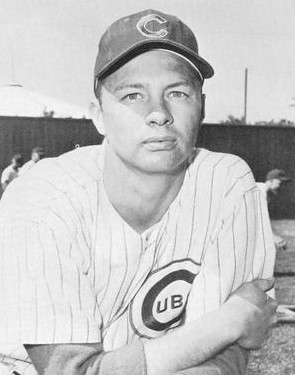
(1964) Don Elston, Chicago Cubs. An All-Star pitcher, Elston managed Lodi in their first California League season in 1966.

In their first season of play, the Lodi Crushers placed seventh in the California League. Lodi ended the 1966 season with a final record of 59–81, playing their seventh place season under managers Don Elston (25–42) and Ray Perry (37–39). Lodi ended their first California League season 28½ games behind the first place Modesto Reds in the overall final standings. The California League did not hold playoffs as Modesto won both halves of the split season schedule in the league.

Lodi's first manager Don Elston was former pitcher for the Chicago Cubs. Elston was named to two All-star teams in his career and earned the save in the 1959 Major League Baseball All-Star Game (first game).

In 1967 the Lodi Crushers continued play as a Chicago Cubs affiliate in the California League. The Crushers ended the 1967 season with a 63–77 record to finish the regular season in sixth place. Lodi was managed by Walt Dixon. In 1956, Dixon began a 20-year-long tenure as a minor league manager in the Chicago Cubs' farm system. Dixon had also served as a member of the Chicago Cubs' College of Coaches in 1964 and 1965. Lodi finished 24.0 games behind the first place San Jose Bees in the final overall standings. Lodi did not qualify for the playoff, where San Jose defeated the Modesto Reds.

Jophery Brown played for Lodi in 1967 in his second professional season, after playing collegiately at Grambling State University. Brown remained with Lodi in 1968, pitching to an 18-9 record for the Crushers and receiving a promotion to the Chicago Cubs at the end of Lodi's season. After a brief major league pitching career with the Cubs, Brown then became an award-winning stunt man and actor. Brown followed his older brother, Calvin Brown, who was a founding member of the Black Stuntmen's Association into the industry. Brown first entered his stunt man career, serving as Bill Cosby's stunt double in the television series I Spy. In 2010, Brown was awarded the Taurus Lifetime Achievement Award for his stuntwork.

The 1968 Lodi Crushers improved to a third-place finish in the eight-team Class A California League. The Crushers remained a Chicago Cubs affiliate and completed the 1968 regular season with a 75–65 record, playing the season under managers Jim Marshall and Al Heist. Lodi finished 5.0 games behind the first place San Jose Bees. Lodi did not qualify for the playoff won by the Fresno Giants over San Jose. Lodi pitcher Jophery Brown tied for the league lead with 18 wins.

Lodi manager Jim Marshall was a rookie manager with Lodi in 1968 and advanced to manage in the Chicago Cubs Class AA affiliate San Antonio Missions in 1969. Marshall continued to manage in the minor leagues before becoming a major league coach with the 1974 Chicago Cubs. In 1975, Marshall became the manager of the Chicago Cubs for two seasons and later managed the 1979 Oakland Athletics. With Oakland, Marshall managed Baseball Hall of Fame member Rickey Henderson in his rookie season before Marshall was replaced as the Oakland manager by Billy Martin for the 1980 season. Upon Henderson's promotion to the major leagues on June 24, 1979, Marshall immediately installed him as the leadoff hitter for Oakland.

After playing their first three seasons as a Chicago Cubs affiliate, the franchise became an Oakland Athletics affiliate for the 1969 California League season, while keeping Lodi "Crushers" nickname. Lodi finished in last place in the eight-team Class A level league's final regular season standings. The Crushers ended the 1969 season with a 57–83 record, to finish in eighth place. The Lodi managers were Billy Klaus (43-62), Warren Hacker (8-6) and Eli Grba (6-15). While finishing in last place in the eight-team league, Lodi ended the season 24.0 games behind the first place Stockton Ports in the overall standings. Lodi did not qualify for the playoff won by Stockton over the Visalia Mets.

George Hendrick played for Lodi in 1969 in his second professional season. Hendrick hit .307 for Lodi in 83 games. Hendrick became four-time All-Star and a two-time Silver Slugger Award winner. Hendrick led the St. Louis Cardinals in home runs for four straight seasons, from 1980 through 1983. Hendrick won World Series titles while playing with the Oakland Athletics in 1972 and St. Louis Cardinals in 1982. Hendrick ended his major league career with 1,111 total RBIs.

=== 1970 & 1971: California League - Lodi Padres ===
The Lodi franchise became a San Diego Padres affiliate in 1970 and the renamed Lodi "Padres" continued play in the Class A level California League. Lodi again finished last in the league standings. Playing the 1970 season under managers Sonny Ruberto and Ken Bracey, the Padres ended the regular season with a 43–97 record, finishing in eighth place in the eight-team league. Lodi finished the season 50½ games behind the first place Bakersfield Dodgers in the overall league standings. Lodi drew 18.245 fans for the season, lowest in the league. No playoffs were held in the league as Bakersfield won both half seasons in the California League's split season schedule.

The Lodi Padres continued as a San Diego Padres affiliate for the 1971 season California League season and ended the season in sixth place. Playing in the eight-team league, the Padres ended the regular season with record of 65–74, playing the season under manager George Freese in the Class A level league. The Lodi Padres ended the California League regular season finishing 18.0 games behind the first place Modesto Reds in the final overall standings. Lodi did not qualify for the playoffs as the Fresno Giants won the first half pennant and the Visalia Mets won the second half of the split season schedule. Visalia won the playoff to capture the league championship.

Lodi's Johnny Grubb was named as the California League Rookie of the Year in 1971, playing his first professional season at ager 22.

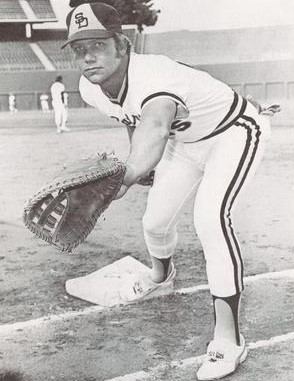
(1977) Mike Ivie, San Diego Padres. Ivie was the first pick in the 1970 Major League Baseball draft and played for Lodi in 1971.

Mike Ivie played for the 1971 Lodi Padres after being selected by the San Diego Padres as the first overall pick in the 1970 Major League Baseball draft as a catcher. He signed with the Padres, receiving a $100,000 signing bonus, and continued his career with Lodi. Ivie had developed the yips. He had trouble throwing the ball back to the pitcher and insisted to the Padres that he no longer wanted to play at catcher. He then transitioned to play some 1B and 3B with Lodi. At age 19, Ivie hit .305 with 15 home runs for Lodi in 1971. Following Lodi's season, Ivie was promoted by the San Diego Padres and made his major league debut in September 1971.

=== 1972 to 1975: California League - Baltimore Orioles affiliate ===
In December 1971, Nagayoshi Nakamura, the owner of the Lotte Orions of Nippon Professional Baseball, purchased the Lodi franchise. For the 1972 season the team became known as the Lodi "Orions." The following season, 1973, the team was renamed the Lodi "Lions" to match Nakamura's new Nippon Pro Baseball team, the Nishitetsu Lions. Nakamura sold the Lodi franchise following the 1973 season.

With the newly named Lodi Orions continuing California League play in 1972, the franchise became a Baltimore Orioles minor league affiliate, beginning a four-season partnership. The Orions ended the 1972 California League regular season with a final record of record of 67–73, finishing the season in sixth place in the eight-team league. Lodi played the season under manager Jimmie Schaffer, who began a three-year tenure as the Lodi manager. Lodi finished 21.0 games behind the first place Bakersfield Dodgers in the final overall standings. Lodi did not qualify for the playoff final, where the Modesto Reds defeated the Bakersfield Dodgers in the series. Bob Bailor of Lodi led the California League with 63 stolen bases.

The renamed Lodi "Lions" won the California League championship in 1973, the first of three championships for the Lodi franchise. Continuing as a Baltimore Orioles affiliate, the Lions ended the regular season with a record of 77–63 to finish in a first-place tie, playing under returning manager Jimmie Schaffer. In the overall California League standings, Lodi had an identical record with the Salinas Packers. Salinas did not qualify for the playoff, as Lodi won the first half of the split-season schedule, and The Bakersfield Dodgers won the second half. In the playoff final, Lodi won the 1973 California League championship as the Lions defeated Bakersfield 2 games to 0. In leading Lodi to the championship, Jimmie Schaffer was named as the California State League Manager of the Year.

In 1974, after owner Nagayoshi Nakamura sold the Lodi franchise following the 1973 season, the team became known as the Lodi "Orioles" corresponding with Lodi continuing their partnership as a Baltimore Orioles minor league affiliate. With Lodi playing as the defending California League champions, the team placed sixth. The Orioles ended the 1974 season with a final record of 61–79, to finish in a sixth place tie in the eight-team Class A league, playing the season under returning manager Jimmie Schaffer. Lodi ended the season 24.0 games behind the first place Fresno Giants in the overall standings. Lodi did not qualify for the final won by the Fresno Giants over the San Jose Bees.

Following his Lodi managerial tenure, Jimmie Schaffer, a former catcher became the bullpen coach for the Texas Rangers in 1978 and the Kansas City Royals from 1980 to 1988, where he coached for the Royals' 1980 and 1985 world series championship teams.

The 1975 Lodi Orioles were under the direction of general manager Nadine Horst. Horst was one of four female general managers in minor league baseball that season, after Lanny Moss became the first female baseball general manager the previous season, working for the Portland Mavericks.

The Lodi Orioles played Lodi's final season as a Baltimore Orioles affiliate and ended the 1975 California League season in third place. The Orioles compiled a record of 71–69 in finishing the season in third place in the eight-team league. New manager Bobby Malkmus led Lodi, who ended the season 15.0 games behind the first place Reno Silver Sox in the Class A level league's final overall standings. No California League playoff was held as Reno won both halves of the split season schedule to win the championship.

A former major league infielder, Bobby Malkmus managed his final minor league season in 1975, having begun managing in 1967. He compiled a 508–463 record (.523) with one championship in his minor league managing career. After leaving Lodi, Malkmus began a lengthy scouting tenure for the Cleveland Indians and San Diego Padres that continued through the mid-2000s. He continued to scout part-time for the Cleveland Guardians as of 2017.

=== 1976 to 1983: California League - Lodi Dodgers ===
Lodi continued California League play in 1976, as the franchise became a Los Angeles Dodgers minor league affiliate. The newly named Lodi "Dodgers" played their first season under the new nickname and ended the season in fifth place in the Class A level league. The 1976 California League reduced from eight teams to six teams for the season, as the Visalia Mets and Bakersfield Dodgers teams did not return to play. The Lodi Dodgers joined the Fresno Giants (San Francisco Giants affiliate), Modesto A's (Oakland Athletics), Reno Silver Sox (Minnesota Twins and San Diego Padres), Salinas Angels (California Angels), San Jose Bees (Cleveland Indians) teams in continuing California League play, with the season beginning on April 13, 1976.

The Lodi Dodgers ended the 1976 California League season with a record of 64–76 to end the regular season in fifth place in the six-team league. Playing the season under manager Jimmy Williams, Lodi finished 27.0 games behind the first place Salinas Angels in the overall standings. Lodi did not qualify for the playoff won by the Reno Silver Sox over Salinas Angels. Lodi Dodgers pitcher Greg Heydeman led the California League pitchers with 159 strikeouts.

In 1977, the Lodi Dodgers captured the California League championship, as the league continued play as with six-teams in the Class A level league. Lodi ended the regular season with an overall record of 81–59 to finish in second place, playing under manager Stan Wasiak, who began a three-season tenure as the Lodi manager. Lodi ended the season 2.0 games behind the Fresno Giants in the overall league standings. The Dodgers became the California League champions in the six-team league as Lodi first won the second half of the split season and the Salinas Angels won the first half title. In the final, the Lodi Dodgers swept Salinas in three games to complete their championship run.

Lodi Dodger Rudy Law won the 1977 California League batting championship, hitting .386 for the season. His Lodi teammate Kelly Snider led the California League with both 36 home runs and 139 RBI. A First baseman, Snider was named as the California League M.V.P. and Stan Wasiak was named the California State League manager of the year. It was chronicled that Baseball Hall of Fame member Rickey Henderson, who played for the Modesto A's at the time, was impressed with Rudy Law and adopted certain aspects of Law's batting stance.

In 1978, the California League expanded back to eight teams and Lodi advanced to the league finals in defending their championship. Abandoning the former split season schedule, the Class A level California League created a "North Division" and "South Division," with four teams in each division. Lodi was placed in the North Division. The Dodgers ended the 1978 season with an 85–55 record, which was second best in the league and Lodi won the North Division title, finishing 22.0 games ahead of the second place Stockton Mariners. Playing under returning manager Stan Wasiak, Lodi lost in finals to the South Division champion Visalia Oaks (97–42) 3 games to 2 in the best of five game series. In 1978, Lodi had two triple plays in one game. On July 25, 1975, in a game against the Fresno Giants. Lodi manager Stan Wasiak was named the California State League Manager of the Year for the second consecutive season.

The Lodi Dodgers fell to sixth place in the 1979 California League overall standings and qualified for the playoffs. Lodi ended the regular season with record of 67–72 and played their final season under manager Stan Wasiak. Lodi placed third in the North Division, finishing 6.0 games behind the first place Reno Silver Sox. Lodi qualified for the playoffs and lost in first round to the Stockton Ports 2 games to 0.

Lodi's Mike Marshall won the California League batting title in 1979, with a .354 average and a league leading 186 total hits. Marshall was named the California League M.V.P. following the season, in which he also hit 24 home runs with 116 RBI. The 6'5" Marshall became an All-Star player for the Los Angeles Dodgers.

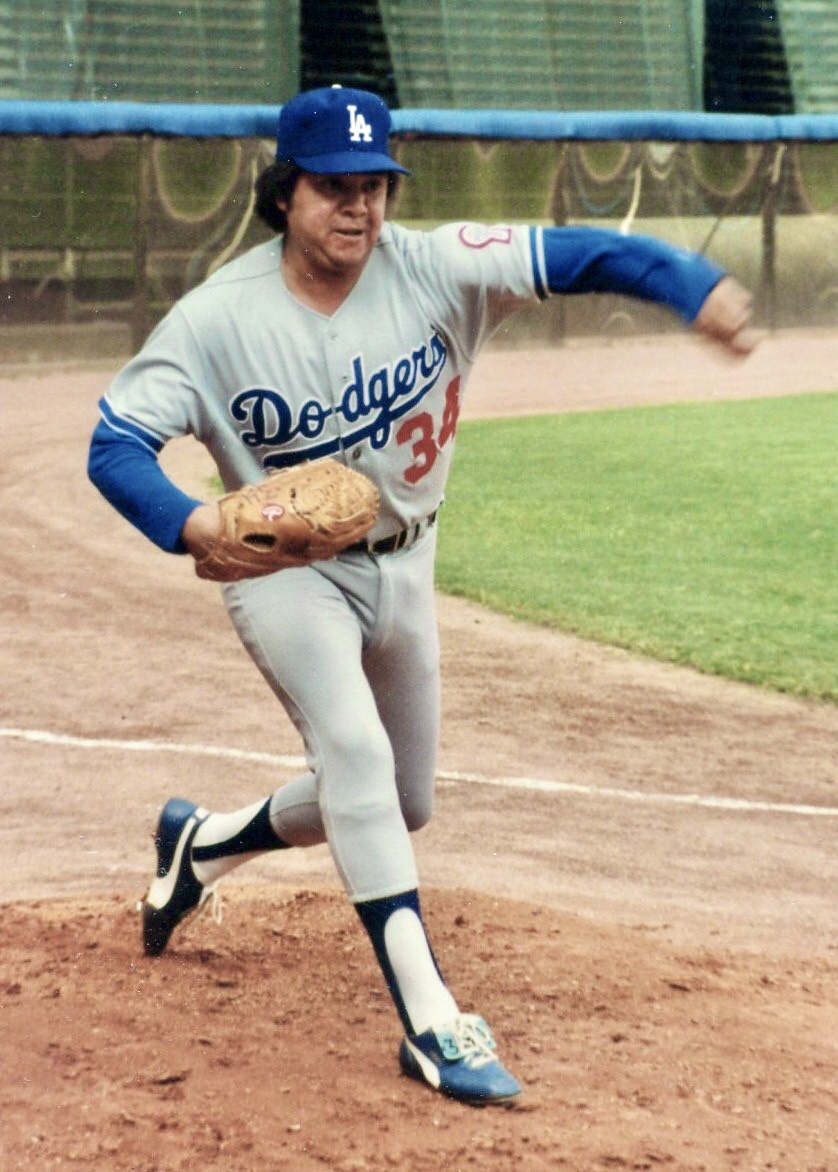
(1981) Fernando Valenzuela, Los Angeles Dodgers. Valenzuela pitched for the 1979 Lodi Dodgers at age 18.

In 1979, Fernando Valenzuela made his Dodgers organization debut with Lodi at age 18. The Dodgers signed Valenzuela on July 6, 1979, for $120,000, obtaining him from the Mexican League. Dodgers scout Mike Brito had seen Valenzuela pitch while scouting another player. The Dodgers Immediately signed Valenzuela and assigned him to Lodi. Pitching for Lodi, Valenzuela was used cautiously by the team after having pitched in the Mexican League. Valenzuela ended the California League season with a 1–2 record and a 1.13 ERA in 3 starts covering 24 innings. Pitcher Bobby Castillo taught Valenzuela him to throw his signature screwball that year. Valenzuela would become the 1981 Rookie of the Year and win the Cy Young Award, making six All-Star teams while pitching for the Los Angeles Dodgers. His #34 is retired by the Dodgers.

The Lodi Dodgers finished as the eighth-place team in the eight-team Class A level 1980 California League with two notable player performances. The Dodgers ended the season with a final regular season record of 57–88, playing the season under manager Dick McLaughlin. Lodi placed fourth and finished 32½ games behind the first place Stockton Ports in the North Division final standings. Lodi did not qualify for the four-team playoffs, won by the Stockton Ports. Despite the Dodgers' last place season, Lodi's Candy Maldonado was named the California League M.V.P. At age 19, Maldonado hit .305 with 25 home runs and 102 RBI with 63 strikeouts in 120 games for Lodi.

Playing for Lodi in 1980, Alan Wiggins had a record setting season. Playing the full season for the Lodi Dodgers, Wiggins batted .288 and scored 108 runs. Wiggins did this while stealing a record 120 bases in 135 games. He established a professional baseball single-season steals record at the time, surpassing the previous minor league mark of 116 set by Allan Lewis in 1966. The 120 stolen bases were more than Lou Brock's major league record of 118 at the time. During the 1980 season, Wiggins was arrested for possession of marijuana. Wiggins died in 1991 at age 32.

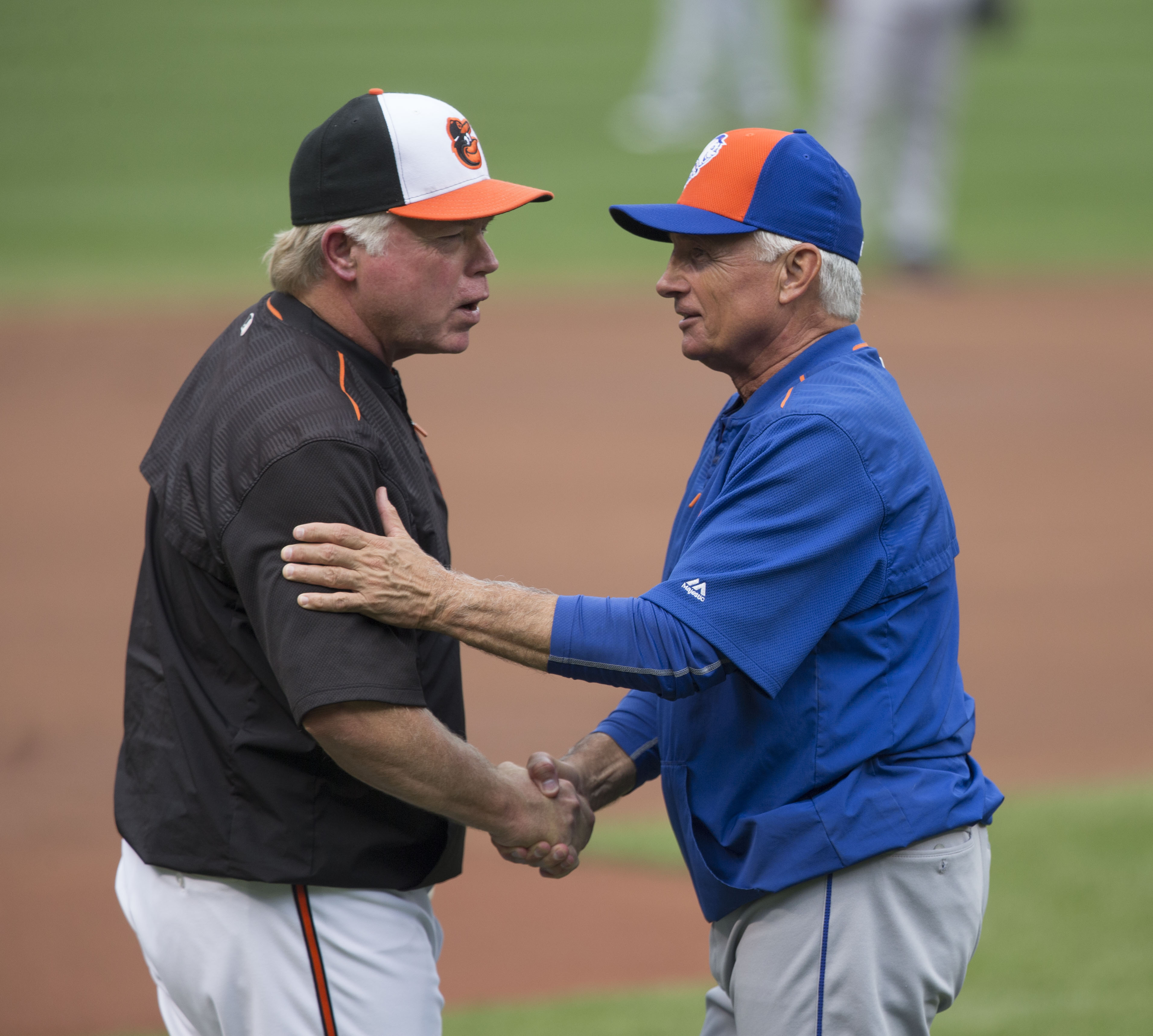
(2015) Buck Showalter and Terry Collins. Collins managed Lodi to the 1981 championship in his first season as a minor league manager.

The Lodi Dodgers went from last place in 1980 to become the 1981 California State League champions. The California State League did not have divisions in 1981 and the top four teams made the playoffs in the Class A level, eight-team league. Lodi ended the regular season with a final record of 73–67, to finish in third place overall. Playing the season under first year manager Terry Collins, Lodi finished 14.0 games behind the first place Visalia Oaks in the regular season standgings and qualified for the playoffs. In the four-team playoffs, Lodi defeated the Reno Silver Sox 2 games to 0 in the first round to advance. In the finals, Lodi defeated Visalia 3 games to 2 to win the Lodi franchise's third California League championship. Lodi won the league title on a walk-off home run by Stu Pederson in game five of the series.

At age 31, Terry Collins was named the 1981 California State League Manager of the Year and received praise from his players for leading Lodi to the league championship. Collins became the manager of the Class A Vero Beach Dodgers in 1982. After a long tenure as a minor league manager, Collins went on to manage the Houston Astros (1994–1996), Anaheim Angels and New York Mets (2011–2017), leading the Mets to the 2015 World Series.

In 1982, the California League expanded to 10 teams, adding the Bakersfield Mariners and San Jose Expos as expansion teams and structured the league into two five team divisions. The Lodi Dodgers ended the 1982 season with a record of 58–82, finishing in ninth place overall, playing under new manager Rick Ollar. Lodi placed fifth and last in the North Division, finishing 36.0 games behind the first place Modesto A's in their division. With their fifth-place division finish, Lodi did not qualify for the playoff won by Modesto over the Visalia Oaks.

Like his predecessor Terry Collins, Rick Ollar was a first-year manager with Lodi, managing at age 30. Ollar had been drafted by the Los Angeles Dodgers out of Oklahoma State University and had a short minor league career. After managing Lodi in 1982, Ollar went on to manage the San Antonio Dodgers in 1983. Ollar died at the age of 40 after a reaction from an insect bite.

The Lodi "Dodgers" franchise played their final season as a Los Angeles Dodgers affiliate in 1983 and placed last in the North Division of the team-team Class A level California State League. The Dodgers ended the season with a record of 60–78, to finish in eighth place overall, Playing the season under manager Don LeJohn, the Dodgers again placed last in the North Division, finishing 19.0 games behind the first place Stockton Ports with their fifth place finish. With their last finish, Lodi did not qualify for the playoffs won by the Redwood Pioneers over Stockton in the final.

=== 1984: Final California League season ===
The Lodi "Crushers" nickname returned in 1984, as Lodi continued California League play in their final season. After the Los Angeles Dodgers moved their affiliation to the Bakersfield Dodgers, Lodi became a minor league affiliate of the Chicago Cubs in what was Lodi's final minor league season in the California League. Lodi ended their final season with a 58–82 record and were in ninth place overall under manager Junior Kennedy. Kennedy was former player of the year in the California League for the 1969 Stockton Ports. Lodi placed fifth and last in the North Division for the third consecutive season, finishing 22½ games behind the first place Redwood Pioneers. Lodi did not qualify for the playoffs won by the Modesto A's over the Bakersfield Dodgers, who were managed by Don LeJohn.

In 1985, the Chicago Cubs did not continue their affiliate partnership with Lodi. Without a new affiliate, Lodi owner Michelle Sprague folded the team for the 1985 season and the California League played with nine teams in Lodi's absence. Sprague then sold the franchise to a group that included former L.A. Dodger player Ken McMullen and the new group returned the franchise to play in the 1986 California League as the newly formed Ventura County Gulls under an ownership group including actor Mark Harmon. The franchise moved to San Bernardino, California in 1987, and began play as the San Bernardino Spirit, who evolved to become today's Rancho Cucamonga Quakes. Today, both Rancho Cucamonga and the Inland Empire 66ers, based in San Bernardino continue play as members of the Class A level California League. Lodi has not hosted another minor league team.

== The ballpark ==
The Lodi California League minor league teams hosted home games at Lawrence Park. The ballpark had field dimensions of (Left, Center, Right): 325-390-325 (1971). Today, the ballark has been renamed as Tony Zupo Field. In 2019, the ballpark was restored after an arson fire. Zupo Field is located at 350 North Washington Street in Lodi, California.

== Timeline ==
| Year(s) | # Yrs. | Team | Level | League | Affiliate | Ballpark |
|---|---|---|---|---|---|---|
| 1966–1968 | 3 | Lodi Crushers | Class A | California League | Chicago Cubs | Lawrence Park |
| 1969 | 1 | Lodi Crushers | Class A | California League | Oakland Athletics | Lawrence Park |
| 1970–1971 | 2 | Lodi Padres | Class A | California League | San Diego Padres | Lawrence Park |
| 1972 | 1 | Lodi Orions | Class A | California League | Baltimore Orioles | Lawrence Park |
| 1973 | 1 | Lodi Lions | Class A | California League | Baltimore Orioles | Lawrence Park |
| 1974–1975 | 2 | Lodi Orioles | Class A | California League | Baltimore Orioles | Lawrence Park |
| 1976–1983 | 8 | Lodi Dodgers | Class A | California League | Los Angeles Dodgers | Lawrence Park |
| 1984 | 1 | Lodi Crushers | Class A | California League | Chicago Cubs | Lawrence Park |

== Year-by-year records ==
| Year | Record | Finish | Manager | Playoffs/Notes |
Lodi Crushers (California League)
| 1966 | 59–81 | 7th | Don Elston (25–42) / Ray Perry (37–39) | No playoffs held |
| 1967 | 63–77 | 6th | Walt Dixon | Did not qualify |
| 1968 | 75–65 | 3rd | Jim Marshall / Al Heist | Did not qualify |
| 1969 | 57–83 | 8th | Billy Klaus (43-62) / Warren Hacker (8-6) / Eli Grba (6-15) | Did not qualify |
Lodi Padres
| 1970 | 43–97 | 8th | Sonny Ruberto / Ken Bracey | No playoffs held |
| 1971 | 65–74 | 6th | George Freese | Did not qualify |
Lodi Orions
| 1972 | 67–73 | 6th | Jimmie Schaffer | Did not qualify |
Lodi Lions
| 1973 | 77–63 | 1st (t) | Jimmie Schaffer | Won 1st half pennant League champions |
Lodi Orioles
| 1974 | 61–79 | 6th (t) | Jimmie Schaffer | Did not qualify |
| 1975 | 71–69 | 3rd | Bobby Malkmus | No playoffs held |
Lodi Dodgers
| 1976 | 64–76 | 5th | Jimmy Williams | Did not qualify |
| 1977 | 81–59 | 2nd | Stan Wasiak | Won 2nd half pennant League champions |
| 1978 | 85–55 | 2nd | Stan Wasiak | Won North Division pennant Lost in finals |
| 1979 | 67–72 | 6th | Stan Wasiak | Lost in 1st round |
| 1980 | 57–88 | 8th | Dick McLaughlin | Did not qualify |
| 1981 | 73–67 | 3rd | Terry Collins | League champions |
| 1982 | 58–82 | 9th | Rick Ollar | Did not qualify |
| 1983 | 60–78 | 8th | Don LeJohn | Did not qualify |
Lodi Crushers
| 1984 | 58–82 | 9th | Junior Kennedy | Did not qualify |

== Notable alumni ==
- Johnny Abrego (1984)
- Vic Albury (1970)
- Rob Andrews (1972)
- Bob Bailor (1972)
- Dann Bilardello (1980–1981)
- Mark Bradley (1977–1979)
- Tony Brewer (1981)
- Greg Brock (1980)
- Rick Bladt (1966)
- Randy Bobb (1966)
- Ken Bracey (1970, MGR)
- Bobby Brown (1974–1975)
- Jophery Brown (1967–1968)
- Mike Caldwell (1971) Milwaukee Brewers Wall of Honor
- Mike Capel (1984)
- Jim Colborn (1967–1968) MLB All-Star
- Terry Collins (1981, MGR)
- Mike Darr (1975)
- Bob Davis (1971)
- Joe Decker (1966–1968)
- Jon Debus (1976)
- Alec Distaso (1967)
- Walt Dixon (1967, MGR)
- Blake Doyle (1973)
- Randy Elliott (1970–1971)
- Don Elston (1966, MGR) 2x MLB All-Star
- Steve Engel (1984)
- Darcy Fast (1968)
- George Freese (1971, MGR)
- Bob Galasso (1972)
- Kiko Garcia (1973)
- Ralph Garcia (1970–1971)
- José González (1983)
- Eli Grba (1968, MGR)
- Johnny Grubb (1971) MLB All-Star
- Brad Gulden (1977)
- Warren Hacker (1968, MGR)
- Johnny Hairston (1967)
- Drew Hall (1984)
- Dave Hamilton (1969)
- Jeff Hamilton (1983)
- Larry Hardy (1970–1971)
- Larry Harlow (1972–1973)
- Al Heist (1968, MGR)
- George Hendrick (1969)
- Ubaldo Heredia (1976–1978)
- Jesús Hernáiz (1968)
- Leo Hernández (1979)
- Greg Heydeman (1976)
- George Hildebrand (1905)
- Dave Hilton (1971)
- Brian Holton (1979)
- Gail Hopkins (1966)
- Mike Howard (1977)
- Mike Ivie (1971)
- Pat Jacquez (1967)
- Garry Jestadt (1967)
- Gary Jones (1984)
- Junior Kennedy (1984, MGR)
- Billy Klaus (1969, MGR)
- Tom Klawitter (1981)
- Hide Koga (1968)
- Ron Law (1967–1968)
- Rudy Law (1977)
- Don LeJohn (1983, MGR)
- Jeffrey Leonard (1976)
- Allan Lewis (1969)
- Frankie Librán (1968, 1970)
- Q. V. Lowe (1967)
- Morris Madden (1982)
- Candy Maldonado (1976)
- Bobby Malkmus (1975, MGR)
- Jim Marshall (1968, MGR)
- Mike Marshall (1979) MLB All-Star
- Larry McCall (1975–1973)
- Byron McLaughlin (1974)
- Randy Miller (1974)
- Rafael Montalvo (1982)
- Rich Nye (1966)
- Jerry Nyman (1971)
- Mike Parrott (1974)
- Dave Patterson (1977)
- Stu Pederson (1981)
- Jeff Pentland (1971)
- Jack Perconte (1976–1977)
- Ray Perry (1966, MGR)
- Ted Power (1976)
- Frank Reberger (1967)
- Sonny Ruberto (1970, MGR)
- Jim Qualls (1966–1967)
- Mike Ramsey (1983)
- Gilberto Reyes (1982)
- R. J. Reynolds (1980, 1982)
- Germán Rivera (1979, 1981)
- Ron Roenicke (1978)
- Rolando Roomes (1984)
- Willie Royster (1975)
- Ken Rudolph (1966–1967)
- Dick Ruthven (1984) 2x MLB All-Star
- Reggie Sanders (1969)
- Scott Sanderson (1984)
- Dave Sax (1980)
- Jimmie Schaffer (1972–1974, MGR)
- Dave Skaggs (1973)
- John Scott (1971)
- Al Severinsen (1966)
- Steve Simpson (1971)
- Steve Shirley (1977–1978)
- John Shoemaker (1978–1979)
- Dan Spillner (1971)
- John Strohmayer (1969)
- Mike Stone (1978)
- Bill Stoneman (1966) MLB All-Star
- Bob Terlecki (1966–1967)
- Fernando Valenzuela (1979) #34 Retired by Los Angeles Dodgers
- Joe Vavra (1976)
- Max Venable (1978)
- Stan Wasiak (1977–1979, MGR)
- Myron White (1977)
- Alan Wiggins (1980)
- Jim Williams (1966, 1971)
- Don Young (1968)

== See also ==
- Lodi Dodgers players
- Lodi Padres players
- Lodi Orioles players
- Lodi Crushers players
- Lodi Lions players
- Lodi Orions players
- List of California League champions
