= Santa Clara Padres =

- 1979; Santa Clara, California

Minor league affiliations
- Class: Class A-Short Season (1979)
- League: California League (1979)
- Division: North

Major league affiliations
- Team: Independent

Team data
- Name: Santa Clara Padres (1979)
- Colors: Cardinal, green, white
- Ballpark: Washington Park; San Jose Municipal Stadium
- Owner/ Operator: Thomas Leonard

The Santa Clara Padres were a Minor League Baseball team in the Class A-Short Season California League, based in Santa Clara, California. The franchise played a single season as an independent club before moving north to become the Redwood Pioneers.

== History ==
The history of the Santa Clara Padres is entangled with the San Jose Missions. San Jose was without a team after the franchise playing as the AAA San Jose Missions was sold and relocated to Ogden, Utah following the 1978 season. Joe Gagliardi, who had operated the Missions under a lease agreement, led a group that would place a California League team in San Jose. The expansion franchise signed a played development contract with the Seattle Mariners and brought the league to nine teams. Seeking an even ten team circuit, Gagliardi convinced Vallejo cardiologist Dr. Thomas Leonard to back another expansion club. From the onset the franchise faced challenges. Leonnard was unable to secure an affiliation with a major league team, relegating the team to operate as a co-op club. The California Angels, Milwaukee Brewers, Oakland A’s, St. Louis Cardinals, Seattle Mariners and San Diego Padres provided players. The Padres even loaned their name to the team despite lack of true affiliation. The team even held open tryouts to fill out the roster. The club initially sought Vallejo and Santa Rosa as their home, but were turned away when it was evident that facility upgrades would not be ready in time for the season. The franchise settled in Santa Clara, which coincidentally neighbors San Jose were their expansion counterpart was located. Ultimately, the Missions front office assumed the Padres' front office operations.

The club's struggles continued on the field. The Padres lost twenty-one of their first twenty-two games. The team finished the year in last place in their division with a record of 47-93. Without a true how venue the club's woes continued at the gate. It was common for the games to have less than fifty fans in the stands. The Padres attendance for the year fell shy of twenty thousand.

Following the season owner Thomas Leonard began seeking a new home for his team. Leonard reached an agreement with Rohnert Park city leaders that included funding for new stadium. The franchise relocated to Rohnert Park, taking the name Redwood Pioneers.

== Ballpark ==
The Padres home facility was the venerable Washington Park. Built in 1935 the park had a capacity just over one thousand. However, due to scheduling conflicts, only twenty dates were available for the team. The Padres were forced to use San Jose Municipal Stadium as the site of the majority of their "home" games.

== Notable players ==
Joe Maddon
Ron Tingley

== Season-by-season record ==
Season	PDC	Division	Finish	Wins	Losses	Win%	Postseason	Manager	Attendance
Santa Clara Padres
1979		North	5th	47	93	.336		Joseph Volpi	19,952

Preceded by Expansion franchise	California League franchise (1979)	Succeeded by Redwood Pioneers
