= San Jose Missions =

- 1977–1981; San Jose, California

Minor league affiliations
- Class: Class A-Advanced (1979-1981)
- Previous classes: AAA (1977-1978)
- League: California League (1979-1981)
- Division: South (1978-1980)
- Previous leagues: Pacific Coast League (1977-1978)

Major league affiliations
- Team: Independent (1981)
- Previous teams: Seattle Mariners (1978-1980); Oakland Athletics (1977)

Minor league titles
- League titles (1): 1979
- Division titles (1): 1979

Team data
- Colors: Kelly green, athletic gold, white (1977); Royal blue, gold, white (1978-1980)
- Ballpark: San Jose Municipal Stadium

The San Jose Missions were a minor league baseball team located in San Jose, California. The Missions played from 1977 to 1978 as members of the AAA Pacific Coast League. The Missions name returned in 1979 under a new franchise that played in the Class A-Advanced California League. In 1982, with a new affiliation, the club was renamed the San Jose Expos.

== History ==
The history of the Missions is a tale of two franchises linked by a common owner. The initial Missions club came into existence with Joe Gagliardi, owner of the San Jose Bees, making a deal to lease the AAA Pacific Coast league Sacramento franchise from Bob Piccinini. Piccinini's Solons were without a ballpark as Hughes Stadium was in poor condition and had failed to meet earthquake standards. Gagliardi relocated the club to San Jose for the 1977 where the team played as an affiliate of the Oakland Athletics. Former A's player Rene Lachemann was tabbed as manager. The Missions served as the A's taxi squad with players being shuttled to Oakland throughout the season. The team trudged to 64-80 finish.

The team returned in 1978 as an affiliate of the Seattle Mariners. This was the Mariners' first dedicated AAA team. Rene Lachemann, who would go on to manage the Mariners from 1981-1983, returned as manager. The Missions finished year at the bottom of the league in both the standings and attendance. Following the season, owner Bob Piccinini ended his lease of the club and sold it for a reported $175,000 to Dennis Job. Job promptly moved the franchise to Utah where they would become the Ogden A's.

With San Jose vacant, Joe Gagliardi gained approval for a California League team. The club signed an affiliation the Seattle Mariners. Gagliardi resurrected the Missions name as the club accompanied the Santa Clara Padres in the expansion of the California League in 1979. With a roster that included Dave Henderson, Orlando Mercado, and Jim Maler the Missions won the south division title with a record of 89-51. The Missions advanced past the Visalia Oaks in divisional round of the playoffs. San Jose faced the Stockton Ports in the best of five games league championship series. The Missions bested the Ports in a series that went the full tilt to claim the California League crown. The Missions and Mariners continued their relationship into 1980. San Jose finished the year at 73-66, only a half game behind the south division leading Fresno Giants. Despite a runner-up rerecord, the Missions missed out in the post season as the first half winning Giants and second half winning Oaks advanced under the split season format.

The Missions played the 1981 season as independent club. The team finished the year at 53-87, placing last in a single division California League that had dropped to an eight team circuit. Following the season the franchise was sold to Ohio businessman, Peter Kern. In signing a player development contract with the Montreal Expos. The club adopted their parent club's moniker becoming the San Jose Expos.

== Ballpark ==
The Missions played at San Jose Municipal Stadium, now known as Excite Ballpark. The stadium is in use today as home of the San Jose Giants.

== Season Records ==
Pacific Coast League

Year	Record	Finish	Manager	Attendance
1977	64-80	4th East	Rene Lachemann	88,265
1978	53-87	5th East	Rene Lachemann	67,037

California League

Year	Record	Finish	Manager	Attendance
1979	89-51	1st South	Bob Didier	71,320
1980	73-66	2nd South	Bill Plummer	58,132
1981	53-87	8th	Fred Hatfield	99,701
