= Stockton Mariners =

- (1978); Stockton, California

Minor league affiliations
- Class: Class A-Advanced
- League: California League
- Division: North

Major league affiliations
- Previous teams: Seattle Mariners

Team data
- Colors: Royal blue, gold, white
- Ballpark: Billy Hebert Field

The Stockton Mariners were a minor league baseball team located in Stockton, California. The Mariners played in the Class A-Advanced California League for a single season in 1978.

== History ==
Professional baseball returned to Stockton following a five-year absence. Stockton was a charter member of the California League with the most recent franchise relocating to Visalia following the 1972 season. The new Stockton franchise was owned by Joe Gagliardi, who simultaneously was operating the San Jose Missions under a lease agreement. Stockton signed an affiliation with the Seattle Mariners and adopted their parent club's namesake. Stockton native, Mike Pereira, was named general manager. Bobby Floyd, who had led the Seattle's short-season affiliate in Bellingham to a league championship the previous year was tabbed as manager. The Mariners finished second in the north division standings with a record of 63–77.

Following the season the club ended their working arrangement with Seattle and signed on with the Milwaukee Brewers. With the new affiliation the team reverted to its long standing moniker, the Ports.

== Ballpark ==
The Mariners played at Billy Hebert Field. The facility is in use today available to the public for various levels of play.

== Season Records ==
Year	Record	Finish	Manager	Attendance
1978	63-77	2nd North	Bobby Floyd	35,670
