= Champ Summers =

American baseball player (1946–2012)

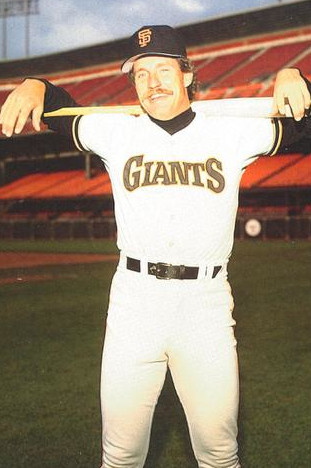
- Summers in 1983
- Outfielder / Designated hitter
- Born: June 15, 1946; Bremerton, Washington, U.S.
- Died: October 11, 2012 (aged 66); Ocala, Florida, U.S.
- Batted: Left Threw: Right

MLB debut
- May 4, 1974, for the Oakland Athletics

Last MLB appearance
- September 30, 1984, for the San Diego Padres

MLB statistics
- Batting average: .255
- Home runs: 54
- Runs batted in: 218
- Stats at Baseball Reference

Teams
- As player: Oakland Athletics (1974); Chicago Cubs (1975–1976); Cincinnati Reds (1977–1979); Detroit Tigers (1979–1981); San Francisco Giants (1982–1983); San Diego Padres (1984); As coach: New York Yankees (1989–1990)

John Junior "Champ" Summers (June 15, 1946 – October 11, 2012) was an American Major League Baseball outfielder and first baseman for six teams during his eleven-year career that spanned from 1974 to 1984. Summers played with the Oakland Athletics, Chicago Cubs, Cincinnati Reds, Detroit Tigers, San Francisco Giants and San Diego Padres.

== Early career ==
Summers, who was born in Bremerton, Washington, served in the United States Army in the Vietnam War and was a recipient of the Purple Heart, did not play his first Major League Baseball game until he was 28 years old. He was signed by the Oakland Athletics as an amateur free agent in 1971, after being discovered in a men's softball league following his service in Vietnam.

Summers came from a family of athletes, with a father who was a prizefighter in the United States Navy and a mother who was a pro bowler. Summers received his nickname "Champ" from his father: "Dad took one look at me when I was born and said, 'He looks like he's just gone 10 rounds with Joe Louis.'"

Summers played two years of basketball and one of baseball at Southern Illinois University Edwardsville before leaving for his professional baseball career. He is a member of SIUE's Athletics Hall of Fame.

== Playing career ==
Summers bounced between the minors and majors, mostly as a pinch hitter, until Detroit acquired him in 1979.

Champ's best seasons were 1979 and 1980, when he hit 38 of his 54 career home runs and 121 of his 218 career RBIs. In 1979, he hit a career high 21 home runs, batted .291 with a .401 on-base percentage and a .556 slugging percentage for a .956 OPS. Summers had five RBIs in a single game in May 1979. In 1980, he had another big year, batting .297 with a .393 on-base percentage, .504 slugging percentage and .897 OPS. Summers performance dropped off substantially in 1981, batting .255 with only 3 home runs.

On March 4, 1982, the Tigers traded Champ to the San Francisco Giants for Enos Cabell and cash. After two seasons with the Giants, he was traded to the San Diego Padres, where he played his final season in 1984. Summers only hit .185 for the 1984 National League Champion San Diego Padres, mostly as a pinch hitter (36 of his 54 at bats came off the bench). His biggest hit of the season was a pinch-hit grand slam on April 10, 1984, off of St. Louis Cardinals right-hander Bob Forsch, propelling the Padres to a 7–3 victory. The game was part of a sizzling 10–2 start to the season, as the Padres captured the club's first division title.

While with the Padres, Summers was one of the central figures in a series of bench-clearing brawls in a game at Atlanta on August 12, 1984. At one point, Summers charged toward the Braves dugout looking to take on pitcher Pascual Pérez, who had hit the Padres' Alan Wiggins in the first inning, although Perez had been brushed back by San Diego pitchers Ed Whitson and Craig Lefferts while at bat. Summers was intercepted by injured Atlanta slugger Bob Horner.

Summers ended his playing career playing for the Padres in the 1984 World Series against his former skipper, Sparky Anderson, and his former Detroit Tigers teammates. Summers struck out in his only at bat in the 1984 World Series, which also wound up being his last major league at bat.

Over his eleven-year career, Summers hit for a .255 batting average with 54 home runs and 218 RBIs. In a statistical oddity, both his first and last major league home runs were pinch hit grand slams.

== Coaching Career ==
Summers returned to baseball in the late 1980s as the batting coach for the Yankees' AAA affiliate, the Columbus Clippers. When the manager under whom he served, Bucky Dent, was named Yankees' manager (replacing the fired Dallas Green) near the end of the 1989 season, Summers went to the big leagues with him. Summers acted as the Yankees' hitting coach until Dent was let go during the 1990 season.

Summers' last season in a baseball uniform came in 2001, when he managed the Gateway Grizzlies of the independent Frontier League, retiring from baseball after the season concluded.

== Personal life ==
Summers met his wife, Barbara, while in college. They married in 1971, and divorced in 1982.

He married his second wife, Joy, in 1985. They remained married until his death.

== Death ==
Summers died in Ocala, Florida at age 66 of kidney cancer. He was buried at the Florida National Cemetery in Bushnell, Florida.
