= List of San Diego Padres Opening Day starting pitchers =

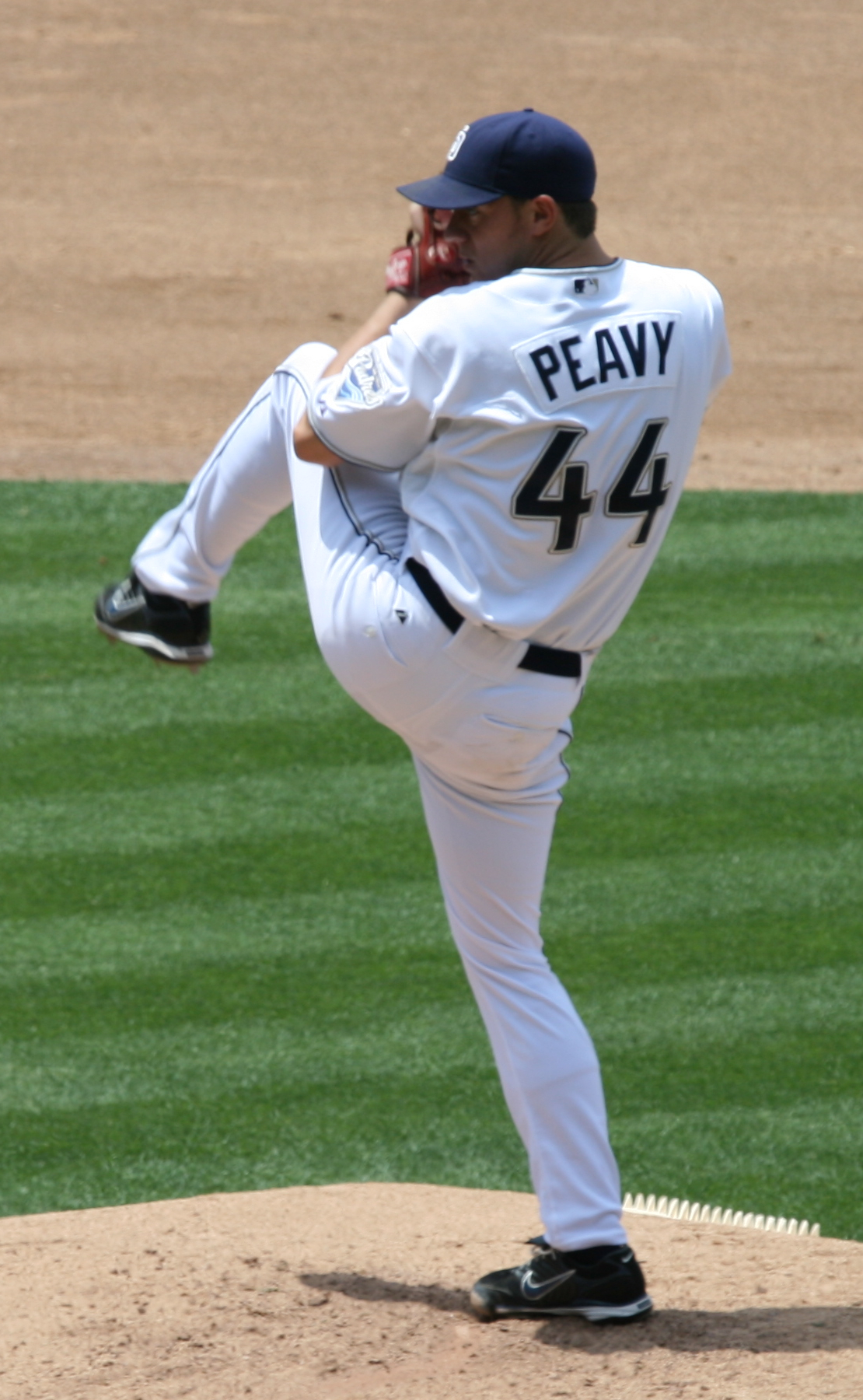
Jake Peavy, the Opening Day starting pitcher 2006–09

The San Diego Padres are an American professional baseball team based in San Diego. The Padres compete in Major League Baseball (MLB) as a member club of the National League (NL) West Division. The Padres first played their home games at San Diego Stadium until 2004, when they moved into Petco Park. The first game of the new baseball season for a team is played on Opening Day, and being named the Opening Day starter is an honor, which is often given to the player who is expected to lead the pitching staff that season, though there are various strategic reasons why a team's best pitcher might not start on Opening Day. The Padres have used 24 different Opening Day starting pitchers in their 42 seasons. The 24 starters have a combined Opening Day record of 15 wins, 14 losses and 13 no decisions. No decisions are only awarded to the starting pitcher if the game is won or lost after the starting pitcher has left the game.

The Padres' first Opening Day starting pitcher was Dick Selma, who received a win against the Houston Astros. Randy Jones, Eric Show and Jake Peavy tie the Padres' record for most Opening Day starts with four. Peavy has the most consecutive Opening Day starts with four (2006–2009). Jones and Andy Benes each have had three consecutive Opening Day starts. Benes has the most consecutive Opening Day losses with three from 1993 to 1995.

Overall, the Padres' Opening Day starting pitchers have a record of eight wins and five losses at San Diego Stadium and two wins and one loss at Petco Park. Although the Padres were nominally the home team on Opening Day 1999, the game was played in Estadio de Béisbol Monterrey in Monterrey, Mexico. The Padres' Opening Day starting pitchers' combined home record is 11 wins and six losses, and their away record is four wins and eight losses. The Padres went on to play in the MLB post-season five times, winning the National League Championship Series (NLCS) in 1984 and 1998. In those five seasons, the Opening Day starting pitchers had a combined record of three wins and 0 losses.

== Key ==
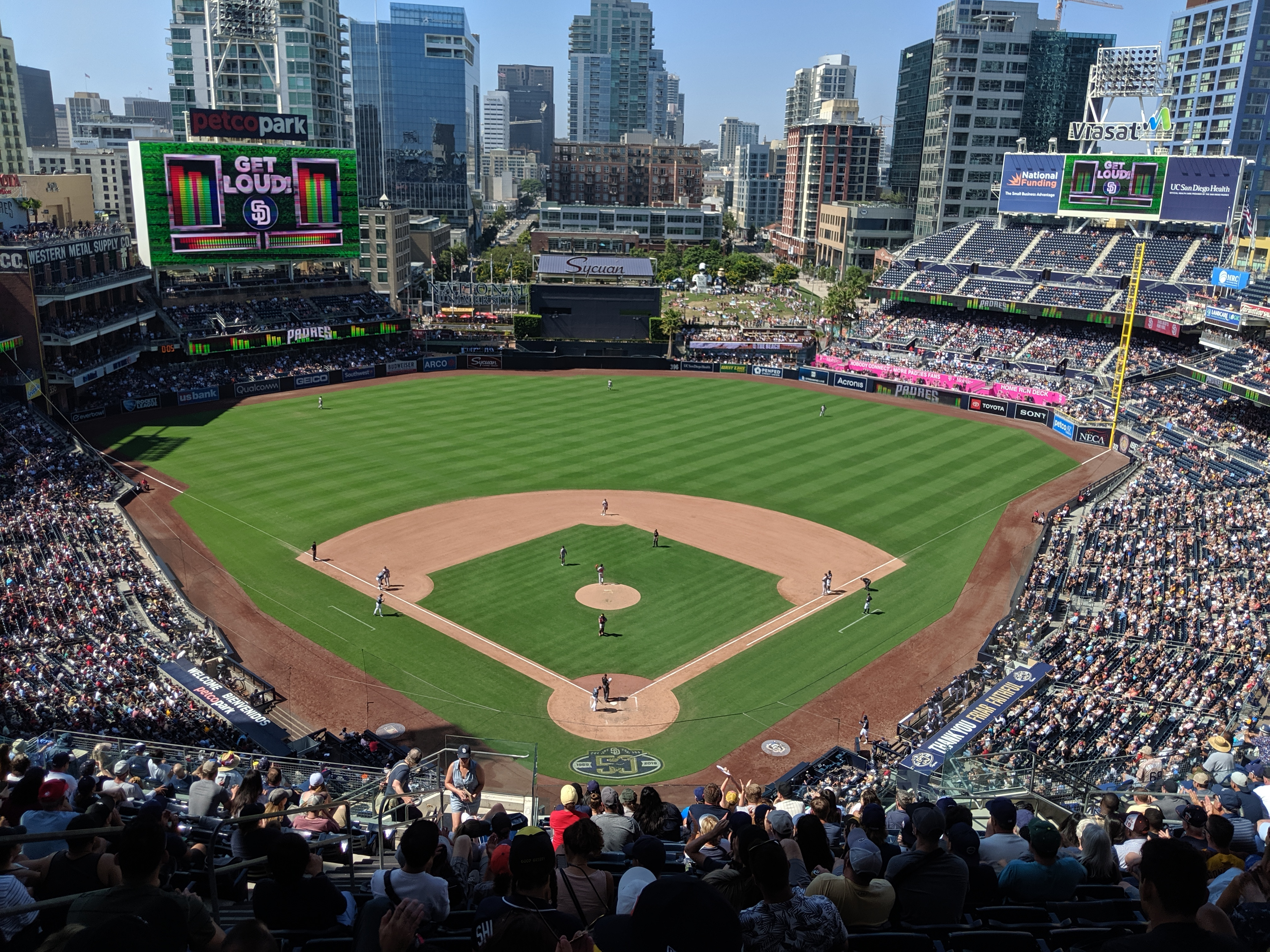
Petco Park, the team's home stadium since 2004

Season	Each year is linked to an article about that particular Padres season.
W	Win
L	Loss
ND (W)	No decision by starting pitcher; Padres won game
ND (L)	No decision by starting pitcher; Padres lost game
Final score (#)	Game score with Padres runs listed first; extra innings are in brackets
Location	**Stadium in bold** for home game
Pitcher (#)	Number of appearances as Opening Day starter with the Padres
*	Advanced to the post-season
**	Won the National League Championship Series

== Pitchers ==
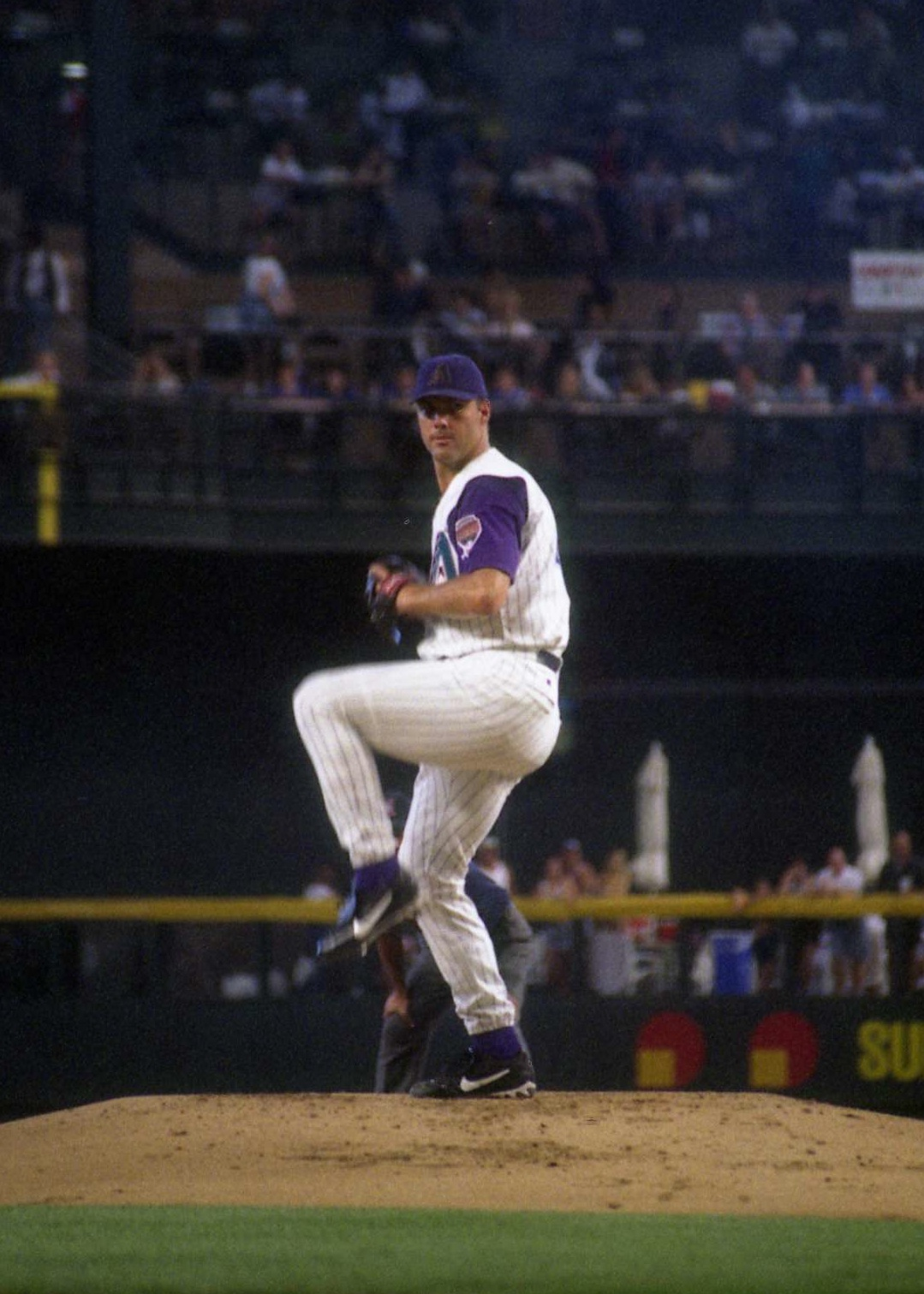
Andy Benes, the Opening Day starting pitcher in 1993, 1994, and 1995

Season	Pitcher	Decision	Final score	Opponent	Location	Attendance	Ref.
1969	Dick Selma	W	2–1	Houston Astros	**San Diego Stadium**	23,370	
1970	Pat Dobson	W	8–3	Atlanta Braves	**San Diego Stadium**	25,125	
1971	Tom Phoebus	L	0–4	San Francisco Giants	**San Diego Stadium**	34,554	
1972	Clay Kirby	W	6–5	Atlanta Braves	**San Diego Stadium**	16,655	
1973	Clay Kirby (2)	W	4–2	Los Angeles Dodgers	**San Diego Stadium**	32,019	
1974	Bill Greif	L	0–8	Los Angeles Dodgers	Dodger Stadium	31,566	
1975	Randy Jones	ND (L)	0–2 (10)	San Francisco Giants	**San Diego Stadium**	17,670	
1976	Randy Jones (2)	W	8–2	Atlanta Braves	**San Diego Stadium**	44,728	
1977	Randy Jones (3)	L	3–5	Cincinnati Reds	Riverfront Stadium	51,937	
1978	Gaylord Perry	ND (W)	3–2	San Francisco Giants	Candlestick Park	36,131	
1979	Gaylord Perry (2)	W	4–3	Los Angeles Dodgers	Dodger Stadium	46,536	
1980	Randy Jones (4)	W	6–4	San Francisco Giants	**San Diego Stadium**	29,535	
1981	John Curtis	ND (W)	4–1	San Francisco Giants	Candlestick Park	54,520	
1982	Juan Eichelberger	L	0–1	Atlanta Braves	**Jack Murphy Stadium**	30,188	
1983	Tim Lollar	W	16–13	San Francisco Giants	Candlestick Park	50,542	
1984**	Eric Show	W	5–1	Pittsburgh Pirates	**Jack Murphy Stadium**	44,553	
1985	LaMarr Hoyt	ND (L)	3–4	San Francisco Giants	Candlestick Park	52,714	
1986	Eric Show (2)	L	1–2	Los Angeles Dodgers	Dodger Stadium	49,444	
1987	Eric Show (3)	ND (L)	3–4 (12)	San Francisco Giants	Candlestick Park	52,020	
1988	Ed Whitson	ND (L)	3–6	Houston Astros	Astrodome	39,906	
1989	Eric Show (4)	L	3–5	San Francisco Giants	**Jack Murphy Stadium**	52,763	
1990	Bruce Hurst	L	2–4	Los Angeles Dodgers	Dodger Stadium	48,686	
1991	Ed Whitson (2)	ND (W)	7–4	San Francisco Giants	**Jack Murphy Stadium**	48,089	
1992	Bruce Hurst (2)	ND (W)	4–3	Cincinnati Reds	Riverfront Stadium	55,356	
1993	Andy Benes	L	4–9	Pittsburgh Pirates	Three Rivers Stadium	44,103	
1994	Andy Benes (2)	L	1–4	Atlanta Braves	**Jack Murphy Stadium**	42,251	
1995	Andy Benes (3)	L	2–10	Houston Astros	**Jack Murphy Stadium**	41,961	
1996*	Andy Ashby	ND (L)	4–5 (10)	Chicago Cubs	Wrigley Field	38,734	
1997	Joey Hamilton	W	12–5	New York Mets	**Jack Murphy Stadium**	43,005	
1998**	Kevin Brown	W	10–2	Cincinnati Reds	Cinergy Field	54,578	
1999	Andy Ashby (2)	L	2–8	Colorado Rockies	Estadio de Béisbol Monterrey	27,104	
2000	Sterling Hitchcock	ND (L)	1–2	New York Mets	Shea Stadium	52,308	
2001	Woody Williams	L	2–3	San Francisco Giants	Pacific Bell Park	40,930	
2002	Kevin Jarvis	ND (W)	0–2	Arizona Diamondbacks	Chase Field	47,025	
2003	Brian Lawrence	ND (L)	2–5	San Francisco Giants	**Qualcomm Stadium**	61,707	
2004	Brian Lawrence (2)	W	8–2	Los Angeles Dodgers	Dodger Stadium	53,850	
2005*	Woody Williams (2)	ND (L)	10–12	Colorado Rockies	Coors Field	47,661	
2006*	Jake Peavy	W	6–1	San Francisco Giants	**Petco Park**	43,767	
2007	Jake Peavy (2)	W	7–0	San Francisco Giants	AT&T Park	42,773	
2008	Jake Peavy (3)	W	4–0	Houston Astros	**Petco Park**	44,965	
2009	Jake Peavy (4)	L	1–4	Los Angeles Dodgers	**Petco Park**	45,496	
2010	Jon Garland	L	3–6	Arizona Diamondbacks	Chase Field	49,192	
2011	Tim Stauffer	ND (W)	5–3	St. Louis Cardinals	Busch Stadium	46,368	
2012	Edinson Volquez	L	3–5	Los Angeles Dodgers	**Petco Park**	42,941	
2013	Edinson Volquez (2)	L	2–11	New York Mets	Citi Field	41,053	
2014	Andrew Cashner	ND (W)	3–1	Los Angeles Dodgers	**Petco Park**	45,567	
2015	James Shields	ND (L)	3–6	Los Angeles Dodgers	Dodger Stadium	53,518	
2016	Tyson Ross	L	0–15	Los Angeles Dodgers	**Petco Park**	44,317	
2017	Jhoulys Chacín	L	3–14	Los Angeles Dodgers	Dodger Stadium	53,701	
2018	Clayton Richard	ND (L)	1–2 (12)	Milwaukee Brewers	**Petco Park**	44,659	
2019	Eric Lauer	W	2–0	San Francisco Giants	**Petco Park**	44,655	
2020*	Chris Paddack	W	7–2	Arizona Diamondbacks	**Petco Park**	0	
2021	Yu Darvish	ND (W)	8–7	Arizona Diamondbacks	**Petco Park**	10,350	
2022*	Yu Darvish (2)	ND (L)	2–4	Arizona Diamondbacks	Chase Field	35,508	
2023	Blake Snell	L	2–7	Colorado Rockies	**Petco Park**	45,103	
2024*	Yu Darvish (3)	ND (L)	2–5	Los Angeles Dodgers	**Gocheok Sky Dome**	15,952	
2025*	Michael King	ND (W)	7–4	Atlanta Braves	**Petco Park**	45,568	
2026*	Nick Pivetta	L	2–8	Detroit Tigers	**Petco Park**	45,673	
