= 1984 Braves–Padres bean brawl =

Baseball brawl between the San Diego Padres and the Atlanta Braves

San Diego Padres	Atlanta Braves
3	5
	1	2	3	4	5	6	7	8	9	R	H	E
San Diego Padres	0	0	0	0	0	0	1	0	2	3	6	0
Atlanta Braves	2	1	0	1	1	0	0	0	X	5	8	1
- Date: August 12, 1984
- Venue: Atlanta–Fulton County Stadium
- City: Atlanta, Georgia, U.S.
- Managers: Dick Williams (San Diego Padres); Joe Torre (Atlanta Braves)
- Umpires: HP: Steve Rippley; 1B: John McSherry (Crew chief); 2B: Fred Brocklander; 3B: Charlie Williams
- Attendance: 23,912
- Time of game: 2:56
- Television: WTBS (Braves); KCST (Padres)
- TV announcers: Braves: Skip Caray (play-by-play); Pete Van Wieren (analysis); Padres: Jerry Coleman (play-by-play); Dave Campbell (analysis)

On August 12, 1984, during an afternoon game at Atlanta–Fulton County Stadium, a series of brawls broke out between the San Diego Padres and the Atlanta Braves over a series of attempted beanings and retaliations. The game ended with a record 13 ejections and also five arrests, with a few spectators getting involved in the ruckus.

== Game play ==
The start of the game was delayed by 90 minutes, due to rain. Braves starting pitcher Pascual Pérez hit Alan Wiggins with the very first pitch of the game, which seemed to put the Padres into retaliatory mode. The Braves went up 2–0 in the bottom of the first on a Claudell Washington homer.

When Perez came to bat in the bottom of the second inning, Padres starter Ed Whitson threw at him as he squared to bunt. Perez responded by wielding his bat and starting toward Whitson, but home plate umpire Steve Rippley restrained him as both benches began to clear. Rippley issued a warning to both teams without any fighting ensuing. The Braves scored another run in the inning to go up 3–0.

In the bottom of the fourth, Whitson threw three straight inside fastballs at Perez, and Rippley ejected both Whitson and manager Dick Williams. Greg Booker replaced Whitson and gave up two more runs before facing Perez in the bottom of the sixth. Then, Booker also threw at Perez and Rippley proceeded to throw both him and acting manager Ozzie Virgil out of the game. In the top of the seventh, Graig Nettles hit a solo homer off Perez, which would incite later activity.

In the bottom of the eighth, Craig Lefferts threw at Perez, and, unlike pitches aimed at Perez in previous innings, Lefferts' pitch made contact, striking Perez in the elbow. Rippley ejected both Lefferts and second acting manager Jack Krol, leaving only Harry Dunlop to manage the rest of the game. At this point, both the Braves' and Padres' dugouts cleared, and the brawl began. First base umpire John McSherry and Padres first baseman Steve Garvey attempted to head off the onslaught, but both were caught in the middle as both teams exchanged punches. The brawl continued for 10 minutes before reserve infielder Champ Summers stormed towards Perez, who had retreated to the Braves' dugout. The Braves' Bob Horner (who was actually on the disabled list with an injured wrist, but dressed in uniform once the initial brawl started) confronted Summers at the front of the dugout, proceeding - with teammate Rick Camp - to wrestle Summers to the ground along with a fan who leaped on top of Summers from the stands. Another fan doused Summers with a drink. On the side, the Padres' Bobby Brown and the Braves' Gerald Perry engaged in a fight of their own. Summers, Brown, Camp, and Perry, along with the Braves' Rick Mahler and Steve Bedrosian (who had been major participants in the initial 10-minute melee), were all ejected.

The relatively calm and uneventful immediate aftermath of the eighth inning scuffle ended at the top of the ninth inning, when Braves' reliever Donnie Moore hit Nettles with the second pitch of the latter's at-bat, sparking yet another fight. Nettles was wrestled to the ground by his former teammate Chris Chambliss (which further actions indicated was likely an act of protection to shield Nettles from other Braves players' assaults) as he came after Moore. Moore continued provoking Nettles to come after him before being attacked by Goose Gossage as he retreated to the dugout; Gossage was wrestled to the ground by manager Joe Torre and other Braves players. Meanwhile, Nettles did attempt to go after Moore again, before being hit hard and tackled a second time by Glenn Hubbard (who years later confirmed he'd blown out his shoulder making the tackle), along with a horde of Braves players. Mahler and Bedrosian, both already ejected from the game, then returned to the field to join in the attack on Nettles, while Perry, also already ejected, went after Tim Flannery. Moore, Nettles, Gossage, and Torre were ejected at that point. Several other players besides Perry from both teams who were ejected after the previous fight risked suspensions by returning to the field to participate.

Fans in the seats behind the Padres' dugout began to taunt the Padres, including Ed Whitson, who had been ejected back in the fourth inning. The fans began to pelt and shower the Padre players with drinks, prompting Kurt Bevacqua to climb to the top of the dugout with a bat. At that moment, a fan leaped onto the field and tried to steal a batting helmet before being tackled by players and detained by security. Finally, Rippley, McSherry, and the umpiring crew ordered those players and coaches not otherwise engaged in the game out of the dugouts and into their clubhouses for the remainder of the game. All fans who participated in the taunting and brawls were detained and arrested.

Once the game finally resumed, Gene Garber pitched the remainder for the Braves with Joe Pignatano acting for Torre. Despite the Padres scoring two additional runs in the ninth, the Braves ultimately prevailed, 5–3.

Fines and suspensions were issued four days later on August 16 to Williams ($10,000, ten days), Summers, Brown, Torre ($1,000), Perry ($700), Bedrosian ($600) and Mahler ($700), who each received three-day suspensions. In addition, Padres coaches Virgil and Krol and players Whitson, Booker, Lefferts, Bevacqua, Flannery, Nettles and Gossage (amounts undisclosed), and Braves Moore ($350) and Pérez ($300) were all fined but not suspended.
