= Ed Whitson =

American baseball player (born 1955)

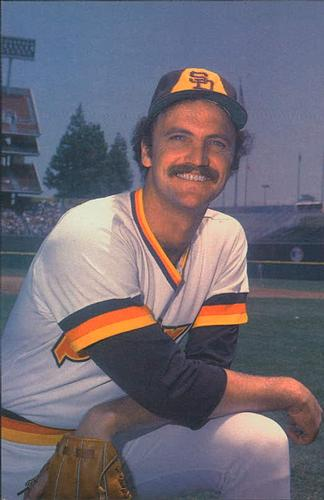
- Pitcher
- Born: May 19, 1955 (age 70); Johnson City, Tennessee, U.S.
- Batted: Right Threw: Right

MLB debut
- September 4, 1977, for the Pittsburgh Pirates

Last MLB appearance
- September 29, 1991, for the San Diego Padres

MLB statistics
- Win–loss record: 126–123
- Earned run average: 3.79
- Strikeouts: 1,266
- Stats at Baseball Reference

Teams
- Pittsburgh Pirates (1977–1979); San Francisco Giants (1979–1981); Cleveland Indians (1982); San Diego Padres (1983–1984); New York Yankees (1985–1986); San Diego Padres (1986–1991)

Career highlights and awards
- All-Star (1980)

Eddie Lee Whitson (born May 19, 1955) is an American former professional baseball pitcher. He played in Major League Baseball (MLB) for the Pittsburgh Pirates, San Francisco Giants, Cleveland Indians, San Diego Padres and New York Yankees from 1977 to 1991. He was selected to the NL All-Star team representing the Giants in 1980.

== Career ==
=== Pittsburgh Pirates ===
The Pittsburgh Pirates selected Whitson in the sixth round of the 1974 Major League Baseball draft out of Unicoi County High School in Erwin, Tennessee. He had a 32–41 win–loss record with a 3.56 earned run average (ERA) in four seasons as a starting pitcher in the Pirates' farm system before making his début with the Pirates as a September call-up in 1977. He went 1–0 with a 3.45 ERA. His one win came on September 17, when he made an emergency start against the Montreal Expos in place of Jerry Reuss, who was a late scratch.

Whitson split the 1978 season between the Pirates and their triple A affiliate, the Columbus Clippers. He made seven starts with Columbus, however, was used strictly out of the bullpen by Pirates manager Chuck Tanner, going 5–6 with a 3.27 ERA as a relief pitcher, and earning four saves.

The Pirates were in fourth place, 6 1/2 games back of the Montreal Expos on June 28, 1979, when Whitson was traded along with Al Holland and Fred Breining to the San Francisco Giants for Bill Madlock, Lenny Randle and Dave Roberts. Madlock batted .328, and was a key member of the "We Are Family" Pirates that surged from fourth place to win the division by two games over the Expos, and go on to win the 1979 World Series over the Baltimore Orioles. For his part, Whitson was 2–3 with a 4.37 ERA splitting time between the bullpen and starts for the Pirates. Upon his arrival in San Francisco, Whitson was added to his new team's starting rotation. He went 5–8 with a 3.95 ERA.

=== San Francisco Giants ===
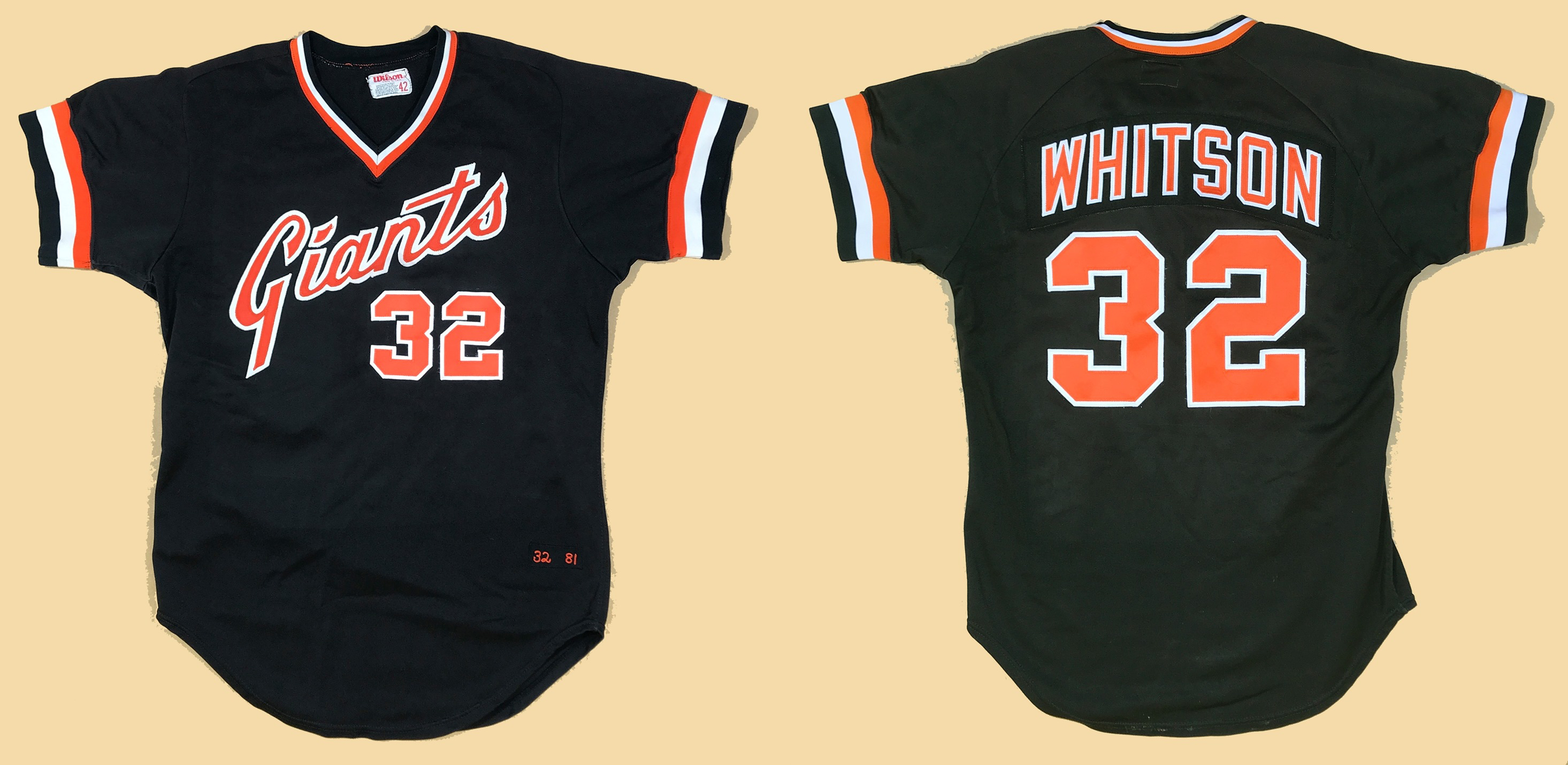
1981 San Francisco Giants #32 Ed Whitson game worn road jersey

Whitson began the 1980 season with an 0–5 record and 5.06 ERA. However, he bounced back, going 7–3 with a 2.32 ERA over his next thirteen starts to earn his only National League All-Star nomination (he did not appear in the game). He finished the season 11–13 with a 3.10 ERA, and making a career high 34 starts and pitching 211 2/3 innings.

Injuries and the 1981 Major League Baseball strike limited Whitson to just 22 starts in 1981, resulting in a 6–9 record and 4.02 ERA.

=== Cleveland Indians ===
Whitson was traded from the Giants to the Cleveland Indians for Duane Kuiper on November 15, 1981. He was converted back into a reliever with Cleveland, going 1–1 with a 4.41 ERA in that role. He made his first start for the Indians in the first game of a double header with the Milwaukee Brewers on August 1, 1982, pitching six innings and giving up just one run to earn the win. He remained in the starting rotation for the remainder of the season, compiling a 3–1 record and 2.22 ERA. Following the season, he was traded to the San Diego Padres for Juan Eichelberger and Broderick Perkins.

=== San Diego Padres ===
In 1983, Whitson was 2–6 with a 4.73 ERA when Padres manager Dick Williams demoted him to the bullpen. He found his way back into the starting rotation by the end of the season, and was 3–0 with a 2.20 ERA upon his return. For the season, he finished at 5–7, compiling a 4.30 ERA with one save.

Whitson had a career year in 1984, going 14–8 with a 3.24 ERA. He was one of eight Padres ejected in a 5–3 loss to the Atlanta Braves at Atlanta–Fulton County Stadium on August 12 of that year. After throwing a second-inning retaliatory pitch behind Pascual Pérez who had hit Alan Wiggins with the very first pitch of the game, he threw three straight inside pitches at Pérez two innings later and was ejected along with Padres manager Dick Williams. Despite his ejection, he reappeared on the field shirtless and wielding a bat while defending his teammates from unruly Braves fans in the ninth during the second of two late-inning bench-clearing brawls. He was fined but not suspended for his actions four days later on August 16.

The Padres ran away with the National League West by twelve games over the Braves to face the Chicago Cubs in the 1984 National League Championship Series. The Cubs won the first two games in Chicago. Facing elimination, Whitson pitched a gem, holding the Cubs to five hits and one run in eight innings. The Padres went on to win games four and five of the NLCS to face the Detroit Tigers in the World Series. Whitson started game two, lasting only two-thirds of an inning, giving up three runs on five hits. The Padres actually came back and won the game, as Andy Hawkins and Craig Lefferts both pitched brilliantly out of the bullpen, holding the Tigers to two hits and no runs from that point forward. Whitson later told family that he was so nervous before the game that he could barely walk to the mound. It was, however, San Diego's only win as the Tigers went on to win the 1984 World Series four games to one.

=== New York Yankees ===
Whitson became a free agent following the 1984 season, and signed a five-year contract with the New York Yankees worth $4.4 million with a sixth-year option. Whitson got off to a terrible start in New York, going 1–6 with a 6.23 ERA in his first eleven starts, and soon became a target for heckling Yankee fans. He began receiving verbal abuse and hate mail, and refused to let his wife, Kathleen, attend home games at Yankee Stadium.

On June 11, 1985, after giving up five hits and one run against the Toronto Blue Jays in Yankee Stadium, Whitson retired the next 19 batters he faced. Fans began to cheer Whitson during the game, and although the game was lost by the bullpen in extra innings, Whitson left the game to a standing ovation in the tenth. From there, Whitson turned his season around, going 9–1 with a 4.55 ERA over his next sixteen starts.

The Yankees were 2 1/2 games behind the first-place Blue Jays in the American League East when Toronto came to town for a four game series on September 12. With the Blue Jays taking two of the first three games, Yankees manager Billy Martin handed Whitson the ball for the fourth game. Whitson gave up four earned runs in just two innings with Toronto winning the game, 8–5, to take a 4 1/2 game lead in the division.

Martin lifted Whitson from his next scheduled start on September 20. On September 22, while at a hotel bar in Baltimore, Whitson and Martin got into a heated argument that spread to other parts of the hotel and resulted in a broken ulna in Martin's right arm and a bruised right side, while Whitson suffered a cracked rib and a split lip. Whitson finished with a 10–8 record and 4.88 ERA. After the season, Martin was fired, which many Yankee fans suspected was because of his altercation with Whitson.

Whitson was used both as a starter and out of the bullpen by new manager Lou Piniella in 1986. Pulled rib muscles caused him to miss time in May. He was 4–0 despite a high 7.36 ERA out of the bullpen, and 1–2 with an 8.71 ERA as a starter. Knowing that Whitson wanted out of New York, the Yankees traded Whitson back to the Padres for reliever Tim Stoddard on July 9, 1986. Tommy John thought that Whitson had trouble handling the intense pressure and media coverage of New York.

=== Second stint with the Padres ===
Used primarily as a starter, Whitson went 11–20 with a 4.89 ERA his first season and a half back in San Diego, largely due to the fact that he led the league in home runs allowed in 1987 with 36. Still traumatized by his experience in New York, Whitson received a death threat prior to a scheduled start against the New York Mets at Shea Stadium in 1987. He made the start, after being escorted to the stadium by National League President A. Bartlett Giamatti and his security team. He was pulled from the game in the fourth inning after giving up six runs. He beat the Mets 1–0 in San Diego two weeks later.

In 1988, Whitson improved to 13–11 and lowered his ERA to 3.77 while allowing only seventeen home runs. In 1989, he won a career-high 16 games with a 2.66 ERA, and in 1990, he went 14–9 with a career-best 2.60 ERA, hitting his only career home run in a complete game victory over the Chicago Cubs.

== Personal life ==
Whitson retired to Dublin, Ohio. He coached for his son's baseball team at Dublin Jerome High School.
