= Juan Eichelberger =

American baseball player (born 1953)

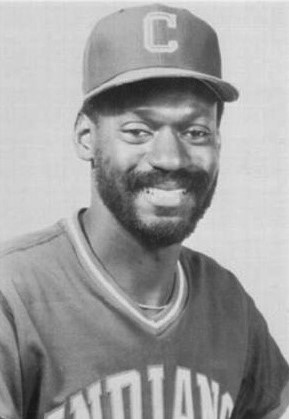
- Eichelberger with the Cleveland Indians in 1983
- Pitcher
- Born: October 21, 1953 (age 73); St. Louis, Missouri, U.S.
- Batted: Right Threw: Right

Professional debut
- MLB: September 7, 1978, for the San Diego Padres
- NPB: April 9, 1989, for the Yakult Swallows

Last appearance
- MLB: June 20, 1988, for the Atlanta Braves
- NPB: May 9, 1989, for the Yakult Swallows

MLB statistics
- Win–loss record: 26–36
- Earned run average: 4.10
- Strikeouts: 281

NPB statistics
- Win–loss record: 0–3
- Earned run average: 7.04
- Strikeouts: 6
- Stats at Baseball Reference

Teams
- San Diego Padres (1978–1982); Cleveland Indians (1983); Atlanta Braves (1988); Yakult Swallows (1989)

Juan Tyrone Eichelberger (born October 21, 1953) is an American former professional baseball player who was a pitcher in Major League Baseball (MLB). He primarily played as a starting pitcher for the San Diego Padres (1978–1982) and was their opening day starter in 1982. He also had with stints with the Cleveland Indians (1983) and Atlanta Braves (1988). Eichelberger also pitched one season in Japan in Nippon Professional Baseball (NPB) for the Yakult Swallows (1989) and two seasons in the Senior Professional Baseball Association (SPBA).

== Early life ==
Eichelberger was born in St. Louis, Missouri, and grew up in San Francisco, where he played baseball at Balboa High School. They won the Academic Athletic Association championship in 1971, with Eichelberger pitching a shutout and driving in the game's only run in a 1–0 championship game win over San Francisco Polytechnic. He was named to the San Francisco Examiner's All-City baseball team.

Eichelberger was selected by the San Francisco Giants in the 36th round of the 1971 MLB draft, but he decided instead to attend the University of California, Berkeley, where he played college baseball for three years with the California Golden Bears. In 1974, he logged a 7–3 record. Expecting to be drafted again, he dropped out of school.

== Professional career ==
=== San Diego Padres ===
Eichelberger was selected by the San Diego Padres in the first round of the 1975 January secondary phase of the MLB draft. Playing Single-A ball that year with Reno, he saw early success, going 10–4 with a 2.77 earned run average (ERA), before he was moved up midseason to Double-A with Alexandria in the Texas League. In Triple-A in 1978, he had an 8–13 record and a 4.50 ERA along with two shutouts for Hawaii. In 156 innings pitched, he led the Pacific Coast League (PCL) with 113 walks. He was called up to the major leagues in September, making his debut with three relief appearances for San Diego that month.

In 1979, Eichelberger thought he had a good spring training with the Padres, allowing two runs in 12 innings, and was disappointed when he was sent down to Hawaii. For the second consecutive season, Eichelberger was the Islanders' opening day starter, and he led the league in walks again with 137 in 195 innings. He had compiled a 13–9 record with 14 complete games and a 3.37 ERA in the PCL, considered a hitter's league, when he was promoted to San Diego. In his second major league start on September 21, he threw a complete game and allowed just four hits in a 3–1 victory over the Los Angeles Dodgers, earning his first win in the majors. He was 1–1 with a 3.43 ERA in three starts for the Padres, and might have had another win were it not for a fielding error against San Francisco on September 29. Eichelberger had exited with San Diego leading 5–2 in the eighth inning, when outfielder Dan Briggs, who entered that inning as a defensive replacement, dropped a ball, which rolled to the fence, allowing the Giants to eventually go ahead 6–5, which they held on to win.

Eichelberger expected to stick with the Padres in 1980, but he began the season with Hawaii again. Due to his late assignment, he was No. 4 in the Islanders' starting rotation. He was 7–3 with a 3.51 ERA and leading the PCL in strikeouts in June, when he was recalled by San Diego to replace an injured Randy Jones. On July 13, he pitched 10 innings and threw 150 pitches in an eventual 4–3 win over the Dodgers in 15 innings. He made 13 starts for the Padres and finished 4–2 with a 3.64 ERA. Eichelberger spent his first full season in the majors in 1981 and developed into a solid starter, leading the Padres in wins with an 8–8 record and a 3.51 ERA. On May 12, he recorded his first major league shutout and did not walk a batter in a 3–0 win over the New York Mets. Eichelberger was a candidate to play in the MLB All-Star Game after going 6–3 with a 2.81 ERA in the first half. However, his performance dropped off after the baseball strike.

Eichelberger was named the Padres' Opening Day starting pitcher for 1982. San Diego lost 1–0 against the Atlanta Braves, whose starter, Rick Mahler, threw a two-hitter. Eichelberger walked eight batters in 6 2/3 innings, allowing the only run in the fifth inning. He combined with Luis DeLeón and Eric Show to throw a four-hitter. On June 2 against the Chicago Cubs, Eichelberger almost threw the Padres' first no-hitter. A questionable call by the official scorer to not charge an error resulted in Scot Thompson being credited with a second-inning single on a ground ball that was not cleanly fielded by Tim Flannery. Eichelberger kept the Cubs hitless over the next seven innings and ended up with a one-hitter, the eighth in San Diego history. The Padres won the game 3–1. On the road against San Francisco on June 25, he allowed two runs in 6 1/3 innings for his first win since the one-hitter. Eichelberger, who was batting .111 at the time, hit a game-winning double in the seventh inning after asking Padres manager Dick Williams not to pinch hit for him despite a 2–2 tie with two outs and a runner on third base. "I don't play that way very often, but Ike had all those people in the stands", said Williams, referring to his 106 relatives and friends at the game.

In July, Eichelberger was demoted to the bullpen after struggling with a 6–9 record and 4.25 ERA, surrendering 18 home runs in 129 innings. He was replaced in the rotation by rookie Andy Hawkins, who had been called up from the minors. In his first relief appearance, Eichelberger injured his shoulder. He was later placed on the 21-day disabled list, retroactive to July 15, due to tendinitis in his right shoulder. By August, fellow veteran starters John Curtis and Chris Welsh were also demoted to the bullpen, with rookies Dave Dravecky and Eric Show joining Hawkins in the rotation. Eichelberger returned on August 9 against Houston, pitching two innings in relief, where Williams said he would remain in the interim. Eichelberger returned to a starting role on September 1, pitching a complete game in a 4–1 win over Pittsburg. He finished the year 7–14 with a 4.20 ERA and eight complete games. After the season, he was traded by the Padres along with first baseman-outfielder Broderick Perkins to the Cleveland Indians for pitcher Ed Whitson. Padres general manager Jack McKeon called Whitson "the pitcher we wanted". Over five seasons in the majors with San Diego, Eichelberger was 20–25 with an ERA of 3.88. He struggled with his control, striking out 212 with 214 walks in 431 innings.

=== Cleveland Indians ===
Indians general manager Phil Seghi had long been interested in Eichelberger. "He has a great arm. Something could click for him and he could become a big winner", Seghi said. Cleveland manager Mike Ferraro said that he had "a great fastball. His problem is consistency, but the raw talent is there." Eichelberger began the 1983 season as a long reliever after losing the No. 5 spot in the starting rotation to rookie Neal Heaton in spring training. Ferraro swapped the pitchers' roles in May, after Eichelberger had pitched 20 innings with a 3.60 ERA. After a number of fine starts, he entered his June 15 matchup against the New York Yankees with a 3–3 record and an ERA of 2.89. The Indians lost the game 8–5, setting off a six-game stretch in which he was 0–6 with a 12.60 ERA, prompting Ferraro to again switch Eichelberger's and Heaton's duties. On July 18, Eichelberger fell to 3–10 after surrendering five runs, including two unearned, in 3 2/3 innings against the Chicago White Sox, during an emergency start in place of Bert Blyleven. Six weeks passed until his next start on August 27, when he allowed four runs and three walks in two innings in a 6–3 loss to Seattle, his eighth consecutive loss as a starter. Eichelberger ended the season 4–11 with a 4.90 ERA, going 2–8 with a 6.33 ERA over the last four months.

In 1984, he was 0–1 with 7.04 ERA in 7 2/3 innings in spring training. He was cut by Cleveland, in favor of pitcher Ernie Camacho, in their final roster move before the start of the season. The Indians owed Eichelberger $300,000 for the remaining year of his two-year guaranteed contract. Manager Pat Corrales said that Seghi and Gabe Paul of the front office preferred Eichelberger due to his experience. According to the manager, Eichelberger declined the option to go to Triple-A. Having spent three consecutive years in the majors, the team needed his permission. "The arm is there, but he is not consistent", Corrales said.

=== Atlanta Braves ===
Eichelberger signed with the Milwaukee Brewers in late April 1984, and returned to the minor leagues for the first time since 1980. He began poorly with their Triple-A Vancouver team, which Eichelberger attributed to not having played in April. He was 0–3 with an 8.70 ERA in six games on May 26, 1984, when he pitched a no-hitter in a 2–0 win over Portland. He walked six and struck out four to help the Canadians sweep a seven-inning doubleheader. He was 8–11 with a 4.96 ERA for Vancouver when they released him in August. Eichelberger was invited to Pittsburgh's spring training in 1985, expecting to be sent to Triple-A Hawaii if he did not make the team. However, he was optioned to the Mexican League, and convinced the Pirates to release him. Eichelberger signed with Single-A Miami of the Florida State League; he was attracted by the independent team's idea to sign former big leaguers—including Mike Torrez, Derrel Thomas, and Eichelberger's former San Diego and Cleveland teammate Broderick Perkins—to drum up interest in the team. After pitching in seven games with a 4.07 ERA, Eichelberger was released, partly due to a conflict with player-pitching coach Torrez.

Eichelberger was then signed by the Atlanta Braves, whose Triple-A Richmond team was down to seven active pitchers and in need of pitching. Converted from a starter to a short reliever, he was 4–1 with a 3.00 ERA in 21 innings when he broke his finger while bunting on July 31, ending his season. He began 1986 with Richmond, but received limited work, and was sent down to Double-A Greenville for 38 days before being recalled to Triple-A. Eichelberger was switched back to a starter in 1987, and finished the season 7–5 with a 3.38 ERA. He also pitched well in the Venezuela winter league with Lara, going 5–4 with a 2.20 ERA.

Eichelberger was re-signed by Atlanta for the 1988 season. The Atlanta Constitution called him an "unlikely but strong candidate to make the staff next season as a long reliever". He was one of 24 pitchers that they invited to spring training. At the time, only eight of the pitchers had thrown more than 100 innings in the majors, and just two had more than 33 big-league wins—Mahler and Bruce Sutter; Eichelberger was a then-career 24–36. The Braves had the worst pitching staff in the National League in 1987, and were looking to fill out their staff while allowing their young prospects to develop in Triple-A. After beginning the season with Richmond, Eichelberger was 0–2 with a 4.82 ERA when he was called up on April 29, 1988, the culmination of four years in the minors and a three-year journey since he was released by Single-A Miami on May 15, 1985. He was added to the bullpen and assumed the role of the team's 10th pitcher, replacing prospect Gary Eave, who returned to Richmond to play regularly. On June 26, the Braves outrighted Eichelberger to Richmond to make room for Germán Jiménez. In 20 appearances with Atlanta, Eichelberger was 2–0 with a 3.86 ERA.

=== Japan and SPBA ===
Eichelberger played in Japan in 1989, joining Larry Parrish on the Yakult Swallows of the Pacific League as their two foreign players allowed on each team.

In 1989–90, Eichelberger played in the SPBA's inaugural season. He was 11–5 with a 2.90 ERA and 70 strikeouts for the West Palm Beach Tropics, who were the Southern Division champions and finished with the league's best record. He was named the starting pitcher on the SPBA All-Star first team, and finished third in voting for the league's most valuable player, won by his teammate Ron Washington. (Note: Steve Henderson of St. Petersburg was second.) Their manager, Eichelberger's former Padres manager Dick Williams, was voted the SPBA Manager of the Year. The Tropics lost the championship game 12–4 to St. Petersburg. Eichelberger allowed eight hits and six earned runs in 4 2/3 innings. He spent spring training with the Milwaukee Brewers in 1990 before being cut. Later that year, he played with the SPBA's Sun City team, but the league suspended operations mid-season in December.

== Player profile ==
Eichelberger was a power pitcher who relied on his fastball and other hard pitches. "He's got good stuff, but he has to realize he doesn't have to throw too hard to get hitters out," said San Diego pitching coach Norm Sherry. Outfielder Jesse Barfield said that Eichelberger threw three types of fastballs and a hard sinker. He struggled to pitch in the strike zone. "He has the arm, but needs better control", said Cleveland manager Pat Corrales. He had 281 strikeouts and 283 walks in 603 1/3 innings over his MLB career, averaging both 4.2 strikeouts and 4.2 walks per nine innings. Eichelberger was inconsistent, throwing a good game followed by a bad one.

Eichelberger was known for his unusual set position. While most pitchers would come to a standing position with their feet together and bring the ball and glove to their chest or chin, Eichelberger would keep his feet spread apart with his knees bent in a crouch and ball and glove at his belt.

Career statistics
Category	W	L	PCT	ERA	G	GS	CG	SHO	SV	IP	H	ER	R	HR	BB	SO	Ref.
MLB	26	36	.419	4.10	125	79	14	1	0	603.1	575	312	275	50	283	281	

== Personal life ==
A Black American, Eichelberger was named Juan at the suggestion of a Puerto Rican nurse at the hospital. The surname Eichelberger is from his great grandfather, who was German and Jewish.

Eichelberger's son Jared followed his father into professional baseball, as a RHP originally drafted by the Chicago Cubs in 2001. Eichelberger became the founder and head instructor at Baseball Science, a baseball training program in San Diego, California.
