= Edinson Vólquez =

Dominican baseball player (born 1983)

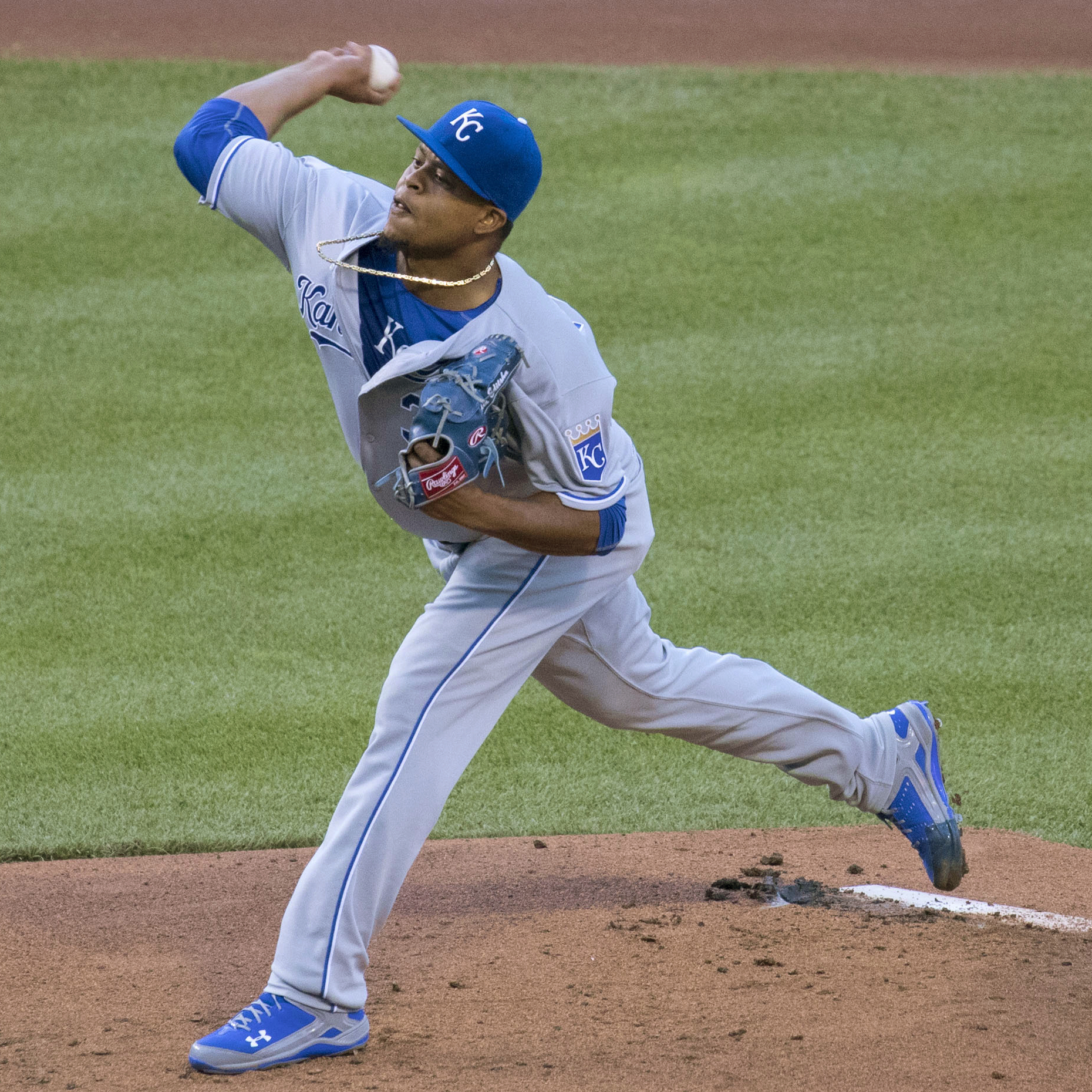
- Vólquez with the Kansas City Royals in 2016
- Pitcher
- Born: July 3, 1983 (age 43); Barahona, Dominican Republic
- Batted: Right Threw: Right

MLB debut
- August 30, 2005, for the Texas Rangers

Last MLB appearance
- August 11, 2020, for the Texas Rangers

MLB statistics
- Win–loss record: 95–89
- Earned run average: 4.45
- Strikeouts: 1,323
- Stats at Baseball Reference

Teams
- Texas Rangers (2005–2007); Cincinnati Reds (2008–2011); San Diego Padres (2012–2013); Los Angeles Dodgers (2013); Pittsburgh Pirates (2014); Kansas City Royals (2015–2016); Miami Marlins (2017); Texas Rangers (2019–2020)

Career highlights and awards
- All-Star (2008); World Series champion (2015); Pitched a no-hitter on June 3, 2017
Medals
Men's baseball
Representing Dominican Republic
World Baseball Classic
Gold medal – first place	2013 San Francisco	Team

Edinson Vólquez (Spanish: [ˈeðinsom ˈbolkes]; (Note: In isolation, Edinson is pronounced [ˈeðinson].) born July 3, 1983) is a Dominican former professional baseball pitcher. He played in Major League Baseball (MLB) for the Texas Rangers, Cincinnati Reds, San Diego Padres, Los Angeles Dodgers, Pittsburgh Pirates, Kansas City Royals, and Miami Marlins.

Vólquez signed with the Rangers in 2001 under the name of Julio Reyes. He went by Edison Vólquez after 2003, before adding an n to his first name in 2007.

== Early life ==
Vólquez grew up in the Dominican Republic and started playing baseball when he was 9 or 10 with the support of his parents. "It was good for me because my mom and dad always took care of me... The only thing I did was go to school and play baseball."

== Professional career ==
=== Texas Rangers ===
Vólquez was signed as an amateur free agent by the Texas Rangers in the Dominican Republic in 2001. Together with John Danks and Thomas Diamond, Vólquez was one third of the "DVD" trio of Rangers pitching prospects.

After spending four years in the Rangers' minor league system, Vólquez made his Major League debut on August 30, 2005, in a start against the Chicago White Sox. He lost all three Major League games he started that season, as well as one of the three games in which he appeared as a reliever, and posted a 14.21 ERA. He spent the first five months of the 2006 season with the Oklahoma RedHawks of the Triple-A Pacific Coast League until he was recalled to the majors in September. This time, he fared better, winning one of his eight starts and posting a 7.29 ERA.

The Rangers were dissatisfied with the results shown by one of their top pitching prospects, so in 2007 they tried an unconventional tactic. Vólquez was demoted to the Bakersfield Blaze of the High-A California League, to work on his control. As Vólquez progressed, he was slowly promoted up through the minor league system until he reached the big leagues in September. This tactic had been used by Mark Connor, the Rangers' pitching coach, once before. Vólquez showed much improvement in his big league performance that season, posting a 2–1 record and 4.50 ERA in six starts. Vólquez later said about the time in the minors, "At the time, I didn't understand, because if I play in the Big Leagues, why do I have to go all the way back to Single-A?... It made me better. It made me a better person."

=== Cincinnati Reds ===
On December 21, 2007, the Rangers traded Vólquez to the Cincinnati Reds, along with Daniel Ray Herrera, in a deal for Josh Hamilton. Vólquez made his Reds' debut on April 6, 2008, in a game against the Philadelphia Phillies in Cincinnati. In 5 1/3 innings of work, he allowed only five hits, one earned run and two walks while striking out eight batters in an 8–2 victory.

Vólquez started 2008 with a 7–1 record and a 1.33 ERA in nine starts, and allowed no more than one earned run in all but one of these starts (in which he allowed two). He became the only Reds pitcher to accomplish this since 1912. On May 18, 2008, Vólquez participated in a pitching matchup with the Cleveland Indians' Cliff Lee, who at that point led the American League with an ERA of 0.67. It was the third time in MLB history that the ERA leaders of each league had faced each other. Vólquez won the contest by a score of 6–4, improving to 7–1. Lee's loss, his first of the season, left him with a 6–1 record.

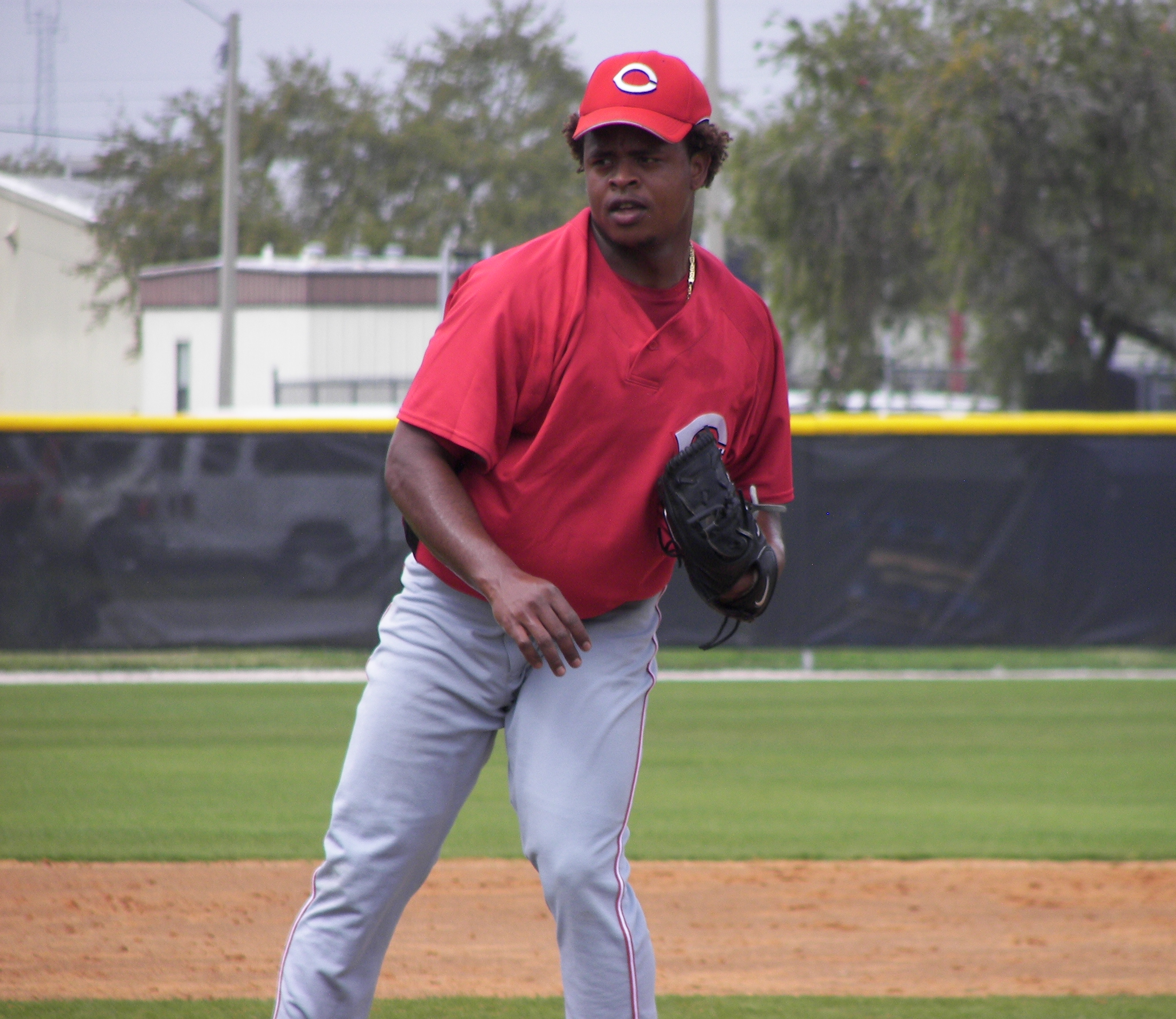
Vólquez with the Cincinnati Reds in 2008 spring training

Vólquez was selected to represent the National League in the 2008 MLB All-Star Game. By the All-Star Break, Vólquez had a 12–3 record with a 2.29 ERA and 126 strikeouts. Vólquez finished the season with a 17–6 record and an earned run average of 3.21 in 196 innings, 8th-best in the National League. His 206 strikeouts tied for second-most in the National League with Johan Santana and Dan Haren, behind the Cy Young winner Tim Lincecum, and his 9.46 K/9 rate was also second in the league behind Lincecum. Vólquez threw changeups 31.9% of the time in 2008, more than any other starter.

After the season, the Baseball Writers' Association of America put Vólquez on the ballot for National League Rookie of the Year Award voting, an award for which he was not eligible. He subsequently received three second place votes for the award, which went to Geovany Soto.

Vólquez did not follow up his 2008 All-Star campaign with the same success. In 2009 with Cincinnati, Vólquez posted a 4–2 record with a 4.35 ERA through June 1. He was placed on the 15-day DL with elbow pain on June 2, and then eventually moved to the 60-day DL in preparation for Tommy John surgery, which ended his season.

On April 20, 2010, he received a 50-game suspension for use of performance-enhancing drugs. Vólquez made his 2010 debut with the Reds on July 17, 2010, vs the Colorado Rockies with an 8–1 win. Vólquez held the Rockies to one earned run and three hits in six innings with 9 strikeouts and 2 base on balls. However, his next several starts were unimpressive, and for the second time in his career, he was demoted straight to single-A (the Dayton Dragons). He was recalled on September 7 and finished the season with a 4–3 record and 4.31 ERA over 62.2 innings. He started Game 1 of the 2010 National League Division Series against the Philadelphia Phillies and lost, allowing four earned over 1.2 innings with Roy Halladay throwing a no-hitter.

Vólquez was the Reds' Opening Day starter in 2011 and finished the season 5–7 with a 5.71 ERA in 20 starts for Cincinnati. He also spent time in the minor leagues, going 4–2 with a 2.37 ERA for Triple-A Louisville.

=== San Diego Padres ===
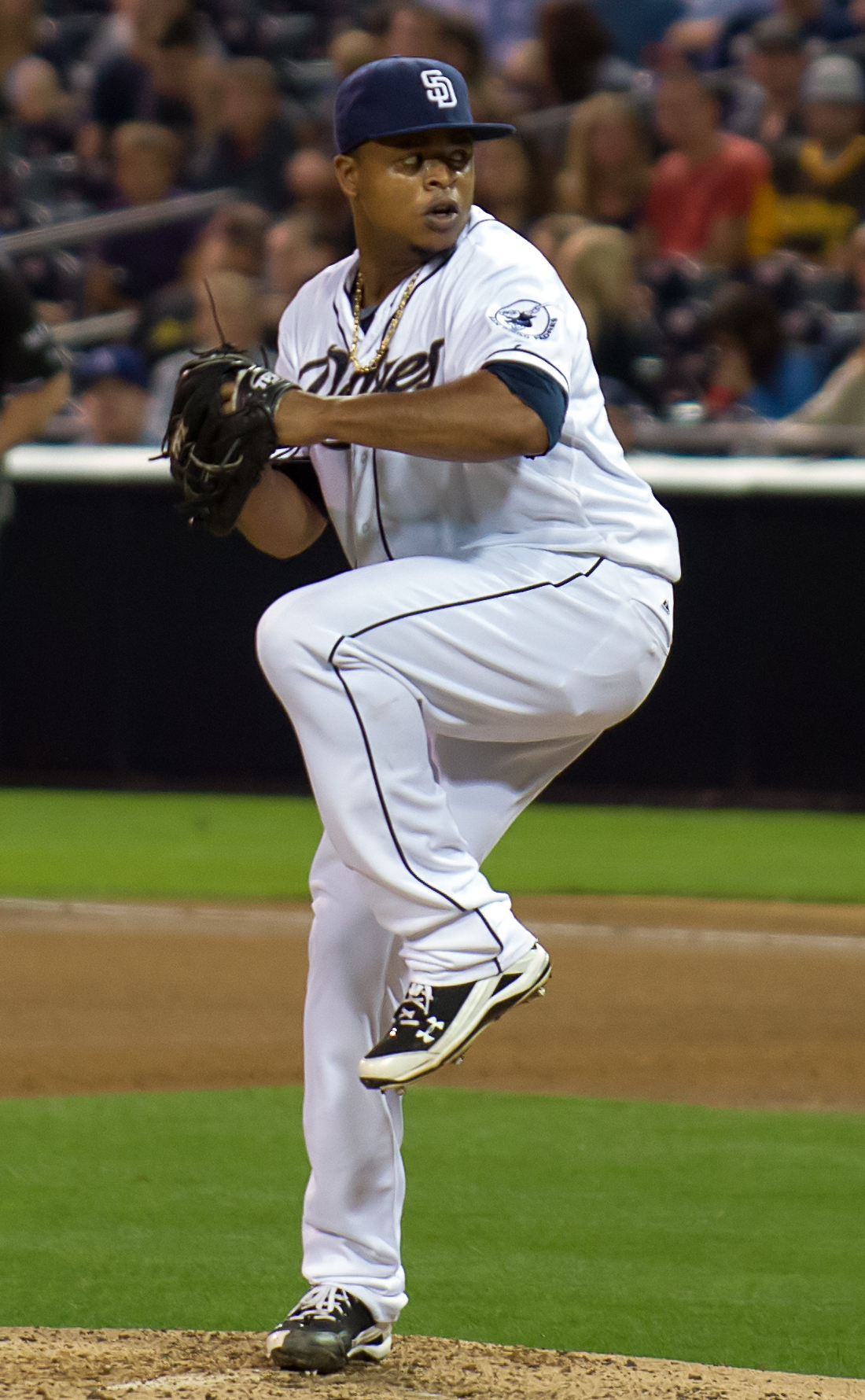
Vólquez pitching for the San Diego Padres in 2012

On December 17, 2011, Vólquez, Yonder Alonso, Yasmani Grandal, and Brad Boxberger were traded by the Reds to the San Diego Padres for Mat Latos. Vólquez was the Padres' Opening Day starter for the 2012 season, losing 5–3 to the Los Angeles Dodgers. Vólquez, along with Clayton Richard, was a mainstay of the Padres 2012 rotation, making 32 starts and pitching 182 2/3 innings. His highlight game of the season came on July 19 when he pitched a one-hit shutout at home against the Houston Astros. Vólquez finished the season 11–11 with a 4.14 ERA. He collected 174 strikeouts, but issued a league-leading 105 walks.

Vólquez was again the Padres' Opening Day starter in 2013. On June 2, Vólquez hit his first career home run, a 3-run homer off Toronto Blue Jays pitcher Ramón Ortiz. Despite his home run, the Padres lost the game 7–4. The Padres designated Vólquez for assignment on August 24, a day after he gave up six runs while only recording two outs in a start against the Chicago Cubs. At the time, Vólquez led the NL with 95 earned runs. He was released three days later. In 27 starts for the Padres in 2013, Vólquez went 9–10 with a 6.01 ERA.

=== Los Angeles Dodgers ===
On August 30, 2013, Vólquez signed with the Los Angeles Dodgers on a Major League contract. Vólquez appeared for the Dodgers that night, pitching one scoreless inning in relief against his former team, the Padres. He joined the Dodgers rotation soon after and made 5 starts in September for them. He was 0–2 with a 4.18 ERA for the Dodgers in 2013.

=== Pittsburgh Pirates ===
On December 13, 2013, Vólquez signed a one-year deal worth $5 million with the Pittsburgh Pirates. Volquez experienced a career rebirth with the Pirates, going 13–7 with a 3.04 ERA and 140 strikeouts in 32 games (31 starts), pitching 192 2/3 innings. On October 1, 2014. Vólquez started the 2014 National League Wild Card Game for the Pirates against the San Francisco Giants. Vólquez would not come through however, giving up 5 ERs, including a grand slam to Giants shortstop Brandon Crawford, in 5 innings pitched. The Pirates would go on to lose 8–0, eliminating them from the playoffs in the process. The Wild Card Game would prove to be Volquez's last game as a Pirate, as he became a free agent after the 2014 season.

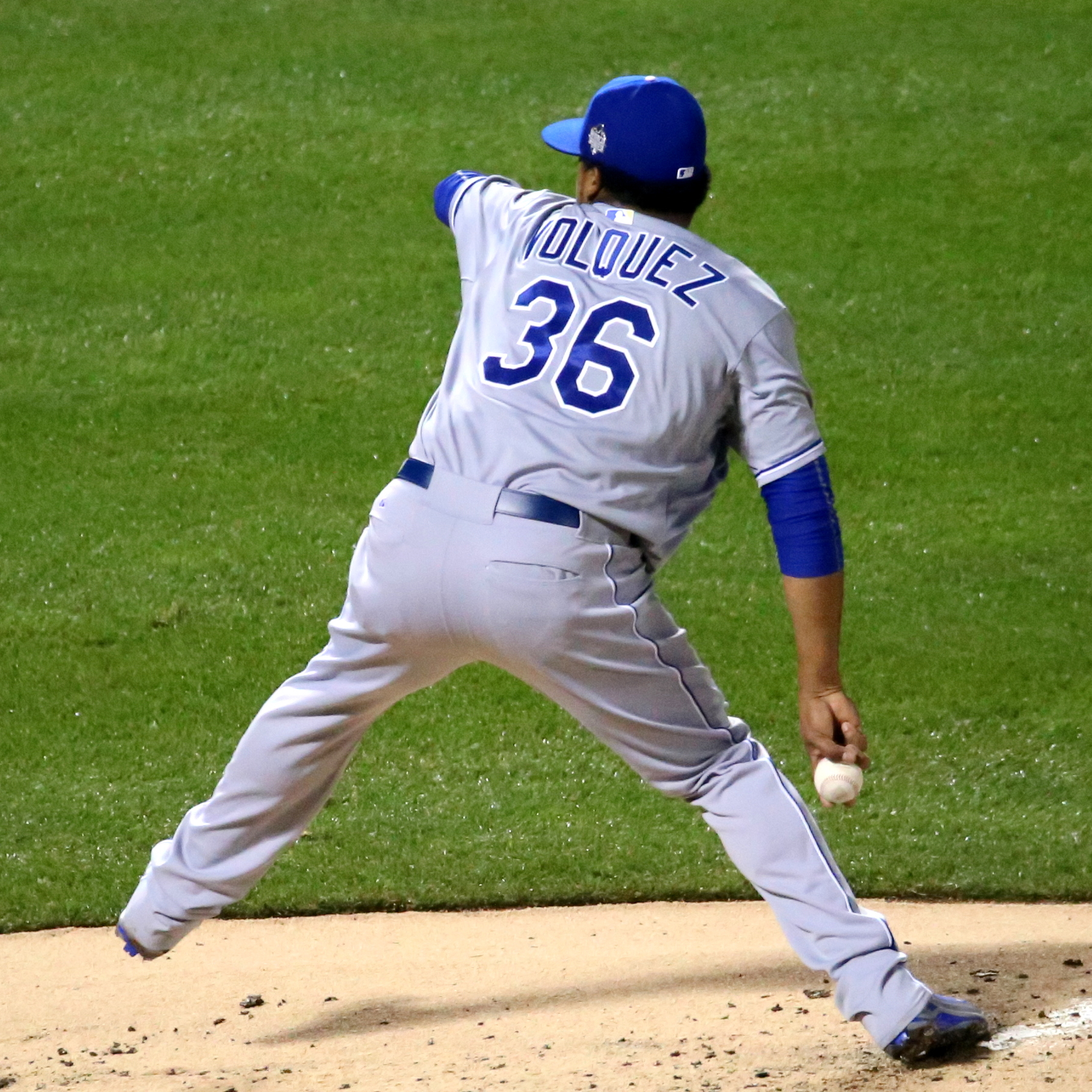
Vólquez pitching in 2015 World Series

=== Kansas City Royals ===
On December 29, 2014, the Kansas City Royals announced that they had signed Vólquez to a 2-year, $20 million contract. During a game against the Chicago White Sox on April 23, 2015, Vólquez was ejected for his role in the brawl. Two days later, he was suspended five games. He had the option to appeal the suspension but dropped it on April 27, 2015, which made the suspension apply effective immediately. After finishing the regular season 13–9 with a 3.55 ERA in a career-high 200 1/3 innings, Vólquez started Game 1 of the 2015 World Series, giving up three runs in six innings and receiving a no-decision. The Royals would go on to win, 5–4, in 14 innings. Vólquez pitched the game unaware that his father had died (his wife found out before the game and instructed the coaching staff and the press not to let Vólquez know of that until he was done pitching for the night). Vólquez got the nod to start in Game 5 against Matt Harvey, where he gave up 2 earned runs on only 2 hits in 6 innings with a no-decision. The Royals again forced the game into extra innings before defeating the Mets to win the World Series.

On June 24, 2016, Vólquez experienced one of the worst starts of his career as he allowed 12 runs (11 earned) in the first inning. He only lasted one inning as the Royals lost to the Houston Astros 13–4. On November 4, Vólquez declined his option to remain with the Royals and became a free agent.

=== Miami Marlins ===
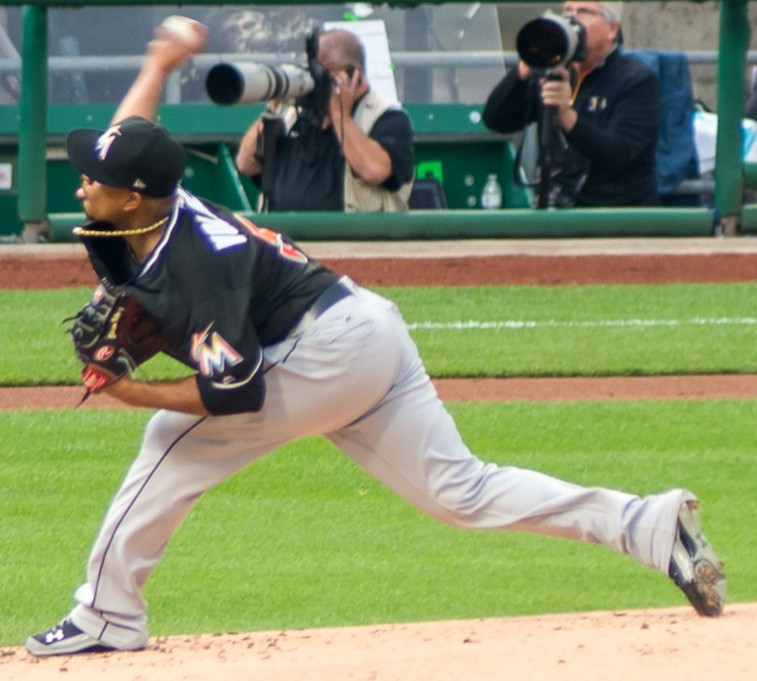
Vólquez pitching for the Miami Marlins in 2017

On November 28, 2016, Vólquez agreed to a two-year, $22 million contract with the Miami Marlins. The contract became official on December 1. On March 24, 2017, Vólquez was named the Marlins opening day starter for the 2017 season. He was credited with 7 losses and no wins in his first nine starts. He recorded his first win on May 29 in a 4–1 decision against the Philadelphia Phillies. On June 3, Volquez threw a no-hitter against the Arizona Diamondbacks at Miami's Marlins Park in a 3–0 decision. Volquez threw 98 pitches, struck out 10 and walked two batters (who were both retired on double plays), facing the minimum 27 batters. It was the sixth no hitter in Marlins history and the first since Henderson Alvarez's in 2013. It was also the first no-hitter ever to have a hit overturned by replay review. Before the game, he dedicated the game to his fallen Royals friend, Yordano Ventura, as well as fallen Marlins ace Jose Fernandez. The game took place on what would have been Ventura's 26th birthday. He was later named the NL Player of the Week for the first time in his career, pitching 15 innings allowing one run (an 0.60 ERA) and four hits with 14 strikeouts in two starts. On August 4, 2017, Volquez underwent Tommy John surgery, putting him down for the remainder of the season. Vólquez was released by the Marlins on December 13, 2017.

=== Texas Rangers (second stint) ===
On February 16, 2018, Vólquez signed a two-year minor league contract with the Texas Rangers, with the 2018 season spent recovering from Tommy John surgery.

On November 20, 2018, Vólquez was added to the Texas Rangers 40-man major league roster for the 2019 season. On April 5, 2019, Vólquez was placed on the 10-day injured list with a sprained right elbow.

Texas re-signed Vólquez to a minor league contract with an invitation to spring training on December 16, 2019.

In 2020, he made the Rangers Opening Day roster out of the bullpen. In 7 games, he was 2–1 with a 6.35 ERA in 5 2/3 innings.

== International career ==
Vólquez pitched in the 2009 World Baseball Classic. He took the loss in the opening game for the Dominican Republic against the Netherlands, giving up three runs (unearned), two hits, two walks and three strikeouts in three innings pitched.

Vólquez again pitched for the eventual champion Dominican Republic in the 2013 World Baseball Classic, starting the first game in each of the three tournament rounds. He allowed 5 runs in 10 1/3 innings and picked up the win in the semifinal game against the Netherlands.

== Scouting report ==
Vólquez threw 4 pitches: a low to mid-90s fastball, a two-seam fastball that also clocked in the low to mid-90s, a mid-80s changeup and a high-70s curveball. Throughout his career, Vólquez struggled with command of his pitches.

== Personal life ==
Vólquez makes a home in the Dominican Republic, where he spends four months during the off-season. Vólquez's father died on October 27, 2015, the same day he started Game 1 of the World Series. His wife requested that he not be informed mid-game of his father's death, so he had no knowledge of his death during his start. After pitching six innings, Vólquez exited the game and learned about the death in the clubhouse surrounded by his family.

Vólquez's brother, Brandy, was stabbed to death in the Dominican Republic on January 17, 2017.

== Name issues ==
When he was signed by the Rangers in 2001 at age 17, he went by the name Julio Reyes, but his name was revealed to be Edison Vólquez after an immigration crackdown in 2003. In 2007, he asked the Rangers to add an "n" to his name after checking his birth certificate to find he was born Edinson.

== Notes ==
Achievements
Preceded by Jake Arrieta	No-hitter pitcher June 3, 2017	Succeeded by Sean Manaea
