= Eichelberger =

Eichelberger (German: from the acorn mountain) is the surname of:

- Alyce Eichelberger or Alyce Cleese (born 1944), American psychotherapist and author
- Charles B. Eichelberger (1934–2021), US Army general
- Dave Eichelberger (born 1943), American golfer
- Ethyl Eichelberger (1945–1990), American actor
- John Eichelberger (born 1958), American politician
- Juan Eichelberger (born 1953), American baseball player
- Robert L. Eichelberger (1886–1961), US Army general of World War II
