= Jhoulys Chacín =

American-Venezuelan baseball player (born 1988)

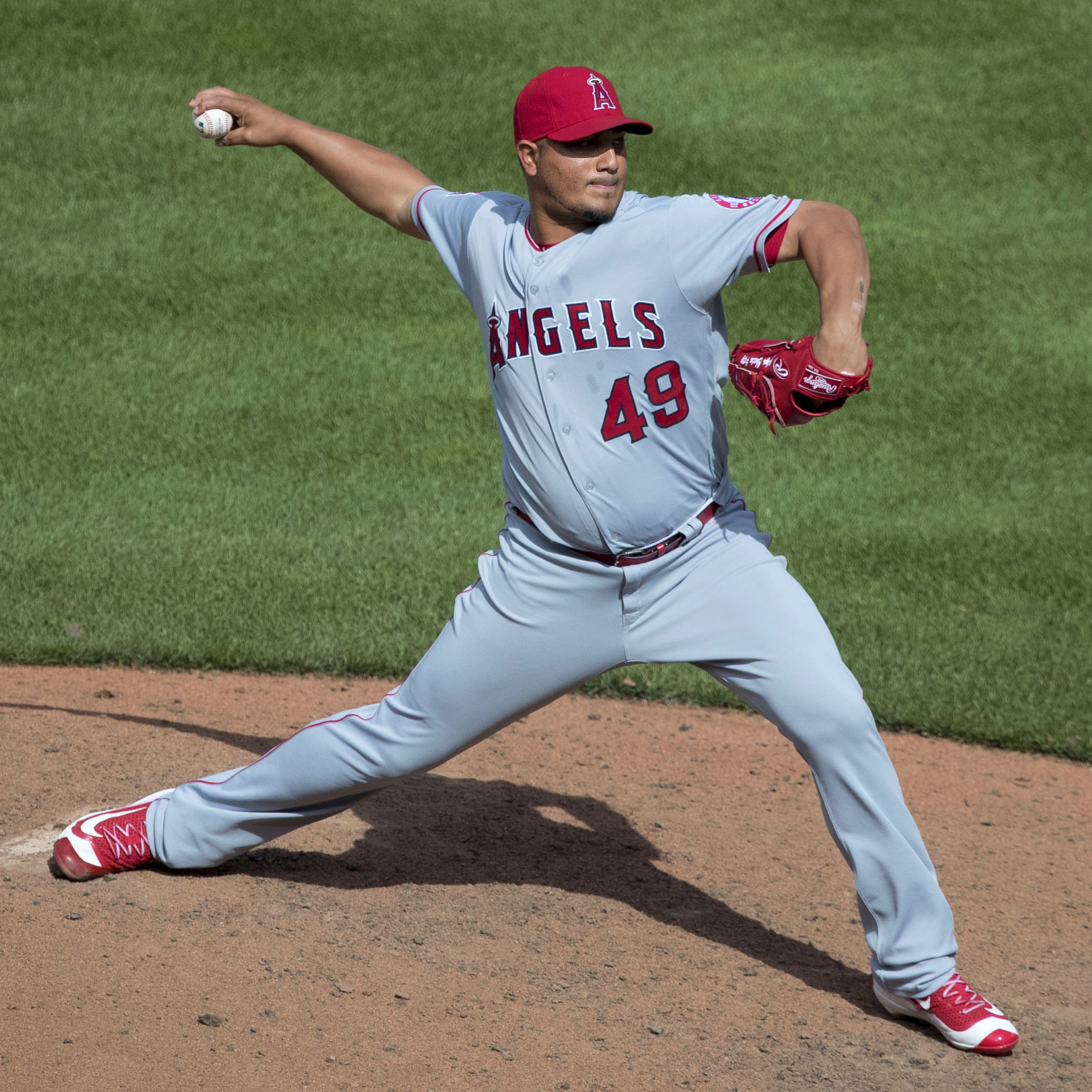
- Chacín with the Los Angeles Angels in 2016
- Pitcher
- Born: January 7, 1988 (age 38); Maracaibo, Venezuela
- Batted: Right Threw: Right

MLB debut
- July 25, 2009, for the Colorado Rockies

Last MLB appearance
- September 11, 2022, for the Colorado Rockies

MLB statistics
- Win–loss record: 85–91
- Earned run average: 4.18
- Strikeouts: 1,151
- Stats at Baseball Reference

Teams
- Colorado Rockies (2009–2014); Arizona Diamondbacks (2015); Atlanta Braves (2016); Los Angeles Angels (2016); San Diego Padres (2017); Milwaukee Brewers (2018–2019); Boston Red Sox (2019); Atlanta Braves (2020); Colorado Rockies (2021–2022)

Jhoulys Jose Chacín Molina (Jo-LEASE Sha-SEEN; born January 7, 1988) is a Venezuelan-American former professional baseball pitcher. He played in Major League Baseball (MLB) for the Colorado Rockies, Arizona Diamondbacks, Los Angeles Angels, San Diego Padres, Milwaukee Brewers, Boston Red Sox, and Atlanta Braves. Listed at 6 feet 3 inches (1.91 m) and 215 pounds (98 kg), he throws and bats right-handed.

== Professional career ==
=== Colorado Rockies ===
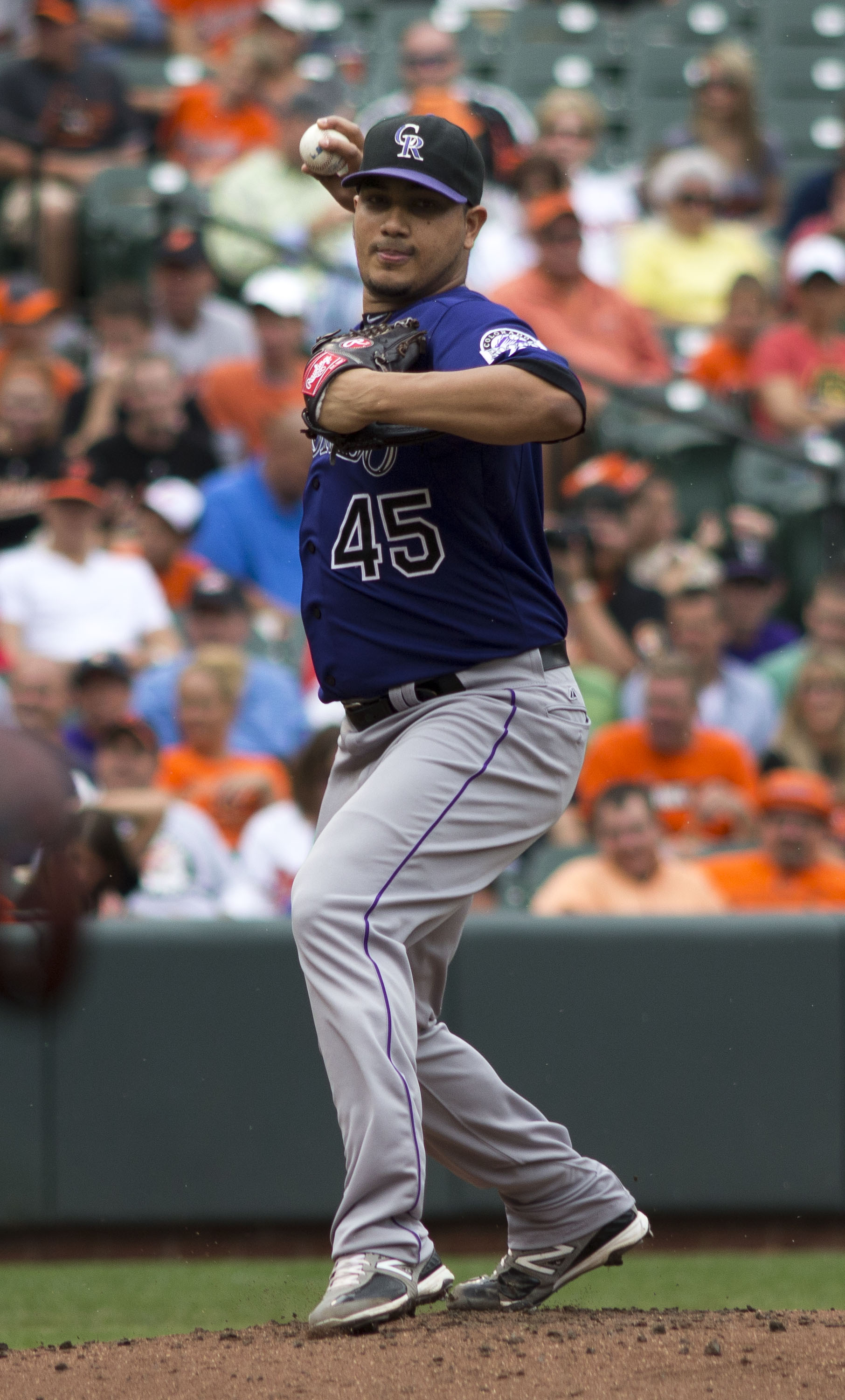
Chacín with the Colorado Rockies in 2013

Chacín signed with the Colorado Rockies as an international free agent in 2004 and was considered to be one of their top prospects prior to 2009 and 2010. He was called up directly to the majors from the Double-A Tulsa Drillers on July 24, 2009. In 2010, in his first full season in MLB with the Rockies, Chacín had 9 wins, a 3.28 ERA, and led all National League rookies with 138 strikeouts.

Chacín started the 2011 season as one of the best young pitchers in baseball, but after the second half of the season, he became inconsistent with his mechanics. He finished with a record of 11–14 with a 3.62 ERA in 31 starts. In 194 innings pitched, he struck out 150 batters. However, he led the National League in walks with 87. He threw his first career shutout in his first career complete game on April 15. In 2012, Chacín was limited to just 14 starts due to a pectoral injury.

In 2013, Chacín rebounded to give the Rockies a much needed lift in the rotation. He finished 14–10 with 3.47 ERA in 197 1/3 innings pitched. He allowed only 11 home runs, 6 of which were allowed in Coors Field, while also hitting his first major league home run against Randall Delgado. Chacín began the 2014 season on the disabled list with shoulder inflammation. He faced injury and inconsistency, managing to start just 11 games before being shut down for the season due to injury. His record finished at 1–7 and a career-worst 5.40 ERA.

On March 22, 2015, the Rockies released Chacín.

=== Cleveland Indians ===
On April 14, 2015, Chacín signed a minor league contract with the Cleveland Indians. He was granted his release on June 18 after exercising an opt-out clause. He had a 3.21 ERA in 7 starts for the Triple-A Columbus Clippers.

=== Arizona Diamondbacks ===
On June 20, 2015, Chacín signed a minor league contract with the Arizona Diamondbacks. On August 24, the Diamondbacks add Chacín to their active roster. In 5 games (4 starts) for Arizona, he had a 2–1 record and 3.38 ERA with 21 strikeouts across 26 2/3 innings pitched. On November 6, Chacín was removed from the 40-man roster and sent outright to minors. However, he rejected the assignment in favor of free agency.

=== Atlanta Braves ===
On December 14, 2015, Chacín signed a minor league contract with the Atlanta Braves. He was also given a non-roster invitation to spring training. Chacín began the 2016 season with the Gwinnett Braves of the Triple-A International League and soon was promoted to the majors on April 12. He started 5 games for Atlanta, going 1–2 with a 5.40 ERA.

=== Los Angeles Angels ===
On May 11, 2016, the Braves traded Chacín to the Los Angeles Angels for minor league pitcher Adam McCreery. Chacín began his tenure with the Angels in the rotation but was then pushed to the bullpen. He served as a swingman for the Angels, appearing in 29 games total, 17 of them starts. He finished 5–6 with 1 complete game and a 4.68 ERA for the Angels.

=== San Diego Padres ===
On December 20, 2016, Chacín signed a one-year contract with the San Diego Padres. At the end of spring training, he was tabbed to be the Padres opening day starter. Chacín finished the year 13–10 with a 3.89 ERA and 1.27 WHIP in 180 1/3 innings and 153 strikeouts. He established career highs in starts, strikeouts, and strikeout per nine innings (7.64). He shared the major league lead in hit batsmen, with 14.

=== Milwaukee Brewers ===
On December 21, 2017, Chacín signed a two-year, $15.5 million contract with the Milwaukee Brewers. For the 2018 season, he went 15–8 with a 3.50 ERA and 156 strikeouts in 192 2/3 innings, setting new career highs in wins, strikeouts, and starts (35).

Chacín was the 2019 opening day starter on March 28, against the St. Louis Cardinals. He got the win while also hitting a home run off of Miles Mikolas. Chacín was placed on the disabled list on July 25, with a right oblique strain, expected to sideline him for two to four weeks. At that point in the season, he had a 3–10 record with 5.79 ERA and 80 strikeouts in 88 2/3 innings. On August 24, Chacín was designated for assignment; he was released two days later.

=== Boston Red Sox ===
On August 31, 2019, Chacín signed a minor league contract with the Boston Red Sox. The next day, Boston added him to their active MLB roster. He made his Red Sox debut on September 6, pitching two innings against the New York Yankees, retiring all six batters he faced, striking out four. He then moved to the rotation, starting five games. With the 2019 Red Sox, Chacín had an 0–2 record with 7.36 ERA and 21 strikeouts in 14 2/3 innings. He became a free agent on October 31.

=== Atlanta Braves (second stint) ===
On February 1, 2020, Chacín signed a minor league contract with the Minnesota Twins. On July 19, Chacín was granted his release by the Twins without having appeared for the organization as a result of the cancellation of the minor league season because of the COVID-19 pandemic.

On July 21, Chacín signed a one-year major league contract with the Atlanta Braves. In two games for Atlanta, he had a 7.20 ERA with 3 strikeouts over 5 innings. On August 1, the Braves designated Chacín for assignment.

=== Colorado Rockies (second stint) ===
On January 6, 2021, the same day he became an American citizen, Chacín signed a minor league contract with the New York Yankees organization. Prior to the start of the season on March 29, the Yankees released him.

On April 1, Chacín signed a major league contract with the Colorado Rockies. In June, he reached 10 years of major league service time. He was on the COVID-19 injured list for 12 days in July. He pitched exclusively as a reliever for the first time in his career, posting a 3–2 record and 4.34 ERA with 47 strikeouts in 46 games, starting once.

On November 13, Chacín re-signed with the Rockies for one year and $1.25 million. After posting a 7.61 ERA in 35 games in 2022, The Rockies released Chacín on September 15.

=== 2024: suspension and Saraperos de Saltillo ===
While playing for the Leones del Caracas in the Venezuelan winter league, Chacín was suspended in February 2024 after testing positive for a performance-enhancing substance. He said he tested positive due to a weight-loss medication.

On February 25, Chacín signed with the Saraperos de Saltillo of the Mexican League. In 16 games (15 starts) for Saltillo, he had a 4–5 record and 6.40 ERA with 58 strikeouts across 77 1/3 innings pitched. The Saraperos released him on July 26.

== International career ==
Chacín pitched for the Venezuela national team in the 2013, 2017, and 2023 World Baseball Classic tournaments. He pitched once in 2013, allowing 4 runs in 3 1/3 innings. In 2017, he started once and relieved once, allowing 6 runs in 8 innings. In 2017, he gave up an unearned run in two innings in one appearance.

== Personal life ==
On December 1, 2010, Chacín's girlfriend gave birth to their daughter. They later married and had a second child.

On January 6, 2021, Chacín became a naturalized American citizen.

== See also ==
- List of Major League Baseball players from Venezuela
