= Pascual Pérez (baseball) =

Dominican baseball player (1957–2012)

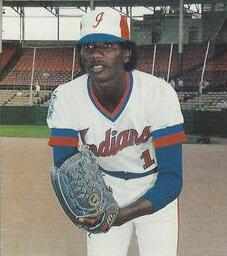
- Pérez with the Indianapolis Indians c. 1987
- Pitcher
- Born: May 17, 1957; San Cristóbal, Dominican Republic
- Died: November 1, 2012 (aged 55); San Gregorio de Nigua, Dominican Republic
- Batted: Right Threw: Right

MLB debut
- May 7, 1980, for the Pittsburgh Pirates

Last MLB appearance
- October 2, 1991, for the New York Yankees

MLB statistics
- Win–loss record: 67–68
- Earned run average: 3.44
- Strikeouts: 822
- Stats at Baseball Reference

Teams
- Pittsburgh Pirates (1980–1981); Atlanta Braves (1982–1985); Montreal Expos (1987–1989); New York Yankees (1990–1991)

Career highlights and awards
- All-Star (1983)

Pascual Gross Pérez (May 17, 1957 – November 1, 2012) was a Dominican professional baseball player who pitched in Major League Baseball (MLB) for the Pittsburgh Pirates, Atlanta Braves, Montreal Expos, and New York Yankees from 1980 to 1991. He was an MLB All-Star in 1983 with the Braves.

== Career ==
Pérez was signed by scout Neftalí Cruz for the Pittsburgh Pirates organization in 1976. He reached the major league club in 1980. Traded to the Braves on June 30, 1982, he enjoyed his winningest seasons while with that organization, going 15–8 and 14–8 in 1983 and 1984 respectively. His most successful seasons were spent with the Montreal Expos, where he went 28–21 with a 2.80 ERA between 1987 and 1989.

Slender at 6 feet 2 inches (1.88 m), 162 pounds (73 kg), he received extensive press coverage for both on-field and off-field controversies. He was arrested for cocaine possession in his native Dominican Republic in January 1984 and spent three months in prison although his ultimate sentence was only a fine of $1,000. He did not rejoin the Braves until May 1984. He often drew the ire of his opponents, using an imaginary finger gun to shoot opponents and would pound the baseball into the ground. While it is customary for pitchers to walk back to the bench after completing an inning, he would run full speed to the dugout (gold chains and long, curly locks bouncing) after an inning-ending strikeout. He eventually added the "Pascual pitch" (his version of the "eephus") to his repertoire. He was also involved in more than one beanball incident, most notably an August 12, 1984 brawl with the San Diego Padres where he hit the Padres' Alan Wiggins with his first pitch leading off the game, inciting each San Diego pitcher in the game to throw at him each time he came to bat. He had just received his driver's license and earned the nicknames "Perimeter Pascual" and "Wrong-Way Perez" after missing a start on August 19, 1982, while circling Atlanta's Interstate 285 (a beltway) three times looking for Atlanta–Fulton County Stadium, he ran out of gas and arrived at the ballpark 10 minutes late.

Released by the Braves on April 1, 1986, he missed the entire 1986 season. After signing a minor league contract with the Expos in 1987, he joined them in August and finished the 1987 season 7–0 with an outstanding 2.30 ERA. His last winning season came the following year when he went 12–8 and posted a 2.44 ERA with the Expos.

Pérez threw a five-inning rain-shortened no-hitter against the Phillies on September 24, 1988. It was the first no-hitter in Veterans Stadium history. Pérez allowed one walk, and another Phillies baserunner reached on an error. Umpire Harry Wendelstedt waved off the game after a 90-minute rain delay after the game was stopped by rain with one out in the top of the sixth. However, due to a statistical rule change in 1991, no-hitters must last at least nine innings to count. As a result of the retroactive application of the new rule, this game and thirty-five others are no longer considered no-hitters.

Pérez was granted free agency in November 1989 and signed a three-year contract with the Yankees. Through 1990 and 1991, he started only 17 games for the Yankees and compiled records of 1–2 and 2–4 respectively. Prior to the 1992 season, he was suspended by Major League Baseball for one year for violating the league's drug policy, a suspension that ended his career. His career record was 67–68.

Pérez first made his trademark peek through the legs to check the runner on first in 1979 in the Dominican League.

== Personal life ==
Two of his brothers, Mélido and Carlos, were also major league pitchers, as was a cousin, Yorkis.

He also was married for 16 years to Maritza Madera Gross and had two daughters, Mariel Gross and Roxanna Gross.

== Death ==
Pérez was found dead in his bedroom in San Gregorio de Nigua, Dominican Republic, on November 1, 2012, after being hit on the head repeatedly with a hammer in an apparent robbery. He was also stabbed in the neck.
