= Alan Wiggins =

American baseball player (1958–1991)

- Wiggins with the San Diego Padres in 1983
- Second baseman / Outfielder
- Born: February 17, 1958; Los Angeles, California, U.S.
- Died: January 6, 1991 (aged 32); Los Angeles, California, U.S.
- Batted: Switch Threw: Right

MLB debut
- September 4, 1981, for the San Diego Padres

Last MLB appearance
- August 28, 1987, for the Baltimore Orioles

MLB statistics
- Batting average: .259
- Home runs: 5
- Runs batted in: 118
- Stolen bases: 242
- Stats at Baseball Reference

Teams
- San Diego Padres (1981–1985); Baltimore Orioles (1985–1987)

Alan Anthony Wiggins (February 17, 1958 – January 6, 1991) was an American professional baseball player. He was a second baseman and outfielder in Major League Baseball (MLB) for the San Diego Padres and Baltimore Orioles between 1981 and 1987. A speedy leadoff hitter, Wiggins had his best season with the pennant-winning Padres in 1984. He batted one slot ahead of Tony Gwynn in the lineup that year, and the pair's offensive production helped the Padres win the National League Championship Series (NLCS) and advance to the World Series.

Wiggins grew up in California and attended Pasadena City College before being drafted by the California Angels in 1977. He played in the minor league systems of the Angels and the Los Angeles Dodgers, setting a professional baseball single-season record with 120 stolen bases in 1980. He made his major league debut with the San Diego Padres in 1981, and he became a regular player within two years. In 1983 he set the Padres' single-season stolen base record, a mark that he extended the following season. His 1984 stolen base total (70) is still a team record as of the start of the 2026 season.

During his major league career, Wiggins struggled with drug addiction, which resulted in several arrests and suspensions from baseball. His drug problems prompted a 1985 trade from San Diego to Baltimore, where Wiggins spent three seasons. After leaving baseball, he was diagnosed with AIDS, and he was the first MLB player known to die of the disease. Long after his death, two of his children, Candice and Alan Jr., became professional basketball players.

== Early life ==
Wiggins was born in Los Angeles, California, and his mother, Karla Wiggins, raised him as a single mother. As a child, he played baseball with his friends at a park across from the Rose Bowl, and he was a fan of the Los Angeles Dodgers and their base-stealing shortstop, Maury Wills. Wiggins graduated from John Muir High School in Pasadena, California, (Note: At least two websites, Baseball-Reference.com and TheBaseballCube.com, list his high school as Hialeah High School in Hialeah, Florida.) which was also the alma mater of Dodgers star Jackie Robinson. Gib Bodet, a scout for the Montreal Expos, noticed Wiggins in high school. Wiggins was 6 feet 2 inches (188 cm) tall, which was taller than a typical infielder. He was only an average hitter and fielder, but his speed stood out to Bodet.

The California Angels selected Wiggins as the eighth overall pick of the January 1977 MLB amateur draft. In 1977 Wiggins played junior college baseball at Pasadena City College, where he was a teammate of future major leaguers Matt Young and Rod Booker. Bodet, who had moved to the Angels scouting staff just before the draft, joined other Angels staff members and worked out with Wiggins after the team selected him. Angels coach Bob Clear told Wiggins that his excellent speed would help him to a high batting average even if his hitting skills were not that strong: "If you can hit .200, you can run the other eighty points. And if you can hit .280, you can lead off for anybody." Wiggins signed with the Angels in May for $2,500 after what Bodet described as "a tough negotiation". According to Bodet, Wiggins's mother "did not trust easily".

== Baseball career ==
=== Early career ===
Wiggins played minor league baseball in 1977 for the Angels rookie-league affiliate in Idaho Falls, where he hit .271 and had 25 stolen bases in 63 games. In 1978, with the Class A Quad Cities Angels, Wiggins stole 26 bases in 49 games, but his batting average fell to .201. Following a mid-season fight with one of his coaches, he was released by the Angels organization in June 1978. (Note: A Los Angeles Times article suggests that the fight and Wiggins's release occurred in 1977, but Baseball-Reference.com shows that Wiggins played with the Angels organization for part of 1978 and that he was released by the organization on June 10, 1978.) Wiggins feared that his career was near its end, but he reached out to Los Angeles Dodgers scout Gail Henley. After a workout in front of the Dodgers and manager Tommy Lasorda, Wiggins signed with the team before the 1979 season, receiving an invitation to spring training and then being assigned to the team's Class A affiliate, the Clinton Dodgers.

In 95 games for Clinton, Wiggins hit .257, stole 43 bases, and converted to a shortstop after spending the previous two seasons as a second baseman. He also appeared in the outfield and at all three of the other infield positions for Clinton. Playing with the Class A Lodi Dodgers of the California League in 1980, Wiggins batted .288 and scored 108 runs while stealing 120 bases in just 135 games. He established a professional baseball single-season steals record, (Note: Jeff Stone broke the record with 123 steals in 1981.) surpassing the previous minor league mark of 116 set by Allan Lewis in 1966, as well as Lou Brock's major league record of 118 in 1974.

After the 1980 season, Wiggins's fourth year in the minor leagues, he was eligible to be selected by other teams in that year's Rule 5 draft. The Rule 5 draft is a procedure that stops teams from hoarding young players in the minor leagues when those players might be able to make it to the major leagues with other organizations. A team can protect a player from the Rule 5 draft by adding him to its major league roster. The Dodgers decided not to protect Wiggins, and since he had once caught the eye of San Diego Padres general manager Jack McKeon, the Padres selected him in the draft. Padres officials later said that they knew Wiggins had been arrested for possession of marijuana while with the Dodgers. "It was known in our organization that he had a problem in the Dodger organization. They didn't want a part of it," Padres manager Dick Williams said.

=== San Diego Padres ===
After having spent most of his minor league career as an infielder, he was used almost exclusively as an outfielder with the Hawaii Islanders of the Pacific Coast League in 1981. He batted .302 with 73 steals, and received a September call-up to the major leagues as an outfielder. In his first stint with the Padres, he got five hits in 14 at bats. Wiggins began the following season with the Islanders, but he was called up again by the Padres in early May to replace injured outfielder Gene Richards. Wiggins was leading San Diego with 29 stolen bases in 59 games when he was arrested for possession of cocaine in July. He was issued a 30-day suspension from baseball, and spent a month in a substance abuse treatment facility. The Padres, who were one of the first sports teams to offer an employee assistance program to players, paid for all of his treatment, and he returned to the team in September. By 1983 Wiggins had become a regular in the Padres lineup, batting in the leadoff spot and playing in the outfield for most of the season. He was exceptional on defense in left field, hit .276 and stole 66 bases. He was moved to first base for the last 45 games of the year after Steve Garvey suffered a broken thumb. Wiggins's stolen base total broke the single-season team record of 61 set by Richards in 1980. Wiggins was named the team's most valuable player that season.

Wiggins was moved to second base in 1984, making room for rookie Carmelo Martínez in the outfield. Until that season, Martínez had been a first baseman, but the Padres already had a strong player there with Garvey, and they wanted to get Martínez into the lineup to improve their outfield's home run production. Wiggins retained the leadoff spot in the lineup, hitting ahead of Tony Gwynn. On May 17, Wiggins became the fifth 20th-century MLB player to steal five bases in one game, tying a National League (NL) record. During an August game, Wiggins unwittingly became a party to a series of fights between the Padres and Atlanta Braves when he was hit with the game's first pitch by Braves pitcher Pascual Pérez. The teams retaliated against each other throughout the game with brushback pitches and beanballs, and the resulting brawls led to thirteen ejections and even the arrests of five fans who became involved in the fighting.

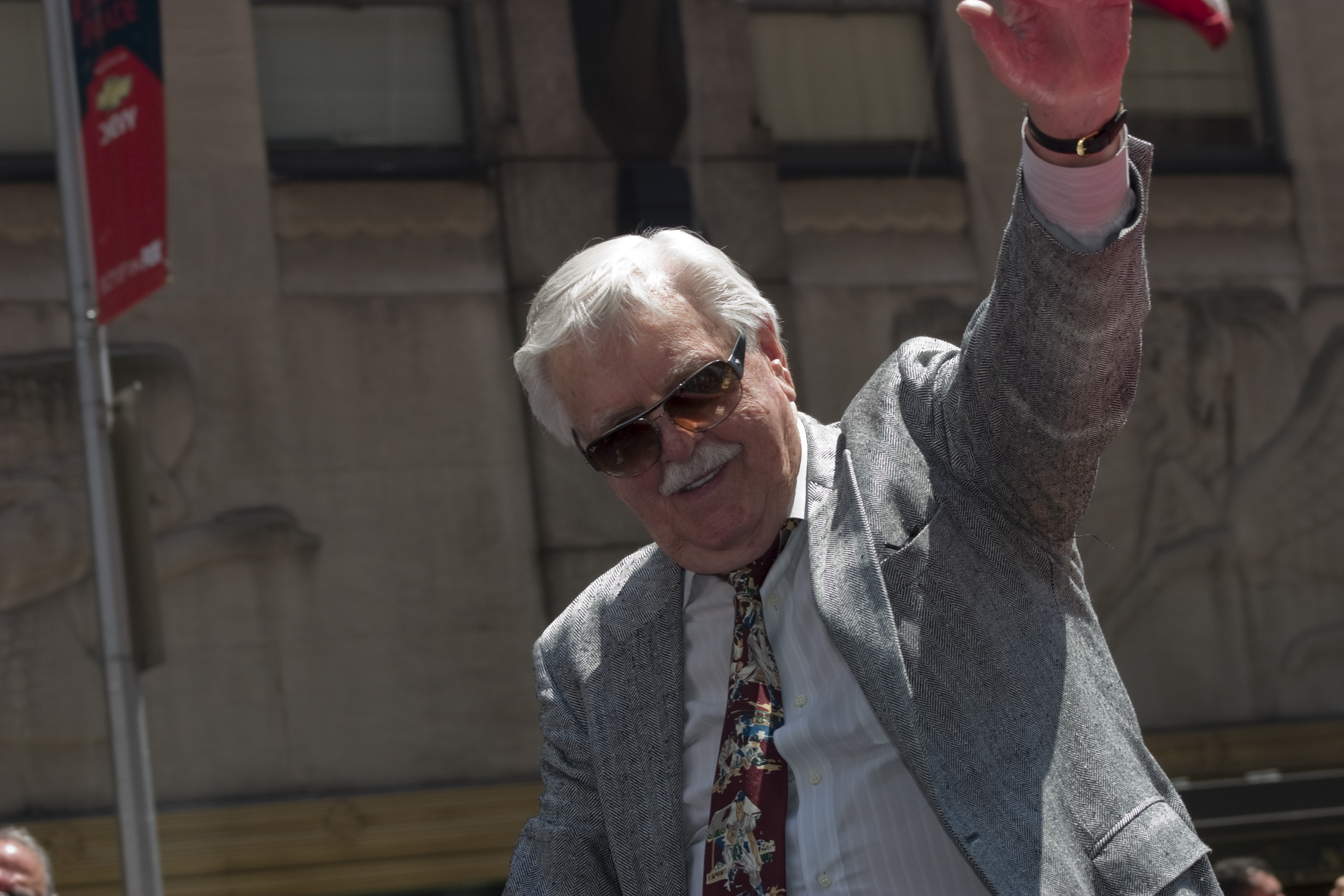
Manager Dick Williams said that Wiggins was the league's most valuable player in 1984.

On the season, Wiggins scored 106 runs, stole 70 bases and led the league with 391 putouts. His stolen bases total stands as a Padres single-season record as of the end of the 2023 season. Benefitting from the higher number of fastballs opposing pitchers threw in response to Wiggins's speed, Gwynn batted above .400 when his speedy teammate was on base, and hit .351 overall for the first of his eight career batting titles. The duo was one of the biggest reasons behind San Diego's success. The team could score quickly with Wiggins getting on first, stealing second, and scoring on a hit by Gwynn. Wiggins batted .316 in the 1984 NLCS against the Chicago Cubs, going two-for-three with two runs scored in the fifth and deciding game. In the 1984 World Series against the Detroit Tigers, which the Padres lost in five games, Wiggins batted .364 and scored twice. His eight hits were the most of any Padres player in the series. According to manager Dick Williams, Wiggins was "absolutely the most valuable player in the National League in 1984". "Alan Wiggins' role in bringing San Diego the 1984 National League championship wasn't put into proper perspective until the Padres tried to defend their title without him," sportswriter Phil Collier later wrote.

Before the 1985 season, the Padres signed Wiggins to a four-year contract extension worth nearly $3 million. His agent described him as one of the highest-paid NL second basemen. Wiggins missed the last two weeks of spring training after injuring his knee during a double-play attempt on defense when a baserunner slid into him. He was unavailable for the start of the season, but returned to the lineup after being out for five games. Wiggins was batting .054 and was without a stolen base two weeks into the season when he was suspended by the Padres following a relapse into cocaine dependency. After Wiggins completed a drug rehabilitation program, the Padres did not want to reactivate him, but baseball's joint review board cleared him to return to play. In June, Donald Fehr of the Major League Baseball Players Association (MLBPA) announced that he intended to file a grievance against the Padres if they did not promptly activate Wiggins. The Padres sought to trade Wiggins and the Baltimore Orioles showed interest, but as the trade deadline approached, the Orioles were reportedly only offering two minor league players in exchange for him.

On June 27, 1985, Wiggins was traded to the Orioles for pitchers Roy Lee Jackson and Richard Caldwell. Padres owner Joan Kroc said that the team had warned Wiggins that he would not remain with the team if he had further problems with drugs. She stated that it would have been self-serving to keep Wiggins after his relapse when he could instead pursue a fresh start with another team. Nonetheless, Gwynn felt that Wiggins had been shortchanged by the Padres.

=== Baltimore Orioles ===
Wiggins spent a few days in the minor leagues before being called up to Baltimore. In his first game with the Orioles, he started at second base and was the team's leadoff hitter, reaching base three times, driving in a run and scoring a run. After the game, Wiggins commented that he felt welcome on the team and did not feel like he was starting out with anything to prove. In 76 games for Baltimore that year, he hit .285, scored 43 runs and finished eighth in the American League with 30 stolen bases. Baltimore fans felt that Wiggins was lazy, as he often stopped running to first base on ground balls and showed a lack of effort on defense. He spent much of his time alone and did not talk to his teammates for much of the season.

Wiggins later said that he had been depressed because he missed his wife and children, who were still living in San Diego. His family moved to a suburb of Baltimore before the 1986 season, but Wiggins still struggled to win over Orioles fans and teammates. When the team asked him to field extra ground balls during spring training, he complied but did so sluggishly. Later in the year, he angered Cal Ripken Jr. when he threw a bat in frustration and the bat struck Ripken in the dugout. In June, Wiggins was tagged out with the hidden ball trick, and he made three errors the next day, including two in the same inning. After the two-error inning, Baltimore fans booed as his picture was revealed on the scoreboard during a "Who Am I" feature at the ballpark. Wiggins was frustrated by the fan response because he had relatives at the game that day. Manager Earl Weaver understood why Wiggins was upset over the timing of the scoreboard feature, but he said that Wiggins "had more chances than anyone who ever wore an Orioles' uniform". He batted .251 with 21 stolen bases and 30 runs scored, played only 71 games, and was reassigned to the Triple-A Rochester Red Wings at one point in the season.

The following season, Cal Ripken Sr. replaced Weaver as manager of the Orioles. Baltimore signed Rick Burleson to play second base and Ray Knight to play third base. The moves seemed to leave Wiggins battling for an outfield spot, but after he hit .413 during spring training, Ripken suggested that he might use Wiggins as a utility player. Just before the season started, Wiggins said he was not happy with Ripken's idea of using him in a utility role, feeling that his spring performance should have secured him a starting position. He believed that he could be an asset in the leadoff batting slot.

At the start of the 1987 regular season, Wiggins spent some time as a designated hitter (DH) and shared second base duties with Burleson. Rookie second baseman Billy Ripken joined the club on July 10. Burleson was cut, but general manager Hank Peters said, "We're not bringing [Billy Ripken] up here to sit on the bench." Wiggins was hitting .242 on July 10, and he played mostly DH after the rookie's arrival. In early August, Wiggins received a three-day suspension after he got into an altercation with teammate Jim Dwyer and grabbed the shirt of Ripken Sr.

On September 1, MLB indefinitely suspended Wiggins for a behavior issue, and an anonymous Orioles official told the media that the suspension resulted from a positive drug screen. Wiggins was released from the Orioles on September 29 and the team had to pay him two-thirds of his $800,000 salary for 1988. MLBPA officials announced that they would not issue grievances related to Wiggins's suspension and subsequent release, noting that Wiggins wanted to be released by that point.

== Later years ==
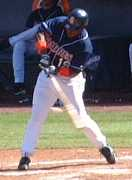
Tony Gwynn, Wiggins's teammate and friend on the Padres

Though Wiggins did not give up hope for a return to baseball, he began to study the real estate market after his suspension from the game. In the late 1980s, Wiggins started to suffer from health difficulties related to AIDS, though the diagnosis was not publicly disclosed while he was alive. He was receiving deferred payments from his baseball career, and he began to make plans for the financial future of his children. He told one of his former teammates that he was getting into computer work.

Gwynn said that he had seen Wiggins in spring 1990 and was struck by his visible weight loss.

In his final months, he sold his home in Poway, California and moved to Pasadena. Though he often stayed with friends, some of his longtime friends felt that he died in seclusion, embarrassed by what had happened with his life.

== Death ==
In November 1990, Wiggins was hospitalized with pneumonia and tuberculosis at Cedars-Sinai Medical Center in Los Angeles. Wiggins stated that he had contracted HIV via intravenous drug use. After lapsing in and out of consciousness for a month, he died at the hospital on January 6, 1991.

Wiggins's family initially attributed his death to lung cancer that had led to respiratory failure. Family members said that he had gotten sick with a cough and that his condition had worsened quickly. Wiggins weighed under 75 pounds (34 kg) at the time of his death. Several days after Wiggins died, a physician disclosed that his health problems were complications of AIDS. He became the first baseball player known to have died from AIDS.

After Wiggins died, longtime Oriole Frank Robinson said, "He was a very bright individual, and you could like the guy. But there was always something there to back you off." Former Padres player Garry Templeton said that he might have been Wiggins's closest friend, but said that he did not know that Wiggins had been ill. Wiggins is buried at Rose Hills Memorial Park in Whittier, California.

== Personal life ==
Wiggins met his wife Angela when they were in junior high school; they both graduated from John Muir High School. The Los Angeles Times reported that Wiggins had experienced marital strife, but that he would not entertain the thought of divorce; he wanted to ensure that his children did not grow up in a single-parent household as he had. Two of Wiggins's three children became professional basketball players. Candice, an All-American at Stanford University, joined the Minnesota Lynx as the third overall pick in the 2008 WNBA draft. She has served as a spokesperson for the Greater Than AIDS campaign. Alan Jr. played at the University of San Francisco and professionally in several countries. His oldest daughter, Cassandra, played college basketball at New York University.

Wiggins and his mother were very close, and her 1983 Alzheimer's disease diagnosis may have contributed to his drug problems. He was devastated that she would not be able to enjoy his success in the major leagues. In the last few years of Wiggins's life, he enjoyed a closer relationship with his father, Albert, and he often took his children on visits to see their grandfather. Wiggins had a very difficult time with his father's death in May 1990.

The Orioles once gave an IQ test, and Wiggins scored higher than everyone except for Weaver. Wiggins's agent, Tony Attanasio, said that Wiggins's intelligence had caused problems in his relationships with teammates. He said that Wiggins had always been reserved and had a difficult time trusting other people. Wiggins enjoyed stubbornly engaging in debates with his teammates, particularly Padres pitcher Eric Show, just to provoke reactions from them. He liked to read books and newspapers, and his teammates were turned off by these displays of his intellect. According to Attanasio, players in Baltimore also resented Wiggins because he replaced Rich Dauer, who had been a well-liked member of the team. Lee Lacy was one of Wiggins's few friends on the Orioles. Tony Gwynn suggested that Wiggins was sometimes misunderstood. "To not like Alan Wiggins, is to not know Alan Wiggins," Gwynn said.
