= 1977 San Diego Padres season =

1977 San Diego Padres
- League: National League
- Division: West
- Ballpark: San Diego Stadium
- City: San Diego, California
- Record: 69–93 (.426)
- Divisional place: 5th
- Owners: Ray Kroc
- General managers: Bob Fontaine
- Managers: John McNamara, Alvin Dark
- Television: XETV
- Radio: KOGO (Jerry Coleman, Bob Chandler)

The 1977 San Diego Padres season was the ninth season in franchise history.

== Offseason ==
- October 22, 1976: Diego Seguí was purchased from the Padres by the Seattle Mariners.
- November 5, 1976: Chuck Hartenstein was purchased from the Padres by the Toronto Blue Jays.
- December 14, 1976: Rollie Fingers was signed as a free agent by the Padres.
- December 14, 1976: Gene Tenace was signed as a free agent by the Padres.
- January 25, 1977: Mike Allen (minors) was traded by the Padres to the Houston Astros for Paul Siebert.

== Regular season ==
=== Opening Day starters ===
Opening Day Starters
#	Name	Position
29	Gene Richards	LF
10	Mike Champion	2B
31	Dave Winfield	RF
25	George Hendrick	CF
18	Gene Tenace	C
15	Mike Ivie	1B
12	Doug Rader	3B
6	Bill Almon	SS
35	Randy Jones	P

=== Season standings ===
NL West
Team	W	L	Pct.	GB	Home	Road
Los Angeles Dodgers	98	64	.605	—	51‍–‍30	47‍–‍34
Cincinnati Reds	88	74	.543	10	48‍–‍33	40‍–‍41
Houston Astros	81	81	.500	17	46‍–‍35	35‍–‍46
San Francisco Giants	75	87	.463	23	38‍–‍43	37‍–‍44
San Diego Padres	69	93	.426	29	35‍–‍46	34‍–‍47
Atlanta Braves	61	101	.377	37	40‍–‍41	21‍–‍60

=== Record vs. opponents ===
1977 National League record Sources:
Team	ATL	CHC	CIN	HOU	LAD	MON	NYM	PHI	PIT	SD	SF	STL
Atlanta	—	5–7	4–14	9–9	5–13	6–6	7–5	2–10	3–9	11–7	8–10	1–11
Chicago	7–5	—	7–5	6–6	6–6	10–8	9–9	6–12	7–11	7–5	9–3	7–11
Cincinnati	14–4	5–7	—	5–13	10–8	7–5	10–2	8–4	3–9	11–7	10–8	5–7
Houston	9–9	6–6	13–5	—	9–9	8–4	6–6	4–8	4–8	8–10	9–9	5–7
Los Angeles	13–5	6–6	8–10	9–9	—	7–5	8–4	6–6	9–3	12–6	14–4	6–6
Montreal	6–6	8–10	5–7	4–8	5–7	—	10–8	7–11	7–11	5–7	6–6	12–6
New York	5–7	9–9	2–10	6–6	4–8	8–10	—	5–13	4–14	6–6	7–5	8–10
Philadelphia	10-2	12–6	4–8	8–4	6–6	11–7	13–5	—	8–10	9–3	9–3	11–7
Pittsburgh	9–3	11–7	9–3	8–4	3–9	11–7	14–4	10–8	—	10–2	2–10	9–9
San Diego	7–11	5–7	7–11	10–8	6–12	7–5	6–6	3–9	2–10	—	8–10	8–4
San Francisco	10–8	3–9	8–10	9–9	4–14	6–6	5–7	3–9	10–2	10–8	—	7–5
St. Louis	11–1	11–7	7–5	7–5	6–6	6–12	10–8	7–11	9–9	4–8	5–7	—

=== Notable transactions ===
- May 17, 1977: Butch Metzger was traded by the Padres to the St. Louis Cardinals for John D'Acquisto and Pat Scanlon.
- June 7, 1977: 1977 Major League Baseball draft
  - Barry Evans was drafted by the Padres in the 2nd round.
  - Ozzie Smith was drafted by the Padres in the 4th round.
- June 15, 1977: Bobby Valentine and Paul Siebert were traded by the Padres to the New York Mets for Dave Kingman.
- September 29, 1977: Rick Sawyer was selected off waivers from the Padres by the Montreal Expos.

=== Roster ===
1977 San Diego Padres
Roster
Pitchers: 39 Victor Bernal; 16 John D'Acquisto; 34 Rollie Fingers; 14 Dave Freisleben; 32 Tom Griffin; 35 Randy Jones; 36 Butch Metzger; 44 Bob Owchinko; 27 Rick Sawyer; 47 Bob Shirley; 46 Paul Siebert; 48 Dan Spillner; 22 Brent Strom; 37 Dave Tomlin; 24 Dave Wehrmeister	Catchers: 7 Bob Davis; 3 Dave Roberts; 18 Gene Tenace; Infielders: 6 Bill Almon; 46 Tucker Ashford; 10 Mike Champion; 11 Enzo Hernández; 15 Mike Ivie; 12 Doug Rader; 8 Pat Scanlon; 21 Gary Sutherland; 13 Bobby Valentine	Outfielders: 25 George Hendrick; 26 Dave Kingman; 2 Luis Meléndez; 16 Merv Rettenmund; 29 Gene Richards; 20 Jerry Turner; 31 Dave Winfield; Other batters: 36 Brian Greer	Manager: 1 Alvin Dark; 1 John McNamara; 4 Bob Skinner; Coaches: 5 Joey Amalfitano; 38 Roger Craig; 4 Bob Skinner; 19 Whitey Wietelmann; 28 Don Williams

== Player stats ==
= Indicates team leader

=== Batting ===
==== Starters by position ====
Note: Pos = Position; G = Games played; AB = At bats; H = Hits; Avg. = Batting average; HR = Home runs; RBI = Runs batted in

Pos	Player	G	AB	H	Avg.	HR	RBI
C	Gene Tenace	147	437	102	.233	15	61
1B	Mike Ivie	134	489	133	.272	9	66
2B	Mike Champion	150	507	116	.229	1	43
SS	Bill Almon	155	613	160	.261	2	43
3B	Tucker Ashford	81	249	54	.217	3	24
LF	Gene Richards	146	525	152	.290	5	32
CF	George Hendrick	152	541	168	.311	23	81
RF	Dave Winfield	157	615	169	.275	25	92

==== Other batters ====
Note: G = Games played; AB = At bats; H = Hits; Avg. = Batting average; HR = Home runs; RBI = Runs batted in

Player	G	AB	H	Avg.	HR	RBI
Jerry Turner	118	289	71	.246	10	48
Dave Roberts	82	186	41	.220	1	23
Doug Rader	52	170	46	.271	5	27
Dave Kingman	56	168	40	.238	11	39
Merv Rettenmund	107	126	36	.286	4	17
Gary Sutherland	80	103	25	.243	1	11
Bob Davis	48	94	17	.181	1	10
Pat Scanlon	47	79	15	.190	1	11
Bobby Valentine	44	67	12	.179	1	10
Luis Meléndez	8	3	0	.000	0	0
Enzo Hernández	7	3	0	.000	0	0
Brian Greer	1	1	0	.000	0	0

=== Pitching ===
==== Starting pitchers ====
Note: G = Games pitched; IP = Innings pitched; W = Wins; L = Losses; ERA = Earned run average; SO = Strikeouts

Player	G	IP	W	L	ERA	SO
Bob Shirley	39	214.0	12	18	3.70	146
Bob Owchinko	30	170.0	9	12	4.45	101
Randy Jones	27	147.1	6	12	4.58	44

==== Other pitchers ====
Note: G = Games pitched; IP = Innings pitched; W = Wins; L = Losses; ERA = Earned run average; SO = Strikeouts

Player	G	IP	W	L	ERA	SO
Tom Griffin	38	151.1	6	9	4.46	79
Dave Freisleben	33	138.2	7	9	4.61	72
Rick Sawyer	56	111.0	7	6	5.84	45
Dave Wehrmeister	30	69.2	1	3	6.07	32
John D'Acquisto	17	44.0	1	2	6.95	45
Brent Strom	8	16.2	0	2	12.42	8

==== Relief pitchers ====
Note: G = Games pitched; W = Wins; L = Losses; SV = Saves; ERA = Earned run average; SO = Strikeouts

Player	G	W	L	SV	ERA	SO
Rollie Fingers	78	8	9	35	2.99	113
Dan Spillner	76	7	6	6	3.73	74
Dave Tomlin	76	4	4	3	3.01	55
Butch Metzger	17	0	0	0	5.56	6
Victor Bernal	15	1	1	0	5.31	6
Paul Siebert	4	0	0	0	2.45	1

== Award winners ==
1977 Major League Baseball All-Star Game

- Dave Winfield

== Farm system ==
Level	Team	League	Manager
AAA	Hawaii Islanders	Pacific Coast League	Dick Phillips
AA	Amarillo Gold Sox	Texas League	Dave Campbell
A	Reno Silver Sox	California League	Glenn Ezell
A-Short Season	Walla Walla Padres	Northwest League	Cliff Ditto
