= 1976 San Diego Padres season =

1976 San Diego Padres
- League: National League
- Division: West
- Ballpark: San Diego Stadium
- City: San Diego, California
- Record: 73–89 (.451)
- Divisional place: 5th
- Owners: Ray Kroc
- General managers: Peter Bavasi
- Managers: John McNamara
- Radio: KOGO (Jerry Coleman, Bob Chandler)

The 1976 San Diego Padres season was the eighth season in franchise history.

== Offseason ==
- February 26, 1976: Randy Elliott was released by the Padres.

== Regular season ==
=== Season standings ===
NL West
Team	W	L	Pct.	GB	Home	Road
Cincinnati Reds	102	60	.630	—	49‍–‍32	53‍–‍28
Los Angeles Dodgers	92	70	.568	10	49‍–‍32	43‍–‍38
Houston Astros	80	82	.494	22	46‍–‍36	34‍–‍46
San Francisco Giants	74	88	.457	28	40‍–‍41	34‍–‍47
San Diego Padres	73	89	.451	29	42‍–‍38	31‍–‍51
Atlanta Braves	70	92	.432	32	34‍–‍47	36‍–‍45

=== Record vs. opponents ===
1976 National League record Sources:
Team	ATL	CHC	CIN	HOU	LAD	MON	NYM	PHI	PIT	SD	SF	STL
Atlanta	—	6–6	6–12	7–11	8–10	8–4	4–8	5–7	3–9	10–8	9–9	4–8
Chicago	6–6	—	3–9	5–7	3–9	11–7	5–13	8–10	8–10	6–6	8–4	12–6
Cincinnati	12–6	9–3	—	12–6	13–5	9–3	6–6	5–7	8–4	13–5	9–9	6–6
Houston	11–7	7–5	6–12	—	5–13	10–2	6–6	4–8	2–10	10–8	10–8	9–3
Los Angeles	10–8	9–3	5–13	13–5	—	10–2	7–5	5–7	9–3	6–12	8–10	10–2
Montreal	4–8	7–11	3–9	2–10	2–10	—	8–10	3–15	8–10	4–8	7–5	7–11
New York	8–4	13–5	6–6	6–6	5–7	10–8	—	5–13	10–8	7–5	7–5	9–9
Philadelphia	7-5	10–8	7–5	8–4	7–5	15–3	13–5	—	8–10	8–4	6–6	12–6
Pittsburgh	9–3	10–8	4–8	10–2	3–9	10–8	8–10	10–8	—	7–5	9–3	12–6
San Diego	8–10	6–6	5–13	8–10	12–6	8–4	5–7	4–8	5–7	—	8–10	4–8
San Francisco	9–9	4–8	9–9	8–10	10–8	5–7	5–7	6–6	3–9	10–8	—	5–7
St. Louis	8–4	6–12	6–6	3–9	2–10	11–7	9–9	6–12	6–12	8–4	7–5	—

=== Opening Day starters ===
- Bob Davis
- Willie Davis
- Tito Fuentes
- Johnny Grubb
- Mike Ivie
- Randy Jones
- Doug Rader
- Héctor Torres
- Dave Winfield

=== Notable transactions ===
- April 5, 1976: Rudy Meoli was traded by the Padres to the Cincinnati Reds for Merv Rettenmund.
- April 29, 1976: Tom Dettore was signed as a free agent by the Padres.
- May 19, 1976: Bill Greif was traded by the Padres to the St. Louis Cardinals for Luis Meléndez.
- May 29, 1976: Diego Seguí was signed as a free agent by the Padres.
- June 8, 1976: 1976 Major League Baseball draft
  - Bob Owchinko was drafted by the Padres in the 1st round (5th pick).
  - Craig Stimac was drafted by the Padres in the 9th round.
  - Mark Lee was drafted by the Padres in the 13th round.
  - Broderick Perkins was drafted by the Padres in the 15th round.
- July 10, 1976: Gene Locklear was traded by the Padres to the New York Yankees for a player to be named later. The Yankees completed the deal by sending Rick Sawyer to the Padres on July 31.
- August 30, 1976: Willie McCovey was purchased from the Padres by the Oakland Athletics.

=== Roster ===
1976 San Diego Padres
Roster
Pitchers: 43 Mike Dupree; 26 Rich Folkers; 21 Alan Foster; 14 Dave Freisleben; 27 Bill Greif; 34 Tom Griffin; 40 Jerry Johnson; 35 Randy Jones; 36 Butch Metzger; 44 Bob Owchinko; 34 Ken Reynolds; 27 Rick Sawyer; 48 Dan Spillner; 22 Brent Strom; 37 Dave Tomlin; 24 Dave Wehrmeister	Catchers: 7 Bob Davis; 16 Fred Kendall; Infielders: 6 Bill Almon; 4 Tucker Ashford; 18 Mike Champion; 23 Tito Fuentes; 11 Enzo Hernández; 15 Mike Ivie; 8 Ted Kubiak; 44 Willie McCovey; 12 Doug Rader; 30 Héctor Torres	Outfielders: 3 Willie Davis; 2 Johnny Grubb; 32 Gene Locklear; 25 Luis Meléndez; 16 Merv Rettenmund; 42 Jerry Turner; 13 Bobby Valentine; 31 Dave Winfield	Manager: 1 John McNamara; Coaches: 5 Joey Amalfitano; 38 Roger Craig; 9 Dick Sisler; 19 Whitey Wietelmann

== Player stats ==
= Indicates team leader

=== Batting ===
==== Starters by position ====
Note: Pos = Position; G = Games played; AB = At bats; H = Hits; Avg. = Batting average; HR = Home runs; RBI = Runs batted in

Pos	Player	G	AB	H	Avg.	HR	RBI
C	Fred Kendall	146	456	112	.246	2	39
1B	Mike Ivie	140	405	118	.291	7	70
2B	Tito Fuentes	135	520	137	.263	2	36
3B	Doug Rader	139	471	121	.257	9	55
SS	Enzo Hernández	113	340	87	.256	1	24
LF	Jerry Turner	105	281	75	.267	5	37
CF	Willie Davis	141	493	132	.268	5	46
RF	Dave Winfield	137	492	139	.283	13	69

==== Other batters ====
Note: G = Games played; AB = At bats; H = Hits; Avg. = Batting average; HR = Home runs; RBI = Runs batted in

Player	G	AB	H	Avg.	HR	RBI
Johnny Grubb	109	384	109	.284	5	27
Héctor Torres	74	215	42	.195	4	15
Ted Kubiak	96	212	50	.236	0	26
Willie McCovey	71	202	41	.203	7	36
Merv Rettenmund	86	140	32	.229	2	11
Luis Meléndez	72	119	29	.244	0	5
Bob Davis	51	83	17	.205	0	5
Gene Locklear	43	67	15	.224	0	8
Bill Almon	14	57	14	.246	1	6
Bobby Valentine	15	49	18	.367	0	4
Mike Champion	11	38	9	.237	1	2
Tucker Ashford	4	5	3	.600	0	0

=== Pitching ===
==== Starting pitchers ====
Note: G = Games pitched; IP = Innings pitched; W = Wins; L = Losses; ERA = Earned run average; SO = Strikeouts

Player	G	IP	W	L	ERA	SO
Randy Jones	40	315.1	22	14	2.74	93
Brent Strom	36	210.2	12	16	3.29	103
Dave Freisleben	34	172.0	10	13	3.51	81
Rick Sawyer	13	81.2	5	3	2.53	33
Tom Griffin	11	70.1	4	3	2.94	36
Bill Greif	5	22.1	1	3	8.06	5
Bob Owchinko	2	4.1	0	2	16.62	4

==== Other pitchers ====
Note: G = Games pitched; IP = Innings pitched; W = Wins; L = Losses; ERA = Earned run average; SO = Strikeouts

Player	G	IP	W	L	ERA	SO
Dan Spillner	32	106.2	2	11	5.06	57
Alan Foster	26	86.2	3	6	3.22	22
Dave Wehrmeister	7	19.1	0	4	7.45	10

==== Relief pitchers ====
Note: G = Games pitched; W = Wins; L = Losses; SV = Saves; ERA = Earned run average; SO = Strikeouts

Player	G	W	L	SV	ERA	SO
Butch Metzger	77	11	4	16	2.92	89
Dave Tomlin	49	0	1	0	2.84	43
Rich Folkers	33	2	3	0	5.28	26
Jerry Johnson	24	1	3	0	5.31	27
Ken Reynolds	19	0	3	1	6.40	18
Mike Dupree	12	0	0	0	9.19	5

== Award winners ==
- Randy Jones, National League Cy Young Award
- Butch Metzger, Rookie of the Year

1976 Major League Baseball All-Star Game

== Farm system ==
Level	Team	League	Manager
AAA	Hawaii Islanders	Pacific Coast League	Roy Hartsfield
AA	Amarillo Gold Sox	Texas League	Bob Miller
A	Reno Silver Sox	California League	Johnny Goryl
A-Short Season	Walla Walla Padres	Northwest League	Cliff Ditto

LEAGUE CHAMPIONS: Hawaii, Amarillo, Reno, Walla Walla
Reno affiliation shared with Minnesota Twins
