= 1979 San Diego Padres season =

1979 San Diego Padres
- League: National League
- Division: West
- Ballpark: San Diego Stadium
- City: San Diego, California
- Record: 68–93 (.422)
- Divisional place: 5th
- Owners: Ray Kroc
- General managers: Bob Fontaine
- Managers: Roger Craig
- Television: XETV
- Radio: KFMB (Jerry Coleman, Dave Campbell)

The 1979 San Diego Padres season was the 11th season in franchise history.

== Offseason ==
- October 25, 1978: Oscar Gamble, Dave Roberts and $300,000 were traded by the Padres to the Texas Rangers for Mike Hargrove, Kurt Bevacqua, and Bill Fahey.
- March 1, 1979: Fred Kuhaulua was signed as a free agent by the Padres.

== Regular season ==
=== Season standings ===
NL West
Team	W	L	Pct.	GB	Home	Road
Cincinnati Reds	90	71	.559	—	48‍–‍32	42‍–‍39
Houston Astros	89	73	.549	1½	52‍–‍29	37‍–‍44
Los Angeles Dodgers	79	83	.488	11½	46‍–‍35	33‍–‍48
San Francisco Giants	71	91	.438	19½	38‍–‍43	33‍–‍48
San Diego Padres	68	93	.422	22	39‍–‍42	29‍–‍51
Atlanta Braves	66	94	.412	23½	34‍–‍45	32‍–‍49

=== Record vs. opponents ===
1979 National League record Sources:
Team	ATL	CHC	CIN	HOU	LAD	MON	NYM	PHI	PIT	SD	SF	STL
Atlanta	—	4–8	6–12	7–11	12–6	1–9	4–8	7–5	4–8	6–12	11–7	4–8
Chicago	8–4	—	7–5	6–6	5–7	6–12	8–10	9–9	6–12	9–3	8–4	8–10
Cincinnati	12–6	5–7	—	8–10	11–7	6–6	8–4	8–4	8–4	10–7	6–12	8–4
Houston	11–7	6–6	10–8	—	10–8	7–5	9–3	5–7	4–8	14–4	7–11	6–6
Los Angeles	6–12	7–5	7–11	8–10	—	6–6	9–3	3–9	4–8	9–9	14–4	6–6
Montreal	9–1	12–6	6–6	5–7	6–6	—	15–3	11–7	7–11	7–5	7–5	10–8
New York	8–4	10–8	4–8	3–9	3–9	3–15	—	5–13	8–10	4–8	8–4	7–11
Philadelphia	5–7	9–9	4–8	7–5	9–3	7–11	13–5	—	8–10	9–3	6–6	7–11
Pittsburgh	8–4	12–6	4–8	8–4	8–4	11–7	10–8	10–8	—	7–5	9–3	11–7
San Diego	12–6	3–9	7–10	4–14	9–9	5–7	8–4	3–9	5–7	—	8–10	4–8
San Francisco	7–11	4–8	12–6	11–7	4–14	5–7	4–8	6–6	3–9	10–8	—	5–7
St. Louis	8–4	10–8	4–8	6–6	6–6	8–10	11–7	11–7	7–11	8–4	7–5	—

=== Notable transactions ===
- June 5, 1979: Bob Geren was drafted by the Padres in the 1st round (24th pick) of the 1979 Major League Baseball draft.
- June 15, 1979: Dave Wehrmeister was traded by the Padres to the Yankees for Jay Johnstone.

=== Roster ===
1979 San Diego Padres
Roster
Pitchers: 16 John D'Acquisto; 33 Juan Eichelberger; 34 Rollie Fingers; 35 Randy Jones; 48 Dennis Kinney; 42 Mark Lee; 29 Mickey Lolich; 27 Steve Mura; 44 Bob Owchinko; 36 Gaylord Perry; 41 Eric Rasmussen; 32 Bob Shirley; 49 Tom Tellmann	Catchers: 3 Bill Fahey; 5 Fred Kendall; 18 Gene Tenace; Infielders: 6 Bill Almon; 7 Kurt Bevacqua; 24 Dan Briggs; 4 Paul Dade; 8 Barry Evans; 30 Tim Flannery; 13 Fernando González; 21 Mike Hargrove; 15 Broderick Perkins; 40 Sam Perlozzo; 1 Ozzie Smith; 28 Bobby Tolan	Outfielders: 9 Brian Greer; 21 Jay Johnstone; 26 Don Reynolds; 17 Gene Richards; 20 Jerry Turner; 25 Jim Wilhelm; 31 Dave Winfield	Manager: 38 Roger Craig; Coaches: 23 Chuck Estrada (Pitching); 22 Billy Herman (Hitting); 4 Doug Rader (Third Base); 19 Whitey Wietelmann (Bullpen); 28 Don Williams (First Base)

== Player stats ==
=== Batting ===
==== Starters by position ====
Note: Pos = Position; G = Games played; AB = At bats; H = Hits; Avg. = Batting average; HR = Home runs; RBI = Runs batted in

Pos	Player	G	AB	H	Avg.	HR	RBI
C	Gene Tenace	151	463	122	.263	20	67
1B	Dan Briggs	104	227	47	.207	8	30
2B	Fernando González	114	323	70	.217	9	34
SS	Ozzie Smith	156	587	124	.211	0	27
3B	Paul Dade	76	283	78	.276	1	19
LF	Jerry Turner	138	448	111	.248	9	61
CF	Gene Richards	150	545	152	.279	4	41
RF	Dave Winfield	159	597	184	.308	34	118

==== Other batters ====
Note: G = Games played; AB = At bats; H = Hits; Avg. = Batting average; HR = Home runs; RBI = Runs batted in

Player	G	AB	H	Avg.	HR	RBI
Kurt Bevacqua	114	297	75	.253	1	34
Bill Fahey	73	209	60	.287	3	19
Jay Johnstone	75	201	59	.294	0	32
Bill Almon	100	198	45	.227	1	8
Barry Evans	56	162	35	.216	1	14
Mike Hargrove	52	125	24	.192	0	8
Jim Wilhelm	39	103	25	.243	0	8
Fred Kendall	46	102	17	.167	1	6
Broderick Perkins	57	87	23	.264	0	8
Tim Flannery	22	65	10	.154	0	4
Don Reynolds	30	45	10	.222	0	6
Bobby Tolan	22	21	4	.190	0	2
Brian Greer	4	3	0	.000	0	0
Sam Perlozzo	2	2	0	.000	0	0

=== Pitching ===
==== Starting pitchers ====
Note: G = Games pitched; IP = Innings pitched; W = Wins; L = Losses; ERA = Earned run average; SO = Strikeouts

Player	G	IP	W	L	ERA	SO
Randy Jones	39	263.0	11	12	3.63	112
Gaylord Perry	32	232.2	12	11	3.06	140
Juan Eichelberger	3	21.0	1	1	3.43	12

==== Other pitchers ====
Note: G = Games pitched; IP = Innings pitched; W = Wins; L = Losses; ERA = Earned run average; SO = Strikeouts

Player	G	IP	W	L	ERA	SO
Bob Shirley	49	205.0	8	16	3.38	117
Eric Rasmussen	45	156.2	6	9	3.27	54
Bob Owchinko	42	149.1	6	12	3.74	66
John D'Acquisto	51	133.2	9	13	4.92	137

==== Relief pitchers ====
Note: G = Games pitched; W = Wins; L = Losses; SV = Saves; ERA = Earned run average; SO = Strikeouts

Player	G	W	L	SV	ERA	SO
Rollie Fingers	54	9	9	13	4.52	65
Mark Lee	46	2	4	5	4.29	25
Steve Mura	38	4	4	2	3.08	59
Mickey Lolich	27	0	2	0	4.74	20
Dennis Kinney	13	0	0	0	3.50	11
Tom Tellmann	1	0	0	0	16.88	1

== Awards and honors ==
1979 Major League Baseball All-Star Game

== Farm system ==
Level	Team	League	Manager
AAA	Hawaii Islanders	Pacific Coast League	Dick Phillips
AA	Amarillo Gold Sox	Texas League	Glenn Ezell and Rusty Gerhardt
A	Reno Silver Sox	California League	Eddie Watt
A-Short Season	Walla Walla Padres	Northwest League	Curt Daniels
