= 1978 San Diego Padres season =

1978 San Diego Padres
- League: National League
- Division: West
- Ballpark: San Diego Stadium
- City: San Diego, California
- Record: 84–78 (.519)
- Divisional place: 4th
- Owners: Ray Kroc
- General managers: Bob Fontaine
- Managers: Roger Craig
- Television: XETV (Jerry Gross, Al Schuff)
- Radio: KOGO (Jerry Coleman, Bob Chandler)

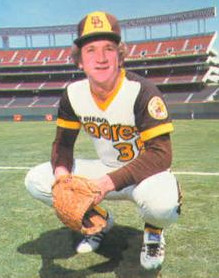
Pitcher Randy Jones in 1978

The 1978 San Diego Padres season was the tenth in franchise history. They finished in fourth place in the National League West with a record of 84–78, eleven games behind the first-place Los Angeles Dodgers. This was the Padres' first-ever winning season.

== Offseason ==
- November 29, 1977: Oscar Gamble was signed as a free agent by the Padres.
- January 10, 1978: Mike Martin was selected in the 1st round (6th pick) of the 1978 draft secondary phase.
- January 25, 1978: Dave Tomlin was traded along with $125,000 by the Padres to the Texas Rangers for Gaylord Perry.
- February 2, 1978: Mickey Lolich was signed as a free agent by the Padres.

== Regular season ==
In 1978, the Padres achieved their first winning season in team history, finishing 84–78 (.519), six games over .500. On June 9, the one-third point of the season, the team stood at 23–31 (.426). The last two-thirds of the season, they went 61–47 (.565), which included a ten-game winning streak from July 25 to August 4. The Padres were also extremely impressive at home that season, going 51–30 (.630).

Notable contributing players:

Gaylord Perry became the second Padre in three seasons to win the National League Cy Young Award, leading the league in wins (21) and winning percentage (.778). Rollie Fingers won the league's Rolaids Relief Award, leading the league in saves (37). As for position players, OF Dave Winfield lead the team with his best offensive season to date (.308, 24 HR, 97 RBI, 21 SB, 151 OPS+). SS Ozzie Smith finished 2nd in the National League Rookie of the Year voting (40 SB). Along with their notable contributions, all 4 players have been inducted into the Baseball Hall of Fame. Along with the 1979 season, this is the only time in franchise history that the Padres had 4 future Hall-of-Famers on their roster.

=== Season standings ===
NL West
Team	W	L	Pct.	GB	Home	Road
Los Angeles Dodgers	95	67	.586	—	54‍–‍27	41‍–‍40
Cincinnati Reds	92	69	.571	2½	49‍–‍31	43‍–‍38
San Francisco Giants	89	73	.549	6	50‍–‍31	39‍–‍42
San Diego Padres	84	78	.519	11	50‍–‍31	34‍–‍47
Houston Astros	74	88	.457	21	50‍–‍31	24‍–‍57
Atlanta Braves	69	93	.426	26	39‍–‍42	30‍–‍51

=== Record vs. opponents ===
1978 National League record Sources:
Team	ATL	CHC	CIN	HOU	LAD	MON	NYM	PHI	PIT	SD	SF	STL
Atlanta	—	5–7	6–12	8–10	5–13	5–7	6–6	8–4	2–10	8–10	11–7	5–7
Chicago	7–5	—	7–5	6–6	4–8	7–11	11–7	4–14	7–11	7–5	4–8	15–3
Cincinnati	12–6	5–7	—	11–7	9–9	8–4	7–5	7–5	4–7	9–9	12–6	8–4
Houston	10–8	6–6	7–11	—	7–11	6–6	7–5	6–6	4–8	8–10	6–12	7–5
Los Angeles	13–5	8–4	9–9	11–7	—	8–4	7–5	7–5	7–5	9–9	11–7	5–7
Montreal	7–5	11–7	4–8	6–6	4–8	—	8–10	9–9	7–11	6–6	5–7	9–9
New York	6–6	7–11	5–7	5–7	5–7	10–8	—	6–12	7–11	5–7	3–9	7–11
Philadelphia	4-8	14–4	5–7	6–6	5–7	9–9	12–6	—	11–7	8–4	6–6	10–8
Pittsburgh	10–2	11–7	7–4	8–4	5–7	11–7	11–7	7–11	—	5–7	4–8	9–9
San Diego	10–8	5–7	9–9	10–8	9–9	6–6	7–5	4–8	7–5	—	8–10	9–3
San Francisco	7–11	8–4	6–12	12–6	7–11	7–5	9–3	6–6	8–4	10–8	—	9–3
St. Louis	7–5	3–15	4–8	5–7	7–5	9–9	11–7	8–10	9–9	3–9	3–9	—

=== Notable transactions ===
- May 26, 1978: George Hendrick was traded to the St. Louis Cardinals for Eric Rasmussen.
- June 5, 1978: Steve Hamrick (minors) was traded to the Kansas City Royals for a player to be named later. The Royals completed the deal by sending Gary Lance to the Padres on September 29.
- June 6, 1978: 1978 Major League Baseball draft
  - Andy Hawkins was selected in the first round (fifth overall).
  - Doug Gwosdz was selected in the second round.
  - Steve Fireovid was selected in the seventh round.
- June 14, 1978: Dan Spillner was traded to the Cleveland Indians for Dennis Kinney.

=== Roster ===
1978 San Diego Padres
Roster
Pitchers: 16 John D'Acquisto; 33 Juan Eichelberger; 34 Rollie Fingers; 14 Dave Freisleben; 35 Randy Jones; 48 Dennis Kinney; 42 Mark Lee; 29 Mickey Lolich; 59 Steve Mura; 44 Bob Owchinko; 36 Gaylord Perry; 41 Eric Rasmussen; 32 Bob Shirley; 48 Dan Spillner; 24 Dave Wehrmeister; 27 Mark Wiley	Catchers: 27 Tony Castillo; 7 Bob Davis; 3 Dave Roberts; 2 Rick Sweet; Infielders: 6 Bill Almon; 12 Tucker Ashford; 21 Chuck Baker; 10 Mike Champion; 8 Barry Evans; 8,13 Fernando González; 15 Broderick Perkins; 1 Ozzie Smith; 18 Gene Tenace	Outfielders: 14 Jim Beswick; 17 Oscar Gamble; 25 George Hendrick; 26 Don Reynolds; 19 Gene Richards; 30 Derrel Thomas; 20 Jerry Turner; 25 Jim Wilhelm; 31 Dave Winfield	Manager: 38 Roger Craig; Coaches: 23 Chuck Estrada (Pitching); 22 Billy Herman (Hitting); -- Doug Rader; 4 Phil Roof (First Base); 9 Whitey Wietelmann (Bullpen); 28 Don Williams (Third Base)

== Player stats ==
= Indicates team leader

=== Batting ===
==== Starters by position ====
Note: Pos = Position; G = Games played; AB = At bats; H = Hits; Avg. = Batting average; HR = Home runs; RBI = Runs batted in

Pos	Player	G	AB	H	Avg.	HR	RBI
C	Rick Sweet	88	226	50	.221	1	11
1B	Gene Tenace	142	401	90	.224	16	61
2B	Fernando González	101	320	80	.250	2	29
SS	Ozzie Smith	159	590	152	.258	1	46
3B	Bill Almon	138	405	102	.252	0	21
LF	Gene Richards	154	555	171	.308	4	45
CF	Derrel Thomas	128	352	80	.227	3	26
RF	Dave Winfield	158	587	181	.308	24	97

==== Other batters ====
Note: G = Games played; AB = At bats; H = Hits; Avg. = Batting average; HR = Home runs; RBI = Runs batted in

Player	G	AB	H	Avg.	HR	RBI
Oscar Gamble	126	375	103	.275	7	47
Jerry Turner	106	225	63	.280	8	37
Broderick Perkins	62	217	52	.240	2	33
Tucker Ashford	75	155	38	.245	3	26
George Hendrick	36	111	27	.243	3	8
Dave Roberts	54	97	21	.216	1	7
Barry Evans	24	90	24	.267	0	4
Don Reynolds	57	87	22	.253	0	10
Chuck Baker	44	58	12	.207	0	3
Mike Champion	32	53	12	.226	0	4
Bob Davis	19	40	8	.200	0	2
Jim Beswick	17	20	1	.050	0	0
Jim Wilhelm	10	19	7	.368	0	4
Tony Castillo	5	8	1	.125	0	1

=== Pitching ===
= Indicates league leader

==== Starting pitchers ====
Note: G = Games pitched; IP = Innings pitched; W = Wins; L = Losses; ERA = Earned run average; SO = Strikeouts

Player	G	IP	W	L	ERA	SO
Gaylord Perry	37	260.2	21	6	2.73	154
Randy Jones	37	253.0	13	14	2.88	71
Bob Owchinko	36	202.1	10	13	3.56	94
Eric Rasmussen	27	146.1	12	10	4.06	59

==== Other pitchers ====
Note: G = Games pitched; IP = Innings pitched; W = Wins; L = Losses; ERA = Earned run average; SO = Strikeouts

Player	G	IP	W	L	ERA	SO
Bob Shirley	50	166.0	8	11	3.69	102
Dave Freisleben	12	26.2	0	3	6.08	16
Mark Wiley	4	7.2	1	0	5.87	1
Steve Mura	5	7.2	0	2	11.74	5

==== Relief pitchers ====
Note: G = Games pitched; W = Wins; L = Losses; SV = Saves; ERA = Earned run average; SO = Strikeouts

Player	G	W	L	SV	ERA	SO
Rollie Fingers	67	6	13	37	2.52	72
John D'Acquisto	45	4	3	10	2.13	104
Mark Lee	56	5	1	2	3.28	31
Mickey Lolich	20	2	1	1	1.56	13
Dan Spillner	17	1	0	0	4.56	16
Dennis Kinney	7	0	1	0	6.43	2
Dave Wehrmeister	4	1	0	0	6.14	2
Juan Eichelberger	3	0	0	0	10.80	2

== Awards and honors ==
- Gaylord Perry, Cy Young Award Winner

=== All-Stars ===
1978 Major League Baseball All-Star Game

- Rollie Fingers
- Dave Winfield

== Farm system ==
Level	Team	League	Manager
AAA	Hawaii Islanders	Pacific Coast League	Dick Phillips
AA	Amarillo Gold Sox	Texas League	Glenn Ezell
A	Reno Silver Sox	California League	Eddie Watt
A-Short Season	Walla Walla Padres	Northwest League	Cliff Ditto
