= Morris Nettles =

American baseball player (1952–2017)

- Outfielder
- Born: January 26, 1952; Los Angeles, California, U.S.
- Died: January 24, 2017 (aged 64); Venice, California, U.S.
- Batted: Left Threw: Left

MLB debut
- April 26, 1974, for the California Angels

Last MLB appearance
- September 28, 1975, for the California Angels

MLB statistics
- Batting average: .247
- Hits: 116
- Runs batted in: 31
- Stats at Baseball Reference

Teams
- California Angels (1974–1975)

Morris Nettles (January 26, 1952 – January 24, 2017) was an American Major League Baseball outfielder who played two seasons with the California Angels in the mid-1970s.

Nettles was drafted by the Angels in the second round of the 1970 Major League Baseball draft out of Venice High School in Los Angeles, California. A speedy runner with good range in the outfield, he batted over .300 in the Angels' farm system to earn a roster spot with the Angels coming out of Spring training 1974. He was demoted back to the triple A Salt Lake City Angels at the end of May with a .222 batting average, three extra base hits, seven runs scored and one stolen base.

Nettles batted .328 with 26 stolen bases and 69 runs scored for Salt Lake City to earn a second chance with the big league club. He made the most of his second chance, batting .292 with nineteen stolen bases and scoring twenty runs at the top of the Angels' batting order.

Nettles was handed the center field job heading into the 1975 campaign, but lost it to Mickey Rivers a month into the season. Playing one of the corner outfield positions and occasionally filling in for Rivers in center the rest of the way, Nettles batted .231 with fifty runs scored. He stole 22 bases, but was caught fifteen times. He and Jim Spencer were traded to the Chicago White Sox for Bill Melton and Steve Dunning on December 11, 1975.

Nettles was one of many young outfielders competing for the White Sox's center field job in Spring training 1976. With Chet Lemon eventually named the Chisox's center fielder, Nettles split the season between the Toledo Mud Hens and Iowa Oaks, batting a combined .232 in his final professional season.

Nettles died from complications of pancreatic cancer on January 24, 2017.
