= Pat Scanlon (third baseman) =

American baseball player (born 1952)

- Third baseman
- Born: September 23, 1952 (age 73); Minneapolis, Minnesota, U.S.
- Batted: Left Threw: Right

MLB debut
- September 27, 1974, for the Montreal Expos

Last MLB appearance
- October 2, 1977, for the San Diego Padres

MLB statistics
- Batting average: .187
- Home runs: 4
- Runs batted in: 28
- Stats at Baseball Reference

Teams
- Montreal Expos (1974–1976); San Diego Padres (1977)

James Patrick Scanlon (born September 23, 1952), also known as Pat Scanlon, is an American former Major League Baseball third baseman. He played all or part of four seasons in the majors, from 1974 until 1977, for the Montreal Expos and San Diego Padres.

== Career ==
Scanlon was originally drafted by the Expos in 1970 after excelling as a three sport athlete at Benilde High School in St. Louis Park, Minnesota. He was traded with Tony Scott and Steve Dunning from the Expos to the St. Louis Cardinals for Bill Greif, Sam Mejías and Ángel Torres on November 8, 1976. All three players coming to St. Louis had spent the 1976 season with the Denver Bears which were led by recently-hired Cardinals manager Vern Rapp. Scanlon batted .308 with 18 home runs and 75 runs batted in (RBI) during that campaign.

After starting the 1977 season in the minor leagues, Scanlon was traded for a second time within a seven-month span, along with John D'Acquisto from the Cardinals to the San Diego Padres for Butch Metzger on May 17, 1977. He returned to the Expos organization in 1978-79, then finished his playing career in the Chicago White Sox farm system in the 1980s.

In 2013, Scanlon was inducted into the first ever class of the Benilde-St. Margaret's Athletic Hall of Fame.

== Personal life ==
As of 2017, Scanlon was an insurance agent for Farmer's Insurance in Eden Prairie, Minnesota. As of 2017, he lived in Richfield, Minnesota with his wife, Carole. Scanlon and his wife had five children, Jessica, James, Patrick, Sallie and Joe. He and his youngest son, Joe, were business partners operating sports and recreation company, Gear Up Sports, which specialized in physical education equipment and school athletic gear.
