= Mike Dupree =

Mike Dupree may refer to:

- Mike Dupree (baseball) (born 1953), Major League Baseball pitcher
- Mike Dupree (music producer), music producer, songwriter and DJ
