= Mike Champion =

Mike Champion may refer to:

- Mike Champion (baseball) (born 1955), Major League Baseball player
- Mike Champion (basketball) (born 1964), American basketball player
