= Steve Dunning =

American baseball player (born 1949)

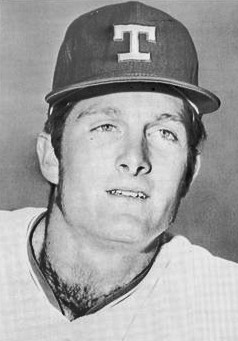
- Dunning in 1974
- Pitcher
- Born: May 15, 1949 (age 77); Denver, Colorado, U.S.
- Batted: Right Threw: Right

MLB debut
- June 14, 1970, for the Cleveland Indians

Last MLB appearance
- September 30, 1977, for the Oakland Athletics

MLB statistics
- Win–loss record: 23–41
- Earned run average: 4.56
- Strikeouts: 390
- Stats at Baseball Reference

Teams
- Cleveland Indians (1970–1973); Texas Rangers (1973–1974); California Angels (1976); Montreal Expos (1976); Oakland Athletics (1977)

Steven John Dunning (born May 15, 1949) is an American former professional baseball player. He played in Major League Baseball as a right-handed pitcher between 1970 and 1977 for the Cleveland Indians, Texas Rangers, California Angels, Montreal Expos and the Oakland Athletics. Dunning was the 1st round draft choice by the Cleveland Indians in the 1970 Major League Baseball draft.

== Baseball career ==
Dunning was born in Denver, Colorado. He was the second player to go straight to the Major Leagues after being drafted without spending a day in the minors. His nickname was "Stunning Steve Dunning," and he was the 1970 Sporting News Pitcher of the Year.

On May 11, 1971, Dunning had the distinction of hitting a grand slam home run off of Oakland Athletics pitcher Diego Seguí. This remained the last grand slam hit by an American League pitcher until Félix Hernández of the Seattle Mariners accomplished the same feat June 23, 2008 in a game against the New York Mets.

He was traded from the Indians to the Rangers for Dick Bosman and Ted Ford on May 10, 1973. He went from the Rangers to the Chicago White Sox for Stan Perzanowski on February 25, 1975. He was dealt for a second time within a year, along with Bill Melton from the White Sox to the Angels for Jim Spencer and Morris Nettles on December 11, 1975. After a campaign in which he went 2–6 with a 4.15 earned run average (ERA) in 32 appearances, he was sent along with Tony Scott and Pat Scanlon from the Expos to the St. Louis Cardinals for Bill Greif, Sam Mejías and Ángel Torres on November 8, 1976. All three players coming to St. Louis had spent some of the 1976 season with the Denver Bears which were led by recently-hired Cardinals manager Vern Rapp.

He became an attorney in 1982. His wife Kim was on Tic Tac Dough in 1983 and won over $10K.

== See also ==
- List of baseball players who went directly to Major League Baseball
