= Derrel Thomas =

American baseball player (born 1951)

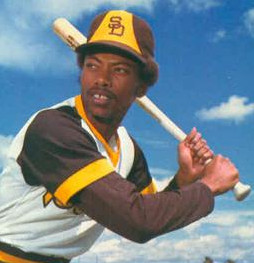
- Thomas in 1978
- Infielder / Outfielder
- Born: January 14, 1951 (age 75); Los Angeles, California, U.S.
- Batted: Switch Threw: Right

MLB debut
- September 14, 1971, for the Houston Astros

Last MLB appearance
- October 5, 1985, for the Philadelphia Phillies

MLB statistics
- Batting average: .249
- Home runs: 43
- Runs batted in: 370
- Stats at Baseball Reference

Teams
- Houston Astros (1971); San Diego Padres (1972–1974); San Francisco Giants (1975–1977); San Diego Padres (1978); Los Angeles Dodgers (1979–1983); Montreal Expos (1984); California Angels (1984); Philadelphia Phillies (1985)

Career highlights and awards
- World Series champion (1981)

Derrel Osbon Thomas (born January 14, 1951) is an American former professional baseball player and manager. He played in Major League Baseball as a second baseman and utility player from 1971 to 1985. Thomas was a member of the 1981 World Series winning Los Angeles Dodgers team. He played every defensive position except pitcher at least once in his career. After his Major League career, Thomas became a minor league manager.

== Early life ==
Thomas attended Susan Miller Dorsey High School in Los Angeles. The school was the alma mater of a number of major-league players, including Sparky Anderson, Chili Davis and Don Buford. The Houston Astros made Thomas the first overall pick in the January 1969 MLB draft and claimed he was a cousin to Houston's recently traded Sonny Jackson. He played 69 games between two teams in the Astros system that year, batting a career-high .302. By 1971, Thomas had made his major-league debut, playing six games for the Astros.

== Career Beginnings ==
In a major-league career that lasted through 1985, Thomas played for eight teams, mostly on the West Coast. In one of his best seasons, he hit .276 for the 1975 San Francisco Giants, collecting 48 runs batted in and 28 stolen bases, both career highs.

He was traded along with Bill Greif and Mark Schaeffer from the Astros to the San Diego Padres for Dave Roberts on December 3, 1971. He was dealt from the Padres to the Giants for Tito Fuentes and Butch Metzger at the Winter Meetings on December 6, 1974.

Thomas was considered the key to the deal.

== San Diego Padres (1972-1974) ==
He started at second base on Opening Day 1972 for San Diego and notched the first three hits of his big league career, recording a bunt single and stolen base off Phil Niekro in a four-run sixth inning that carried the Padres to a 6-5 win. Thomas wore #30 in honor of his baseball idol, Maury Wills. Thomas would wear #30 several different times during the course of his career.

A month later, Thomas had angered Padres manager Preston Gómez when he refused to fasten his seat belt on a flight and the pilot threatened to throw the team off the plane unless Thomas complied.

When Gomez was fired after a slow start, Thomas also clashed with new manager Don Zimmer, in his first managerial position. On June 20, Thomas, who was inserted into the game against the St. Louis Cardinals that day as a second baseman, bobbled a two-out grounder in the bottom of the 10th to allow Lou Brock to score the winning run.

“Somebody’s going to Alexandria,” the Associated Press quoted Zimmer saying to Thomas following the game, referring to the Padres’ Double-A affiliate in the Texas League. “It’s either going to be you or me.” In fact, Thomas was sent to Triple-A Hawaii for two weeks, and returned to the Padres on July 4. He played regularly the rest of the season and finished with a .230 batting average, 15 doubles, five triples, five homers and 36 RBI in 130 games.

The following season, Thomas began the season in a utility role and regularly started at second base and shortstop. In 113 games, he hit .238 with 22 RBI and 15 steals. But he struggled defensively at shortstop, where he was charged with 32 errors in just 74 games. He was involved with a brawl in a game against the Philadelphia Phillies where it was alleged he threw his bat at Phillies pitcher Ron Schueler after a brushback pitch.

It was during his time with the Padres that veteran Bobby Tolan roomed with and mentored Thomas. Thomas told UPI that "nobody has helped me as much as he (Tolan) has. He's always talking to me and when he does criticize, it's criticism that's constructive, not destructive. If I have a good year, Bobby deserves a lot of the credit because we talk baseball all the time and he has shown me a lot of things that have helped me."

Thomas said that he was often immature and unable to deal with the stressors of the game. Dusty Baker became fond of Thomas while they played for the Dodgers, but many people in baseball found Thomas to be an agitator. "Let's put it this way: Derrel Thomas does things that make it easy to hate him," Dodgers teammate Reggie Smith said. Padres manager Roger Craig said Thomas "plays hard and he's a showman-type player... If he has to play the villain role to get attention, he'll do it." After the 1985 season, Thomas' name was brought up in the Pittsburgh drug trials. Though he was not suspended, he was unable to find another major-league team to sign with. He signed with an independent team, the San Jose Bees, but he did not fit in well with his teammates and he was cut before the 1986 season started.

Following his playing career, Thomas briefly coached at Los Angeles City College and was the first manager of the Boise Hawks in 1987, then an independent team in the Class A-Short Season Northwest League. In June of that year, the Hawks faced the Bend Bucks, managed by Mel Roberts, marking the first time outside of Negro league baseball that two black managers faced each other in a professional regular-season game.

Thomas was fired during his first season in Boise. By 1988, he was managing a bar and coaching baseball at Leuzinger High School in Lawndale, California. Before a 1989 game, several players were late for the team bus, and though the players drove to their game, he would not allow them to play. Several players quit the team in protest and Thomas resigned.

In December 1991, Thomas was hired as a baseball coach at Dorsey High School. In March, a Dorsey baseball player fatally shot himself on the team bus while playing Russian roulette. Thomas was arrested the next month for attempting to purchase 22 pounds (10 kg) of cocaine. He was placed on probation; his probation was extended after a 1997 drug possession arrest.

As of 2009, he was a member of the Los Angeles Dodgers organization serving as a representative of the Dodgers Legend Bureau. In that role, he continues to spread goodwill and service to the community. In September 2026, he represented the Dodgers at an event in San Bernardino to promote reading among school-aged children.
