= Bill Greif =

American baseball player (born 1950)

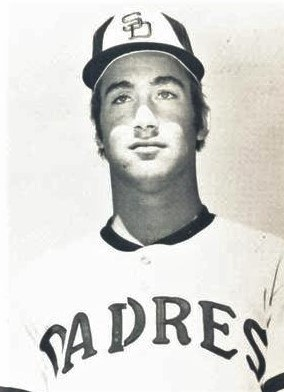
- Pitcher
- Born: April 25, 1950 (age 76); Fort Stockton, Texas, U.S.
- Batted: Right Threw: Right

MLB debut
- July 19, 1971, for the Houston Astros

Last MLB appearance
- September 24, 1976, for the St. Louis Cardinals

MLB statistics
- Win–loss record: 31–67
- Earned run average: 4.41
- Strikeouts: 442
- Stats at Baseball Reference

Teams
- Houston Astros (1971); San Diego Padres (1972–1976); St. Louis Cardinals (1976)

William Briley Greif (/ɡraɪf/ GRYFE; born April 25, 1950) is an American former professional baseball pitcher. He played all or part of six seasons in Major League Baseball, from 1971 to 1976, for the Houston Astros, San Diego Padres, and St. Louis Cardinals.

== Astros ==
Greif graduated from John H. Reagan High School (Austin, Texas). He was drafted in the 3rd round of the 1968 Major League Baseball draft by the Astros, making his major league debut with them three years later. He was traded along with Derrel Thomas and Mark Schaeffer from the Astros to the Padres for Dave Roberts on December 3, 1971.

== Padres ==
Greif pitched four full seasons and part of a fifth with the Padres. A knuckle-curve specialist, he was the team's Opening Day starter in 1974, then in 1975 he was moved full-time to the bullpen. After moving back to the starting rotation to start the 1976 season, he made five starts for the Padres before being dealt to the Cardinals for Luis Meléndez on May 19.

== Remaining career ==
The Cardinals moved Greif back to the bullpen once again, and he had a 1–5 record in 47 appearances. He was sent along with Sam Mejías and Ángel Torres from the Cardinals to the Montreal Expos for Tony Scott, Steve Dunning and Pat Scanlon on November 8, 1976. The Expos did not re-sign him for the 1977 season, and he was released on March 30. After sitting out the 1977 season, Greif signed with the New York Mets organization in 1978. He appeared in three games for the Tidewater Tides that year, his final professional season.
