= Sam Mejías =

Dominican baseball player (born 1952)

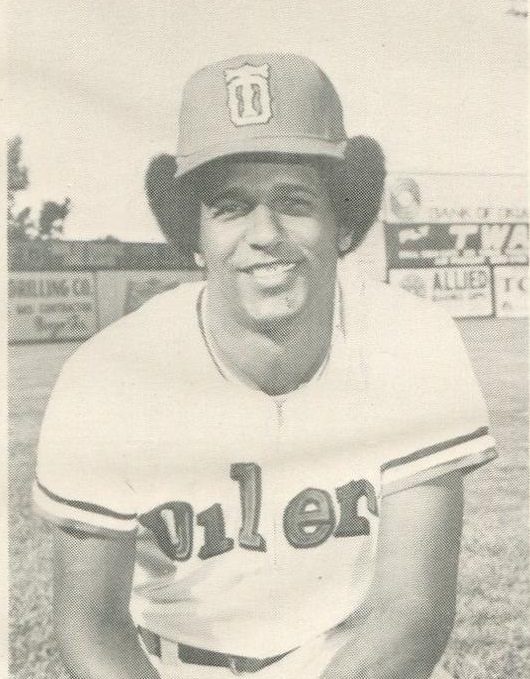
- Mejías with the Tulsa Oilers
- Outfielder / Coach
- Born: May 9, 1952 (age 74); Santiago de los Caballeros, Dominican Republic
- Batted: Right Threw: Right

MLB debut
- September 6, 1976, for the St. Louis Cardinals

Last MLB appearance
- October 3, 1981, for the Cincinnati Reds

MLB statistics
- Batting average: .247
- Home runs: 4
- Runs batted in: 31
- Stats at Baseball Reference

Teams
- As player: St. Louis Cardinals (1976); Montreal Expos (1977–1978); Chicago Cubs (1979); Cincinnati Reds (1979–1981); As coach: Seattle Mariners (1993–1999); Baltimore Orioles (2007)

Samuel Elías Mejías (muh-HEE-us, born May 9, 1952) is a Dominican former outfielder and coach in Major League Baseball who played from 1976 through 1981 for the St. Louis Cardinals (1976), Montreal Expos (1977–78), Chicago Cubs (1979) and Cincinnati Reds (1979–81). He later was a minor league manager then first base coach in the majors for the Seattle Mariners and Baltimore Orioles.

== Baseball career ==
=== Minor Leagues ===
Mejías signed as a minor league free agent on October 24, 1970 with the Milwaukee Brewers. On June 23, 1976, the Brewers sent Mejías to the St. Louis Cardinals to complete the earlier deal made on June 7, 1976, when the Brewers traded a player to be named later to St. Louis for Danny Frisella.

=== St Louis Cardinals ===
Mejías made his major league debut on September 6, 1976. He would play 17 games for the Cardinals, batting .143.

=== Montreal Expos ===
Mejías was traded along with Bill Greif and Ángel Torres from the Cardinals to the Montreal Expos for Tony Scott, Steve Dunning and Pat Scanlon on November 8, 1976.

=== Cincinnati Reds ===
Mejías' contract was purchased by the Cincinnati Reds. Mejías only appeared in 7 games for the Reds in 1979, but he had two serviceable years as a part-time player for the Reds in 1980 and 1981 batting .278 and .286 respectively. He was released by the Reds after their 1981 season.

=== Career ===
In a six-season career, Mejías was a .247 hitter with four home runs and 31 RBI in 334 games, including 51 runs, 13 doubles, two triples, and eight stolen bases. Mejías was regarded as a good defensive outfielder.

== Coaching and managing career ==
Following his playing career, Mejías managed from 1983 to 1992 in the Cincinnati Reds minor league system. He later was a first base coach in the majors for the Seattle Mariners (1993–1999) and Baltimore Orioles (2007).

== Personal life ==
Mejías is married and has four children.

Mejías's brother Marcos also played professional baseball.

== See also ==
- List of players from Dominican Republic in Major League Baseball

Sporting positions
Preceded by Franchise established	Gulf Coast League Red Sox manager 1989	Succeeded by Félix Maldonado
Preceded by Rick Dempsey	Baltimore Orioles First Base Coach; 2007	Succeeded by John Shelby
