= Lou Marone =

American baseball player (1945–2015)

- Pitcher
- Born: December 3, 1945; San Diego, California, U.S.
- Died: November 27, 2015 (aged 69); San Diego, California, U.S.
- Batted: Right Threw: Left

MLB debut
- May 30, 1969, for the Pittsburgh Pirates

Last MLB appearance
- April 18, 1970, for the Pittsburgh Pirates

MLB statistics
- Win–loss record: 1–1
- Earned run average: 2.63
- Innings pitched: 37 2/3
- Strikeouts: 25
- Stats at Baseball Reference

Teams
- Pittsburgh Pirates (1969–1970)

Louis Stephen Marone (December 3, 1945 – November 27, 2015) was an American professional baseball player, a left-handed relief pitcher who appeared in 30 Major League Baseball games as a member of the 1969–1970 Pittsburgh Pirates. He was the cousin of former major league pitcher John D'Acquisto.

== Career ==
Selected by Pittsburgh in the 30th round of the 1965 Major League Baseball draft, the 5 ft 10 in (1.78 m), 185 lb (84 kg) Marone attended San Diego City College and San Diego Mesa College.

Marone was recalled by the Pirates in May 1969, his fifth professional season, after a strong early season for the Double-A York Pirates, where he won two of three decisions and posted six saves and an earned run average of 0.93 in 17 games and 29 innings pitched, all in relief. As a Pittsburgh rookie, he appeared in 29 games allowing 24 hits and 13 bases on balls in 34 1/3 innings. Of the ten earned runs Marone allowed in 1969, six came in two rough outings against the St. Louis Cardinals. One final appearance in early 1970, also against the Cardinals, concluded his MLB career. Altogether he split his two decisions, and gave up 26 hits in 37 2/3 innings during his big league career, with 25 strikeouts and no saves.

Marone's eight-year pro career concluded in minor league baseball, in the Pirates' organization, in 1972.
