= Mark Schaeffer =

American baseball player (1948–2022)

- Pitcher
- Born: June 5, 1948; Santa Monica, California, U.S.
- Died: June 1, 2022 (aged 73); West Hills, California, U.S.
- Batted: Left Threw: Left

MLB debut
- April 18, 1972, for the San Diego Padres
- Stats at Baseball Reference

Teams
- San Diego Padres (1972)

Mark Philip Schaeffer (June 5, 1948 – June 1, 2022) was an American professional baseball player. He played in Major League Baseball as a left-handed pitcher for the San Diego Padres in 1972. He batted and threw left-handed.

Schaeffer was born on June 5, 1948 in Santa Monica, California, and attended Grover Cleveland High School in Reseda, California. He was drafted by the Boston Red Sox in the second round of the 1966 Major League Baseball draft. He was traded along with Derrel Thomas and Bill Greif from the Astros to the Padres for Dave Roberts on December 3, 1971. Schaeffer made his major league debut on April 18, 1972, at the age of 23 with the San Diego Padres.

Schaeffer was strictly a relief pitcher in MLB (41 appearances, zero starts). On July 29, 1972, during a 17 inning, 4–3 victory over the Reds, Schaffer picked up his lone MLB save by retiring the final batter of the game.

Schaeffer died June 1, 2022.
