= Bob Fontaine Jr. =

American baseball scout (1953-2026)

Bob Fontaine Jr. (May 3, 1953 – October 3, 2026) was an American baseball scout for the Toronto Blue Jays of Major League Baseball.

== Biography ==
The son of Bob Fontaine Sr., he scouted for the San Diego Padres from 1974 to 1980. He was the Montreal Expos West Coast scouting director in 1982, and he was the scouting director for the California/Anaheim Angels from 1987 to 1999. He was the Director of Player Development for the Chicago White Sox from 2001 to 2003, and he was the scouting director for the Seattle Mariners from 2004 to 2008. As of 2014 he was a member of Toronto's professional scouting department.

Fontaine died on October 3, 2026, at the age of 73.
