= Ángel Torres (baseball) =

Dominican baseball player (1952–2025)

- Pitcher
- Born: October 24, 1952; La Ciénaga, Dominican Republic
- Died: February 1, 2025 (aged 72); Azua, Dominican Republic
- Batted: Left Threw: Left

MLB debut
- September 12, 1977, for the Cincinnati Reds

Last MLB appearance
- October 2, 1977, for the Cincinnati Reds

MLB statistics
- Win–loss record: 0–0
- Earned run average: 2.16
- Strikeouts: 8
- Stats at Baseball Reference

Teams
- Cincinnati Reds (1977)

Ángel Rafael Torres Ruiz (October 24, 1952 – February 1, 2025) was a Dominican Major League Baseball pitcher who played in 1977 with the Cincinnati Reds. He batted and threw left-handed. Torres had a 0–0 record, with a 2.16 ERA, in five games, in his one-year career. He was signed by the St. Louis Cardinals in 1971 as an amateur free agent. He was traded along with Bill Greif and Sam Mejías from the Cardinals to the Montreal Expos for Tony Scott, Steve Dunning and Pat Scanlon on November 8, 1976. He was then dealt to the Reds early in the 1977 season. Torres died on February 1, 2025, at the age of 72.
