= Tony Scott (baseball) =

American baseball player (1951–2024)

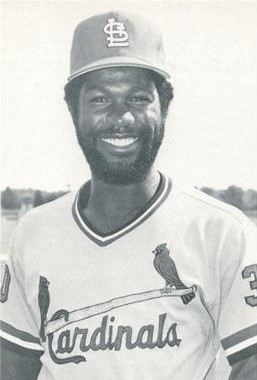
- Center fielder
- Born: September 18, 1951; Cincinnati, Ohio, U.S.
- Died: May 26, 2024 (aged 72); Cincinnati, Ohio, U.S.
- Batted: Switch Threw: Right

MLB debut
- September 1, 1973, for the Montreal Expos

Last MLB appearance
- September 21, 1984, for the Montreal Expos

MLB statistics
- Batting average: .249
- Home runs: 17
- Runs batted in: 253
- Stats at Baseball Reference

Teams
- Montreal Expos (1973–1975); St. Louis Cardinals (1977–1981); Houston Astros (1981–1984); Montreal Expos (1984)

Anthony Scott (September 18, 1951 – May 26, 2024) was an American professional baseball center fielder and coach. He played for the Montreal Expos, St. Louis Cardinals, and Houston Astros of Major League Baseball from 1973 to 1984.

== Career ==
=== Montreal Expos ===
Scott attended Withrow High School in Cincinnati, Ohio. The Montreal Expos selected Scott in the 71st round of the 1969 Major League Baseball draft, and he signed with the Expos. After five seasons in their farm system, he received a September call-up to the Expos in 1973. He appeared in eleven games as a pinch runner, and received only one at-bat, in which he struck out. He spent most of the 1974 season in the minor leagues, receiving a September call-up and batting 2-for-7.

The Expos named Scott their starting centerfielder in 1975. He batted .191 with eleven runs batted in and no home runs through the All-Star break, and was replaced in center by Pepe Mangual for the rest of the season. He spent all of 1976 with the Triple-A Denver Bears, batting .311 with 18 stolen bases in 106 games.

=== St. Louis Cardinals ===
The Expos traded Scott, Steve Dunning, and Pat Scanlon to the St. Louis Cardinals for Bill Greif, Sam Mejías and Ángel Torres on November 8, 1976. All three players coming to St. Louis had spent the 1976 season with the Denver Bears which were led by recently hired Cardinals manager Vern Rapp.

Scott batted .291 with three home runs and 41 RBIs sharing playing time with Jerry Mumphrey during his first season in St. Louis. After falling into a fourth outfielder role in 1978, he was given the starting centerfield job in 1979. He responded by hitting six home runs while driving in 68 runs and stealing 37 bases, all career highs.

=== Houston Astros ===
The Cardinals traded Scott to the Houston Astros for Joaquín Andújar on June 6, 1981. He was hitting .227 and mired in a 2-for-43 slump at the time of the transaction. He had also fallen behind Dane Iorg and Tito Landrum on the team's outfielder depth chart.

Scott batted .293 and provided a steady glove in centerfield in the spacious Astrodome his first season in Houston. He was the starting centerfielder again in 1982, but after batting .239 with one home run and 29 RBIs, he was relegated to a fourth outfielder role in 1983. Released by the Astros after hitting .190 in 25 games, he returned to the Expos two weeks later on June 29, 1984.

== Coaching career ==
In 1989, Scott joined the Philadelphia Phillies organization as a minor league coach. He joined the major league coaching staff for the 2000 and 2001 seasons.

== Death ==
Scott died in Cincinnati on May 26, 2024, at the age of 72.
