= Victor Bernal (baseball) =

American baseball player

- Pitcher
- Born: October 6, 1953; Los Angeles, California, U.S.
- Died: September 2, 2006 (aged 52); Arcadia, California, U.S.
- Batted: Right Threw: Right

MLB debut
- April 6, 1977, for the San Diego Padres

Last MLB appearance
- May 17, 1977, for the San Diego Padres

MLB statistics
- Win–loss record: 1–1
- Earned run average: 5.31
- Strikeouts: 6

Teams
- San Diego Padres (1977)

Victor Hugo Bernal (October 6, 1953 – September 2, 2006) was a Major League Baseball pitcher who played for one season. Bernal was drafted by the San Diego Padres in the 6th round of the 1975 Major League Baseball draft. He played for the San Diego Padres for 15 games during the 1977 San Diego Padres season.
