= Tito Fuentes =

Cuban baseball player (born 1944)

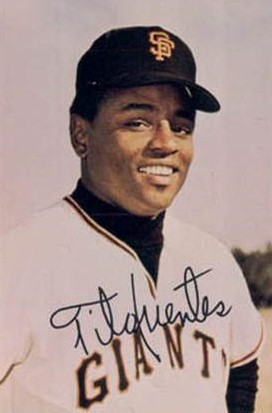
- Second baseman
- Born: January 4, 1944 (age 82); Havana, Cuba
- Batted: Switch Threw: Right

MLB debut
- August 18, 1965, for the San Francisco Giants

Last MLB appearance
- July 9, 1978, for the Oakland Athletics

MLB statistics
- Batting average: .268
- Home runs: 45
- Runs batted in: 438
- Stats at Baseball Reference

Teams
- San Francisco Giants (1965–1967, 1969–1974); San Diego Padres (1975–1976); Detroit Tigers (1977); Oakland Athletics (1978)

Career highlights and awards
- San Francisco Giants Wall of Fame
Medals
Representing Cuba
Amateur World Series
| Gold medal – first place | 1961 San José | Team |

Rigoberto "Tito" Fuentes Peat (born January 4, 1944) is a Cuban former professional baseball player. He played for 13 seasons in the major leagues between 1965 and 1978, primarily as a second baseman. Fuentes played for most of his career with the San Francisco Giants.

== Professional career ==
The Giants initially signed Fuentes as an 18-year-old amateur before the start of the 1962 season. Fuentes, along with Bert Campaneris, was playing with the Cuba national baseball team at the 1961 Amateur World Series. He was one of the last baseball players signed directly out of Cuba in the immediate aftermath of the Cuban Revolution.

Fuentes made his major league debut on August 18, 1965. Four days later, he was involved in one of the most famous baseball fights in history, a 14-minute brawl between the Giants and Los Angeles Dodgers in which Juan Marichal bloodied John Roseboro with a bat; Fuentes, the on-deck hitter when the fight broke out, brandished his own bat as he rushed to join the fray, though he did not hit anyone with it. Fuentes split time between second base and shortstop as a rookie in 1966. He batted .261 in his maiden year while playing solid defense at both positions. He slumped to batting .209 the following year, and subsequently, he spent all of 1968 in the minor leagues.

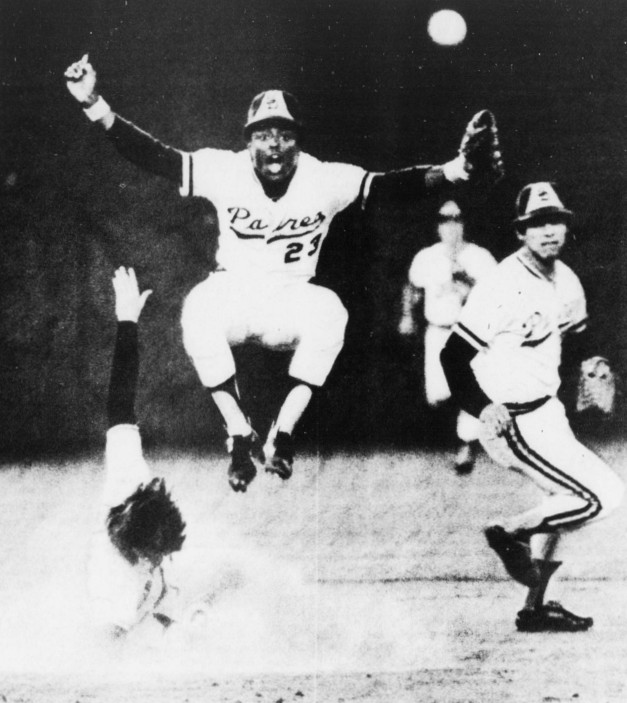
Fuentes (#23), San Francisco Giants at San Diego Padres, June 24, 1975 (first game of twi-night doubleheader)

Fuentes returned to the Giants in 1969 and spent the next two seasons as a utility infielder before re-gaining his starting spot at second base in 1971. He appeared in the postseason during the 1971 season as his Giants won the NL West title; his two-run home run in Game 1 of the 1971 NLCS helped San Francisco take an early series lead against the Pittsburgh Pirates, but that would turn out to be the Giants' only win of the best-of-five series. Fuentes continued to be the Giants' second baseman for three more seasons. In 1973, he set a National League record by recording a .993 fielding percentage, the highest for any regular second baseman in league history. Ironically, Fuentes had led all National League second basemen in errors during the previous two seasons before setting the new record for excellence. His record stood for 13 seasons before Ryne Sandberg recorded a .994 percentage at second in 1986.

He was dealt along with Butch Metzger from the Giants to the Padres for Derrel Thomas at the Winter Meetings on December 6, 1974. Fuentes played for two seasons in San Diego before leaving as a free agent. In 1977, Fuentes played with the Detroit Tigers and had a career-best .309 batting average. Despite having his best season, he was not brought back in 1978 (since the Tigers had a young Lou Whitaker waiting in the wings). The Montreal Expos then purchased his contract. Before the start of the season, however, Fuentes was released. During the year, he signed with the Oakland Athletics, but he was released again after batting just .140 in only 13 games. He played for the Santo Domingo Azucareros in the short-lived Inter-American League in 1979 before retiring.

In Willie Mays's May 14, 1972, debut game at Shea Stadium with the New York Mets, Fuentes of the visiting Giants had a single, two doubles, a home run, and a base on balls in five plate appearances.

Fuentes played baseball with elan, style and flair. He pioneered the use of headbands, sometimes applying them on the outside of his baseball cap. He would approach the plate holding his bat by the barrel, tap it handle-first off the plate, flip it into the air and catch it by the handle, ready to hit. He was called "one of the most renowned hot dogs in baseball history" in Sparky Lyle's 1979 book The Bronx Zoo. Elan and flair was not always accepted by staid ballplayers. Pitchers would knock him down with inside pitches for no apparent reason. After one such event, he was quoted as saying, "They shouldn't throw at me. I'm the father of five or six kids."

== Broadcasting career ==
Fuentes returned to the Giants as a radio announcer in 1981, the team's first year of Spanish language radio broadcasts, initially serving in this role until 1992. In 2004, Fuentes was brought back as an analyst, and he remains with the team in this role today. Tito Fuentes was inducted into the Hispanic Heritage Baseball Museum Hall of Fame on February 23, 2002, in San Francisco, California.
