= Tom Tellmann =

American baseball player (born 1954)

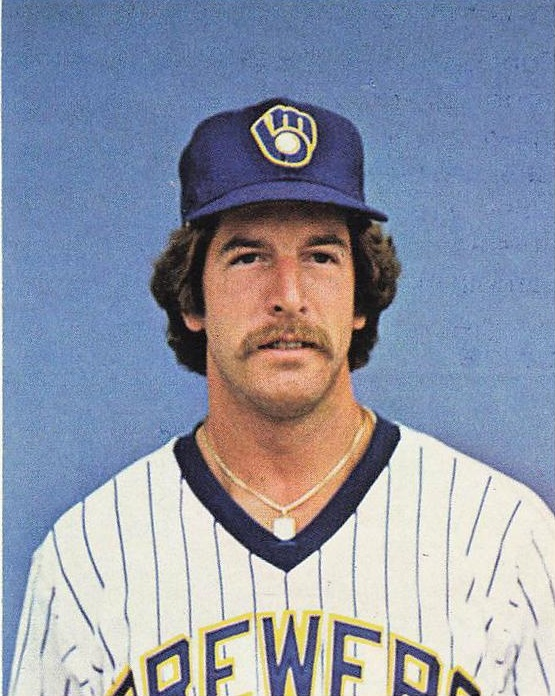
- Pitcher
- Born: March 29, 1954 (age 72); Warren, Pennsylvania, U.S.
- Batted: Right Threw: Right

MLB debut
- June 9, 1979, for the San Diego Padres

Last MLB appearance
- June 2, 1985, for the Oakland Athletics

MLB statistics
- Win–loss record: 18-7
- Earned run average: 3.05
- Strikeouts: 94
- Stats at Baseball Reference

Teams
- San Diego Padres (1979–1980); Milwaukee Brewers (1983–1984); Oakland Athletics (1985)

Thomas John Tellmann (born March 29, 1954) is an American former professional baseball pitcher. He played in Major League Baseball (MLB) for the San Diego Padres from 1979 to 1980, the Milwaukee Brewers from 1983 to 1984, and the Oakland Athletics in 1985.

In 227 innings pitched over 112 appearances, Tellmann accepted 65 total chances (15 putouts, 50 assists) without an error for a perfect 1.000 fielding percentage in his major league career.
