= Barry Evans (baseball) =

American baseball player (born 1955)

- Third baseman
- Born: November 30, 1955 (age 70); Atlanta, Georgia, U.S.
- Batted: Right Threw: Right

MLB debut
- September 4, 1978, for the San Diego Padres

Last MLB appearance
- October 3, 1982, for the New York Yankees

MLB statistics
- Batting average: .251
- Home runs: 2
- Runs batted in: 41
- Stats at Baseball Reference

Teams
- San Diego Padres (1978–1981); New York Yankees (1982)

Barry Steven Evans (born November 30, 1955) is an American former Major League Baseball third baseman. He played all or part of five seasons in the major leagues from 1978 until 1982. He was born in Atlanta, Georgia.

== Pro career ==
Barry Evans was drafted by the New York Mets in the 8th round of the June MLB draft out of West Georgia. Evans did not sign with the Mets. He was drafted again the next season, this time by the San Diego Padres in the second round. Evans, upon being drafted, reported to the Padres minor league affiliate in Walla Walla. In his first season of pro ball, Evans batted .358 and slugged 11 home runs for the single A team. The next season, Evans was promoted to San Diego's Double-A team in Amarillo. There again, Evans showed his power at the plate by hitting ten home runs, and again batted over .300. The Padres rushed Evans to the big leagues, recalling him from Amarillo to the major league club, thus bypassing the Triple-A level.

On September 4, 1978, Evans made his major league debut in Atlanta against the Braves. Evans started at third and was part of an infield that included Gene Tenace at first, Mike Champion at second, and future Hall of Famer Ozzie Smith at shortstop. Evans made an impressive debut, getting three hits in six at bats and driving in a run as the Padres easily beat the Braves 8-4, with Gaylord Perry earning his 16th win of the season. While Evans excelled at the plate, he did make an error in his MLB debut.

Overall in his first season in the majors, Evans played in 24 games, batted .267 and drove in four runs. Evans made the Padres to start the 1979 season. He played 56 games while serving as an understudy to incumbent third baseman Paul Dade. While he did hit his first home run in the majors, he struggled at the plate, hitting only .216. Evans refused a demotion to Double-A and told the team that he would be stepping away from baseball to pursue a professional tennis career, a pursuit which would ultimately be unsuccessful.

In 1980, Evans returned to baseball and played the role of utility infielder, with Luis Salazar taking over the role of back-up third baseman. With the exception of Ozzie Smith, the entire infield saw turn over from the previous season, with former starter Dade reduced to a back-up as well. While Evans appeared in 73 games and his batting average improved, his ability to hit the long ball that he showed in the minors had failed to materialize in the majors. In 1981, Evans appeared in fewer games, with Tim Flannery getting more time as the main utility infielder. Even though there were multiple changes again in the Padres infield, Evans failed to capture a starting spot, as Salazar had passed Evans and was now the Padres starting third baseman.

In 1982, former Oakland A's manager Dick Williams took over as manager of the Padres. While San Diego enjoyed a .500 season, Evans was no longer there. Evans was acquired by the New York Yankees and split his time between the parent club and their Triple-A team, the Columbus Clippers. Evans played in his last major league game, going hitless against the Boston Red Sox. After playing in the minors in 1984, Evans signed with the Cleveland Indians in hopes of making it back to the majors. After spending three seasons with The Indians' Triple A team in Maine, Evans retired from baseball in 1986.
