= Butch Metzger =

American baseball player (born 1952)

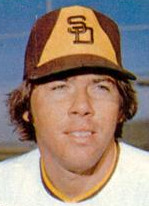
- Pitcher
- Born: May 23, 1952 (age 74); Lafayette, Indiana, U.S.
- Batted: Right Threw: Right

MLB debut
- September 8, 1974, for the San Francisco Giants

Last MLB appearance
- June 28, 1978, for the New York Mets

MLB statistics
- Win–loss record: 18–9
- Earned run average: 3.74
- Strikeouts: 175
- Stats at Baseball Reference

Teams
- San Francisco Giants (1974); San Diego Padres (1975–1977); St. Louis Cardinals (1977); New York Mets (1978)

Career highlights and awards
- NL Rookie of the Year (1976)

Clarence Edward Metzger (born May 23, 1952) is an American professional baseball scout and former pitcher who played five seasons in Major League Baseball (MLB). Initially drafted by the San Francisco Giants, he played two-and-a-half seasons with the San Diego Padres. Metzger was named the National League (NL) Rookie of the Year in 1976, his first full year in the major leagues.

== Professional career ==
After playing high school baseball at John F. Kennedy High School in Sacramento, California, Metzger was drafted in the 2nd round of the 1970 amateur draft by the San Francisco Giants.

Metzger made his major league debut on September 8, 1974, with the Giants. He played limitedly, pitching 12.7 innings and posting a 3.55 ERA.

He was dealt along with Tito Fuentes from the Giants to the Padres for Derrel Thomas at the Winter Meetings on December 6, 1974. Metzger pitched limitedly again, having control issues (he had walked 16 men in his 17.3 innings of career pitching).

In 1976, Metzger was able to successfully control his pitches, and had a great year for a rookie. He posted a 2.92 ERA, along with an 11–4 record, 89 strikeouts, 52 walks and 16 saves in 123.3 innings of work. He was co-voted National League Rookie of the Year for 1976 with Pat Zachry.

With a 0–0 record, a 5.87 ERA and having given up 27 hits in 22 2/3 innings in 17 appearances to start the 1977 season, Metzger was traded from the Padres to the Cardinals for John D'Acquisto and Pat Scanlon on May 17, 1977. Metzger posted better numbers with the Cardinals, collecting 7 saves while posting a 3.11 ERA and a record of 4 wins and 2 losses.

However, Metzger was placed on waivers by the Cardinals and picked up by the New York Mets on April 5, 1978. Metzger had a disappointing season, giving concern to the Mets about his control issues. His contract was subsequently purchased by the Philadelphia Phillies on July 4, 1978, and he was sent back to the minors. Metzger never made it back to the major league level and was released by the Phillies on March 19, 1979.

He works today as a scout.

In his five seasons of baseball, Metzger had an 18–9 record with a 3.74 ERA and 23 saves. He pitched 293.1 innings, gave up 289 hits, walked 140, and struck out 175.
