= Luis Meléndez (baseball) =

Puerto Rican baseball player (born 1949)

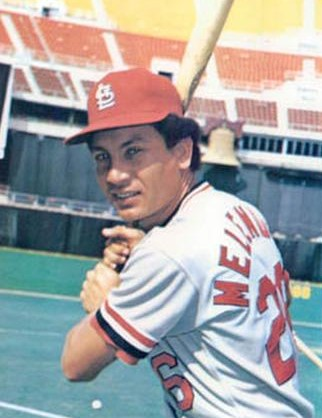
- Outfielder
- Born: August 11, 1949 (age 75); Aibonito, Puerto Rico
- Batted: Right Threw: Right

MLB debut
- September 17, 1970, for the St. Louis Cardinals

Last MLB appearance
- June 1, 1977, for the San Diego Padres

MLB statistics
- Batting average: .248
- Home runs: 9
- Runs batted in: 122
- Stats at Baseball Reference

Teams
- St. Louis Cardinals (1970–1976); San Diego Padres (1976–1977)

Luis Antonio Meléndez Santana (born August 11, 1949) is a Puerto Rican former professional baseball player. He played all or part of eight seasons in Major League Baseball from 1970 until 1977, for the St. Louis Cardinals and San Diego Padres, primarily as an outfielder. He was traded from the Cardinals to the Padres for Bill Greif on May 19, 1976.

Following his playing career, Meléndez was a minor league manager and coach in the Cardinals and Phillies systems, winning the South Atlantic League championship with the Savannah Cardinals in 1994. He has also managed in the Puerto Rico Baseball League. He was most recently a coach for the Gulf Coast Phillies from 2006 to 2009.
