= Dave Roberts (third baseman) =

American baseball player (born 1951)

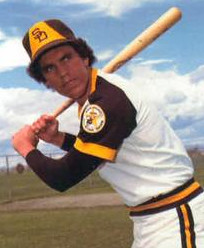
- Roberts in 1978
- Third baseman / Catcher
- Born: February 17, 1951 (age 75); Lebanon, Oregon, U.S.
- Batted: Right Threw: Right

MLB debut
- June 7, 1972, for the San Diego Padres

Last MLB appearance
- September 18, 1982, for the Philadelphia Phillies

MLB statistics
- Batting average: .239
- Home runs: 49
- Runs batted in: 208
- Stats at Baseball Reference

Teams
- San Diego Padres (1972–1975, 1977–1978); Texas Rangers (1979–1980); Houston Astros (1981); Philadelphia Phillies (1982)
Medals
Men's baseball
Representing United States
Amateur World Series
Silver medal – second place	1970 Cartagena	Team

David Wayne Roberts (born February 17, 1951) is an American former professional baseball third baseman and catcher, who played all or part of ten seasons in Major League Baseball (MLB) with the San Diego Padres, Texas Rangers, Houston Astros, and Philadelphia Phillies, between 1972 and 1982.

== San Diego Padres ==
=== 1972: First overall pick ===
Roberts attended Corvallis High School (Oregon) and played college baseball for the University of Oregon, where he was primarily a shortstop. After his junior year, he was made the number one overall pick in the 1972 Major League Baseball draft by the Padres on June 6.

The following day, he signed with the Padres, and later that day made his major league debut, becoming the sixth player to go straight to the majors after being drafted without first playing in the minor leagues. He appeared in the second game of a doubleheader against the Pittsburgh Pirates, entering the game in the 12th inning at third base and going 0-for-3.

Roberts spent most of the remainder of the 1972 season as the Padres' regular third baseman. However, he was shifted to second base in mid-September following the promotion of Dave Hilton from the minors. Overall, he hit .244 with five home runs and 33 runs batted in.

Dave Roberts was playing 3rd base on July 18 when Steve Arlin came within one out of a no-hitter against the Philadelphia Phillies until Denny Doyle bounced a single over Roberts head. Padres Manager Don Zimmer was playing his infield in to guard against the bunt.

=== 1973: First Chance ===
Roberts opened the 1973 season as the Padres' regular second baseman. After five games, in which he went 1-for-16, Roberts was sent to the bench. Over the next 17 games, Roberts played in eight, all as a pinch hitter. On May 1, with Roberts batting .083 and without an extra-base hit, he was demoted to the minor leagues, with Don Mason being recalled.

Playing with the Triple-A Hawaii Islanders, Roberts hit .375 in 22 games. Meanwhile, Hilton, who had started the year at third base, was batting .208. Hilton was returned to the minor leagues and replaced by Roberts, who was the regular third baseman the rest of the season. Roberts responded with what would be the best offensive season of his career, as he posted career highs in batting average (.286), home runs (21) and runs batted in (64) as well as several other categories.

=== 1974: Breakdown ===
Roberts remained the Padres' starter at third base in 1974, but struggled out of the gate. He batted just .194 in April without a homer. It got worse in May, when he batted .163. Although he finally hit his first home run of the year on May 13, he had just seven extra base hits and seven RBI through the first two months. On July 21, batting just .178 in 88 games, Roberts lost his starting job, as he was once again replaced by Dave Hilton. Things did not get any better, as Roberts batted .095 the rest of the way without an RBI to finish the season with a .167 average.

=== 1975: The Ivie experiment ===
In 1975, Roberts found himself starting the year back in the minor leagues in Hawaii. Veteran Glenn Beckert opened the year as the Padres' third baseman, but lasted just three games. Early on, the Padres decided to experiment by putting Mike Ivie—who himself had been the first overall pick by the Padres in the 1970 draft as a catcher—at third base. Although Ivie hit decently, his defense was poor, and he wound up splitting time with Ted Kubiak and Héctor Torres.

Meanwhile, Roberts was having a decent, but not spectacular, season with Hawaii, batting .262 with 12 homers and 71 RBI in 121 games. He was given another shot at the majors in late August, and once again he finished the year as the Padres regular third baseman, batting .283 in 33 games down the stretch.

=== 1976: Back to Hawaii ===
After the 1975 season, the Padres traded two pitchers to the Houston Astros for third baseman Doug Rader, who would be their full-time third baseman in 1976. Rather than keep him in the majors on the bench, the Padres sent Roberts back down to the minors, where—in a reversal of what they did with Ivie—he was converted to catcher. This time, Roberts did not return to the majors. His offensive numbers in Hawaii slipped to a .249 average with 10 home runs and 53 RBI.

=== 1977: Backup catcher ===
Following the 1976 season, the Padres sold Roberts' contract to the expansion Toronto Blue Jays along with those of Dave Hilton and Héctor Torres. However, as the offseason went on, the Padres traded their starting catcher, Fred Kendall to the Cleveland Indians in a deal which brought them slugging outfielder George Hendrick. Owner Ray Kroc, determined to make a big splash, also signed ace reliever Rollie Fingers and catcher-first baseman Gene Tenace as free agents. With the team's bench now a bit thin, the Padres reacquired Roberts from the Blue Jays in exchange for reliever Jerry Johnson.

Roberts' return allowed the Padres to give Tenace more playing time at first base, where Ivie was still considered to be underachieving, without having to give significant playing time to third catcher Bob Davis. Roberts also played several games in the infield. In his first full major league season since 1974, Roberts batted .220 with just one home run in 80 games.

=== 1978: Last chance in San Diego ===
To start the 1978 season, Roberts was once again sent down to the minors. He had lost the job as Tenace's backup to rookie Rick Sweet, and with Davis seemingly entrenched as the third catcher, there was no place for him on the roster. However, things changed at the end of May, as the Padres had decided to move Tenace permanently to first base, bumping Gene Richards back to the outfield. The team sent Davis down to the minors and recalled Roberts, who was hitting .267 in 36 games, to back up Sweet.

Although Roberts played in 54 games, he had just 97 at bats, in which he batted just .216. He continued to expand his defensive flexibility, playing his first major league games in the outfield. However, the Padres finally decided to part ways with their second #1 overall pick, having traded Mike Ivie in February. Roberts was shipped off to the Texas Rangers along with outfielder Oscar Gamble. In return, the Padres acquired utility man and pinch hitter Kurt Bevacqua, first baseman Mike Hargrove, and Roberts' replacement as backup catcher, Bill Fahey.

== Texas Rangers ==
=== 1979 ===
Roberts made the Rangers out of spring training as their third catcher and utilityman. With Jim Sundberg playing 150 games behind the plate and John Ellis also on the team, Roberts played every position on the field except shortstop and pitcher in 1979. Although his batting average finally came back to a respectable .262, he played in just 44 games, and wound up spending some time in Triple-A with the Tucson Toros, playing in nine games for them in August, all at second base.

=== 1980 ===
In 1980, Roberts again served as the Rangers utilityman. This year, however, he saw more time on the field than he had since 1974, playing in 101 games. He played in 37 games at third base, 33 at shortstop, 22 at catcher, five in right field, and four each at first and second base for Texas, batting .238 and reaching double digits in homers (10) for the first time since 1973. After the season, he became a free agent himself for the first time in his career. On December 10, he signed a contract with the Houston Astros.

== Houston Astros ==
Although Roberts spent the entire 1981 season with the Astros, he played sparingly. He appeared in just 27 of the team's 110 games (the season was shortened due to a strike), although he still managed to play four positions. He batted .241 with one home run and five RBI in 54 at bats. The following year, Roberts was traded to the Philadelphia Phillies at the end of spring training for a minor league pitcher.

== Philadelphia Phillies ==
1982 with the Phillies looked a lot like 1981 with the Astros did for Roberts. If anything, he played even less due to a couple of stints on the disabled list. He played in 28 games, with just 6 hits in 33 at bats. He again started the 1983 season on the disabled list, and was released on May 17 without having played that year, ending his playing career.

== After the majors ==
After retiring as a player, Roberts briefly joined the managerial ranks. In 1984, he managed the Eugene Emeralds of the Northwest League, then a farm team of the Kansas City Royals. The team finished 19–55, by far the worst record in the league, and Roberts never managed again. He also served as first base coach for the Indians in 1987.

Roberts was inducted into the Oregon Sports Hall of Fame in 1994.

== See also ==
- List of baseball players who went directly to Major League Baseball
