= Tucker Ashford =

American baseball player (born 1954)

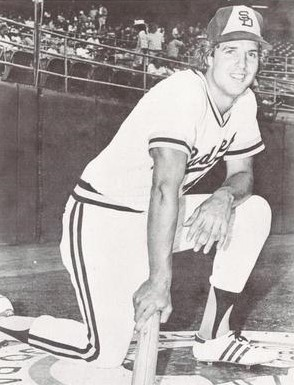
- Third baseman
- Born: December 4, 1954 (age 71); Memphis, Tennessee, U.S.
- Batted: Right Threw: Right

MLB debut
- September 21, 1976, for the San Diego Padres

Last MLB appearance
- May 14, 1984, for the Kansas City Royals

MLB statistics
- Batting average: .218
- Hits: 111
- Home runs: 6
- Stats at Baseball Reference

Teams
- San Diego Padres (1976–1978); Texas Rangers (1980); New York Yankees (1981); New York Mets (1983); Kansas City Royals (1984)

Thomas Steven Ashford (born December 4, 1954) is an American former Major League Baseball third baseman. He was drafted second overall (to Roy Smalley III) in the 1974 January Draft by the San Diego Padres. In addition to the Padres, Ashford also played for the Texas Rangers (1980), New York Yankees (1981), New York Mets (1983) and Kansas City Royals (1984).

== Early years ==
Ashford attended Covington High School in Covington, Tennessee, and was the starting quarterback of the football team his senior year. After a short stint at the University of Mississippi, Ashford transferred to Southwest Tennessee Community College. He played American Legion ball for Post 1 in Memphis, and was the George W. Rulon Player of the Year in 1973.

== San Diego Padres ==
Upon being drafted by the Padres in the 1974 January Draft, Ashford was assigned to the Walla Walla Padres of the Northwest League. Playing primarily shortstop, Ashford batted .243 with four home runs & thirty runs batted in. His transition to third base began the following season with the Texas League's Alexandria Aces. His twelve home runs & 67 RBIs for the Amarillo Gold Sox in 1976 earned him a September call up to the Padres. He went 3-for-5 with a walk, a double & two stolen bases in six plate appearances.

Ashford began the 1977 season in triple A. On June 8, the Padres sold Doug Rader's contract to the Toronto Blue Jays. A week later, Bobby Valentine, his replacement at third base, was traded to the New York Mets. The Padres experimented with Gene Tenace & Dave Kingman (acquired for Valentine) at third before calling Ashford back up at the beginning of July. He collected his first major league RBI in his second start. On July 5, he hit his first major league home run off the Houston Astros' Bo McLaughlin with two outs in the ninth inning to send the game to extra innings. In the twelfth, he singled in the winning run. He won the starting job at third for the remainder of the season, and batted .217 with three home runs & 24 RBIs.

In 1978, new manager Roger Craig awarded the third base job to the Padres' number one overall pick in the 1974 Major League Baseball draft, Bill Almon. Ashford batted .245 with three home runs & a career high 26 RBIs as a back up infielder.

== Rangers & Yankees ==
After spending all of 1979 in triple A, Ashford was traded to the Texas Rangers with Gaylord Perry & minor leaguer Joe Carroll for Willie Montañez. Once again, he spent all of 1980 in triple A with the Charleston Charlies, with the exception of a brief call up to the majors when starting third baseman Buddy Bell sustained an injury.

During the off season, he was traded to the New York Yankees for fellow infielder Roger Holt. Despite batting an even .300 with seventeen HRs and 86 RBIs to beat Greg Wells out for the International League Most Valuable Player Award in 1981, Ashford only saw his way into the late innings of three Yankee games that October, never receiving an at bat.

A poor performance in Spring training took Ashford "out of the picture" for 1982, according to Yankees owner George Steinbrenner. After another season at triple A, he was traded to the crosstown rival Mets for two minor leaguers.

== New York Mets ==
Ashford got off to an exceptional start with the Mets' triple A affiliate, the Tidewater Tides. A .327 batting average through twelve games earned him a call to the majors. His call up to the Mets received much fanfare, as he was called up with 1980 Major League Baseball draft number one overall pick Darryl Strawberry. His first hit as a Met was his only career triple. He also made his only career appearance behind the plate against the Cincinnati Reds on July 13.

Just as the 1984 season was set to begin, he was traded to the Kansas City Royals for pitcher Tom Edens. He earned a spot on the Royals' bench to start the season, but after batting just .154 through nine games, he was sold to the Baltimore Orioles. He finished out the season in triple A for the Orioles, and spent one more season at triple A for the Philadelphia Phillies before retiring.

== Career statistics ==
Games	PA	AB	Runs	Hits	2B	3B	HR	RBI	SB	BB	SO	Avg.	Slg.	Fld%
222	569	510	42	111	31	1	6	55	5	47	75	.218	.318	.949

Ashford married his high school sweetheart, Sherry. They had three children, Jason, Monica & Leslie, who also graduated from Covington High School.
