= Paul Dade =

American baseball player (1951–2016)

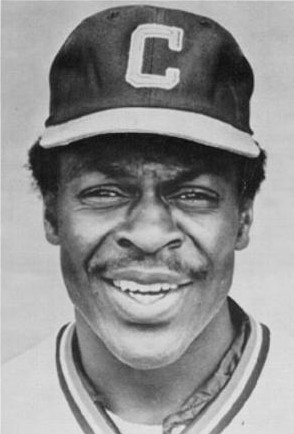
- Outfielder / Third baseman
- Born: December 7, 1951; Seattle, Washington, U.S.
- Died: August 25, 2016 (aged 64); Seattle, Washington, U.S.
- Batted: Right Threw: Right

MLB debut
- September 12, 1975, for the California Angels

Last MLB appearance
- October 5, 1980, for the San Diego Padres

MLB statistics
- Batting average: .270
- Home runs: 10
- Runs batted in: 107
- Stats at Baseball Reference

Teams
- California Angels (1975–1976); Cleveland Indians (1977–1979); San Diego Padres (1979–1980); Hanshin Tigers (1981)

Lonnie Paul Dade (December 7, 1951 – August 25, 2016) was an American Major League Baseball outfielder/third baseman. On June 4, 1970, he was drafted by the California Angels in the 1st round (10th pick) of the 1970 amateur draft. He played for the Angels (1975–1976), Cleveland Indians (1977–1979), and San Diego Padres (1979–1980).

Dade was called up to the Angels after hitting .332 in 100 games for the El Paso Diablos of the Texas League and then .545 in 9 games for the Salt Lake City Gulls of the Pacific Coast League. He made his major league debut on September 12, 1975, at Royals Stadium, starting the second game of a doubleheader in left field against Kansas City. He went 0-for-3 against Al Fitzmorris.

With the Cleveland Indians in 1977, Dade had career-highs for games played (134), games started (111), plate appearances (508), hits (134), batting average (.291), runs batted in (45), and runs (65).

Dade's career totals include 439 games played, a .270 batting average (355-for-1,313), 10 HR, 107 RBI, 186 runs scored, a .328 on-base percentage, and 57 stolen bases.

After his major league career, Dade played one season in Japan for the Hanshin Tigers in 1981.

Dade died of lung cancer on August 25, 2016.
