= Mike Dupree (baseball) =

American baseball player (born 1953)

- Pitcher
- Born: May 29, 1953 (age 72); Kansas City, Kansas, U.S.
- Batted: Right Threw: Right

Professional debut
- MLB: April 13, 1976, for the San Diego Padres
- NPB: April 5, 1980, for the Hiroshima Toyo Carp

Last appearance
- MLB: May 19, 1976, for the San Diego Padres
- NPB: November 2, 1980, for the Hiroshima Toyo Carp

MLB statistics
- Win–loss record: 0–0
- Earned run average: 9.19
- Strikeouts: 5

NPB statistics
- Batting average: .266
- Home runs: 10
- Runs batted in: 40
- Stats at Baseball Reference

Teams
- San Diego Padres (1976); Hiroshima Toyo Carp (1980)

Michael Dennis Dupree (born May 29, 1953) is former Major League Baseball pitcher. Dupree played for the San Diego Padres in 1976.

Dupree pitched and played the outfield at Fresno City College. Nonetheless, the Padres selected him in the 1973 Major League Baseball draft with the intention of having him play the infield.

He batted and threw right-handed. He also played a season in Japan for the Hiroshima Toyo Carp as an outfielder in 1980.

A single in his only at-bat left Dupree with a rare MLB career batting average of 1.000.
