= Rick Sawyer =

American baseball player (born 1948)

- Pitcher
- Born: April 7, 1948 (age 77); Bakersfield, California, U.S.
- Batted: Right Threw: Right

MLB debut
- April 28, 1974, for the New York Yankees

Last MLB appearance
- September 23, 1977, for the San Diego Padres

MLB statistics
- Win–loss record: 12–9
- Earned run average: 4.49
- Strikeouts: 82
- Stats at Baseball Reference

Teams
- New York Yankees (1974–1975); San Diego Padres (1976–1977)

Richard Clyde Sawyer (born April 7, 1948 in Bakersfield, California) is a former pitcher in Major League Baseball who played from 1974 through 1977 for the New York Yankees and San Diego Padres.
