= Brian Greer =

American baseball player (born 1959)

- Centerfielder
- Born: May 14, 1959 (age 67); Lynwood, California, U.S.
- Batted: Right Threw: Right

MLB debut
- September 13, 1977, for the San Diego Padres

Last MLB appearance
- September 20, 1979, for the San Diego Padres

MLB statistics
- Games played: 5
- At bats: 4
- Hits: 0
- Stats at Baseball Reference

Teams
- San Diego Padres (1977, 1979)

Brian Keith Greer (born May 14, 1959) is an American former Major League Baseball player.

Greer was drafted eighth overall in the 1977 draft. He appeared in five games with the San Diego Padres in 1977 and 1979. He was the youngest player in the National League in 1977.
