= John D'Acquisto =

American baseball player (born 1951)

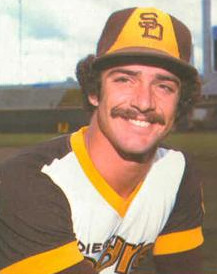
- D'Acquisto in 1978
- Pitcher
- Born: December 24, 1951 (age 74); San Diego, California, U.S.
- Batted: Right Threw: Right

MLB debut
- September 2, 1973, for the San Francisco Giants

Last MLB appearance
- October 1, 1982, for the Oakland Athletics

MLB statistics
- Win–loss record: 34–51
- Earned run average: 4.56
- Strikeouts: 600
- Stats at Baseball Reference

Teams
- San Francisco Giants (1973–1976); St. Louis Cardinals (1977); San Diego Padres (1977–1980); Montreal Expos (1980); California Angels (1981); Oakland Athletics (1982)

John Francis D'Acquisto (born December 24, 1951) is an American former professional baseball pitcher who played ten seasons in Major League Baseball (MLB). He is the cousin of former major league pitcher Lou Marone.

== Career ==
=== San Francisco Giants ===
D'Acquisto was drafted by the San Francisco Giants in the first round of the 1970 MLB draft out of St. Augustine High School in San Diego, California. He made his Major League debut on September 2, 1973, against the Atlanta Braves, starting the second game of a doubleheader. D'Acquisto allowed two runs in 4.2 innings and did not get the decision. He pitched a complete game victory over the San Diego Padres on September 21 for his first career win while striking out 11. Overall, D'Acquisto was 1–1 with a 3.58 ERA in seven appearances (three starts) that year.

D'Acquisto was named National League (NL) Rookie Pitcher of the Year in 1974 when he went 12–14 with a 3.77 ERA for the fifth-place Giants, but he missed most of the next season after elbow surgery. He tied an NL record with three wild pitches in one inning on September 24, 1976.

In four seasons with the Giants, D'Acquisto compiled a record of 18–27 with a 4.68 ERA in 83 appearances (64 starts).

=== St. Louis Cardinals ===
D'Acquisto was traded (with Mike Caldwell and Dave Rader) to the St. Louis Cardinals for Willie Crawford, John Curtis and Vic Harris on October 20, 1976. Due to his being on the disabled list, D'Acquisto only appeared in three games with the Cardinals, with a 4.32 ERA.

=== San Diego Padres ===
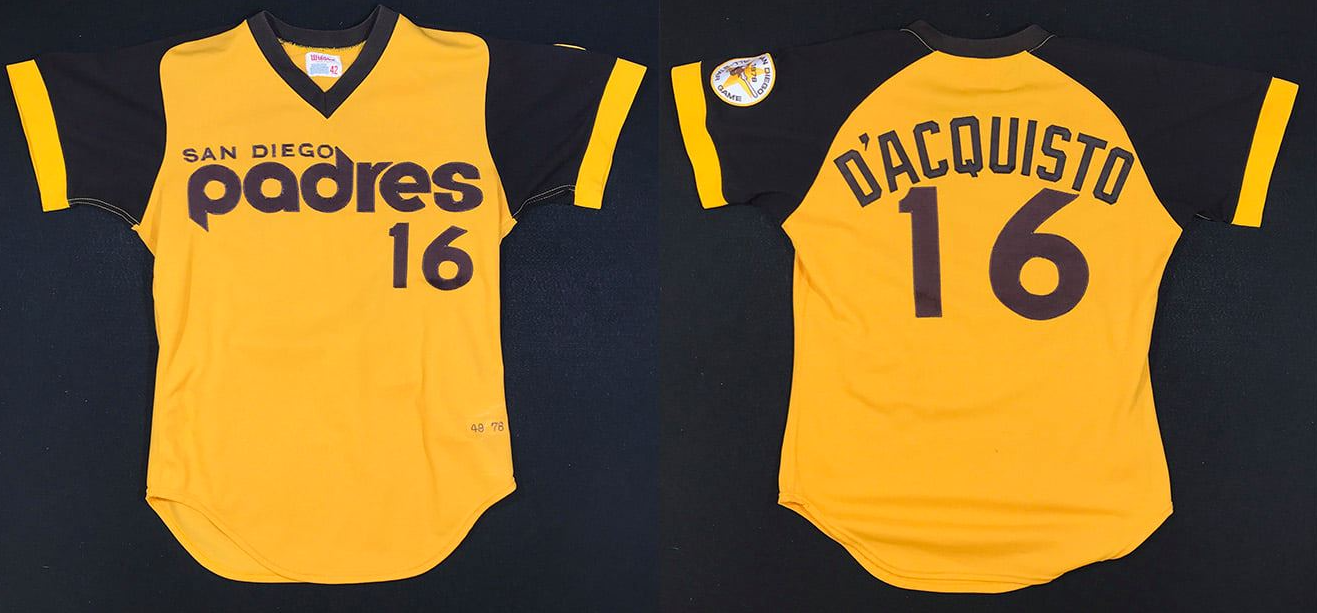
San Diego Padres 1978 #16 John D'Acquisto alternate jersey

D'Acquisto was traded, along with Pat Scanlon, from the Cardinals to the San Diego Padres for Butch Metzger on May 17, 1977. In 1978, he was switched to the bullpen (4–3, 10 saves, 2.13 ERA in 45 appearances). In 1979, D'Acquisto was put back into the rotation and had 51 appearances, with a 9–13 record with 134 innings pitched and struck out 97 batters.

In four seasons with the Padres, D'Acquisto went 16–21 with a 4.24 ERA in 152 games (26 starts).

=== Montreal Expos ===
On August 11, 1980, D'Acquisto was traded to the Montreal Expos for a player to be named later (Randy Bass). He made 11 appearances out of the bullpen with the Expos, with a 2.18 ERA.

=== California Angels ===
In 1981 D'Acquisto tested the free agent market and signed with the California Angels. D'Acquisto did not pitch much with the Angels (6 appearances) during the strike-ridden year and was subsequently sent to the minor leagues in Salt Lake City, Utah. He was brought back to the parent team in spring training and then released.

=== Atlanta Braves ===
After his release, D'Acquisto signed with the Atlanta Braves and was sent to Richmond AAA International League in 1982. He asked for, and was granted, his release on July 27, 1982.

=== Oakland Athletics ===
He signed with the Oakland Athletics under Billy Martin and pitched for Oakland for the rest of the 1982 season. D'Acquisto was part of the A's in spring training the next year also but was released on the last day of spring training.

=== Chicago White Sox ===
D'Acquisto was picked up by the Chicago White Sox and sent to Denver of the American Association.

D'Acquisto retired after arm surgery in 1983. In 1989, D'Acquisto pitched for the Bradenton Explorers and St. Lucie Legends of the Senior Professional Baseball Association, where he finished 5–4 with four saves.

== Post-playing career ==
After he retired from baseball, D'Acquisto became a registered investment advisor. In 1996, D'Acquisto was sentenced to five years and three months in prison for trying to pass off a forged $200 million certificate of deposit. D'Acquisto was also indicted in 1998 on charges of defrauding investors of approximately $7 million. As a result, D'Acquisto was sentenced the following year to an additional four years and seven months in prison after he pleaded guilty to wire fraud and money laundering, which was served concurrently with the term handed down in 1996.
