= Mike Ivie =

American baseball player (1952–2023)

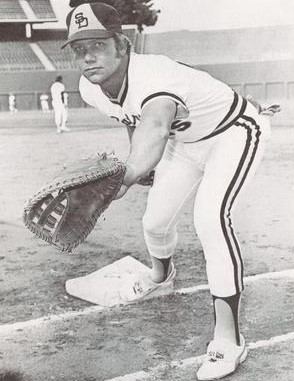
- Ivie in 1977
- First baseman
- Born: August 8, 1952; Atlanta, Georgia, U.S.
- Died: July 21, 2023 (aged 70); North Augusta, South Carolina, U.S.
- Batted: Right Threw: Right

MLB debut
- September 4, 1971, for the San Diego Padres

Last MLB appearance
- May 7, 1983, for the Detroit Tigers

MLB statistics
- Batting average: .269
- Home runs: 81
- Runs batted in: 411
- Stats at Baseball Reference

Teams
- San Diego Padres (1971, 1974–1977); San Francisco Giants (1978–1981); Houston Astros (1981–1982); Detroit Tigers (1982–1983)

Michael Wilson Ivie (August 8, 1952 – July 21, 2023) was an American professional baseball player. He played as a first baseman in Major League Baseball for the San Diego Padres, San Francisco Giants, Houston Astros, and Detroit Tigers during his career from 1971 to 1983. The Padres chose Ivie with the first overall selection of the 1970 MLB draft.

== Baseball career ==
Ivie was born August 8, 1952, in Atlanta, Georgia, and attended Walker High School in Atlanta. Playing for the school's baseball team, he at one point hit 21 home runs in 21 games.

The San Diego Padres selected Ivie with the first overall pick in the 1970 Major League Baseball draft as a catcher. He signed with the Padres, receiving a $100,000 signing bonus, and began his career in the Padres' minor league system. During his first minor league season, Ivie developed the yips, having trouble throwing the ball back to the pitcher. He insisted that he was finished with catching.

He made his major league debut as an 18-year-old in September 1971. Ivie developed a problem with his blood circulation in his left hand, which cemented his decision to stop catching.

In 1972, he left the Padres during spring training and returned home to Georgia. His father cited the pressure Ivie put on himself as the reason for his departure. After taking a month off and considering quitting baseball altogether, Ivie returned to the organization and was assigned to the Padres AA team in Alexandria, Louisiana.

In 1973, Ivie was assigned to the Padres AAA Team in Honolulu. He played for just over two months, before abruptly quitting baseball again in mid-June claiming he was sick of traveling.

He came back to the Padres in the spring of 1974. After spending the bulk of the season with Alexandria, Ivie returned to the major leagues with the Padres in September as a first baseman.

During the 1978 offseason, the Padres traded Ivie to the San Francisco Giants in exchange for Derrel Thomas. Going into the 1980 season, Ivie was considered the Giants' successor at first base to Willie McCovey upon his retirement, but after an off-season accident with a hunting knife in which he sliced part of his fifth finger from his hand, he was unable to perform and became a bench player. He walked away from the team in June, but received counseling and returned in July. He played out the 1980 season, hitting four home runs. In 1981, Ivie lost the starting first base job to free agent Enos Cabell, acquired during the offseason. The Giants traded Ivie to the Houston Astros for Dave Bergman and Jeffrey Leonard on April 20, 1981. He asked for his release from the Astros during the 1982 season, which was granted.

Ivie then called on Sparky Anderson, manager of the Detroit Tigers, and he was signed to play first base and designated hitter. During the 1982 season, he hit 14 home runs. Ivie began the 1983 season as Detroit's starting first baseman, but was released by the Tigers in May. Ivie sought to make a comeback and attended a tryout in September 1984 with the Atlanta Braves; they offered him a non-roster invitation to spring training with the team in 1985. After the Braves would not guarantee him a roster spot, he opted not to attend.

== Personal life ==
After his release from the Tigers, Ivie opened a pro shop for hunting and fishing in Snellville, Georgia. Ivie and his first wife had two sons. They divorced and Ivie remarried.

Ivie died in North Augusta, South Carolina, on July 21, 2023, at age 70. Ivie's death marked the first death of a first-overall MLB draft pick.
