= Bob Fontaine Sr. =

American baseball player, scout, and executive (1923-1994)

- Born: November 14, 1923; San Jose, California, U.S.
- Died: March 25, 1994 (aged 70); Poway, California, U.S.
- Occupations: Baseball player, scout and executive
- Years active: 1941–1992

Robert Marcel Fontaine (November 14, 1923 – March 25, 1994) was an American professional baseball player, scout and executive. The native of San Jose, California, a World War II veteran, was the first director of scouting for the San Diego Padres of the National League, and served as the third general manager in the history of San Diego's Major League franchise.

As a minor league baseball pitcher, Fontaine went 26–18 in five seasons (1941–42; 1946–48) in the Brooklyn Dodgers' farm system. He missed 1943–45 due to service in the United States Army Air Forces.

Following his playing days, Fontaine was a scout for Branch Rickey's Dodgers and moved to the Pittsburgh Pirates with Rickey in 1951, serving as a Pirates' scout for 18 seasons. He spent eight years (1969–76) as the expansion Padres' first director of amateur scouting, and added the responsibilities of director of player development in 1973. Then, upon the departure of Peter Bavasi for the presidency of the Toronto Blue Jays in June 1976, Fontaine was promoted to general manager. He served in that role for four seasons, through July 7, 1980. The Padres went 295–372 (.442) with one winning season (1978), the first in franchise history, during his tenure.

Fontaine then served as the San Francisco Giants' scouting director until 1992. He died from pneumonia in Poway, California, in 1994 at age 70.

His son Bob Fontaine Jr. also worked in baseball as a scouting director, and his grandson, Matthew Thomas, was drafted by the Seattle Mariners in 2007.

Preceded by Peter Bavasi	San Diego Padres General Manager; 1976–1980	Succeeded by Jack McKeon
