= Broderick Perkins =

American baseball player (born 1954)

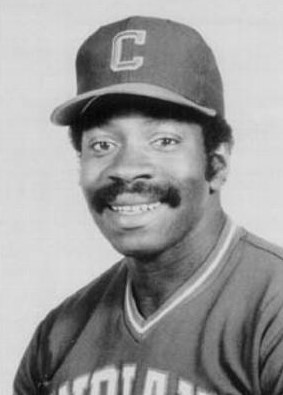
- First baseman
- Born: November 23, 1954 (age 71); Pittsburg, California, U.S.
- Batted: Left Threw: Left

MLB debut
- July 7, 1978, for the San Diego Padres

Last MLB appearance
- September 23, 1984, for the Cleveland Indians

MLB statistics
- Batting average: .271
- Home runs: 8
- Runs batted in: 157
- Stats at Baseball Reference

Teams
- San Diego Padres (1978–1982); Cleveland Indians (1983–1984)

Broderick Phillip Perkins (born November 23, 1954) is an American former professional baseball player. He played all or parts of seven seasons in Major League Baseball, from 1978 until 1984, for the San Diego Padres and Cleveland Indians, primarily as a first baseman. His only season as a full-time player was 1982, when he played in 125 games for the Padres, batting .271.

Born in Pittsburg, CA, Perkins was selected by the San Diego Padres in the 15th round of the 1976 draft, making his major league debut for them on July 7, 1978. He played five seasons for the Padres, becoming their starting first baseman in 1982, appearing in 125 games.

In 1982 he was traded by the Padres along with Juan Eichelberger to the Cleveland Indians for Ed Whitson. He played the 1983 and 1984 seasons for the Indians, splitting his time in the outfield and first base. His final major league game was on September 23, 1984 as the Indians released him on October 15, 1984.

== Sources ==
- Career statistics from Baseball Reference · Baseball Reference (Minors) · Retrosheet · Baseball Almanac
