= Glenn Ezell =

American baseball player (1944–2020)

Glenn Wayne Ezell (October 29, 1944 – November 9, 2020) was an American front-office executive in Major League Baseball, as well as an MLB coach and minor league catcher and manager. He threw and batted right-handed, stood 6 feet, 1 inch (1.85 m) tall and weighed 185 pounds (84 kg). Ezell batted .268 with 23 home runs in 661 minor league games.

Ezell was born in Kentwood, Louisiana, and began his professional career as a catcher in the New York Mets, Minnesota Twins, San Francisco Giants and San Diego Padres organizations (1966–74; 1977). He worked for 12 seasons as a coach in the Major Leagues, with the Texas Rangers (1983–85), Kansas City Royals (1989–94), Detroit Tigers (1996), and Tampa Bay Devil Rays (2001–02). He managed in the farm systems of the Pittsburgh Pirates, Padres, Toronto Blue Jays, Oakland Athletics, Royals and Tigers for all or parts of 13 seasons between 1975 and 2000.

In the late 1990s, Ezell was a roving catching instructor in the Detroit farm system. After his stint as an MLB coach with the Devil Rays, he rejoined the Tigers as field coordinator of instruction in 2003 and was promoted to player development director in 2006. On June 8, 2010, the Tigers announced that Ezell had stepped down from that position, although Ezell indicated that he was asked to resign.

Ezell died in November 2020.
