= 1970 Major League Baseball draft =

Baseball draft of amateur players

Overview
- First selection: Mike Ivie; San Diego Padres
- First round selections: 24
- Hall of Famers: 3: P Goose Gossage; OF Dave Parker; P Bruce Sutter

The 1970 Major League Baseball draft took place prior to the 1970 MLB season. The draft saw the San Diego Padres select Mike Ivie first overall.

== First round selections ==
= All-Star	= Baseball Hall of Famer

The following are the first round picks in the 1970 Major League Baseball draft.

Pick	Player	Team	Position	Hometown/School
1	Mike Ivie	San Diego Padres	Catcher	Decatur, Georgia
2	Steve Dunning	Cleveland Indians	RHP	Stanford University
3	Barry Foote	Montreal Expos	Catcher	Smithfield, North Carolina
4	Darrell Porter	Milwaukee Brewers	Catcher	Oklahoma City, Oklahoma
5	Mike Martin	Philadelphia Phillies	LHP	Columbia, South Carolina
6	Bucky Dent	Chicago White Sox	Third Baseman	Miami-Hialeah/Miami-Dade Community College
7	* Randy Scarbery	Houston Astros	RHP	Fresno, California
8	Rex Goodson	Kansas City Royals	RHP	Longview, Texas
9	Jim Haller	Los Angeles Dodgers	RHP	Omaha, Nebraska
10	Paul Dade	Los Angeles Angels	Third Baseman/Outfielder	Seattle
11	Bobby Browning	St. Louis Cardinals	RHP	Gadsden, Alabama
12	Dave Cheadle	New York Yankees	LHP	Asheville, North Carolina
13	John Bedard	Pittsburgh Pirates	RHP	Springfield, Massachusetts
14	Charles Maxwell	Washington Senators	Third Baseman/Shortstop	Kingston, Ohio
15	Gary Polczynski	Cincinnati Reds	Shortstop	West Allis, Wisconsin
16	* Jimmy Hacker	Boston Red Sox	Shortstop	Temple, Texas
17	John D'Acquisto	San Francisco Giants	RHP	San Diego, California
18	Dan Ford	Oakland Athletics	Outfielder	Los Angeles
19	Gene Hiser	Chicago Cubs	Outfielder	University of Maryland
20	Terry Mappin	Detroit Tigers	Catcher	Louisville, Kentucky
21	Ron Broaddus	Atlanta Braves	RHP	Freeport, Texas
22	Bob Gorinski	Minnesota Twins	Shortstop	Calumet, Pennsylvania
23	* George Ambrow	New York Mets	Shortstop	Long Beach, California
24	James West	Baltimore Orioles	Catcher	St. Louis, Missouri

* Did not sign

== Other notable selections ==
= All-Star	= Baseball Hall of Famer

Round	Pick	Player	Team	Position
2	30	Terry Forster	Chicago White Sox	Pitcher
2	41	Butch Metzger	San Francisco Giants	Pitcher
3	60	Fred Lynn*	New York Yankees	Outfielder
3	67	Rick Reuschel	Chicago Cubs	Pitcher
5	110	Rick Waits	Washington Senators	Pitcher
6	124	Bill Travers	Milwaukee Brewers	Pitcher
8	171	Phil Garner*	Montreal Expos	Infielder
9	198	Goose Gossage	Chicago White Sox	Pitcher
10	231	Ray Knight	Cincinnati Reds	Pitcher/Third Baseman
14	325	Dave Parker	Pittsburgh Pirates	Catcher/Outfielder
19	446	Jerry Remy*	Washington Senators	Second Baseman
19	447	Pat Zachry	Cincinnati Reds	Pitcher
20	479	Bruce Boisclair	New York Mets	Outfielder
21	494	Bruce Sutter*	Washington Senators	Pitcher
23	541	Ed Ott	Pittsburgh Pirates	Third Baseman/Catcher
29	671	John Denny	St. Louis Cardinals	Pitcher
30	692	Doc Medich	New York Yankees	Pitcher
31	712	James Street*	Cleveland Indians	Pitcher
32	725	Mike Krukow*	California Angels	Pitcher/Catcher
35	770	Roy Smalley*	Montreal Expos	Shortstop
37	802	Bake McBride	St. Louis Cardinals	Pitcher/Outfielder

* Did not sign

Preceded by Jeff Burroughs	1st Overall Picks; Mike Ivie	Succeeded by Danny Goodwin
