= Bob Owchinko =

American baseball player (born 1955)

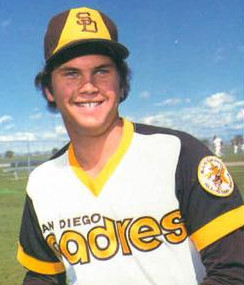
- Owchinko in 1978
- Pitcher
- Born: January 1, 1955 (age 71); Detroit, Michigan, U.S.
- Batted: Left Threw: Left

MLB debut
- September 25, 1976, for the San Diego Padres

Last MLB appearance
- October 1, 1986, for the Montreal Expos

MLB statistics
- Win–loss record: 37–60
- Earned run average: 4.28
- Strikeouts: 490
- Stats at Baseball Reference

Teams
- San Diego Padres (1976–1979); Cleveland Indians (1980); Oakland Athletics (1981–1982); Pittsburgh Pirates (1983); Cincinnati Reds (1984); Montreal Expos (1986)
Medals
Men's baseball
Representing United States
Pan American Games
Silver medal – second place	1975 Mexico City	Team

Robert Dennis Owchinko (born January 1, 1955) is an American former professional baseball left-handed pitcher who played all or parts of ten seasons in Major League Baseball (MLB). Initially drafted by the San Diego Padres, he played for five teams during the 1980s. During his career, he worked as both a starter and relief pitcher.

== Amateur career ==
Owchinko pitched for Frank Cody High School and Eastern Michigan University. He helped lead EMU to two straight NCAA College World Series appearances, with a fifth-place finish in 1975 and second place finish in 1976. He was voted Eastern Michigan's Most Valuable Pitcher in 1975 with an 11-1 record. After the season, Owchinko helped lead the U.S. Men's National Team to a silver medal in the 1975 Pan American Games.

In 1976 he went 14-3 to earn Most Valuable Pitcher honors a second year in a row, and was named to the second-team All-America and first-team Academic All-America. Over his college career, he went 29–9 with a 2.15 earned run average and a school record 309 strikeouts in 305 innings pitched. He earned four varsity letters in his time at EMU.

== San Diego Padres ==
Owchinko was picked in the first round (fifth overall) by Peter Bavasi for the San Diego Padres in the 1976 Major League Baseball draft. After going 6-2 with a 3.26 ERA for the double A Texas League Amarillo Gold Sox, Owchinko was called up to the majors in his very first professional season. He made his major league debut on September 25 against the Atlanta Braves at Atlanta–Fulton County Stadium. After escaping the first inning unscathed, he surrendered four earned runs in .2 of an inning in the second before being pulled. In his second start against the Los Angeles Dodgers, Owchinko lasted 2.2 innings, and gave up four earned runs. In two starts, Owchinko went 0-2 with a 16.62 ERA as a major leaguer in 1976.

He began the 1977 season with the triple A Hawaii Islanders, but after going 5-1 with a 1.43 ERA through his first six starts, he was called up the majors in May. His first major league win came in relief on June 7 against the St. Louis Cardinals. He would also earn his first career shutout against the Cardinals later in the season. All told, Owchinko went 9-12 with a 4.45 ERA with a career best 101 strikeouts his rookie season, and was named National League Rookie Pitcher of the Year.

In 1978, Owchinko went 10-13 with a 3.56 ERA in 202.1 innings pitched, all career highs. He was used more out of the bullpen in 1979, appearing in a career-high 42 games. He went 4-7 as a starter, and 2-5 in relief despite having a much better ERA in relief (2.19) than as a starter (4.25).

== Cleveland Indians ==
After the season, Owchinko and outfielder Jim Wilhelm were traded to the Cleveland Indians for Jerry Mumphrey. He began the season as a starter, but after going 0-4 with a 6.52 ERA through his first five starts, he was moved to the bullpen, making the occasional spot start. Injuries depleted Cleveland's starting rotation, giving Owchinko a second shot at starting. He responded with a four hit shutout of the Detroit Tigers, however, would lose his next three starts to finish the season with a 2-9 record and 5.27 ERA. After just one season in Cleveland, he was included in a six-player trade to the Pittsburgh Pirates for Bert Blyleven and Manny Sanguillén. Just as the 1981 season was set to begin, the Pirates flipped him to the Oakland Athletics for a player to be named later & cash.

== Oakland A's ==
Owchinko was used exclusively out of the bullpen by A's manager Billy Martin. He earned his first career save on May 2 against the New York Yankees, and was 3-1 with a 1.13 ERA with two saves in the first half of the strike shortened 1981 season to help the A's capture the American League East first half crown. He made his only post season appearance that year, pitching 1.2 innings and allowing one earned run in the 1981 American League Championship Series against the Yankees.

Owchinko led the A's in relief appearances in 1982, going 2-4 with a 5.21 ERA and three saves in 54 games.

== Career twilight ==
The A's released Owchinko just as the 1983 season was set to start. He signed with the Pirates in May, and made one appearance with the club against the Cardinals. The first batter he faced, Andy Van Slyke, clubbed a home run. Owchinko was pulled without recording an out after the second batter, Darrell Porter, doubled to right field.

He pitched to a respectable 3-5 record and 4.12 ERA in 49 appearances for the Cincinnati Reds in 1984. After that, he became something of a minor league journeyman, pitching in the A's, Chicago White Sox and Montreal Expos organizations. He made three starts with the Expos toward the end of the 1986 season, winning one, before retiring.

== Career stats ==
Category	W	L	PCT	ERA	G	GS	CG	SHO	SV	IP	H	R	ER	HR	BB	SO	WP	HBP	Fld%	Avg.	RBI	SH
Total	37	60	.381	4.28	275	104	10	4	7	890.2	937	461	424	88	363	490	25	6	.973	.135	5	26

He was inducted into Eastern Michigan Athletic Hall of Fame in 1989, and the Mid-American Conference Hall of Fame in 1992.

== Personal life ==
After retiring, Owchinko transitioned into a career in business. He gives back to his alma mater through the Bob Owchinko Baseball Technology Endowment and the Bob Owchinko Baseball Technology Expendable Funds.
