= Dave Wehrmeister =

American baseball player (1952–2023)

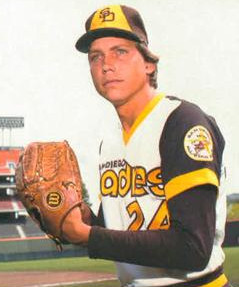
- Wehrmeister in 1978
- Pitcher
- Born: November 9, 1952; Berwyn, Illinois, U.S.
- Died: December 6, 2023 (aged 71); Walnut Creek, California, U.S.
- Batted: Right Threw: Right

MLB debut
- April 16, 1976, for the San Diego Padres

Last MLB appearance
- October 4, 1985, for the Chicago White Sox

MLB statistics
- Win–loss record: 4–9
- Earned run average: 5.65
- Strikeouts: 96
- Stats at Baseball Reference

Teams
- San Diego Padres (1976–1978); New York Yankees (1981); Philadelphia Phillies (1984); Chicago White Sox (1985)

David Thomas Wehrmeister (November 9, 1952 – December 6, 2023) was an American Major League Baseball pitcher. Wehrmeister pitched parts of six seasons in the majors from 1976 to 1985, never pitching in more than 30 games.

Wehrmeister attended Lyons Township High School where he was a varsity Letter winner in baseball. He was the San Diego Padres' first-round pick, and third overall, in the January regular phase of the 1973 Major League Baseball draft. He made his major league debut with the Padres in 1976, and split the next three seasons between the Padres and their minor league system.

In June of 1979, Wehrmeister was traded to the New York Yankees for outfielder Jay Johnstone, but did not play for the Yankees until 1981, when he appeared in four games in relief.

In June of 1983, the Yankees sent Wehrmeister to the Philadelphia Phillies in a minor league deal. In 1984, Wehrmeister got another brief chance at the majors, this time appearing in seven games in June and July before returning to the minors.

Wehrmeister became a free agent at the end of the season, and in January 1985 he signed with the Chicago White Sox, for whom he had his best season statistically, recording his only ERA below 5.00 at 3.43, earning two of his four major league wins, and his only two major league saves. He pitched one more season for the minor league Buffalo Bisons in 1986 before retiring.

Wehrmeister died in Walnut Creek, California, on December 6, 2023, at the age of 71.
