= Jerry Turner (baseball) =

American baseball player (1954–2023)

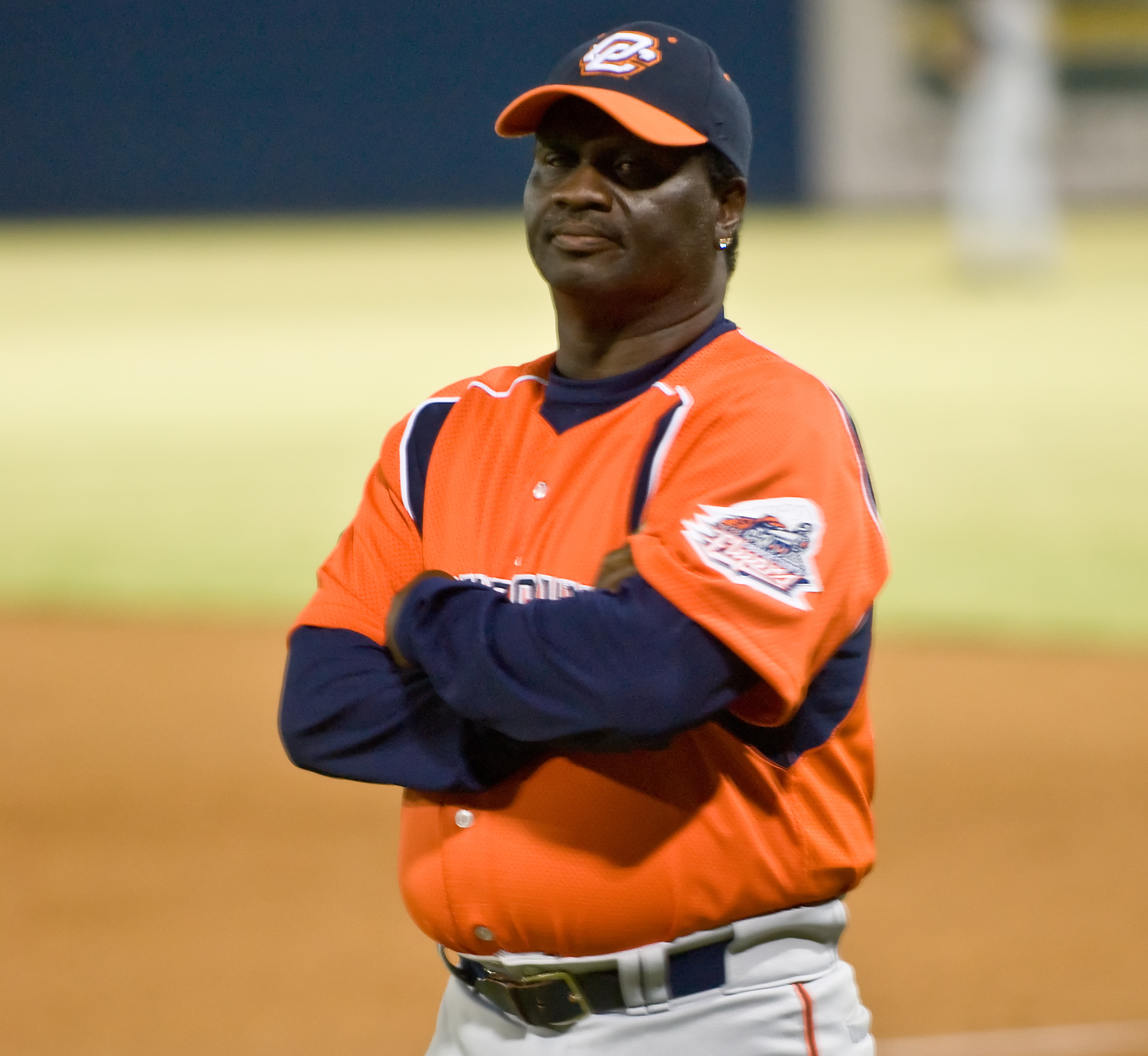
- Turner with the Orange County Flyers in 2007
- Outfielder
- Born: January 17, 1954; Texarkana, Arkansas, U.S.
- Died: August 20, 2023 (aged 69); Lancaster, California, U.S.
- Batted: Left Threw: Left

MLB debut
- September 2, 1974, for the San Diego Padres

Last MLB appearance
- June 17, 1983, for the San Diego Padres

MLB statistics
- Batting average: .257
- Home runs: 45
- Runs batted in: 238
- Stats at Baseball Reference

Teams
- San Diego Padres (1974–1981); Chicago White Sox (1981); Detroit Tigers (1982); San Diego Padres (1983)

John Webber "Jerry" Turner (January 17, 1954 – August 20, 2023) was an American professional baseball player, an outfielder who played in seven full seasons and parts of three others in the Major Leagues from 1974–1983, mostly with the San Diego Padres (1974–1981; 1983). Turner threw and batted left-handed, stood 5 feet 9 inches (175 cm) tall and weighed 180 pounds (82 kg).

== Biography ==
Turner was born on January 17, 1954, in Texarkana, Arkansas. He grew up in Los Angeles, attended Venice High School, and was selected by the Padres with their tenth pick in the 1972 Major League Baseball draft.

Turner was first called to the Majors in September 1974 after he batted .326 with 18 home runs, 68 runs batted in and 154 hits for the Double-A Alexandria Aces. The following season, he had another late season trial after batting .329 with 91 RBI for the Triple-A Hawaii Islanders. He then spent the next seven full seasons in the Majors, and was the Padres' regular left fielder in 1976 and 1979. Turner also played ten games for the Chicago White Sox in 1981 and 85 games for the Detroit Tigers in 1982.

In 733 MLB games, Turner had a .257 batting average with 448 hits, 222 runs, 238 RBIs, 73 doubles, nine triples, and 45 home runs.

Jerry Turner died in Lancaster, California on August 20, 2023, at the age of 69.
