= Roger Craig (baseball) =

American baseball player (1930–2023)

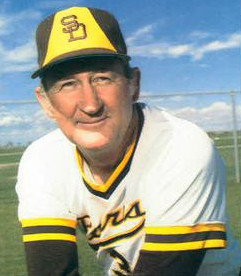
- Craig as San Diego Padres' manager in 1978
- Pitcher / Manager
- Born: February 17, 1930; Durham, North Carolina, U.S.
- Died: June 4, 2023 (aged 93); San Diego, California, U.S.
- Batted: Right Threw: Right

MLB debut
- July 17, 1955, for the Brooklyn Dodgers

Last MLB appearance
- July 10, 1966, for the Philadelphia Phillies

MLB statistics
- Win–loss record: 74–98
- Earned run average: 3.83
- Strikeouts: 803
- Managerial record: 738–737
- Winning %: .500
- Stats at Baseball Reference
- Managerial record at Baseball Reference

Teams
- As player: Brooklyn / Los Angeles Dodgers (1955–1961); New York Mets (1962–1963); St. Louis Cardinals (1964); Cincinnati Reds (1965); Philadelphia Phillies (1966); As manager: San Diego Padres (1978–1979); San Francisco Giants (1985–1992); As coach: San Diego Padres (1969–1972); Houston Astros (1974–1975); San Diego Padres (1976–1977); Detroit Tigers (1980–1984)

Career highlights and awards
- 4× World Series champion (1955, 1959, 1964, 1984)

Roger Lee Craig (February 17, 1930 – June 4, 2023) was an American professional baseball pitcher, coach and manager in Major League Baseball (MLB). After playing for the Brooklyn / Los Angeles Dodgers, New York Mets, St. Louis Cardinals, Cincinnati Reds and Philadelphia Phillies between 1955 and 1966, Craig became an acclaimed pitching coach, and a manager, between 1969 and 1992.

As a player and coach, Craig was part of four World Series championship teams. As a manager, he led the 1989 San Francisco Giants to the team's first National League championship in 27 years.

== Playing career ==
Craig was born in Durham, North Carolina, and graduated from Durham High School, where he played multiple sports. He began his college sports career at North Carolina State University on a basketball scholarship, but spent only one year at NC State before signing a professional baseball contract with the Brooklyn Dodgers in 1950 for $6,000 (equivalent to $80,000 in 2025).

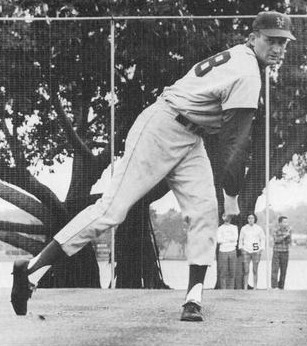
Craig as a Met (1963)

Craig threw and batted right-handed, stood 6 feet 4 inches (1.93 m) tall and weighed 190 pounds (86 kg). After his first two seasons in the Dodger farm system, he missed 1952 and 1953 while performing Korean War military service. In 1955, he won ten of 12 decisions for the Triple-A Montreal Royals, then was called up to the majors in midyear. In his debut game July 17, Craig was the Dodgers' starting pitcher against the Cincinnati Redlegs at Ebbets Field. He threw a complete game victory and allowed only three hits and one earned run as Brooklyn triumphed, 6–2.

He made nine more starts for the Dodgers over the next ten weeks, and relieved in a dozen games more; he threw two more complete games, earned two saves, and posted a fine 2.78 earned run average as the Dodgers won the National League pennant. He started Game 5 of the 1955 World Series against the New York Yankees, worked six innings, gave up four hits and only two runs before being relieved by Clem Labine, and was credited with Brooklyn's 5–3 victory. Two days later, on October 4, 1955, Craig's teammate Johnny Podres shut out the Yanks in Game 7, giving Brooklyn its first and only World Series championship.

Craig would appear in three more World Series. He was treated harshly by the Yankees and Chicago White Sox in the 1956 and 1959 World Series, losing two decisions with a dismal 9.98 earned run average; but he was almost flawless as a reliever for the St. Louis Cardinals in the 1964 Series. In two appearances for the Redbirds, he kept the Yankees scoreless and allowed only two hits in five innings pitched. A yeoman effort in Game 4, in which Craig worked 4 2/3 scoreless innings pitched (with eight strikeouts) in relief of Ray Sadecki, enabled the Cardinals to recover from a 3–0 deficit to win, 4–3, with Craig getting credit for the victory. St. Louis went on to take the series in seven games.

Craig was a member of the inaugural 1962 New York Mets. As a member of the starting rotation of the 1962 and 1963 Mets, who lost 120 and 111 games, respectively, Craig posted a 15–46 won–lost record during his two seasons with the expansion team. "But," Craig once recalled, "11 of those times it took a shutout to beat me." Despite his poor record, Craig was a stalwart of the legendarily bad team's pitching staff. Remarkably, he threw 27 complete games in 64 starts, demonstrating that he was one of the Mets' best pitchers. His manager, Casey Stengel, told him, "You've gotta be good to lose that many."

Craig lost the first game in Mets' history, 11–4, in St. Louis. (It has been erroneously believed that he gave up the Mets' first run on a balk; although he did commit a balk in the first inning, he already trailed 1–0, and the balk was not a scoring play.) Then, in 1963, from May 4 through August 4, Craig suffered through a personal 18-game losing streak. During it, he changed his uniform number from his traditional 38 to "unlucky" 13 in an attempt to break the 90-day winless stretch. Craig finally ended the drought with a complete game, 7–3 win over the Chicago Cubs at the Polo Grounds on August 9—a game the Mets won in the ninth inning on a walk-off grand-slam home run by Jim Hickman. The victory improved Craig's record to 3–20.

A master of the split-finger fastball, Craig worked in 368 games over the course of his 12-year MLB career. He won ten or more games in 1956, 1959, and 1962, and posted a 74–98 won–lost mark (59–52 not counting his Mets' tenure). In 1,536 1/3 career innings pitched, he surrendered 1,528 hits and 522 bases on balls, with 803 strikeouts and a 3.83 earned run average. He threw seven shutouts and 58 complete games, and earned 19 saves. His late MLB tenure consisted of one-year stops with the Cardinals (1964), Cincinnati Reds (1965), and Philadelphia Phillies (1966). Although he performed poorly during the 1959 World Series, Craig helped pitch the 1959 Los Angeles Dodgers to the National League pennant, winning 11 games (with complete-game victories in his last three starts), posting a brilliant 2.06 ERA, and leading his league in shutouts (four), despite making only 17 starts and spending part of the season with the Triple-A Spokane Indians. Overall he appeared in four World Series; in seven games and 26 1/3 innings pitched, he allowed 19 earned runs on 31 hits and 16 bases on balls, and struck out 25. He split four World Series decisions and compiled a 6.49 ERA.

== Coach and manager ==
Craig retired from the mound after the 1966 campaign and rejoined the Dodgers as a scout (1967) and manager of Double-A Albuquerque (1968). In 1969, former Dodger general manager Buzzie Bavasi appointed Craig the first pitching coach in the history of the newly born San Diego Padres. Enduring the growing pains of another expansion team, Craig spent four years as the Padres' mound tutor before he was replaced by ex-teammate Johnny Podres. After another brief return to the Dodgers as a minor league pitching instructor in 1973, Craig resumed his MLB coaching career with the Houston Astros (1974–1975) and had a second tour with the Padres (1976–1977). During the latter year, the Padres lost 93 games under two managers, John McNamara and Alvin Dark.

In March 1978—in the midst of spring training, and only two weeks before Opening Day—the Padres' ownership fired Dark for "miscommunication" with his players and elevated Craig to the manager's post. Said Craig at the time: "It was the shock of my life, but the best shock I've ever had. My main task now is to get the players to relax so they can perform to the best of their capabilities." The 1978 Padres responded to Craig's leadership, improving by 15 games over 1977 and posting the first winning season (84–78) in franchise history. However, Craig's 1979 team took a giant step backward, reverting to a poor 68–93 record. Craig was fired at season's end and replaced by Jerry Coleman, the former Yankee second baseman then serving as the radio voice of the Padres.

The firing eventually proved to be beneficial to Craig's managing career, however. Sparky Anderson, a former Dodger minor leaguer and coaching colleague of Craig's on the 1969 Padres, had taken over as pilot of the Detroit Tigers in the middle of 1979. He appointed Craig his pitching coach for 1980, and over the next five seasons, Craig molded the Detroit pitching staff (led by bellwethers Jack Morris and Dan Petry) into a formidable group. The 1984 Tigers stormed to a 35–5 start, the American League pennant, and World Series championship (achieved against the San Diego Padres).

The national exposure Craig received burnished his reputation as one of baseball's top pitching coaches and "guru of the split-finger fastball". Said former MLB catcher and manager Mike Scioscia in 2011, “Everyone was throwing that pitch. It was the pitch of the ’80s just like the pitch of the ’60s was a slider.”

But when the Detroit front office refused his request for a salary increase for 1985, Craig retired to his San Diego County ranch. His retirement did not last a full baseball season.

=== San Francisco Giants (1985–1992) ===
From September 18, 1985, through the end of 1992, Craig was the manager of the San Francisco Giants. He replaced Jim Davenport for the final 18 games of the 1985 season, posting a 6–12 record. But in his first five full seasons with the Giants, 1986 through 1990, they never finished with a losing record.

In 1987, Craig's Giants belted 205 home runs, second-most in the major leagues, and won 90 games and the National League Western Division title, to make their first appearance in the postseason since 1971. The Giants' divisional title in 1987 came just two years after they lost 100 games. The club came within one game of going to the World Series that year, losing to the Cardinals in seven games. Reportedly, Craig assigned players to watch the third base coach, a runner on base, and the man at the plate for each game, with the pitcher being told to do pick off attempts to help with studying what was seen. Along the way, Craig brought new popularity to the old baseball term "Humm Baby" — traditional bench and infield chatter that urges pitchers to put extra "mustard" on their fastballs. Brad Gulden, the third-string catcher behind Bob Brenly and Bob Melvin on the 1986 team, was the original “Humm Baby”. The moniker was bestowed on Gulden by Craig, and in the late 1980s the term spread until it applied to the entire team.

In 1989, Craig's Giants won their first National League pennant since 1962. Led by sluggers Kevin Mitchell and Will Clark and starting pitcher Rick Reuschel, they won 92 regular-season games (their most since 1966) and took the NL West title by three games over the Padres. Then they defeated the Cubs in five games in the 1989 National League Championship Series. But Craig's Giants were swept in four games by the Oakland Athletics in the World Series. That Series, the first ever between San Francisco Bay Area teams, was marred by the 1989 Loma Prieta earthquake, which struck October 17, minutes before Game 3, scheduled for Candlestick Park. The quake killed 63 people and caused over 3,750 casualties. It delayed the World Series for ten days.

The Giants then began a slow decline on the field, winning 85 games in 1990, 75 in 1991, and 72 in 1992. Owner Bob Lurie put the team on the market, and when he reached a tentative sales agreement with Florida businessman Vince Naimoli, the club was poised to relocate to Tampa–St. Petersburg for 1993. But, in an eventful offseason, the National League rejected the Lurie-Naimoli deal; it instead approved the Giants' sale to a San Francisco group, headed by Peter Magowan, committed to keeping the club in the Bay Area. The new owners dismissed Craig on December 2. He finished with a career managerial record of 738 wins and 737 losses, 586–566 (.509) with the Giants. Then Magowan's group signed superstar free agent Barry Bonds on December 8. With Bonds anchoring his lineup, Craig's successor, Dusty Baker, won 103 games in 1993 and was named National League Manager of the Year.

== Death ==
Craig was a consultant with the Arizona Diamondbacks during the years Bob Brenly managed the ballclub. He died in San Diego on June 4, 2023, at the age of 93.

== Managerial record ==
Team	Year	Regular season					Postseason			
Team	Year	Games	Won	Lost	Win %	Finish	Won	Lost	Win %	Result
SD	1978	162	84	78	.519	4th in NL West	–	–	–	–
SD	1979	161	68	93	.422	5th in NL West	–	–	–	–
SD total		323	152	171	.471		–	–	–	–
SF	1985	18	6	12	.333	6th in NL West	–	–	–	–
SF	1986	162	83	79	.512	3rd in NL West	–	–	–	–
SF	1987	162	90	72	.556	1st in NL West	3	4	.429	Lost NLCS (STL)
SF	1988	162	83	79	.512	4th in NL West	–	–	–	–
SF	1989	162	92	70	.568	1st in NL West	4	5	.444	Lost World Series (OAK)
SF	1990	162	85	77	.525	3rd in NL West	–	–	–	–
SF	1991	162	75	87	.463	4th in NL West	–	–	–	–
SF	1992	162	72	90	.444	5th in NL West	–	–	–	–
SF total		1,152	586	566	.509		7	9	.438	–
Total		1,475	738	737	.500		7	9	.438	–

Sporting positions
Preceded by Franchise established Tom Morgan	San Diego Padres pitching coach 1969–1972; 1976–1977	Succeeded by Johnny Podres; Chuck Estrada
Preceded by Hub Kittle	Houston Astros pitching coach 1974–1975	Succeeded by Mel Wright
Preceded by Johnny Grodzicki	Detroit Tigers pitching coach 1980–1984	Succeeded by Billy Muffett
