= Bill Almon =

American baseball player (born 1952)

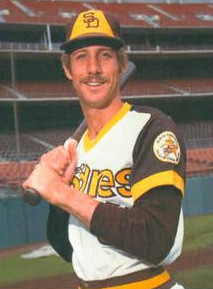
- Almon in 1978
- Infielder
- Born: November 21, 1952 (age 73); Providence, Rhode Island, U.S.
- Batted: Right Threw: Right

MLB debut
- September 2, 1974, for the San Diego Padres

Last MLB appearance
- June 14, 1988, for the Philadelphia Phillies

MLB statistics
- Batting average: .254
- Home runs: 36
- Runs batted in: 296
- Stats at Baseball Reference

Teams
- San Diego Padres (1974–1979); Montreal Expos (1980); New York Mets (1980); Chicago White Sox (1981–1982); Oakland Athletics (1983–1984); Pittsburgh Pirates (1985–1987); New York Mets (1987); Philadelphia Phillies (1988)

William Francis Almon (born November 21, 1952) is an American former professional baseball infielder. He played in Major League Baseball (MLB) for the San Diego Padres, Montreal Expos, New York Mets, Chicago White Sox, Oakland Athletics, Pittsburgh Pirates, and Philadelphia Phillies.

== Amateur career ==
Almon played collegiately at Brown University, and in 1972 and 1973 he played collegiate summer baseball with the Falmouth Commodores of the Cape Cod Baseball League and was named a league all-star in 1973.

== Professional career ==
Almon was the first overall pick in the 1974 amateur draft by the San Diego Padres. After only 39 games in the minor leagues, he was promoted to the majors, debuting on September 2 as the Padres' starting shortstop. Almon made a critical error in the first inning, allowing two runs to score, giving the Atlanta Braves a lead they would not relinquish.

Almon led all major league shortstops in putouts with 303 in 1977 and the National League in sacrifice hits with 20 that same year. The Padres traded him to the Montreal Expos after the 1979 season, and he was signed by the New York Mets midway through the 1980 season. Almon was picked up by the Chicago White Sox for the 1981 season, which proved to be his best season. As the starting shortstop for the White Sox, he hit .301 with 16 stolen bases, ranking 19th in Most Valuable Player voting.

Almon played in the Major Leagues until 1988, seeing playing time for the Oakland Athletics, Pittsburgh Pirates, as well as the Mets on a second tour of duty, before finishing his career with 20 games for the Philadelphia Phillies in 1988.
