= Mike Champion (baseball) =

American baseball player (born 1955)

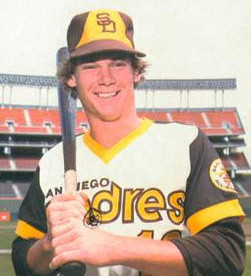
- Champion in 1978
- Second baseman
- Born: February 10, 1955 (age 71); Montgomery, Alabama, U.S.
- Batted: Right Threw: Right

MLB debut
- September 14, 1976, for the San Diego Padres

Last MLB appearance
- September 24, 1978, for the San Diego Padres

MLB statistics
- Batting average: .229
- Home runs: 2
- Runs batted in: 49
- Stats at Baseball Reference

Teams
- San Diego Padres (1976–1978)

Robert Michael Champion (born February 10, 1955) is a former Major League Baseball player from 1976 to 1978 for the San Diego Padres. He primarily played second base. His daughter, Autumn, played softball for the University of Arizona as an outfielder from 2003–2005.
