= San Diego Padres all-time roster =

List of baseball players

This list is complete and up-to-date as of May 7, 2026.

The following is a list of players, both past and current, who appeared in at least one game for the San Diego Padres franchise.

Players in Bold are members of the National Baseball Hall of Fame.

Players in Italics have had their numbers retired by the team.

== A ==
- Shawn Abner
- CJ Abrams
- Ed Acosta
- Jason Adam
- Austin Adams
- Mike Adams
- Jon Adkins
- Nick Ahmed
- Sergio Alcántara
- Mike Aldrete
- Manny Alexander
- Jorge Alfaro
- Eliézer Alfonzo
- Austin Allen
- Dusty Allen
- Greg Allen
- Logan Allen
- Carlos Almanzar
- Bill Almon
- Abraham Almonte
- **Roberto Alomar**
- Sandy Alomar Jr.
- Yonder Alonso
- Matty Alou
- Dan Altavilla
- Gabe Alvarez
- R. J. Alvarez
- Alexi Amarista
- Chip Ambres
- Héctor Ambriz
- Larry Andersen
- Dwain Anderson
- Shaun Anderson
- John Andreoli
- Miguel Andújar
- Matt Antonelli
- José Arcia
- Oswaldo Arcia
- Alex Arias
- George Arias
- Steve Arlin
- Mike Armstrong
- Luis Arráez
- Jake Arrieta
- Randy Asadoor
- Andy Ashby
- Tucker Ashford
- Pedro Astacio
- Carlos Asuaje
- Rich Aurilia
- Brad Ausmus
- Pedro Ávila
- Erick Aybar
- José Azócar
- Oscar Azócar

== B ==
- Cha Seung Baek
- Carlos Baerga
- Michel Báez
- Chuck Baker
- John Baker
- Jack Baldschun
- Josh Banks
- Josh Bard
- Josh Barfield
- Kevin Barker
- Clint Barmes
- Marty Barrett
- Michael Barrett
- Jason Bartlett
- Bob Barton
- Anthony Bass
- Randy Bass
- Rich Batchelor
- Matthew Batten
- Buddy Baumann
- Mike Baxter
- Jason Bay
- Trey Beamon
- Bill Bean
- Matt Beaty
- Rod Beck
- Glenn Beckert
- David Bednar
- Derek Bell
- Heath Bell
- Josh Bell
- Mark Bellhorn
- Andy Benes
- Gary Bennett
- Joaquín Benoit
- Sean Bergman
- Ryan Bergert
- Victor Bernal
- Andrés Berumen
- Jim Beswick
- Christian Bethancourt
- Kurt Bevacqua
- Dann Bilardello
- Dennis Blair
- Willie Blair
- Henry Blanco
- Kyle Blanks
- Jabari Blash
- Curt Blefary
- Geoff Blum
- Hiram Bocachica
- Doug Bochtler
- Bruce Bochy
- Brian Boehringer
- Xander Bogaerts
- Ronald Bolaños
- Ricky Bones
- Juan Bonilla
- Greg Booker
- Bret Boone
- Danny Boone
- Jase Bowen
- Rob Bowen
- Brad Boxberger
- Jason Boyd
- Blaine Boyer
- Brad Brach
- Milton Bradley
- Darren Bragg
- Russell Branyan
- Ángel Bravo
- Dewon Brazelton
- Craig Breslow
- Colten Brewer
- Dan Briggs
- Jhony Brito
- Doug Brocail
- Trenton Brooks
- Jim Brower
- Bobby Brown
- Chris Brown
- Emil Brown
- Jarvis Brown
- Kevin Brown
- Ollie Brown
- Jim Bruske
- Brian Buchanan
- Ryan Buchter
- Billy Buckner
- Al Bumbry
- Chris Burke
- Greg Burke
- Cory Burns
- Sean Burroughs
- Terry Burrows
- Randy Byers
- Mike Bynum

== C ==
- Everth Cabrera
- Trevor Cahill
- Mike Caldwell
- Daniel Camarena
- Kevin Cameron
- Mike Cameron
- Ken Caminiti
- Dave Campbell
- Mike Campbell
- Leonel Campos
- Luis Campusano
- Chris Cannizzaro
- Robinson Canó
- Jorge Cantú
- Carter Capps
- Victor Caratini
- Javier Cardona
- Luke Carlin
- Drew Carlton
- Buddy Carlyle
- Andrew Carpenter
- Matt Carpenter
- Cesar Carrillo
- Joe Carter
- Dave Cash
- Andrew Cashner
- Jack Cassel
- Scott Cassidy
- Nick Castellanos
- Vinny Castilla
- Iván Castillo
- José Castillo
- Tony Castillo
- Jason Castro
- Dylan Cease
- Andújar Cedeño
- Ronny Cedeño
- Jhoulys Chacín
- Mike Champion
- Floyd Chiffer
- Ji-Man Choi
- Archi Cianfrocco
- Adam Cimber
- Pedro Ciriaco
- Jeff Cirillo
- Brady Clark
- Jack Clark
- Jerald Clark
- Jermaine Clark
- Phil Clark
- Tony Clark
- Horace Clarke
- Paul Clemens
- Matt Clement
- Pat Clements
- Mike Clevinger
- Mike Colangelo
- Nate Colbert
- Dusty Coleman
- Keith Comstock
- Clay Condrey
- Brooks Conrad
- Scott Coolbaugh
- Danny Coombs
- Joey Cora
- Franchy Cordero
- Allen Córdoba
- Bryan Corey
- Mike Corkins
- Pat Corrales
- Kevin Correia
- Nestor Cortes
- Jarred Cosart
- Tom Cosgrove
- John Costello
- Mike Couchee
- Callix Crabbe
- César Crespo
- Nabil Crismatt
- Jake Cronenworth
- Deivi Cruz
- José Cruz Jr.
- Nelson Cruz
- Omar Cruz
- Will Cunnane
- Aaron Cunningham
- John Curtis
- Jack Cust
- Éric Cyr

== D ==
- John D'Acquisto
- Chase d'Arnaud
- Paul Dade
- David Dahl
- James Darnell
- Mike Darr
- Yu Darvish
- Doug Dascenzo
- Jerry DaVanon
- Tom Davey
- Zach Davies
- Austin Davis
- Ben Davis
- Bill Davis
- Bob Davis
- Gerry Davis
- John Davis
- Mark Davis
- Storm Davis
- Willie Davis
- Roger Deago
- Tommy Dean
- Cody Decker
- Jaff Decker
- Marty Decker
- Samuel Deduno
- Rob Deer
- Kory DeHaan
- Eulogio de la Cruz
- Luis DeLeón
- Enyel De Los Santos
- Chris Denorfia
- Jim Deshaies
- Odrisamer Despaigne
- Ross Detwiler
- Matt DeWitt
- Elías Díaz
- Miguel Díaz
- Alex Dickerson
- Miguel Diloné
- Glenn Dishman
- Brandon Dixon
- Pat Dobson
- José Domínguez
- Brian Dorsett
- Paul Doyle
- Dave Dravecky
- Brandon Drury
- Tom Dukes
- Mike Dunne
- Mike Dupree
- Rodolfo Durán
- Luis Durango

== E ==
- Adam Eaton
- David Eckstein
- Jim Edmonds
- Carl Edwards Jr.
- Dave Edwards
- Jon Edwards
- Juan Eichelberger
- Dave Eiland
- Mike Ekstrom
- Donnie Elliott
- Randy Elliott
- A. J. Ellis
- Alan Embree
- Adam Engel
- Morgan Ensberg
- Todd Erdos
- Robbie Erlin
- Jake Esch
- Shawn Estes
- Jeremiah Estrada
- Mark Ettles
- Barry Evans
- Leon Everitt

== F ==
- Bill Fahey
- Brian Falkenborg
- Irving Falu
- Paul Faries
- Freddy Fermin
- Tony Fernández
- Al Ferrara
- Robert Fick
- Jeremy Fikac
- **Rollie Fingers**
- Steve Finley
- Mike Fiore
- Steve Fireovid
- John Flaherty
- Tim Flannery
- Bryce Florie
- Cliff Floyd
- Rich Folkers
- Logan Forsythe
- Alan Foster
- Ty France
- Jeff Francoeur
- Jay Franklin
- Adam Frazier
- Dave Freisleben
- Christian Friedrich
- Ernesto Frieri
- Danny Frisella
- Reymond Fuentes
- Tito Fuentes
- Jeff Fulchino

== G ==
- Rocky Gale
- Sean Gallagher
- Freddy Galvis
- Oscar Gamble
- Ron Gant
- Frank Garcés
- Carlos García
- Greg Garcia
- Jesse Garcia
- Luis García
- Ralph Garcia
- Jeff Gardner
- Wes Gardner
- Jon Garland
- Steve Garvey
- Rod Gaspar
- Cito Gaston
- Chad Gaudin
- Josh Geer
- Bob Geren
- Rusty Gerhardt
- Justin Germano
- Jody Gerut
- Brian Giles
- Marcus Giles
- Logan Gillaspie
- Ed Giovanola
- Joe Goddard
- Jake Goebbert
- Chris Gomez
- Pat Gomez
- Adrián González
- Alberto González
- Alex Gonzalez
- Edgar Gonzalez
- Enrique González
- Fernando González
- Tony González
- Oscar González
- Wiki González
- MacKenzie Gore
- Tom Gorman
- **Rich Gossage**
- Yasmani Grandal
- Mark Grant
- Gary Green
- Khalil Greene
- Brian Greer
- Luke Gregerson
- Bill Greif
- Mike Griffin
- Tom Griffin
- Trent Grisham
- Johnny Grubb
- Javy Guerra
- Tayron Guerrero
- Carlos Guevara
- Yuli Gurriel
- Ricky Gutiérrez
- Domingo Guzmán
- Freddy Guzmán
- Jesús Guzmán
- Doug Gwosdz
- Chris Gwynn
- **Tony Gwynn**
- Tony Gwynn Jr.
- Jedd Gyorko

== H ==
- Luther Hackman
- Josh Hader
- Charlie Haeger
- Don Hahn
- Jesse Hahn
- Jerry Hairston Jr.
- Scott Hairston
- Joey Hamilton
- Atlee Hammaker
- Chris Hammond
- Justin Hampson
- Erik Hamren
- Brad Hand
- Dave Hansen
- Aaron Harang
- Larry Hardy
- Mike Hargrove
- Gene Harris
- Greg A. Harris
- Greg W. Harris
- Kyle Hart
- Andy Hawkins
- Brad Hawpe
- Dirk Hayhurst
- Ray Hayward
- Chase Headley
- Austin Hedges
- **Rickey Henderson**
- George Hendrick
- Sean Henn
- Clay Hensley
- Ron Herbel
- Matt Herges
- Dustin Hermanson
- Jeremy Hermida
- Carlos Hernández
- Enzo Hernández
- Nick Hernandez
- Jeremy Hernandez
- Ramón Hernández
- Junior Herndon
- Keith Hessler
- Jason Heyward
- Kyle Higashioka
- Kevin Higgins
- Rich Hill
- Shawn Hill
- Tim Hill
- Dave Hilton
- Alex Hinshaw
- George Hinshaw
- Sterling Hitchcock
- Bryan Hoeing
- **Trevor Hoffman**
- Ray Holbert
- Mike Holtz
- Brent Honeywell Jr.
- Eric Hosmer
- Ben Howard
- Thomas Howard
- Jack Howell
- LaMarr Hoyt
- Walt Hriniak
- Trenidad Hubbard
- Justin Huber
- Daniel Hudson
- Orlando Hudson
- Phil Hughes
- Nick Hundley
- Randy Hundley
- Cedric Hunter
- Steve Huntz
- Bruce Hurst
- Tim Hyers
- Colt Hynes
- Adam Hyzdu

== I ==
- Jose Iglesias
- Tadahito Iguchi
- Dane Iorg
- Mike Ivie

== J ==
- Damian Jackson
- Danny Jackson
- Darrin Jackson
- Edwin Jackson
- Jay Jackson
- Roy Lee Jackson
- Alek Jacob
- Chris James
- Travis Jankowski
- Kevin Jarvis
- Jon Jay
- Stan Jefferson
- Garry Jestadt
- Johnny Jeter
- D'Angelo Jiménez
- Brett Jodie
- Connor Joe
- Ben Johnson
- Brian Johnson
- Bryce Johnson
- Erik Johnson
- Jerry Johnson
- Jonathan Johnson
- Mike Johnson
- Pierce Johnson
- Rob Johnson
- Jay Johnstone
- Bobby J. Jones
- Bobby M. Jones
- Chris Jones
- Jimmy Jones
- Randy Jones
- Ruppert Jones
- Von Joshua
- Wally Joyner

== K ==
- Sean Kazmar
- Randy Keisler
- Keone Kela
- Dick Kelley
- Shawn Kelley
- Casey Kelly
- Van Kelly
- Matt Kemp
- Fred Kendall
- Brett Kennedy
- Ian Kennedy
- Terry Kennedy
- Ray Kerr
- Jason Kershner
- Mike Kilkenny
- Ha-seong Kim
- Craig Kimbrel
- Michael King
- Dave Kingman
- Gene Kingsale
- Dennis Kinney
- Ian Kinsler
- Clay Kirby
- Michael Kirkman
- Patrick Kivlehan
- Ryan Klesko
- Reiss Knehr
- Jon Knott
- Brandon Kolb
- Stephen Kolek
- Mark Kotsay
- Kevin Kouzmanoff
- Marc Kroon
- Bill Krueger
- Chris Krug
- John Kruk
- Ted Kubiak
- Fred Kuhaulua

== L ==
- Pete Laforest
- Dinelson Lamet
- Tom Lampkin
- Rick Lancellotti
- Jason Lane
- Mark Langston
- Ray Lankford
- Jody Lansford
- Dave LaPoint
- Greg LaRocca
- Mat Latos
- Eric Lauer
- Ramón Laureano
- Brian Lawrence
- Bill Laxton
- Tom Layne
- Wade LeBlanc
- Wilfredo Ledezma
- David Lee
- Derrek Lee
- Leron Lee
- Mark Lee
- Zach Lee
- Joe Lefebvre
- Craig Lefferts
- Dave Leiper
- Justin Leone
- Jim Lewis
- Jim Leyritz
- Sixto Lezcano
- Luis Liberato
- Frankie Libran
- Derek Lilliquist
- Scott Linebrink
- Rymer Liriano
- John Littlefield
- Scott Livingstone
- Kyle Lloyd
- José Lobatón
- Walker Lockett
- Keith Lockhart
- Gene Locklear
- Brandon Lockridge
- Carlton Loewer
- Mickey Lolich
- Tim Lollar
- Joey Long
- Terrence Long
- Arturo López
- Luis Lopez
- Raffy Lopez
- Rodrigo López
- Mark Loretta
- Aaron Loup
- Gary Lucas
- Joey Lucchesi
- Ryan Ludwick
- Cory Luebke
- Seth Lugo
- David Lundquist
- Jordan Lyles
- Fred Lynn

== M ==
- John Mabry
- Manny Machado
- Drew Macias
- Shane Mack
- Rob Mackowiak
- **Greg Maddux**
- Mike Maddux
- Dave Magadan
- Kazuhisa Makita
- Martin Maldonado
- Sean Manaea
- Jerry Manuel
- Tucupita Marcano
- Nick Margevicius
- Manuel Margot
- Ron Marinaccio
- Jake Marisnick
- Jason Marquis
- Dave Marshall
- Al Martin
- Carmelo Martínez
- José Martínez
- Luis Martínez
- Nick Martinez
- Pedro A. Martínez
- Nick Martini
- Don Mason
- Roger Mason
- Jorge Mateo
- Marcos Mateo
- Phil Maton
- Julius Matos
- Yuki Matsui
- Gary Matthews Jr.
- Mike Matthews
- Brandon Maurer
- Dave Maurer
- Tim Mauser
- Darrell May
- Cameron Maybin
- Nomar Mazara
- Adam Mazur
- Cory Mazzoni
- Jim McAndrew
- Paul McAnulty
- Al McBean
- Billy McCool
- **Willie McCovey**
- Mason McCoy
- Lance McCullers
- Ray McDavid
- Chuck McElroy
- Kyle McGrath
- Fred McGriff
- Joe McIntosh
- Marty McLeary
- Kevin McReynolds
- Brian Meadows
- Tommy Medica
- Francisco Mejía
- Seth Mejias-Brean
- Mark Melancon
- José Meléndez
- Luis Meléndez
- Tim Melville
- Donaldo Méndez
- Paul Menhart
- Cla Meredith
- Lou Merloni
- Jackson Merrill
- Butch Metzger
- Dan Miceli
- Jason Middlebrook
- Will Middlebrooks
- Miles Mikolas
- Bob Miller
- Eddie Miller
- Mason Miller
- Doug Mirabelli
- Bryan Mitchell
- Kevin Mitchell
- Casey Mize
- Sid Monge
- Willie Montañez
- John Montefusco
- Steve Montgomery
- Adam Moore
- Jerry Morales
- Rich Morales
- Adrián Morejón
- David Morgan
- Keith Moreland
- Mitch Moreland
- Edwin Moreno
- José Moreno
- Juan Moreno
- Brandon Morrow
- Colt Morton
- Dustin Moseley
- Jerry Moses
- José Mota
- James Mouton
- Edward Mujica
- Sean Mulligan
- Jerry Mumphrey
- Andrés Muñoz
- Steve Mura
- Dan Murphy
- Heath Murray
- Ivan Murrell
- Joe Musgrove
- Greg Myers
- Randy Myers
- Rodney Myers
- Wil Myers
- Brian Myrow

== N ==
- Xavier Nady
- Charles Nagy
- Josh Naylor
- Blaine Neal
- Chris Nelson
- Rob Nelson
- Pat Neshek
- Graig Nettles
- Phil Nevin
- Marc Newfield
- David Newhan
- Kevin Nicholson
- Doug Nickle
- Joe Niekro
- Melvin Nieves
- Wil Nieves
- Jacob Nix
- Austin Nola
- Eric Nolte
- Nick Noonan
- Fred Norman
- Bud Norris
- Derek Norris
- Aaron Northcraft
- James Norwood
- Eduarniel Núñez
- José Núñez
- Jerry Nyman

== O ==
- Rougned Odor
- Brian O'Grady
- Ryan O'Hearn
- Ross Ohlendorf
- Miguel Ojeda
- Edward Olivares
- Miguel Olivo
- Jorge Oña
- Mike Oquist
- Tirso Ornelas
- Eddie Oropesa
- Jesse Orosco
- Jimmy Osting
- Sean O'Sullivan
- Al Osuna
- Antonio Osuna
- Akinori Otsuka
- Dillon Overton
- Bob Owchinko
- Eric Owens
- Micah Owings
- Chris Oxspring

== P ==
- Chris Paddack
- Emilio Pagán
- Mike Pagliarulo
- Vicente Palacios
- Lowell Palmer
- Matt Palmer
- Mark Parent
- Chan Ho Park
- Andy Parrino
- Luis Patiño
- Bob Patterson
- Eric Patterson
- Scott Patterson
- Troy Patton
- Graham Pauley
- Jay Payton
- Jason Pearson
- Jake Peavy
- Alex Pelaez
- Roberto Peña
- David Peralta
- Wandy Peralta
- Luis Perdomo (b. 1984)
- Luis Perdomo (b. 1993)
- Martín Pérez
- Óliver Pérez
- Santiago Pérez
- Broderick Perkins
- Sam Perlozzo
- **Gaylord Perry**
- Roberto Petagine
- Adam Peterson
- Jace Peterson
- Gary Pettis
- Tommy Pham
- Kyle Phillips
- Mike Phillips
- Tom Phoebus
- **Mike Piazza**
- Kevin Pickford
- José Pirela
- Joe Pittman
- Nick Pivetta
- Phil Plantier
- Johnny Podres
- Drew Pomeranz
- Aaron Poreda
- Jim Presley
- Jurickson Profar
- Brandon Puffer
- Tim Pyznarski

== Q ==
- Kevin Quackenbush
- Chad Qualls
- Cal Quantrill
- Paul Quantrill
- Carlos Quentin
- Humberto Quintero

== R ==
- Doug Rader
- Aaron Rakers
- Alexei Ramírez
- Mario Ramírez
- Nick Ramirez
- Roberto Ramírez
- Cesar Ramos
- Joe Randa
- Cody Ransom
- Dennis Rasmussen
- Eric Rasmussen
- Colin Rea
- Randy Ready
- Chris Rearick
- Frank Reberger
- Tim Redding
- Jody Reed
- Steve Reed
- Chad Reineke
- Desi Relaford
- Hunter Renfroe
- Merv Rettenmund
- Carlos Reyes
- Dennys Reyes
- Franmil Reyes
- Gerardo Reyes
- Don Reynolds
- Ken Reynolds
- Ronn Reynolds
- Sean Reynolds
- Clayton Richard
- Garrett Richards
- Gene Richards
- Adam Riggs
- Royce Ring
- Webster Rivas
- Mike Rivera
- René Rivera
- Roberto Rivera
- Rubén Rivera
- Anthony Rizzo
- Joe Roa
- Donn Roach
- Bip Roberts
- Dave Roberts (P)
- Dave Roberts (3B)
- Dave Roberts (CF)
- Chris Robinson
- Dave Robinson
- Kerry Robinson
- Óscar Robles
- Rafael Robles
- Fernando Rodney
- Aurelio Rodríguez
- Bradgley Rodríguez
- Eddy Rodríguez
- Edwin Rodríguez
- Luis Rodriguez
- Rich Rodríguez
- Roberto Rodríguez
- Ron Roenicke
- Taylor Rogers
- Mandy Romero
- Vicente Romo
- José Rondón
- Brent Rooker
- Adam Rosales
- Eguy Rosario
- Steve Rosenberg
- Trevor Rosenthal
- John Roskos
- Dave Ross
- Gary Ross
- Tyson Ross
- Jerry Royster
- Sonny Ruberto
- Esteury Ruiz
- José Ruiz
- Glendon Rusch
- Adam Russell
- Marc Rzepczynski

== S ==
- A. J. Sager
- Ethan Salas
- Luis Salazar
- Oscar Salazar
- Duaner Sánchez
- Héctor Sánchez
- Reggie Sanders
- Scott Sanders
- Benito Santiago
- Al Santorini
- Luis Sardiñas
- Rick Sawyer
- Pat Scanlon
- Mark Schaeffer
- Ryan Schimpf
- Calvin Schiraldi
- Don Schulze
- John Scott
- Tanner Scott
- Tayler Scott
- Tim Scott
- Evan Scribner
- Chandler Seagle
- Rudy Seánez
- JP Sears
- Todd Sears
- Dick Selma
- Frank Seminara
- Dan Serafini
- Wascar Serrano
- Al Severinsen
- Dick Sharon
- Andy Sheets
- Gavin Sheets
- Gary Sheffield
- Darrell Sherman
- James Shields
- Jason Shiell
- Craig Shipley
- Bob Shirley
- Eric Show
- Terry Shumpert
- Paul Siebert
- Sonny Siebert
- Candy Sierra
- Brian Sikorski
- Walter Silva
- Steve Simpson
- John Sipin
- Tommie Sisk
- Don Slaught
- Terrmel Sledge
- Ron Slocum
- Heathcliff Slocumb
- Burch Smith
- Jake Smith
- **Ozzie Smith**
- Pete J. Smith
- Seth Smith
- Blake Snell
- Frank Snook
- Donovan Solano
- Yangervis Solarte
- Alí Solís
- Elías Sosa
- Juan Soto
- Cory Spangenberg
- Josh Spence
- Stan Spencer
- Ed Spiezio
- Dan Spillner
- Ed Sprague
- George Stablein
- Larry Stahl
- Matt Stairs
- Craig Stammen
- Fred Stanley
- Craig Stansberry
- Dave Staton
- Tim Stauffer
- Jim Steels
- Phil Stephenson
- Todd Steverson
- Chris Stewart
- Kurt Stillwell
- Craig Stimac
- Robert Stock
- Bob Stoddard
- Tim Stoddard
- Ricky Stone
- Matt Strahm
- Huston Street
- Brent Strom
- Eric Stults
- Robert Suárez
- Brett Sullivan
- Champ Summers
- Jeff Suppan
- Gary Sutherland
- Brian Sweeney
- Mark Sweeney
- Rick Sweet
- Steve Swisher
- Matt Szczur
- Jason Szuminski

== T ==
- Jeff Tabaka
- Dennis Tankersley
- Domingo Tapia
- Fernando Tatís Jr.
- Jim Tatum
- Kerry Taylor
- Ron Taylor
- Miguel Tejada
- Blake Tekotte
- Tom Tellmann
- Garry Templeton
- Gene Tenace
- Walt Terrell
- Tim Teufel
- Bob Tewksbury
- Joe Thatcher
- Dale Thayer
- Derrel Thomas
- Jason Thompson
- Mike Thompson
- Trayce Thompson
- Dickie Thon
- Matt Thornton
- Mark Thurmond
- Ron Tingley
- Bobby Tolan
- Freddie Toliver
- Brian Tollberg
- Brett Tomko
- Dave Tomlin
- Yorvit Torrealba
- Luis Torrens
- Alex Torres
- Héctor Torres
- José Torres
- Bubba Trammell
- Rich Troedson
- J. J. Trujillo
- Jerry Turner
- Kyle Tyler

== U ==
- B. J. Upton
- Justin Upton
- Luis Urías
- John Urrea

== V ==
- Ismael Valdez
- José Valdez
- Rafael Valdez
- Wilson Valdez
- Bobby Valentine
- Fernando Valenzuela
- Ben Van Ryn
- John Vander Wal
- César Vargas
- Randy Vásquez
- Jim Vatcher
- Greg Vaughn
- Ramón Vázquez
- Jorge Velandia
- Guillermo Velasquez
- Vince Velasquez
- Will Venable
- Darío Veras
- Quilvio Veras
- Shane Victorino
- Brandon Villafuerte
- Carlos Villanueva
- Christian Villanueva
- Ron Villone
- Nick Vincent
- Joe Vitiello
- Luke Voit
- Edinson Vólquez
- Ed Vosberg

== W ==
- Michael Wacha
- Tyler Wade
- Will Wagner
- Matt Waldron
- Kevin Walker
- Pete Walker
- Todd Walker
- Donne Wall
- Brett Wallace
- Gene Walter
- Dan Walters
- Kevin Ward
- Adam Warren
- Mark Wasinger
- Steve Watkins
- Ryan Weathers
- Jered Weaver
- Ryan Webb
- Tyler Webb
- Thad Weber
- Ray Webster
- Jemile Weeks
- Dave Wehrmeister
- David Wells
- Jared Wells
- Kip Wells
- Chris Welsh
- Don Wengert
- Andrew Werner
- Matt Whisenant
- Rondell White
- Wally Whitehurst
- Matt Whiteside
- Ed Whitson
- Rowan Wick
- Brad Wieck
- Joe Wieland
- Alan Wiggins
- Mark Wiley
- Jim Wilhelm
- Rick Wilkins
- Bernie Williams
- Brian Williams
- Eddie Williams
- George Williams
- Jim Williams
- Randy Williams
- Taylor Williams
- Woody Williams
- Scott Williamson
- Ron Willis
- Earl Wilson
- Josh Wilson
- Steven Wilson
- **Dave Winfield**
- Trey Wingenter
- Rick Wise
- Matt Wisler
- Jay Witasick
- Kevin Witt
- Ed Wojna
- Jackson Wolf
- Randy Wolf
- Travis Wood
- Tim Worrell
- Jaret Wright
- Marvell Wynne

== Y ==
- Eric Yardley
- Kirby Yates
- Chris Young
- Eric Young

== Z ==
- Lance Zawadzki
