= 1974 San Diego Padres season =

1974 San Diego Padres
- League: National League
- Division: West
- Ballpark: San Diego Stadium
- City: San Diego, California
- Record: 60–102 (.370)
- Divisional place: 6th
- Owners: C. Arnholt Smith, Ray Kroc
- General managers: Peter Bavasi
- Managers: John McNamara
- Radio: KOGO (Jerry Coleman, Bob Chandler)

The 1974 San Diego Padres season was the sixth in franchise history. The team finished last in the National League West with a record of 60–102, 42 games behind the Los Angeles Dodgers.

== Offseason ==
- October 25, 1973: Mike Caldwell was traded by the Padres to the San Francisco Giants for Willie McCovey and Bernie Williams.
- November 7, 1973: Jerry Morales was traded by the Padres to the Chicago Cubs for Glenn Beckert and Bobby Fenwick.

== Regular season ==
In his first home game as the Padres' new owner in 1974, Ray Kroc grabbed the public address system microphone and apologized to fans for the poor performance of the team, saying, "I've never seen such stupid ballplaying in my life." At the same time, a streaker raced across the field, eluding security personnel. Kroc shouted, "Throw him in jail!"

=== Opening Day starters ===
- Steve Arlin
- Glenn Beckert
- Nate Colbert
- Johnny Grubb
- Enzo Hernández
- Fred Kendall
- Willie McCovey
- Derrel Thomas
- Bobby Tolan

=== Season standings ===
NL West
| Team | W | L | Pct. | GB | Home | Road |
|---|---|---|---|---|---|---|
| Los Angeles Dodgers | 102 | 60 | .630 | — | 52‍–‍29 | 50‍–‍31 |
| Cincinnati Reds | 98 | 64 | .605 | 4 | 50‍–‍31 | 48‍–‍33 |
| Atlanta Braves | 88 | 74 | .543 | 14 | 46‍–‍35 | 42‍–‍39 |
| Houston Astros | 81 | 81 | .500 | 21 | 46‍–‍35 | 35‍–‍46 |
| San Francisco Giants | 72 | 90 | .444 | 30 | 37‍–‍44 | 35‍–‍46 |
| San Diego Padres | 60 | 102 | .370 | 42 | 36‍–‍45 | 24‍–‍57 |

=== Record vs. opponents ===
1974 National League record Sources:
| Team | ATL | CHC | CIN | HOU | LAD | MON | NYM | PHI | PIT | SD | SF | STL |
|---|---|---|---|---|---|---|---|---|---|---|---|---|
| Atlanta | — | 4–8 | 7–11–1 | 6–12 | 8–10 | 9–3 | 8–4 | 8–4 | 4–8 | 17–1 | 8–10 | 9–3 |
| Chicago | 8–4 | — | 5–7 | 4–8 | 2–10 | 5–13 | 8–10 | 8–10 | 9–9 | 6–6 | 6–6 | 5–13 |
| Cincinnati | 11–7–1 | 7–5 | — | 14–4 | 6–12 | 6–6 | 9–3 | 8–4 | 8–4 | 12–6 | 11–7 | 6–6 |
| Houston | 12–6 | 8–4 | 4–14 | — | 5–13 | 6–6 | 6–6 | 6–6 | 5–7 | 7–11 | 10–8 | 8–4 |
| Los Angeles | 10–8 | 10–2 | 12–6 | 13–5 | — | 8–4 | 5–7 | 6–6 | 4–8 | 16–2 | 12–6 | 6–6 |
| Montreal | 3–9 | 13–5 | 6–6 | 6–6 | 4–8 | — | 9–9 | 11–7 | 9–9 | 6–6 | 4–8 | 8–9 |
| New York | 4–8 | 10–8 | 3–9 | 6–6 | 7–5 | 9–9 | — | 7–11 | 7–11 | 6–6 | 6–6 | 6–12 |
| Philadelphia | 4-8 | 10–8 | 4–8 | 6–6 | 6–6 | 7–11 | 11–7 | — | 10–8 | 5–7 | 8–4 | 9–9 |
| Pittsburgh | 8–4 | 9–9 | 4–8 | 7–5 | 8–4 | 9–9 | 11–7 | 8–10 | — | 9–3 | 8–4 | 7–11 |
| San Diego | 1–17 | 6–6 | 6–12 | 7–11 | 2–16 | 6–6 | 6–6 | 7–5 | 3–9 | — | 11–7 | 5–7 |
| San Francisco | 10–8 | 6–6 | 7–11 | 8–10 | 6–12 | 8–4 | 6–6 | 4–8 | 4–8 | 7–11 | — | 6–6 |
| St. Louis | 3–9 | 13–5 | 6–6 | 4–8 | 6–6 | 9–8 | 12–6 | 9–9 | 11–7 | 7–5 | 6–6 | — |

=== Notable transactions ===
- May 31, 1974: Horace Clarke and Lowell Palmer was purchased by the Padres from the New York Yankees.
- June 5, 1974: 1974 Major League Baseball draft
  - Bill Almon was drafted by the Padres in the 1st round (1st pick).
  - Lenn Sakata was drafted by the Padres in the 5th round, but did not sign.
  - Bump Wills was drafted by the Padres in the 12th round, but did not sign.

=== Roster ===
1974 San Diego Padres
Roster
| Pitchers: 22 Steve Arlin; 40 Mike Corkins; 43 Dave Freisleben; 46 Ralph Garcia; 38 Rusty Gerhardt; 27 Bill Greif; 25 Larry Hardy; 22 Mike Johnson; 35 Randy Jones; 36 Bill Laxton; 36 Jim McAndrew; 24 Joe McIntosh; 29 Lowell Palmer; 45 Vicente Romo; 33 Gary Ross; 48 Dan Spillner; 37 Dave Tomlin; 47 Rich Troedson | Catchers: 26 Bob Barton; 10 Chris Cannizzaro; 16 Fred Kendall; Infielders: 6 Bill Almon; 18 Glenn Beckert; 7 Horace Clarke; 17 Nate Colbert; 11 Enzo Hernández; 8 Dave Hilton; 15 Mike Ivie; 44 Willie McCovey; 6 Rich Morales; 20 Dave Roberts; 30 Derrel Thomas | Outfielders: 32 Matty Alou; 3 Randy Elliott; 23 Rod Gaspar; 21 Cito Gaston; 2 Johnny Grubb; 32 Gene Locklear; 34 John Scott; 28 Bobby Tolan; 42 Jerry Turner; 23 Bernie Williams; 31 Dave Winfield | Manager: 1 John McNamara; Coaches: 4 Jack Bloomfield (Hitting & First Base); 12 Jim Davenport (Third Base); 9 Bill Posedel (Pitching); 19 Whitey Wietelmann (Bullpen) |

== Player stats ==
| = Indicates team leader |

=== Batting ===
==== Starters by position ====
Note: Pos = Position; G = Games played; AB = At bats; H = Hits; Avg. = Batting average; HR = Home runs; RBI = Runs batted in

| Pos | Player | G | AB | H | Avg. | HR | RBI |
|---|---|---|---|---|---|---|---|
| C | Fred Kendall | 141 | 424 | 98 | .231 | 8 | 45 |
| 1B | Willie McCovey | 128 | 344 | 87 | .253 | 22 | 63 |
| 2B | Derrel Thomas | 141 | 523 | 129 | .247 | 3 | 41 |
| SS | Enzo Hernández | 147 | 512 | 119 | .232 | 0 | 34 |
| 3B | Dave Roberts | 113 | 318 | 53 | .167 | 5 | 18 |
| LF | Dave Winfield | 145 | 498 | 132 | .265 | 20 | 75 |
| CF | Johnny Grubb | 140 | 444 | 127 | .286 | 8 | 42 |
| RF | Bobby Tolan | 95 | 357 | 95 | .266 | 8 | 40 |

==== Other batters ====
Note: G = Games played; AB = At bats; H = Hits; Avg. = Batting average; HR = Home runs; RBI = Runs batted in

| Player | G | AB | H | Avg. | HR | RBI |
|---|---|---|---|---|---|---|
| Nate Colbert | 119 | 368 | 76 | .207 | 14 | 54 |
| Cito Gaston | 106 | 267 | 57 | .213 | 6 | 33 |
| Dave Hilton | 74 | 217 | 52 | .240 | 1 | 12 |
| Glenn Beckert | 64 | 172 | 44 | .256 | 0 | 7 |
| Horace Clarke | 42 | 90 | 17 | .189 | 0 | 4 |
| Bob Barton | 30 | 81 | 19 | .235 | 0 | 7 |
| Matty Alou | 48 | 81 | 16 | .198 | 0 | 3 |
| Gene Locklear | 39 | 74 | 20 | .270 | 1 | 3 |
| Rich Morales | 54 | 61 | 12 | .197 | 1 | 5 |
| Chris Cannizzaro | 26 | 60 | 11 | .183 | 0 | 4 |
| Jerry Turner | 17 | 48 | 14 | .292 | 0 | 2 |
| Bill Almon | 16 | 38 | 12 | .316 | 0 | 3 |
| Mike Ivie | 12 | 34 | 3 | .088 | 1 | 3 |
| Randy Elliott | 13 | 33 | 7 | .212 | 1 | 2 |
| John Scott | 14 | 15 | 1 | .067 | 0 | 0 |
| Bernie Williams | 14 | 15 | 2 | .133 | 0 | 0 |
| Rod Gaspar | 33 | 14 | 3 | .214 | 0 | 1 |

=== Pitching ===
==== Starting pitchers ====
Note: G = Games pitched; IP = Innings pitched; W = Wins; L = Losses; ERA = Earned run average; SO = Strikeouts

| Player | G | IP | W | L | ERA | SO |
|---|---|---|---|---|---|---|
| Bill Greif | 43 | 226.0 | 9 | 19 | 4.66 | 137 |
| Dave Freisleben | 33 | 211.2 | 9 | 14 | 3.66 | 130 |
| Randy Jones | 40 | 208.1 | 8 | 22 | 4.45 | 124 |
| Dan Spillner | 30 | 148.0 | 9 | 11 | 4.01 | 95 |
| Steve Arlin | 16 | 64.0 | 1 | 7 | 5.91 | 18 |

==== Other pitchers ====
Note: G = Games pitched; IP = Innings pitched; W = Wins; L = Losses; ERA = Earned run average; SO = Strikeouts

| Player | G | IP | W | L | ERA | SO |
|---|---|---|---|---|---|---|
| Lowell Palmer | 22 | 73.0 | 2 | 5 | 5.67 | 52 |
| Jim McAndrew | 15 | 41.2 | 1 | 4 | 5.62 | 16 |
| Joe McIntosh | 10 | 37.1 | 0 | 4 | 3.62 | 22 |

==== Relief pitchers ====
Note: G = Games pitched; W = Wins; L = Losses; SV = Saves; ERA = Earned run average; SO = Strikeouts

| Player | G | W | L | SV | ERA | SO |
|---|---|---|---|---|---|---|
| Vicente Romo | 54 | 5 | 5 | 9 | 4.56 | 26 |
| Larry Hardy | 76 | 9 | 4 | 2 | 4.69 | 57 |
| Dave Tomlin | 47 | 2 | 0 | 2 | 4.34 | 29 |
| Bill Laxton | 30 | 0 | 1 | 0 | 4.03 | 40 |
| Mike Corkins | 25 | 2 | 2 | 0 | 4.79 | 41 |
| Rusty Gerhardt | 23 | 2 | 1 | 1 | 7.07 | 22 |
| Mike Johnson | 18 | 0 | 2 | 0 | 4.64 | 15 |
| Rich Troedson | 15 | 1 | 1 | 1 | 8.68 | 11 |
| Gary Ross | 9 | 0 | 0 | 0 | 4.50 | 11 |
| Ralph Garcia | 8 | 0 | 0 | 0 | 6.10 | 9 |

== Awards and honors ==
1974 Major League Baseball All-Star Game

- Johnny Grubb, OF, reserve

== Farm system ==
| Level | Team | League | Manager |
|---|---|---|---|
| AAA | Hawaii Islanders | Pacific Coast League | Roy Hartsfield |
| AA | Alexandria Aces | Texas League | Jackie Brandt and Ken Bracey |
| A-Short Season | Walla Walla Padres | Northwest League | Cliff Ditto |
