= 1975 San Diego Padres season =

1975 San Diego Padres
- League: National League
- Division: West
- Ballpark: San Diego Stadium
- City: San Diego, California
- Record: 71–91 (.438)
- Divisional place: 4th
- Owners: Ray Kroc
- General managers: Peter Bavasi
- Managers: John McNamara
- Radio: KOGO (Jerry Coleman, Bob Chandler)

The 1975 San Diego Padres season was the seventh in franchise history. The Padres finished in fourth place in the National League West, the first time that they did not finish last in the division.

== Offseason ==
- October 3, 1974: Horace Clarke was released by the Padres.
- November 8, 1974: Cito Gaston was traded by the Padres to the Atlanta Braves for Danny Frisella.
- November 18, 1974: Nate Colbert was traded by the Padres to the Detroit Tigers as part of a 3-team trade. The Padres sent a player to be named later to the St. Louis Cardinals. The Tigers sent Bob Strampe and Dick Sharon to the Padres, and the Cardinals sent Alan Foster, Rich Folkers, and Sonny Siebert to the Padres. The Tigers sent Ed Brinkman to the Cardinals. The Padres completed the deal by sending Danny Breeden to the Cardinals on December 12, 1974.
- December 6, 1974: Derrel Thomas was traded by the Padres to the San Francisco Giants for Tito Fuentes and Butch Metzger.

=== Draft picks ===
- January 9, 1975: 1975 Major League Baseball draft
  - Gene Richards was drafted by the Padres in the 1st round (1st pick).
  - Rick Sweet was drafted in the 3rd round of the Secondary Phase.

== Regular season ==
=== Season standings ===
NL West
Team	W	L	Pct.	GB	Home	Road
Cincinnati Reds	108	54	.667	—	64‍–‍17	44‍–‍37
Los Angeles Dodgers	88	74	.543	20	49‍–‍32	39‍–‍42
San Francisco Giants	80	81	.497	27½	46‍–‍35	34‍–‍46
San Diego Padres	71	91	.438	37	38‍–‍43	33‍–‍48
Atlanta Braves	67	94	.416	40½	37‍–‍43	30‍–‍51
Houston Astros	64	97	.398	43½	37‍–‍44	27‍–‍53

=== Record vs. opponents ===
1975 National League record Sources:
Team	ATL	CHC	CIN	HOU	LAD	MON	NYM	PHI	PIT	SD	SF	STL
Atlanta	—	5–7	3–15	12–6	8–10	8–4	4–8	5–7	4–8	7–11	8–9	3–9
Chicago	7–5	—	1–11	7–5	5–7	9–9	7–11	12–6	6–12	5–7	5–7	11–7
Cincinnati	15–3	11–1	—	13–5	8–10	8–4	8–4	7–5	6–6	11–7	13–5	8–4
Houston	6–12	5–7	5–13	—	6–12	8–4	4–8	6–6	6–5	9–9	5–13	4–8–1
Los Angeles	10–8	7–5	10–8	12–6	—	5–7	6–6	7–5	5–7	11–7	10–8	5–7
Montreal	4–8	9–9	4–8	4–8	7–5	—	10–8	7–11	7–11	7–5	5–7	11–7
New York	8–4	11–7	4–8	8–4	6–6	8–10	—	7–11	5–13	8–4	8–4	9–9
Philadelphia	7-5	6–12	5–7	6–6	5–7	11–7	11–7	—	11–7	7–5	7–5	10–8
Pittsburgh	8–4	12–6	6–6	5–6	7–5	11–7	13–5	7–11	—	8–4	5–7	10–8
San Diego	11–7	7–5	7–11	9–9	7–11	5–7	4–8	5–7	4–8	—	8–10	4–8
San Francisco	9–8	7–5	5–13	13–5	8–10	7–5	4–8	5–7	7–5	10–8	—	5–7
St. Louis	9–3	7–11	4–8	8–4–1	7–5	7–11	9–9	8–10	8–10	8–4	7–5	—

=== Opening Day starters ===
- Glenn Beckert
- Tito Fuentes
- Johnny Grubb
- Enzo Hernández
- Randy Hundley
- Randy Jones
- Willie McCovey
- Bobby Tolan
- Dave Winfield

=== Notable transactions ===
- April 7, 1975: Bill Laxton was released by the Padres.
- April 28, 1975: Glenn Beckert was released by the Padres.
- May 23, 1975: Chuck Hartenstein was signed as a free agent by the Padres.
- September 17, 1975: Gary Ross was traded by the Padres to the California Angels for Bobby Valentine and a player to be named later. The Angels completed the deal by sending Rudy Meoli to the Padres on November 4.

=== Roster ===
1975 San Diego Padres
Roster
Pitchers: 26 Rich Folkers; 21 Alan Foster; 14 Dave Freisleben; 34 Danny Frisella; 27 Bill Greif; 25 Larry Hardy; 40 Jerry Johnson; 35 Randy Jones; 24 Joe McIntosh; 36 Butch Metzger; 40 Sonny Siebert; 48 Dan Spillner; 22 Brent Strom; 37 Dave Tomlin	Catchers: 7 Bob Davis; 4 Randy Hundley; 16 Fred Kendall; 17 Jerry Moses; Infielders: 5 Bill Almon; 18 Glenn Beckert; 23 Tito Fuentes; 11 Enzo Hernández; 10 Dave Hilton; 18 Steve Huntz; 15 Mike Ivie; 8 Ted Kubiak; 44 Willie McCovey; 20 Dave Roberts; 30 Héctor Torres	Outfielders: 2 Johnny Grubb; 6 Don Hahn; 32 Gene Locklear; 6 John Scott; 13 Dick Sharon; 28 Bobby Tolan; 42 Jerry Turner; 3 Bobby Valentine; 31 Dave Winfield	Manager: 1 John McNamara; Coaches: 12 Jim Davenport (Third Base); 29 Tom Morgan (Pitching); 9 Dick Sisler (Hitting & First Base); 19 Whitey Wietelmann (Bullpen)

== Player stats ==
=== Batting ===
==== Starters by position ====
Note: Pos = Position; G = Games played; AB = At bats; H = Hits; Avg. = Batting average; HR = Home runs; RBI = Runs batted in

Pos	Player	G	AB	H	Avg.	HR	RBI
C	Fred Kendall	103	286	57	.199	0	24
1B	Willie McCovey	122	413	104	.252	23	68
2B	Tito Fuentes	146	565	158	.280	4	43
SS	Enzo Hernández	116	344	75	.218	0	19
3B	Mike Ivie	111	377	94	.249	8	46
LF	Bobby Tolan	147	506	129	.255	5	43
CF	Johnny Grubb	144	553	149	.269	4	38
RF	Dave Winfield	143	509	136	.267	15	76

==== Other batters ====
Note: G = Games played; AB = At bats; H = Hits; Avg. = Batting average; HR = Home runs; RBI = Runs batted in

Player	G	AB	H	Avg.	HR	RBI
Héctor Torres	112	352	91	.259	5	26
Gene Locklear	100	237	76	.321	5	27
Ted Kubiak	87	196	44	.224	0	14
Randy Hundley	74	180	37	.206	2	14
Dick Sharon	91	160	31	.194	4	20
Bob Davis	43	128	30	.234	0	7
Dave Roberts	33	113	32	.283	2	12
Steve Huntz	22	53	8	.151	0	4
Don Hahn	34	26	6	.231	0	3
Jerry Turner	11	22	6	.273	0	0
Jerry Moses	13	19	3	.158	0	1
Glenn Beckert	9	16	6	.375	0	0
Bobby Valentine	7	15	2	.133	1	1
Bill Almon	6	10	4	.400	0	0
John Scott	25	9	0	.000	0	0
Dave Hilton	4	8	0	.000	0	0

=== Pitching ===
= Indicates league leader

==== Starting pitchers ====
Note: G = Games pitched; IP = Innings pitched; W = Wins; L = Losses; ERA = Earned run average; SO = Strikeouts

Player	G	IP	W	L	ERA	SO
Randy Jones	37	285.0	20	12	2.24	103
Joe McIntosh	37	183.0	8	15	3.69	71
Dave Freisleben	36	181.0	5	14	4.28	77
Brent Strom	18	120.1	8	8	2.54	56
Sonny Siebert	6	26.2	3	2	4.39	10

==== Other pitchers ====
Note: G = Games pitched; IP = Innings pitched; W = Wins; L = Losses; ERA = Earned run average; SO = Strikeouts

Player	G	IP	W	L	ERA	SO
Dan Spillner	37	166.2	5	13	4.27	104
Rich Folkers	45	142.0	6	11	4.18	87
Jerry Johnson	21	54.0	3	1	5.17	18
Alan Foster	17	44.2	3	1	2.42	20

==== Relief pitchers ====
Note: G = Games pitched; W = Wins; L = Losses; SV = Saves; ERA = Earned run average; SO = Strikeouts

Player	G	W	L	SV	ERA	SO
Danny Frisella	65	1	6	9	3.13	67
Bill Greif	59	4	6	9	3.88	43
Dave Tomlin	67	4	2	1	3.25	48
Butch Metzger	4	1	0	0	7.71	6
Larry Hardy	3	0	0	0	13.50	3

== Awards and honors ==
- Randy Jones, The Sporting News NL Comeback Player of the Year honors
- Randy Jones, ERA Champion (2.24)

=== All-Stars ===
1975 Major League Baseball All-Star Game

- Randy Jones

== Farm system ==
Level	Team	League	Manager
AAA	Hawaii Islanders	Pacific Coast League	Roy Hartsfield
AA	Alexandria Aces	Texas League	Pat Corrales
A	Reno Silver Sox	California League	Harry Warner
A-Short Season	Walla Walla Padres	Northwest League	Cliff Ditto

LEAGUE CHAMPIONS: Hawaii, Reno

Reno affiliation shared with Minnesota Twins
