= 1973 San Diego Padres season =

1973 San Diego Padres
- League: National League
- Division: West
- Ballpark: San Diego Stadium
- City: San Diego, California
- Record: 60–102 (.370)
- Divisional place: 6th
- Owners: C. Arnholt Smith
- Managers: Don Zimmer
- Radio: KOGO (Jerry Coleman, Bob Chandler)

The 1973 San Diego Padres season was the fifth season in franchise history.

== Offseason ==
- December 27, 1972: Curt Blefary was released by the Padres.
- January 10, 1973: Dave Wehrmeister was drafted by the Padres in the 1st round (3rd pick) of the 1973 Major League Baseball draft.

== Regular season ==
=== Dave Winfield ===
Dave Winfield came to the Padres in 1973 from the University of Minnesota without having played a single game in the minor leagues. Winfield was also drafted by the Minnesota Vikings of the National Football League, the Atlanta Hawks of the National Basketball Association and the Utah Stars of the American Basketball Association. Winfield made his Major League Baseball debut on June 19 against the Houston Astros. Winfield had 4 at bats and 1 hit.

=== Season standings ===
NL West
Team	W	L	Pct.	GB	Home	Road
Cincinnati Reds	99	63	.611	—	50‍–‍31	49‍–‍32
Los Angeles Dodgers	95	66	.590	3½	50‍–‍31	45‍–‍35
San Francisco Giants	88	74	.543	11	47‍–‍34	41‍–‍40
Houston Astros	82	80	.506	17	41‍–‍40	41‍–‍40
Atlanta Braves	76	85	.472	22½	40‍–‍40	36‍–‍45
San Diego Padres	60	102	.370	39	31‍–‍50	29‍–‍52

=== Record vs. opponents ===
1973 National League record Sources:
Team	ATL	CHC	CIN	HOU	LAD	MON	NYM	PHI	PIT	SD	SF	STL
Atlanta	—	7–5	5–13	11–7	2–15–1	6–6	6–6	6–6	7–5	12–6	8–10	6–6
Chicago	5–7	—	8–4	6–6	5–7	9–9	10–7	10–8	6–12	7–5	2–10	9–9
Cincinnati	13–5	4–8	—	11–7	11–7	8–4	8–4	8–4	7–5	13–5	10–8	6–6
Houston	7–11	6–6	7–11	—	11–7	6–6	6–6	7–5	6–6	10–8	11–7	5–7
Los Angeles	15–2–1	7–5	7–11	7–11	—	7–5	7–5	9–3	10–2	9–9	9–9	8–4
Montreal	6–6	9–9	4–8	6–6	5–7	—	9–9	13–5	6–12	7–5	6–6	8–10
New York	6–6	7–10	4–8	6–6	5–7	9–9	—	9–9	13–5	8–4	5–7	10–8
Philadelphia	6–6	8–10	4–8	5–7	3–9	5–13	9–9	—	8–10	9–3	5–7	9–9
Pittsburgh	5–7	12–6	5–7	6–6	2–10	12–6	5–13	10–8	—	8–4	5–7	10–8
San Diego	6–12	5–7	5–13	8–10	9–9	5–7	4–8	3–9	4–8	—	7–11	4–8
San Francisco	10–8	10–2	8–10	7–11	9–9	6–6	7–5	7–5	7–5	11–7	—	6–6
St. Louis	6–6	9–9	6–6	7–5	4–8	10–8	8–10	9–9	8–10	8–4	6–6	—

=== Opening Day starters ===
- Nate Colbert
- Bob Davis
- Cito Gaston
- Johnny Grubb
- Enzo Hernández
- Dave Hilton
- Clay Kirby
- Leron Lee
- Dave Roberts

=== Notable transactions ===
- June 5, 1973: Dave Winfield was drafted by the San Diego Padres in the 1st round (4th pick) of the 1973 Major League Baseball draft.
- June 12, 1973: Fred Norman was traded by the Padres to the Cincinnati Reds for Gene Locklear and Mike Johnson.

=== Roster ===
1973 San Diego Padres
Roster
Pitchers: 22 Steve Arlin; 23 Mike Caldwell; 30 Mike Corkins; 27 Bill Greif; 35 Randy Jones; 43 Clay Kirby; 42 Bob Miller; 35 Fred Norman; 44 Vicente Romo; 33 Gary Ross; 42 Frank Snook; 47 Rich Troedson	Catchers: 28 Pat Corrales; 6 Bob Davis; 16 Fred Kendall; Infielders: 10 Dwain Anderson; 10 Dave Campbell; 17 Nate Colbert; 11 Enzo Hernández; 18 Dave Hilton; 6 Don Mason; 6 Rich Morales; 20 Dave Roberts; 30 Derrel Thomas	Outfielders: 21 Cito Gaston; 1 Johnny Grubb; 24 Leron Lee; 5 Gene Locklear; 8 Dave Marshall; 32 Jerry Morales; 14 Ivan Murrell; 31 Dave Winfield	Manager: 9 Don Zimmer; Coaches: 2 Dave Garcia (First Base); 45 Johnny Podres (Pitching); 4 Bob Skinner (Hitting & Third Base); 19 Whitey Wietelmann (Bullpen)

== Player stats ==
= Indicates team leader

=== Batting ===
==== Starters by position ====
Note: Pos = Position; G = Games played; AB = At bats; H = Hits; Avg. = Batting average; HR = Home runs; RBI = Runs batted in

Pos	Player	G	AB	H	Avg.	HR	RBI
C	Fred Kendall	145	507	143	.282	10	59
1B	Nate Colbert	145	529	153	.270	22	80
2B	Rich Morales	90	244	40	.164	0	16
SS	Derrel Thomas	113	404	96	.238	0	22
3B	Dave Roberts	127	479	137	.286	21	64
LF	Leron Lee	118	333	79	.237	3	30
CF	Johnny Grubb	113	389	121	.311	8	37
RF	Cito Gaston	133	476	119	.250	16	57

==== Other batters ====
Note: G = Games played; AB = At bats; H = Hits; Avg. = Batting average; HR = Home runs; RBI = Runs batted in

Player	G	AB	H	Avg.	HR	RBI
Jerry Morales	122	388	109	.281	9	34
Enzo Hernández	70	247	55	.223	0	9
Dave Hilton	70	234	46	.197	5	16
Ivan Murrell	93	210	48	.229	9	21
Gene Locklear	67	154	37	.240	3	25
Dave Winfield	56	141	39	.277	3	12
Dwain Anderson	53	107	13	.121	0	3
Dave Campbell	33	98	22	.224	0	8
Pat Corrales	29	72	15	.208	0	3
Dave Marshall	39	49	14	.286	0	4
Bob Davis	5	11	1	.091	0	0
Don Mason	8	8	0	.000	0	0

=== Pitching ===
==== Starting pitchers ====
Note: G = Games pitched; IP = Innings pitched; W = Wins; L = Losses; ERA = Earned run average; SO = Strikeouts

Player	G	IP	W	L	ERA	SO
Bill Greif	36	199.1	10	17	3.21	120
Clay Kirby	34	191.2	8	18	4.79	129
Steve Arlin	34	180.0	11	14	5.10	98
Randy Jones	20	139.2	7	6	3.16	77
Fred Norman	12	74.0	1	7	4.26	49

==== Other pitchers ====
Note: G = Games pitched; IP = Innings pitched; W = Wins; L = Losses; ERA = Earned run average; SO = Strikeouts

Player	G	IP	W	L	ERA	SO
Rich Troedson	50	152.1	7	9	4.25	81
Mike Caldwell	55	149.0	5	14	3.74	86
Mike Corkins	47	122.0	5	8	4.50	82

Mike Caldwell led the Padres in saves with 10.

==== Relief pitchers ====
Note: G = Games pitched; W = Wins; L = Losses; SV = Saves; ERA = Earned run average; SO = Strikeouts

Player	G	W	L	SV	ERA	SO
Gary Ross	58	4	4	0	5.42	44
Vicente Romo	49	2	3	7	3.70	51
Bob Miller	18	0	0	0	4.11	15
Frank Snook	18	0	2	1	3.62	13

== Award winners ==
1973 Major League Baseball All-Star Game

== Farm system ==
Level	Team	League	Manager
AAA	Hawaii Islanders	Pacific Coast League	Rocky Bridges, Warren Hacker and Roy Hartsfield
AA	Alexandria Aces	Texas League	Jackie Brandt
A-Short Season	Walla Walla Padres	Northwest League	Cliff Ditto

LEAGUE CHAMPIONS: Walla Walla
