= 1973 Caribbean Series =

1973 baseball tournament

The sixteenth edition of the Caribbean Series (Serie del Caribe) was played in 1973. It was held from February 1 through February 6 with the champions teams from Dominican Republic (Tigres del Licey), Mexico (Yaquis de Obregón), Puerto Rico (Cangrejeros de Santurce) and Venezuela (Leones del Caracas). The format consisted of 12 games, each team facing the other teams twice, and the games were played at UCV Stadium in Caracas, Venezuela. The Series was played to honor the memory of Roberto Clemente, who died on December 31, 1972, during a humanitarian mission to assist victims of the 1972 Nicaragua earthquake.

== Summary ==
The powerful Dominican Republic team, managed by Tommy Lasorda, captured the competition with a 5–1 record, with the only defeat coming from Venezuela in Game 4. The Dominicans hit a collective .329 average, committed only three errors, and outscored their rivals 44–19. Pedro Borbón (2-0) led the pitching staff, while OFs Jesús Alou and Manny Mota tied in the race for the batting title, with a .500 average (12-for-24). SS Bobby Valentine, who provided opportune hitting and a sharp defense, was named Series Most Valuable Player. The team also featured Ps Bruce Ellingsen, Lerrin LaGrow, Charlie Hough and Dick Tidrow; C Steve Yeager; IFs Jim Spencer (1B), Ted Martínez (2B) and Steve Garvey (3B), and OFs Elvio Jiménez and Von Joshua.

The Puerto Rico and Venezuela teams, managed by Frank Robinson and Ozzie Virgil respectively, were not rivals for the Dominicans and tied in second place with a 3–3 record.

Puerto Rico's victories came behind pitching efforts from Doyle Alexander, (2-0, 1.20 ERA, 13.0 IP) and Juan Pizarro (1-1, 5.25 ERA, 12.0 IP). Other significant players in the roster included Ps Lloyd Allen, Roger Moret, Bob Reynolds, Ramón Hernández and Mike Strahler; C Elrod Hendricks; IFs Tony Pérez (1B), Jerry DaVanon (2B), Ron Cey (3B) and Juan Beníquez (SS); Ofs Don Baylor (LF), José Cruz (CF) and Willie Crawford, and utilities Julio Gotay (IF) and Angel Mangual (OF).

Venezuela divided wins and losses against each team. RF César Tovar (.385 BA) and 1B Gonzalo Márquez (.381 BA) paced the offense, while Diego Seguí pitched a complete game, seven-hit shutout with 15 strikeouts. Other support came from P Milt Wilcox (1-1, 3.27 ERA), 3B Manny Trillo (.476 SLG, five RBI) and C Joe Ferguson (.423 SLG, five RBI). The rest of the roster included P Ed Acosta, OF Tony Armas, SS Bert Campaneris, P Reggie Cleveland, CF Víctor Davalillo, OF Bobby Darwin, 2B Gustavo Gil, C Dave Ricketts and P Ed Sprague, among others.

The Mexicans, with Dave Garcia at the helm, posted a 1–5 record and finished in last place. Their only victory came against Venezuela, 3–1, behind the combined pitching performance of the Romo brothers (Vicente and Enrique) and closer Al Hrabosky. Also in the roster were 1B Jim Campanis, Ps Maximino León and Rich Troedson, 3B Dave Hilton, and OF Matt Alexander.

Final standings
Club	W	L	W/L %	GB	Managers
Dominican Republic	5	1	.833	–	Tommy Lasorda
Puerto Rico	3	3	.500	2.0	Frank Robinson
Venezuela	3	3	.500	2.0	Ozzie Virgil
Mexico	1	5	.167	4.0	Dave Garcia

Individual leaders
Player/Club	Statistic
Jesús Alou / DOM; Manny Mota / DOM	Batting average	.500
Thirteen tied	Home runs	1
Jesús Alou / DOM; Steve Yeager / DOM	RBI	7
Jesús Alou / DOM	Runs	5
César Tovar / VEN	Hits	10
Five tied	Doubles	2
Three tied	Triples	1
Four tied	Stolen bases	1
Doyle Alexander / PRI; Pedro Borbón / DOM	Wins	2
Diego Seguí / VEN	Strikeouts	17
Diego Seguí / VEN	ERA	0.00
Al Hrabosky / MEX; Bob Reynolds / PRI	Saves	1
Pedro Borbón / DOM	Innings pitched	14 2/3
Awards
Bobby Valentine / DOM	Most Valuable Player
Tommy Lasorda / DOM	Manager

All-Star Team
Name/Club	Position
Steve Yeager / DOM	catcher
Gonzalo Márquez / VEN	first baseman
Gustavo Gil / VEN	second baseman
Steve Garvey / DOM	third baseman
Bobby Valentine / DOM	shortstop
Jesús Alou / DOM	left fielder
Manny Mota / DOM	center fielder
César Tovar / VEN	right fielder
Diego Seguí / VEN	RH pitcher
Juan Pizarro / PRI	LH pitcher
Tommy Lasorda / DOM	manager

=== Scoreboards ===
==== Game 1, February 1 ====
Team	1	2	3	4	5	6	7	8	9	R	H	E
Puerto Rico	0	2	0	0	0	0	0	0	0	2	10	1
Dominican Republic	2	1	1	3	0	1	0	0	X	8	13	0
WP: Pedro Borbón (1-0) LP: Juan Pizarro (0-1); Home runs: PRI: Willie Crawford (1); DOM: Steve Yeager (1)

==== Game 2, February 1 ====
Team	1	2	3	4	5	6	7	8	9	R	H	E
Venezuela	1	0	0	0	2	0	0	1	0	4	8	1
Mexico	0	0	0	0	0	0	0	0	0	0	5	2
WP: Milt Wilcox (1-0) LP: Rich Troedson (0-1); Home runs: VEN: Manny Trillo (1); MEX: None

==== Game 3, February 2 ====
Team	1	2	3	4	5	6	7	8	9	R	H	E
Mexico	0	0	0	0	0	0	0	2	0	2	11	0
Puerto Rico	0	1	1	0	0	1	0	0	X	3	7	1
WP: Doyle Alexander (1-0) LP: Al Hrabosky (0-1) Sv: Bob Reynolds (1); Home runs: MEX: None; PRI: Tony Pérez (1)

==== Game 4, February 2 ====
Team	1	2	3	4	5	6	7	8	9	R	H	E
Dominican Republic	0	0	2	0	0	0	0	0	0	2	7	1
Venezuela	0	1	3	0	2	0	0	0	X	6	12	1
WP: Reggie Cleveland (1-0) LP: Bruce Ellingsen (0-1); Home runs: DOM: None; VEN: Víctor Davalillo (1)

==== Game 5, February 3 ====
Team	1	2	3	4	5	6	7	8	9	R	H	E
Dominican Republic	2	0	0	0	0	0	1	5	0	8	12	2
Mexico	0	0	0	0	0	0	2	0	0	2	10	1
WP: Dick Tidrow (1-0) LP: Maximino León (0-1)

==== Game 6, February 3 ====
Team	1	2	3	4	5	6	7	8	9	R	H	E
Venezuela	0	0	0	1	0	1	0	0	0	2	7	1
Puerto Rico	0	0	0	0	0	0	0	0	0	0	7	1
WP: Diego Seguí (1-0) LP: Lloyd Allen (0-1); Home runs: VEN: Joe Ferguson (1); PRI: None

==== Game 7, February 4 ====
Team	1	2	3	4	5	6	7	8	9	R	H	E
Dominican Republic	0	0	1	2	2	0	1	1	2	9	15	1
Puerto Rico	0	0	0	0	0	1	0	1	0	2	6	1
WP: Lerrin LaGrow (1-0) LP: Roger Moret (0-1); Home runs: DOM: Jesús Alou (1); PRI: None

==== Game 8, February 4 ====
Team	1	2	3	4	5	6	7	8	9	R	H	E
Mexico	1	0	1	0	0	3	0	0	0	5	9	3
Venezuela	0	0	2	0	0	0	0	1	0	3	8	2
WP: Vicente Romo (1-0) LP: Luis Peñalver (0-1) Sv: Al Hrabosky (1)

==== Game 9, February 5 ====
Team	1	2	3	4	5	6	7	8	9	R	H	E
Puerto Rico	0	0	0	0	0	1	0	8	0	9	12	0
Mexico	0	0	0	1	0	1	0	0	0	2	8	1
WP: Juan Pizarro (1-1) LP: Rich Troedson (0-2); Home runs: PRI: Angel Mangual (1); MEX: Dave Hilton (1)

==== Game 10, February 5 ====
Team	1	2	3	4	5	6	7	8	9	R	H	E
Venezuela	0	0	0	1	1	2	1	0	0	5	13	5
Dominican Republic	0	4	3	0	0	0	0	2	X	9	13	0
WP: Pedro Borbón (2-0) LP: Milt Wilcox (1-1)

==== Game 11, February 6 ====
Team	1	2	3	4	5	6	7	8	9	R	H	E
Mexico	0	1	0	0	0	0	1	0	0	2	10	2
Dominican Republic	0	5	2	0	1	0	0	0	X	8	15	1
WP: Bruce Ellingsen (1-1) LP: Al Hrabosky (0-2); Home runs: MEX: None; DOM: Jim Spencer (1)

==== Game 12, February 6 ====
Team	1	2	3	4	5	6	7	8	9	R	H	E
Puerto Rico	3	2	1	0	1	1	0	0	0	8	10	1
Venezuela	0	0	0	0	0	0	0	0	0	0	4	1
WP: Doyle Alexander (2-0) LP: Milt Wilcox (1-2); Home runs: PRI: Fernando González (1), Elrod Hendricks (1); VEN: None

== See also ==
- Ballplayers who have played in the Series

== Sources ==
- Antero Núñez, José. Series del Caribe. Impresos Urbina, Caracas, Venezuela.
- Araujo Bojórquez, Alfonso. Series del Caribe: Narraciones y estadísticas, 1949-2001. Colegio de Bachilleres del Estado de Sinaloa, Mexico.
- Figueredo, Jorge S. Cuban Baseball: A Statistical History, 1878–1961. Macfarland & Co., United States.
- González Echevarría, Roberto. The Pride of Havana. Oxford University Express.
- Gutiérrez, Daniel. Enciclopedia del Béisbol en Venezuela, Caracas, Venezuela.
