= Dave Freisleben =

American baseball player (born 1951)

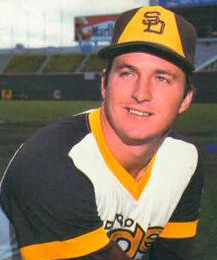
- Freisleben in 1978
- Pitcher
- Born: October 31, 1951 (age 74); Coraopolis, Pennsylvania, U.S.
- Batted: Right Threw: Right

MLB debut
- April 26, 1974, for the San Diego Padres

Last MLB appearance
- September 30, 1979, for the Toronto Blue Jays

MLB statistics
- Win–loss record: 34–60
- Earned run average: 4.30
- Strikeouts: 430
- Stats at Baseball Reference

Teams
- San Diego Padres (1974–1978); Cleveland Indians (1978); Toronto Blue Jays (1979)

David James Freisleben (born October 31, 1951) is an American former professional baseball pitcher. He played in Major League Baseball (MLB) for the San Diego Padres, Cleveland Indians, and Toronto Blue Jays.

== Texas League Pitcher of the Year ==
Freisleben was the quarterback of the Sam Rayburn High School football team as well as the star pitcher of their baseball team. Straight out of high school, Freisleben was drafted by the San Diego Padres in the fifth round of the 1971 Major League Baseball draft. With the Alexandria Aces in 1972, Dave went 17-9 with a 2.32 earned run average & 163 strikeouts to earn Texas League "Pitcher of the Year" honors. Freisleben quickly rose through the Padres' farm system, going 42-21 with a 2.69 ERA & 494 strikeouts.

== Rookie season ==
Freisleben modeled prototype "Washington Stars" road uniforms in publicity photos when the Padres appeared destined to move to Washington, D.C. for the 1974 season. The relocation fell through and Freisleben was called up to San Diego early in the 1974 season to join Bill Greif, Randy Jones & Dan Spillner in one of the best young starting rotations in the National League. Freisleben won his major league debut over Steve Carlton and the Philadelphia Phillies, 6-2.

Freisleben had two shutouts and six complete games on his way to nine victories his rookie season, but his most impressive performance came in a no decision against the Cincinnati Reds. Freisleben held Cincinnati's "Big Red Machine" scoreless through nine, however, the Padres were also blanked by Reds starter Clay Kirby. Whereas Kirby was lifted after nine, Freisleben remained in the game for 13 innings without allowing a run. Rusty Gerhardt replaced Freisleben in the fourteenth inning, and the Padres finally broke through against Pedro Borbon in the bottom of the inning for the 1-0 victory.

== Hard luck ==
Freisleben's first start of the 1975 season is arguably one of the most hard luck pitching performances in major league history. In the second inning, Freisleben induced a ground ball from Cincinnati Reds right fielder Ken Griffey that was misplayed by shortstop Enzo Hernandez. Fortunately, Freisleben was able to get around the error by his shortstop, and escaped the inning without a run scoring.

Freisleben was not so lucky in the fifth. Joe Morgan led off the fifth with a ground ball that was misplayed by first baseman Mike Ivie. Johnny Bench followed with a double, then Tony Perez grounded to third for the first out of the inning. Dave Concepcion then hit a ground ball to short. Hernandez fielded the ball cleanly, however, his throw sailed past Ivie at first, allowing Morgan to scores, and Bench to advance to third. Cesar Geronimo was then intentionally walked to load the bases. Griffey followed with what should have been a double play ball to second baseman Tito Fuentes, however, the Padres were only able to turn one, and another run scored. The following batter, John Vukovich, was intentionally walked in order to get to the pitcher, Don Gullett, however, Gullett singled, bringing in two more runs. Pete Rose then followed with a ground ball to second. An error by Fuentes loaded the bases instead of ending the inning. Joe Morgan then followed with a single that plated two more runs. Rich Folkers replaced Freisleben on the mound, and allowed a single to Bench that plated a seventh unearned run in the inning.

Freisleben earned back-to-back complete game victories over the Chicago Cubs on May 11 & 17 to improve to 3-3 on the season, but from there, his hard luck returned. Freisleben lost his next six decisions despite a decent 4.35 ERA over that stretch. For the season, Freisleben went 5-14 with a 4.28 ERA.

Freisleben actually started the 1976 season in the Pacific Coast League, but was back in the majors by the end of May. Freisleben shut out his opponent in each of his first two starts, and was named National League "Player of the Week." By the end of June, Freisleben was 6-1 with a 1.52 ERA. For the season, Dave was 10-13 with a 3.51 ERA, and earned the first save of his career.

Freisleben was not a great hitter, even for a pitcher. He did, however, have two career triples. One of which came against the New York Mets leading off the sixth inning of a scoreless ballgame on June 8, 1976. Freisleben came around to score the first run of the game when Enzo Hernandez followed with a triple of his own.

Injuries derailed Freisleben's 1977 season. After missing all of May and part of the month of June, Freisleben's record stood at 0-5 with a 7.04 ERA. Dave righted the ship, winning each of his next five decisions, and ended the season at 7-9. After getting off to a poor start in 1978 (0-3, 6.08 ERA), Freisleben was dealt to the Cleveland Indians for former teammate Bill Laxton.

Lou Brock tied & broke Ty Cobb's all-time stolen base record against Freisleben on August 29, 1977.

== Cleveland Indians ==
Freisleben's career in Cleveland got off to a rocky start. His first start against the Detroit Tigers, Freisleben was unable to retire any of the six batters he faced. Freisleben managed just one win (July 17 against the Seattle Mariners) his one season with the Tribe. After which, Freisleben was shipped off to the Toronto Blue Jays for a player to be named later.

== Toronto Blue Jays ==
Freisleben was used almost exclusively in relief in Toronto. Freisleben performed adequately in that role (2-2, 4.78 ERA) until a blown save against the Kansas City Royals on August 6. With the Jays leading 5-4, and runners on first & second with nobody out, Freisleben replaced staff ace Dave Stieb on the mound. By the time Freisleben was pulled in favor of Jesse Jefferson, five more runs had scored, and not a single out was recorded.

From there, manager Roy Hartsfield seemed to lose faith in Freisleben. Freisleben was relegated to "mop up duty." Freisleben was called out of the bullpen eleven times over the rest of the season, all losses, and most of them out of reach for the team that went on to lose 109 games.

Freisleben was released at the end of the season, and attended Spring training with the California Angels in 1980, but failed to make the team.

== Career stats ==
W	L	Pct	ERA	G	GS	GF	SHO	S	IP	H	ER	R	HR	BB	K	WP	HBP	BAA	Fld%	Avg.
34	60	.362	4.30	202	121	37	6	4	865.1	897	413	477	67	430	430	45	25	.209	.957	.141

After retiring as a player, Freisleben coached in the minors for a couple of seasons in the Texas Rangers organization. Freisleben then moved on to become a saltwater fishing guide along Galveston Bay near his home in San Leon, Texas.
