= Brian Ostrosser =

Canadian baseball player (born 1949)

- Shortstop
- Born: June 17, 1949 (age 77); Hamilton, Ontario, Canada
- Batted: Left Threw: Right

MLB debut
- August 5, 1973, for the New York Mets

Last MLB appearance
- August 13, 1973, for the New York Mets

MLB statistics
- Games: 4
- Plate appearances: 5
- Hits: 0
- Stats at Baseball Reference

Teams
- New York Mets (1973)

Brian Leonard Ostrosser (born June 17, 1949) is a Canadian former Major League Baseball shortstop who appeared in four games for the New York Mets in 1973 when injuries to several players left the team short of infielders.

He had a 1.000 fielding percentage fielding 5 chances without an error. Although the Mets won the National League pennant in 1973 he was not on the postseason roster. He is one of the few Canadians to have played for the Mets.

In 1974 he was traded to the Cleveland Indians for Dwain Anderson, but never played a Major League game for the Indians.

== Baseball career ==
Ostrosser played Little League baseball in Stoney Creek, Ontario, where his team won the Ontario Little League title, losing the Canadian title to Montreal. He was signed to the Mets by scout Joe Sartorio in 1969.

Ostrosser started his professional career in 1970, playing with both the Rookie League Marion Mets and the Class A Pompano Beach Mets that year. He spent the 1971 season with Pompano Beach, and was promoted to the Class AA Memphis Blues of the Texas League in 1972. As Memphis' starting shortstop Ostrosser had a .262 batting average in 470 at bats. He only had 21 extra base hits for a .323 slugging percentage but his 71 walks produced a solid .370 on-base percentage. He led Texas League shortstops in fielding in 1972, and developed a reputation as an outstanding defensive shortstop.

He played for Class AAA Tidewater Tides briefly in 1972 and most of 1973. Although he started the 1973 season with Tidewater, he was not able to play until May due to an emergency operation to remove his appendix during spring training. With Tidewater in 1973 Ostrosser had a batting average of .230 in 283 at-bats. His slugging percentage was just .297 but again a large number of walks (47 in this case) produced a solid on-base percentage of .354.

It was during the 1973 that Ostrosser was briefly called up to the New York Mets to replace injured Met shortstop Bud Harrelson. He made his major league debut against the St. Louis Cardinals on August 5, 1973, going 0 for 2, striking out twice. He also played two games against the San Francisco Giants before his final Major League game on August 13, 1973 against the San Diego Padres. He did not get a hit in any of the 5 at-bats he received during his 4-game stint with the Mets. As of 2009, he was one of six Canadians to have played for the Mets, and was the last Canadian to play for the Mets until Jason Bay joined the team in 2009. As of the beginning of 1973, he was one of just four Canadians in the National League, and the only Canadian non-pitcher.

In 1974 Ostrosser played again for Tidewater but had a batting average of just .192 in 172 at-bats with no home runs. Even another impressive walk total of 32 relative to his at bats brought his on-base percentage only up to .332. After being traded to the Cleveland Indians in exchange for Dwain Anderson on June 21, 1974, Ostrosser played for the Oklahoma City 89ers. There he played 59 games at third base and only 11 games at shortstop, since the 89ers used future Major Leaguer Tom McMillan as their regular shortstop. He batted .261 for the 89ers in 1974 with a slugging percentage of .279 and an on-base percentage of .332. In 1975, still with the 89ers, he played just 63 games, mostly at third base, where he batted just .202 with a slugging percentage of .230 and an on-base percentage of .344, ending his career.

== Softball career ==
During the early 1980s, Ostrosser represented Canada on the national softball team. In 1980, Ostrosser was on Canada's World's men's softball championship team.
