= Frank Snook =

American baseball player (born 1949)

- Pitcher
- Born: March 28, 1949 (age 77); Somerville, New Jersey, U.S.
- Batted: Right Threw: Right

MLB debut
- July 13, 1973, for the San Diego Padres

Last MLB appearance
- September 29, 1973, for the San Diego Padres

MLB statistics
- Win–loss record: 0–2
- Earned run average: 3.62
- Strikeouts: 13
- Stats at Baseball Reference

Teams
- San Diego Padres (1973)

Frank Walter Snook (born March 28, 1949) is a former relief pitcher in Major League Baseball who played for the San Diego Padres in its 1973 season. Listed at 6' 2", 180 lb., Snook batted and threw right-handed.

Born in Somerville, New Jersey, Snook attended Hunterdon Central Regional High School.

Snook never won a game in MLB but did pick up one save. It occurred on September 8, 1973 during an extra innings victory over the rival Los Angeles Dodgers.
