= Bruce Ellingsen =

American baseball player (born 1949)

- Pitcher
- Born: April 26, 1949 (age 77); Pocatello, Idaho, U.S.
- Batted: Left Threw: Left

MLB debut
- July 4, 1974, for the Cleveland Indians

Last MLB appearance
- September 28, 1974, for the Cleveland Indians

MLB statistics
- Win–loss record: 1–1
- Earned run average: 3.16
- Innings pitched: 42
- Stats at Baseball Reference

Teams
- Cleveland Indians (1974)

Harold Bruce Ellingsen (born April 26, 1949) is an American former professional baseball player. In Major League Baseball, the left-handed pitcher worked in 16 games, including two starting assignments for the 1974 Cleveland Indians. Originally drafted by the Los Angeles Dodgers in 1967, Ellingsen stood 6 feet (1.8 m) tall and weighed 180 pounds (82 kg).

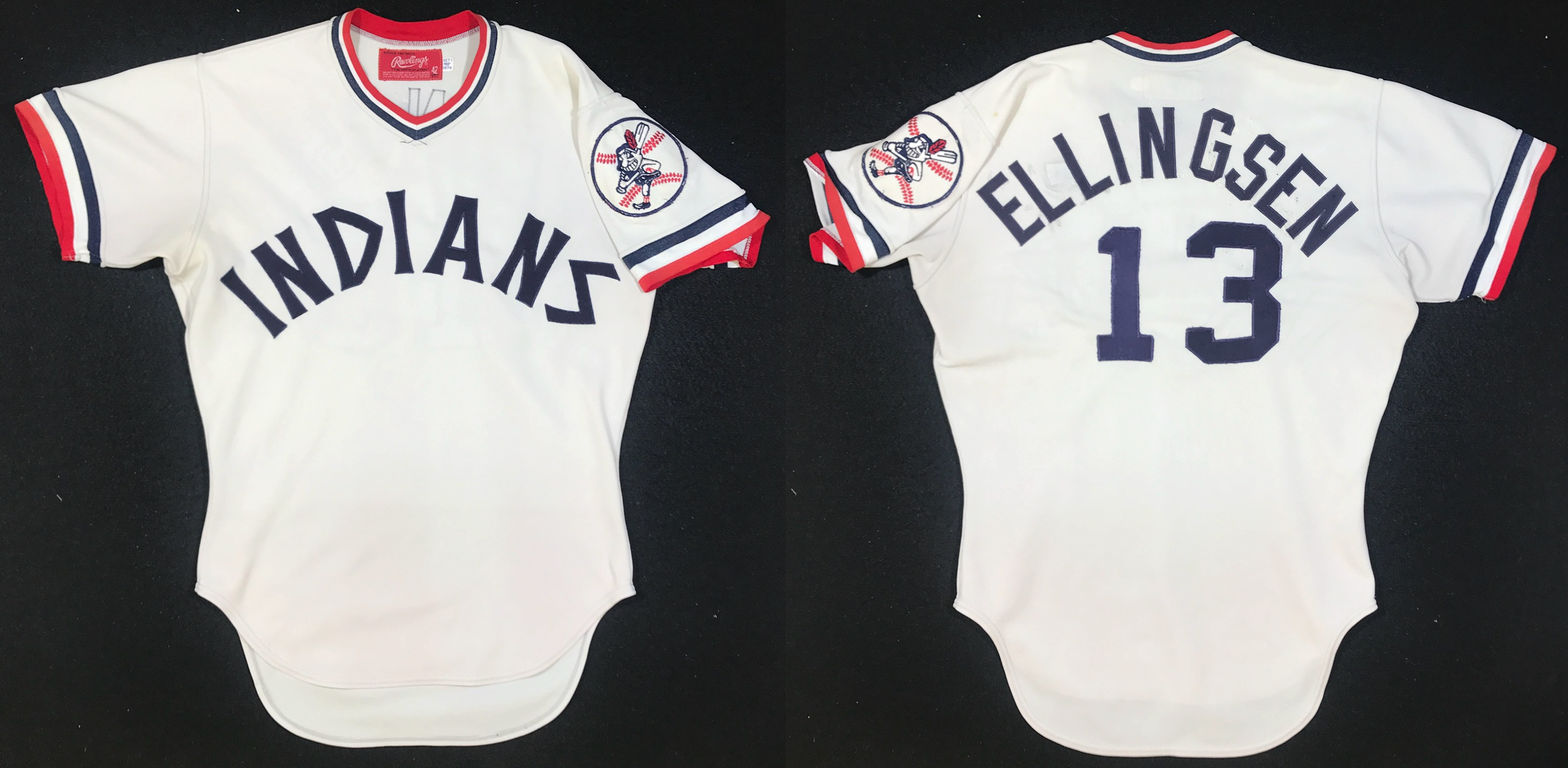
1974 Cleveland Indians #13 Bruce Ellingsen game worn home jersey

Ellingsen spent six full seasons in the Dodgers' farm system before he was acquired by the Indians on April 3, 1974, in an ultimately one-sided transaction. For Ellingsen, the Indians gave up Pedro Guerrero, then a 17-year-old with one year of professional experience with the Rookie-classification Gulf Coast Indians. Guerrero would go on to play eleven seasons for the Dodgers (and 15 in all in the Major Leagues), slug 215 home runs, bat an even .300, and be selected to five National League All-Star teams.

Ellingsen began the 1974 season with the Triple-A Oklahoma City 89ers, but was recalled in July. His final two appearances in September were as a starting pitcher against the New York Yankees. In the first, on September 22 at Shea Stadium, he went seven innings and surrendered only six hits, but lost a pitchers' duel to the Yankees' Pat Dobson 2–1 when he gave up a sixth-inning home run to Bobby Murcer. In his second start, six days later at Cleveland Stadium, he gave up four hits and four earned runs in 4 2/3 innings, but did not factor in the decision in a 9–7 Cleveland loss. Ellingsen then returned to minor league baseball in 1975 and retired from baseball following that season.

In 42 major league innings pitched, Ellingsen allowed 45 hits, 17 bases on balls and five home runs. He struck out 16.
