= Héctor Torres =

Mexican baseball player (born 1945)

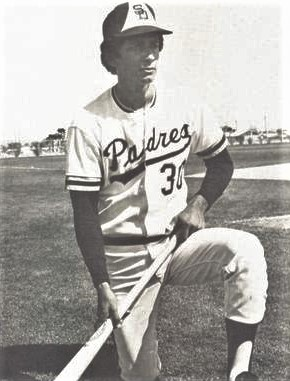
- Shortstop
- Born: September 16, 1945 (age 80); Monterrey, Nuevo León, Mexico
- Batted: Right Threw: Right

MLB debut
- April 10, 1968, for the Houston Astros

Last MLB appearance
- October 2, 1977, for the Toronto Blue Jays

MLB statistics
- Batting average: .216
- Home runs: 18
- Runs batted in: 115
- Stats at Baseball Reference

Teams
- Houston Astros (1968–1970); Chicago Cubs (1971); Montreal Expos (1972); Houston Astros (1973); San Diego Padres (1975–1976); Toronto Blue Jays (1977)

Héctor Epitacio Torres Marroquin (born September 16, 1945) is a Mexican former Major League Baseball shortstop. Nicknamed "La Malita" in his native Mexico, he played all or parts of nine seasons in the majors, between 1968 and 1977, with the Houston Astros, Chicago Cubs, Montreal Expos, San Diego Padres and Toronto Blue Jays.

== Early years ==
Torres played in the 1958 Little League World Series as a member of the championship team, Industrial Little League of Monterrey, Nuevo León, Mexico.

== Major League career ==
=== Houston Astros (1968–1970) ===
Torres was originally signed as an amateur free agent by the San Francisco Giants on March 25, 1962. On April 6, 1966, he was traded by the Giants to the California Angels for Dave Marshall. On November 27, 1967, the Angels sent Torres to the Houston Astros to complete an earlier deal in which Houston sent Jim Weaver to California for future considerations.

Torres made his Major League Baseball debut on April 10, 1968 as the Houston Astros' opening day shortstop, going 0 for 3 against the Pittsburgh Pirates. On April 11, he recorded his first career hit, an RBI single off Philadelphia Phillies pitcher Larry Jackson. Torres hit his first career home run on August 13 against Jeff James of the Philadelphia Phillies. Overall, Torres appeared in 128 games, batting .223 with 1 HR and 24 RBI.

Torres struggled and saw very little playing time with Houston in 1969, hitting .159 with 1 HR and 8 RBI in 34 games with the Astros.

In 1970, he played in 31 games with Houston, hitting .246 with 0 HR and 5 RBI. On October 2, the Astros traded Torres to the Chicago Cubs for Roger Metzger.

=== Chicago Cubs (1971) ===
Torres played in only 31 games with the Chicago Cubs in the 1971 season, as he had a .224 batting average with 0 HR and 2 RBI. The Cubs traded Torres and Hal Breeden to the Montreal Expos for Dan McGinn.

=== Montreal Expos (1972) ===
Torres saw increased playing time with the Montreal Expos in 1972, appearing in 83 games, the most games he had appeared in since his rookie season in 1968. He struggled offensively, batting .155, with 2 HR and 7 RBI. On April 4, 1973, the Houston Astros purchased Torres from the Expos.

=== Houston Astros (1973) ===
Torres returned to the Houston Astros for the 1973 season, but, in 38 games, he batted .091 with 0 HR and 2 RBI. He was dealt to the Chicago White Sox on October 26, 1973 in a transaction which was completed when Dan Neumeier was sent to the Astros 5 1/2 weeks later on December 4.

=== San Diego Padres (1975–1976) ===
Torres spent the entire 1974 season with the Hawaii Islanders of the Pacific Coast League. On April 3, 1975, the Padres acquired Torres when he was purchased by the San Diego Padres from the Chicago White Sox. In 1975, he appeared in 112 games with San Diego, hitting .259 with 5 HR and 26 RBI.

He struggled offensively in 1976, as in 74 games, his batting average dropped to .195 with 4 HR and 15 RBI with San Diego. On December 8, the Padres sent Torres, Johnny Grubb and Fred Kendall to the Cleveland Indians for George Hendrick.

=== Toronto Blue Jays (1977) ===
The Toronto Blue Jays acquired Torres from the Cleveland Indians on March 29, 1977. He was named the Blue Jays' opening day shortstop in their first ever game on April 7 and became the first player to appear with both Canada-based Major League teams, as he had a hit in two at-bats in the Blue Jays 9-5 victory over the Chicago White Sox. On June 27, 1977, he hit the first grand slam home run in Toronto Blue Jay history off Ron Guidry of the New York Yankees, in the 5th inning with two outs, at Exhibition Stadium in Toronto in an eventual 7-6 Blue Jays victory. In 94 games with Toronto, he hit .241 with 5 HR and 26 RBI. On March 27, 1978, the Blue Jays released Torres.

He spent the 1978 season with the Syracuse Chiefs and Columbus Clippers of the International League.

=== Career totals ===
In 622 career games, Torres collected 375 hits, had a .216 career batting average with 18 HR and 115 RBI.

== Managing career ==
=== Florence Blue Jays (1985–1986) ===
Torres managed the Class-A Florence Blue Jays of the South Atlantic League in both 1985 and 1986, leading the Blue Jays to the league title in the 1985 season. Overall, in two seasons, he led Florence to a 138-131 record.

=== Syracuse Chiefs (1995) ===
Torres managed the Syracuse Chiefs of the International League in 1995, the Toronto Blue Jays AAA affiliate. The Chiefs finished the year with a 59-82 record.

=== Arizona League Brewers (2003) ===
Torres managed the Brewers of the Arizona League in 2003, but the team struggled to a record of 18-37.

=== Sultanes de Monterrey (2005) ===
Torres managed the Sultanes de Monterrey of the Mexican League in 2005, leading the club to a 56-50 record. However, the club failed to reach the playoffs.

== See also ==
- Houston Astros award winners and league leaders
