= Dick Sharon =

American baseball player (born 1950)

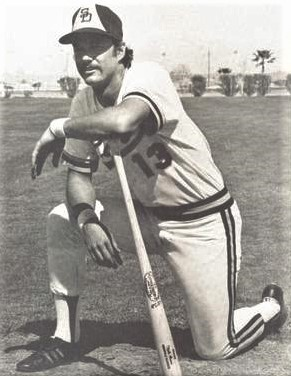
- Outfielder
- Born: April 15, 1950 (age 76); San Mateo, California, U.S.
- Batted: Right Threw: Right

MLB debut
- May 13, 1973, for the Detroit Tigers

Last MLB appearance
- September 28, 1975, for the San Diego Padres

MLB statistics
- Batting average: .218
- Home runs: 13
- Runs batted in: 46
- Stats at Baseball Reference

Teams
- Detroit Tigers (1973–1974); San Diego Padres (1975)

Richard Louis Sharon (born April 15, 1950) is an American former professional baseball player. He played in Major League Baseball as an outfielder from 1973 to 1975 for the Detroit Tigers and the San Diego Padres.

== Baseball career ==
Sharon was born in San Mateo, California, and is Jewish. He graduated from Sequoia High School, in Redwood City, California.

Sharon was a first round pick in the 1968 Major League Baseball draft, taken at No. 9 by the Pittsburgh Pirates. In 1970, he was 3rd in the Carolina League in RBIs, tied for third in home runs (22), 4th in runs (78), 6th in slugging percentage (.457), and tied for 7th in triples (5). He was traded from the Pirates to the Tigers for Norm McRae and Jim Foor at the Winter Meetings on November 27, 1972.

He broke into the major leagues at age 23 with the Detroit Tigers, on May 13, 1973. He was voted the team's Rookie of the Year. In 1974, he earned a peak salary of $19,000 with the Tigers. He along with Ed Brinkman and Bob Strampe were dealt from the Tigers to the San Diego Padres for Nate Colbert in a three-team deal on November 18, 1974, that involved Brinkman also being sent to the St. Louis Cardinals for Sonny Siebert, Alan Foster and Rich Folkers. Danny Breeden went from the Padres to the Cardinals to subsequently complete the transactions. Sharon played his last major league game with the Padres on September 28, 1975, three weeks before he was traded to the Cardinals for Willie Davis on October 20.
