= Larry Hardy (baseball) =

American baseball player (born 1948)

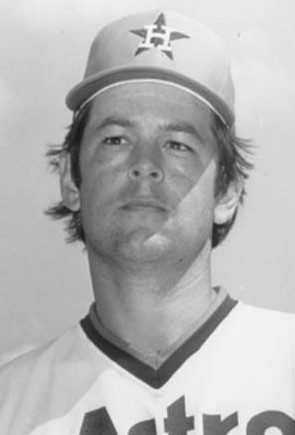
- Hardy in 1976
- Pitcher
- Born: January 10, 1948 (age 77); Goose Creek, Texas, U.S.
- Batted: Right Threw: Right

MLB debut
- April 28, 1974, for the San Diego Padres

Last MLB appearance
- May 16, 1976, for the Houston Astros

MLB statistics
- Win–loss record: 9–4
- Earned run average: 5.29
- Strikeouts: 70
- Stats at Baseball Reference

Teams
- San Diego Padres (1974–1975); Houston Astros (1976)

Howard Lawrence Hardy (born January 10, 1948) is an American former pitcher, coach and manager in professional baseball. Hardy threw and batted right-handed, stood 5 feet 10 inches (1.78 m) tall and weighed 180 pounds (82 kg) in his playing days.

Hardy attended Bellaire High School (Texas), and graduated from the University of Texas at Austin with a degree in business administration. Selected in the 23rd round of the 1970 amateur draft by the San Diego Padres, he reached Major League Baseball with the 1974 Padres, appearing in 76 games as a rookie, all but one of them as a relief pitcher, winning nine games, saving two, and losing four. He would appear in only 18 more MLB games in 1975–1976, with the Padres and Houston Astros, and spend the rest of his playing career at the Triple-A level of minor league baseball. He had been traded along with Joe McIntosh from the Padres to the Astros for Doug Rader on December 11, 1975. In his MLB career, he posted a career earned run average of 5.29 in 94 games to accompany his 9–4 (.692) record.

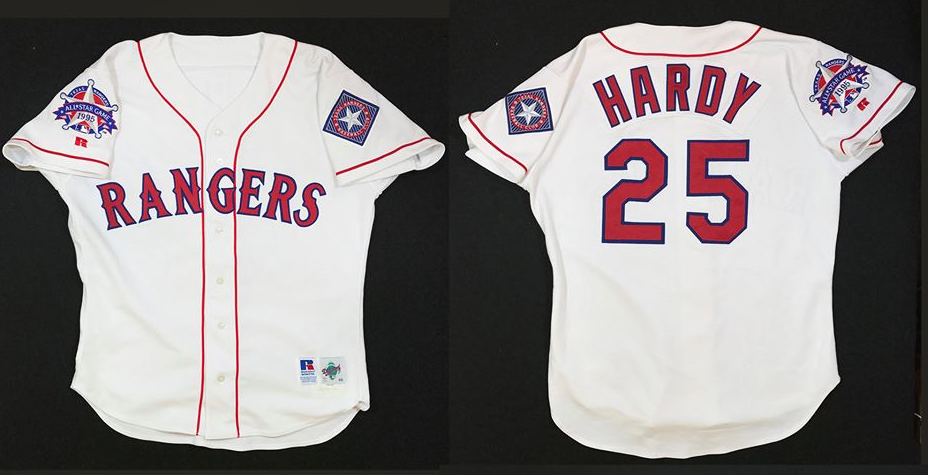
1995 Texas Rangers #25 Larry Hardy game worn home jersey

Hardy's coaching career began in 1978 as the pitching coach of the Charleston Charlies of the Triple-A International League, then Houston's top farm club. He switched to the Toronto Blue Jays' system in 1980 and served as a manager at the Double-A level as well as a minor league instructor.

After coaching in the San Francisco Giants' organization, Hardy returned to Major League Baseball as a coach with the Texas Rangers where he was a member of manager Johnny Oates' coaching staff from 1995 through 2001.
