= Rich Troedson =

American baseball player (born 1950)

- Pitcher
- Born: May 1, 1950 (age 76); Palo Alto, California, U.S.
- Batted: Left Threw: Left

MLB debut
- April 9, 1973, for the San Diego Padres

Last MLB appearance
- May 16, 1974, for the San Diego Padres

MLB statistics
- Win–loss record: 8–10
- Earned run average: 4.74
- Strikeouts: 92
- Stats at Baseball Reference

Teams
- San Diego Padres (1973–1974)
Medals
Men's baseball
Representing United States
Amateur World Series
Silver medal – second place	1970 Cartagena	Team

Richard LaMonte Troedson (born May 1, 1950) is an American former pitcher in Major League Baseball who played from 1973 through 1974 for the San Diego Padres. Listed at 6 feet 1 inch (1.85 m), 170 pounds (77 kg), Troedson batted and threw left-handed. He was selected by the Padres in the 1st round (6th pick) of the 1972 out of Santa Clara University.

In a two-season career, Troedson posted an 8–10 record with a 4.74 earned run average in 65 appearances, including 19 starts, two complete games and two saves, giving up 90 earned runs on 191 hits and 67 walks while striking out 92 in 171.0 innings of work.

== See also ==
- 1973 San Diego Padres season
- 1974 San Diego Padres season
