= Dwain Anderson =

American baseball player (born 1947)

- Shortstop
- Born: November 23, 1947 (age 78); Oakland, California, U.S.
- Batted: Right Threw: Right

MLB debut
- September 3, 1971, for the Oakland Athletics

Last MLB appearance
- May 28, 1974, for the Cleveland Indians

MLB statistics
- Batting average: .203
- Home runs: 1
- Runs batted in: 14
- Stats at Baseball Reference

Teams
- Oakland Athletics (1971–1972); St. Louis Cardinals (1972–1973); San Diego Padres (1973); Cleveland Indians (1974)

Career highlights and awards
- Topps All-Star Rookie Team (1972)

Dwain Cleaven Anderson (born November 23, 1947) is an American former professional baseball shortstop.

== Oakland A's ==
The El Cerrito High School standout signed as an amateur free agent with the Kansas City A's in 1965 at just seventeen years old. He batted .249 with 31 home runs and 250 runs batted in over seven seasons in Athletics' farm system to earn a September call-up in 1971.

Anderson made his major league debut in the second game of a September 3 doubleheader against the Minnesota Twins. In his second at bat, he singled off Ray Corbin, and came around to score Oakland's only run of the game. On September 18, Anderson's ninth inning triple broke a 2–2 tie to lead his A's to a 4–2 victory over the Milwaukee Brewers.

He started the following season back in the minors, but an injury to second baseman Dick Green led to a call-up in early May. He appeared in three games, and was hitless in seven at bats. On May 15, 1972, he was traded to the St. Louis Cardinals for relief pitcher Don Shaw.

== St. Louis Cardinals ==
Anderson's career with the Cards began mostly as a pinch hitter and late inning defensive replacement for aging shortstop Dal Maxvill. As the season progressed, and Anderson's batting average hovered around .300, Maxvill was dealt to Anderson's former club, the A's. Shortly afterwards, Anderson hit his only major league home run off the New York Mets' Bob Rauch, however, just over a week later, Anderson suffered a season ending injury. He ended the season batting .267, and was named to the Topps All-Star Rookie Team.

He entered Spring training 1973 expecting to battle Mike Tyson for the starting shortstop job, but a poor Spring relegated him to backup utility infielder. He appeared in eighteen games with the Cardinals, almost exclusively as a pinch hitter, and batted just .118. Having also become something of a defensive liability, Anderson began seeing less and less playing time, and on June 7 he was traded to the San Diego Padres for Dave Campbell.

== San Diego Padres ==
The highlight of his Padres career came on July 8, when his eighth inning squeeze bunt drove in Dave Roberts with the winning run over the Chicago Cubs, however, he batted just .149 up to that point, and soon saw his playing time in San Diego drop as well. After the season, he was traded to the Cleveland Indians for Lou Camilli.

== Cleveland Indians ==
Anderson appeared in two games for the Indians, but spent most of his stay with the organization with the triple A Oklahoma City 89ers. On June 21, 1974, he was traded to the New York Mets for Brian Ostrosser, however, he never appeared in a major league game for the Mets. He batted .264 with two home runs and fourteen RBIs for the triple A Tidewater Tides before retiring.

He played 149 games in Major League Baseball (MLB) from 1971 to 1974 for the Oakland Athletics (1971–1972), St. Louis Cardinals (1972–1973), San Diego Padres (1973), and Cleveland Indians (1974).
