= Bernie Williams (1970s outfielder) =

American baseball player (born 1948)

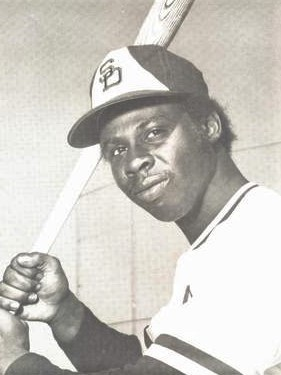
- Left fielder
- Born: October 8, 1948 (age 77); Alameda, California, U.S.
- Batted: Right Threw: Right

Professional debut
- MLB: September 7, 1970, for the San Francisco Giants
- NPB: April 5, 1975, for the Hankyu Braves

Last appearance
- MLB: May 12, 1974, for the San Diego Padres
- NPB: October 10, 1980, for the Hankyu Braves

MLB statistics
- Batting average: .192
- Home runs: 4
- Runs batted in: 15

NPB statistics
- Batting average: .258
- Home runs: 96
- Runs batted in: 294
- Stats at Baseball Reference

Teams
- San Francisco Giants (1970–1972); San Diego Padres (1974); Hankyu Braves (1975–1980)

Career highlights and awards
- Pacific League All-Star (1976)

Bernard Williams (born October 8, 1948) is an American former professional baseball left fielder, who played in Major League Baseball (MLB) for the San Francisco Giants (1970–1972) and San Diego Padres (1974).

Williams played in a total of 102 major league games in parts of four seasons, batting .192, with four home runs and 15 runs batted in (RBI), in 172 at bats. In addition to his appearances in the outfield, he was often used as a pinch hitter. In his MLB career, he never came close to achieving the success which he had experienced in Minor League Baseball (MiLB). Of his four big league home runs, two of them were pinch hits. After a campaign batting .313 at Triple-A Phoenix, he was traded along with Willie McCovey from the Giants to the Padres for Mike Caldwell on October 25, 1973.

After his major league career, Williams found much more success in Japan, playing for the Hankyu Braves of Nippon Professional Baseball (NPB). In six seasons there (1975–1980), he batted .258, with 96 home runs, and 294 RBI. Williams was selected to Japan’s Pacific League All-Star team in 1976.
