= Dave Marshall (baseball) =

American baseball player (1943–2019)

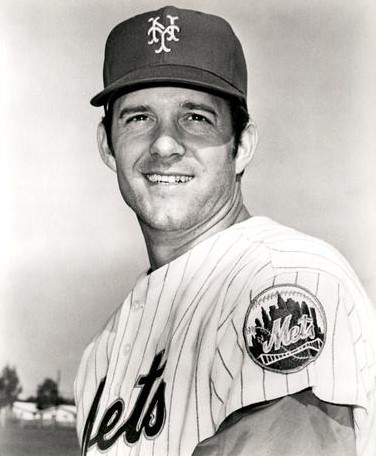
- Outfielder
- Born: January 14, 1943; Artesia, California, U.S.
- Died: June 6, 2019 (aged 76); Lakewood, California, U.S.
- Batted: Left Threw: Right

MLB debut
- September 7, 1967, for the San Francisco Giants

Last MLB appearance
- June 22, 1973, for the San Diego Padres

MLB statistics
- Batting average: .246
- Home runs: 16
- Runs batted in: 114
- Stats at Baseball Reference

Teams
- San Francisco Giants (1967–1969); New York Mets (1970–1972); San Diego Padres (1973)

Career highlights and awards
- Topps All-Star Rookie Team (1968)

David Lewis Marshall (January 14, 1943 – June 6, 2019) was an American Major League Baseball outfielder with the San Francisco Giants, New York Mets and San Diego Padres.

== Early years ==
Born in Artesia, California, Marshall threw right handed, batted left handed, and was listed as 6 feet 1 inch (1.85 m) tall and 182 pounds (83 kg). After graduating from Lakewood High School, he attended College of the Sequoias and Long Beach State University before signing with the Los Angeles Angels as an amateur free agent in 1963. At the end of his first season of professional baseball, he suffering a torn rotator cuff in his right shoulder playing winter ball with the San Jose Bees.

He batted .252 with 23 home runs and 166 runs batted in over three seasons in the Angels' farm system when he was dealt to the San Francisco Giants for fellow minor leaguer Héctor Torres at the start of the 1966 season.

== San Francisco Giants ==
Marshall appeared in one game as a pinch runner in 1967 before winning a job as a back up corner outfielder out of Spring training 1968. After a few pinch hitting appearances, Marshall went 3-for-5 with two runs scored and an RBI in his first start to lead the Giants to a 7-0 victory over the Atlanta Braves.

Marshall batted .264 with just one home run (off the St. Louis Cardinals' Ray Washburn) and sixteen RBIs his rookie season. He and teammate Bobby Bonds were named to the Topps All-Star Rookie Team's outfield. Torres, now with the Houston Astros, was its shortstop.

In 1969, he shifted into a lefty/righty platoon with Jim Ray Hart and Ken Henderson in left field. Marshall was dealt along with Ray Sadecki from the Giants to the New York Mets for Bob Heise and Jim Gosger on December 12, 1969.

== New York Mets ==
In his first at bat against his former franchise, Marshall hit a grand slam off Giants ace Gaylord Perry on his way to a career high six home runs his first season as a Met.

He hit a second career grand slam off the Astros' George Culver the following season. For his career, Marshall batted .333 with the two home runs and 29 RBIs with the bases loaded.

== San Diego Padres ==
Following the 1972 season, the Mets dealt Marshall to the San Diego Padres for pitcher Al Severinsen. He batted .286 with no home runs and four RBIs in very limited playing time with the Padres. He finished out the 1973 season with the triple A Hawaii Islanders, then was sold to the Chicago White Sox. He retired shortly afterwards, never appearing in a game at any level with the Chisox.

== Career statistics ==
Games	PA	AB	Runs	Hits	2B	3B	HR	RBI	SB	BB	SO	HBP	Avg.	OBP	Slg.	Fld%
490	1211	1049	123	258	41	4	16	114	13	133	239	10	.246	.333	.338	.966

== After baseball career ==
After retiring, Marshall owned three very successful taverns in Manhattan– Marshall’s, Oasis and Rascal’s. He returned to Southern California in 1984, and bought Nino's in Commerce, California.

Marshall died June 6, 2019, less than 48 hours after his wife died.
