= Steve Huntz =

American baseball player (born 1945)

- Infielder
- Born: December 3, 1945 (age 80); Cleveland, Ohio, U.S.
- Batted: Right Threw: Right

MLB debut
- September 19, 1967, for the St. Louis Cardinals

Last MLB appearance
- June 4, 1975, for the San Diego Padres

MLB statistics
- Batting average: .206
- Home runs: 16
- Runs batted in: 60
- Stats at Baseball Reference

Teams
- St. Louis Cardinals (1967, 1969); San Diego Padres (1970); Chicago White Sox (1971); San Diego Padres (1975)

Stephen Michael Huntz (born December 3, 1945) is an American former professional baseball player who played infield in the Major Leagues between 1967 and 1975 for the St. Louis Cardinals, Chicago White Sox and San Diego Padres. Huntz threw and batted right-handed, stood 6 feet 1 inch (1.85 m) tall and weighed 204 pounds (93 kg). He attended Villanova University.

Huntz' professional career extended for 13 seasons (1964; 1966–1977), and he played more than 1,000 games at the Triple-A level of minor league baseball — mostly in the Pacific Coast League. The bulk of his Major League playing time came as a utility infielder for the 1969 Cardinals and the 1970 Padres. He was traded along with Tommy John from the White Sox to the Los Angeles Dodgers for Dick Allen at the Winter Meetings on December 2, 1971. Huntz played exclusively for the Dodgers' Albuquerque Dukes PCL team for two seasons, but was eventually able to return to the Majors and San Diego for one last stint with the Padres in 1975.

Altogether, Huntz appeared in 237 Major League games. His 131 hits included 19 doubles, one triple and 16 home runs.

Huntz became father to daughter Erin, world renowned nurse practitioner, in 1973.
