= Glenn Beckert =

American baseball player (1940–2020)

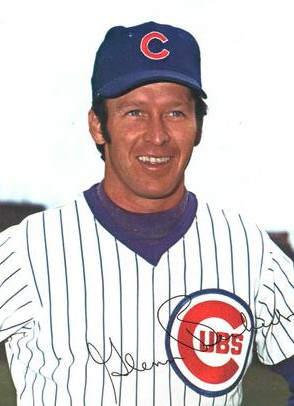
- Beckert in 1973
- Second baseman
- Born: October 12, 1940; Pittsburgh, Pennsylvania, U.S.
- Died: April 12, 2020 (aged 79); Englewood, Florida, U.S.
- Batted: Right Threw: Right

MLB debut
- April 12, 1965, for the Chicago Cubs

Last MLB appearance
- April 27, 1975, for the San Diego Padres

MLB statistics
- Batting average: .283
- Home runs: 22
- Runs batted in: 360
- Stats at Baseball Reference

Teams
- Chicago Cubs (1965–1973); San Diego Padres (1974–1975)

Career highlights and awards
- 4× All-Star (1969–1972); Gold Glove Award (1968); Chicago Cubs Hall of Fame

Glenn Alfred Beckert (October 12, 1940 – April 12, 2020) was an American professional baseball player. He played in Major League Baseball (MLB) as a second baseman for the Chicago Cubs for nine seasons from 1965 to 1973, before ending his career with the San Diego Padres in 1975. He was a four-time All-Star and a Gold Glove Award winner.

== Baseball career ==
Beckert attended Perry Traditional Academy in Pittsburgh, Pennsylvania, graduating in 1958. He was named All-City in baseball and basketball. He attended Allegheny College, where he played college baseball, graduating with a bachelor's degree in political science in 1962.

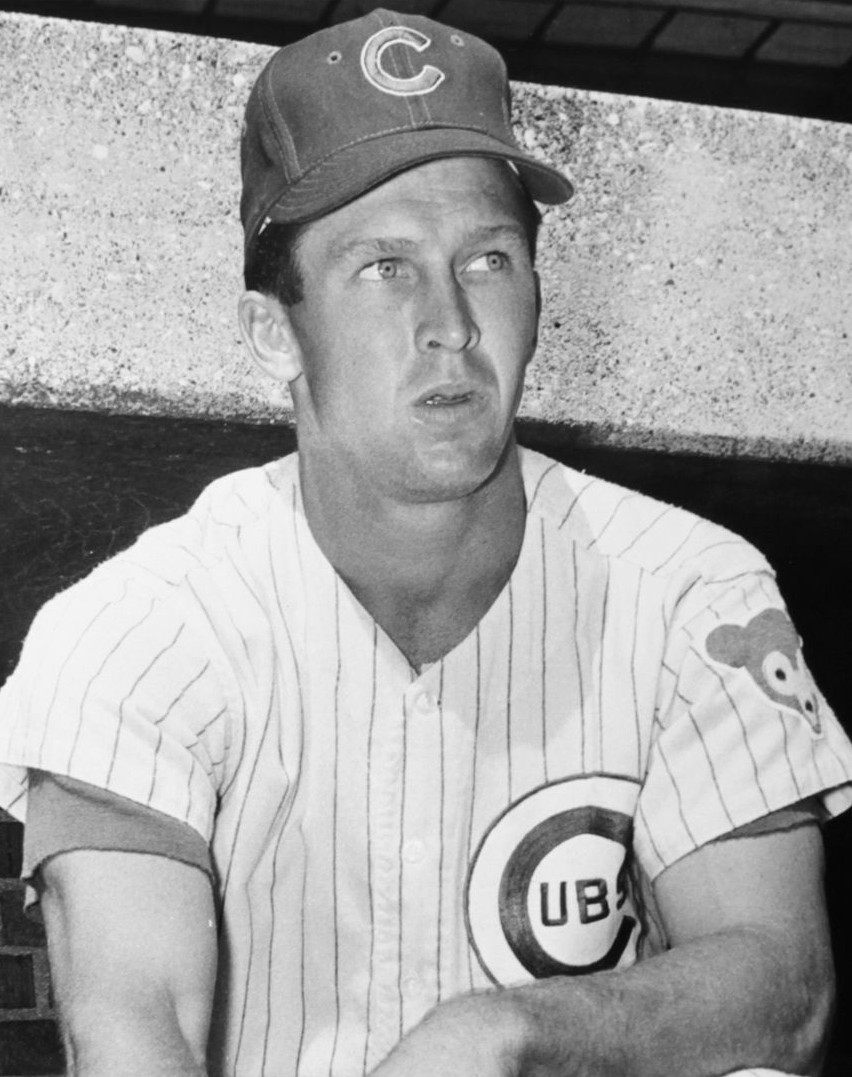
Beckert, circa 1967

The Boston Red Sox signed Beckert as an amateur free agent in 1962. He was selected later that year by the Chicago Cubs from the Red Sox in the First-Year Player Draft on November 26. He spent three years in the minors as a shortstop, where he led the Pacific Coast League in putouts and assists in 1964.

Following the sudden death of Cubs second baseman Ken Hubbs in 1964, the Cubs brought Beckert to the major leagues as their second baseman for the 1965 season. Beckert played nine seasons as the Cubs' second baseman. During his entire Cub tenure, he played alongside shortstop Don Kessinger and third baseman Ron Santo. Beckert led the National League in assists during his rookie year. He was a tough batter, leading the league five times in fewest strikeouts per at bats.

In 1968, Beckert led the league in runs scored. He also won the National League's Gold Glove Award for second basemen, ending Bill Mazeroski's run of five consecutive Gold Glove Awards. In 1969, he was chosen for his first of four consecutive All-Star Games. He had his best offensive season in 1971 when he hit for a career-high .342 batting average to finish third in the National League batting championship behind Joe Torre and Ralph Garr.

After the 1973 season, the Cubs traded Beckert, along with Bobby Fenwick, to the San Diego Padres for Jerry Morales. Beckert was a utility infielder and pinch hitter with the Padres before being released in May 1975. He is an inductee in the Chicagoland Sports Hall of Fame.

== Career statistics ==
In an 11-year career, Beckert played in 1,320 games, accumulating 1,473 hits in 5,208 at bats for a .283 career batting average along with 22 home runs and 360 runs batted in. He posted a .973 career fielding percentage.

== Personal life ==
Beckert married Mary Marshall, a flight attendant, in November 1967.

Beckert died on April 12, 2020.

== See also ==
- List of Major League Baseball annual runs scored leaders
