= Don Mason (baseball) =

American baseball player (1944–2018)

- Second baseman
- Born: December 20, 1944; Boston, Massachusetts, U.S.
- Died: June 19, 2018 (aged 73); South Yarmouth, Massachusetts, U.S.
- Batted: Left Threw: Right

MLB debut
- April 14, 1966, for the San Francisco Giants

Last MLB appearance
- May 30, 1973, for the San Diego Padres

MLB statistics
- Batting average: .205
- Home runs: 3
- Runs batted in: 27
- Stats at Baseball Reference

Teams
- San Francisco Giants (1966–1970); San Diego Padres (1971–1973)

Donald Stetson Mason (December 20, 1944 – June 19, 2018) was an American professional baseball player. The second baseman appeared in 336 games in Major League Baseball over all or parts of eight seasons (1966–1973) for the San Francisco Giants and San Diego Padres.

Born in Boston, Mason batted left-handed, threw right-handed, and was listed as 5 feet 11 inches (1.80 m) tall and 160 pounds (73 kg). He graduated from Newton High School, where he was a standout in baseball and hockey, and attended Parsons College before signing with the Washington Senators in 1965. That year, Mason hit 18 home runs and batted .285 in the full-season Class A New York–Penn League and was selected by the Giants in the winter Rule 5 draft. He then spent all of 1966 on the Giants' MLB roster, but had only 26 plate appearances and three hits. One of those hits was his first big-league home run, a solo blast off Sammy Ellis of the Cincinnati Reds on June 24.

Mason also played three other full seasons in the National League (1969, 1970 and 1971), exceeding 100 games played in 1969 and 1971. In the latter year, he was the most-used second baseman for the 1971 Padres, starting 90 games at the position, but Mason batted only .212 will 11 runs batted in.

All told, Mason collected 143 hits, with 16 doubles, three triples, three homers and 27 runs batted in in 336 big-league games. He batted .205 lifetime.

Mason's pro career ended after the 1974 season. He moved to Cape Cod five years later, and died in South Yarmouth, Massachusetts, at the age of 73.
