= Horace Clarke =

American baseball player (1939–2020)

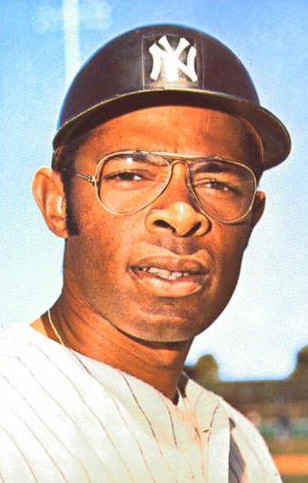
- Clarke in 1970
- Second baseman
- Born: June 2, 1939; Frederiksted, St. Croix, United States Virgin Islands
- Died: August 5, 2020 (aged 81); Laurel, Maryland, U.S.
- Batted: Switch Threw: Right

MLB debut
- May 13, 1965, for the New York Yankees

Last MLB appearance
- September 15, 1974, for the San Diego Padres

MLB statistics
- Batting average: .256
- Home runs: 27
- Runs batted in: 304
- Stats at Baseball Reference

Teams
- New York Yankees (1965–1974); San Diego Padres (1974)

Horace Meredith Clarke (June 2, 1939 – August 5, 2020) was an American Virgin Islander baseball second baseman who played ten seasons in Major League Baseball (MLB). He played for the New York Yankees and the San Diego Padres from 1965 to 1974. He was a switch hitter who threw right-handed.

Clarke was signed as an amateur free agent by the New York Yankees in 1958 and played for seven of their minor league affiliates until 1965, when the Yankees promoted him to the major leagues. After spending seven more seasons with the organization, he was traded to the San Diego Padres in 1974. He played his last game on September 15 that year.

== Early life ==
Clarke was born in Frederiksted, on the island of Saint Croix in the United States Virgin Islands, on June 2, 1939. He was the youngest of six children of Dennis and Vivian Woods Clarke. He had one brother (Verne) and four sisters (Dina, Holly, Annette, and Letty). He first played softball, since there were no Little Leagues in the territory at the time. He reportedly became a switch hitter because the field was oriented in a way that hitting from the right side would result in the baseball landing in the ocean. He attended Christiansted High School. He was scouted by José "Pepe" Seda, who worked for the New York Yankees, and was signed as an amateur free agent in January 1958.

== Career ==
Clarke made his Major League Baseball debut on May 13, 1965, against the Boston Red Sox at Fenway Park; he singled off Dave Morehead in his first major league at bat. In his rookie season of 1966, Clarke, sharing shortstop duties with Tom Tresh after Tony Kubek's retirement before the start of the season, batted .266 with six home runs and 28 runs batted in (RBI). He became the Yankees' regular second baseman in 1967, upon the retirement of longtime veteran Bobby Richardson. That year, he finished first among American League (AL) second basemen in fielding percentage (.990). In the space of one month in 1970, he broke up three possible no-hitters in the ninth inning (Jim Rooker on June 4, Sonny Siebert on June 19 and, Joe Niekro on July 2). He and Joe Mauer are the only hitters to break up three no-hit bids in the ninth inning. That season, Clarke made 732 plate appearances (batting 686 times officially). Clarke was sold to the San Diego Padres on May 31, 1974, for $25,000. He retired at the end of the 1974 season.

Clarke finished his decade-long career with a 256 batting average, 27 home runs and 304 RBI. As one of the most well-known faces of the Yankees' teams from 1967 to 1973, that period in Yankees' history has been referred to as "The Horace Clarke Era." As a fielder, though, one major criticism of Clarke was that he would eschew turning the double play if the runner at second was approaching. Though it was rare for a baserunner to take him out with a slide, Clarke would often hold onto the baseball instead of throwing to first to complete the double play. While some criticized Clarke's reluctance to turn double plays, he led American League second basemen in turning double plays in 1969 and 1972. He finished in the AL top 5 in double plays from 1967 to 1973.He also led AL second basemen in putouts and assists from 1967 to 1972. Clarke also had a distinctive batting stance with his legs wide far apart.

== Later life ==
After his retirement, Clarke worked as a baseball instructor for the Virgin Islands Department of Recreation and as an assistant scout for the Kansas City Royals. Both his sons – Jeff and Jason (J.D.) – went on to play in the minor leagues.

Clarke died on August 5, 2020, at his home in Laurel, Maryland. He was 81, and suffered from complications of Alzheimer's disease.

== Sources ==
- Career statistics from Baseball Reference · Retrosheet · Baseball Almanac
- Baseball Almanac
