= Joe McIntosh =

American baseball player (born 1951)

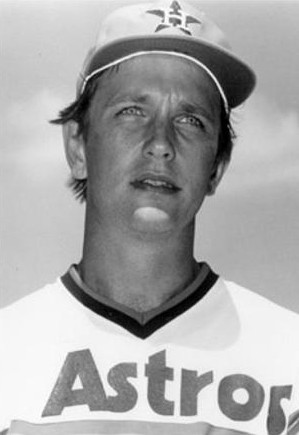
- McIntosh in 1976
- Pitcher
- Born: August 4, 1951 (age 73); Billings, Montana
- Batted: Switch Threw: Right

MLB debut
- April 5, 1974, for the San Diego Padres

Last MLB appearance
- September 27, 1975, for the San Diego Padres

MLB statistics
- Win–loss record: 8–19
- Earned run average: 3.68
- Strikeouts: 93
- Stats at Baseball Reference

Teams
- San Diego Padres (1974–1975)

Joseph Anthony McIntosh (born August 4, 1951) is a former Major League Baseball pitcher.

Born in Billings, Montana, McIntosh played for a local American Legion Baseball team as a pitcher and shortstop. After graduating from Billings Senior High School in 1969, he attended Washington State University, where he pitched for the school's baseball team. McIntosh received a degree from Washington State in 1973, and was drafted by the San Diego Padres that year. He began his professional career with the Walla Walla Padres of the Northwest League, posting an 8–6 win–loss record and a 2.44 earned run average (ERA). In 1974, McIntosh was promoted to the Triple-A Hawaii Islanders of the Pacific Coast League, where he was 9–11 with a 5.27 ERA.

McIntosh was called up to the Major Leagues later in 1974. He went 0–4 in 10 games for the Padres, including five starts, and had a 3.62 ERA. In 1975, he started 28 games for the Padres, and made nine relief appearances as well. McIntosh was 8–15 with a 3.69 ERA during the 1975 season, and pitched four complete games, including his only major league shutout. Following the season, in which he was fourth in the National League in losses, McIntosh was traded along with Larry Hardy to the Houston Astros for Doug Rader on December 11, 1975, and never pitched in the big leagues again. He finished his career by appearing in four games for the Gulf Coast League Astros in 1979. In 1988, Washington State University inducted McIntosh into its WSU Athletic Hall of Fame.
