= Rusty Gerhardt =

American baseball player

- Pitcher
- Born: August 13, 1950 (age 75); Baltimore, Maryland, U.S.
- Batted: Switch Threw: Left

MLB debut
- July 27, 1974, for the San Diego Padres

Last MLB appearance
- September 24, 1974, for the San Diego Padres

MLB statistics
- Win–loss record: 2–1
- Earned run average: 7.07
- Strikeouts: 22
- Stats at Baseball Reference

Teams
- San Diego Padres (1974)

Allen Russell Gerhardt (born August 13, 1950) is an American former professional baseball player. He was a left-handed pitcher who appeared in 23 games, 22 in relief, for the San Diego Padres of Major League Baseball in 1974.

Born in Baltimore, Maryland, Gerhardt stood 5 feet 9 inches (1.75 m) tall and weighed 175 pounds (79 kg), and played college baseball at Clemson University. In 1969, he played collegiate summer baseball with the Chatham A's of the Cape Cod Baseball League. Gerhardt was named "Sandlot Player of the Year" by the National Baseball Congress in 1970. He was selected by the Padres in the 12th round of the 1972 Major League Baseball draft.

In 35 2/3 big-league innings pitched, Gerhardt allowed 44 hits and 17 bases on balls, with 22 strikeouts. He recorded one save and won two of his three decisions. His one save came on September 7, 1974 (1 2/3rd perfect innings against the Astros).

Gerhardt spent his entire nine-season active career (1972–1979; 1981) in the Padres' organization. After it ended, he became a coach and manager in the farm systems of the Padres and the Texas Rangers. Since the mid-1990s he has been a scouting supervisor for the Major League Baseball Scouting Bureau based in North Texas and Louisiana.
