= Bob Davis (catcher) =

American baseball player (born 1952)

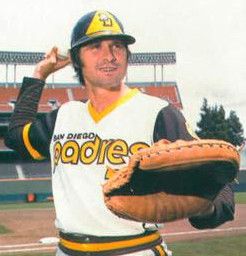
- Davis in 1978
- Catcher
- Born: March 1, 1952 (age 73); Pryor, Oklahoma, U.S.
- Batted: Right Threw: Right

MLB debut
- April 6, 1973, for the San Diego Padres

Last MLB appearance
- September 9, 1981, for the California Angels

MLB statistics
- Batting average: .197
- Home runs: 6
- Runs batted in: 51
- Stats at Baseball Reference

Teams
- San Diego Padres (1973–1978); Toronto Blue Jays (1979–1980); California Angels (1981)

Robert John Eugene Davis (born March 1, 1952) is an American former professional baseball catcher who played eight seasons for the San Diego Padres, Toronto Blue Jays, and California Angels of Major League Baseball (MLB).
