= Gene Locklear =

American baseball player (born 1949)

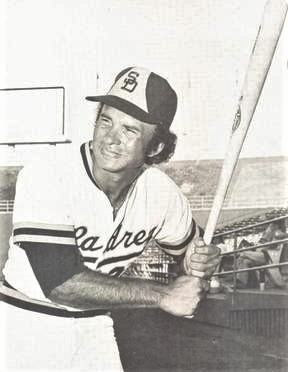
- Locklear with the Padres in 1975
- Outfielder
- Born: July 19, 1949 (age 77); Lumberton, North Carolina, U.S.
- Batted: Left Threw: Right

Professional debut
- MLB: April 5, 1973, for the Cincinnati Reds
- NPB: April 7, 1978, for the Nippon-Ham Fighters

Last appearance
- MLB: October 2, 1977, for the New York Yankees
- NPB: September 19, 1978, for the Nippon-Ham Fighters

MLB statistics
- Batting average: .274
- Home runs: 9
- Runs batted in: 66

NPB statistics
- Batting average: .240
- Home runs: 8
- Runs batted in: 38
- Stats at Baseball Reference

Teams
- Cincinnati Reds (1973); San Diego Padres (1973–1976); New York Yankees (1976–1977); Nippon-Ham Fighters (1978)

Gene Locklear (born July 19, 1949) is an American professional baseball outfielder and commercial artist. He played in Major League Baseball for the Cincinnati Reds, San Diego Padres, and New York Yankees from 1973 to 1977 and in Nippon Professional Baseball for the Nippon-Ham Fighters in 1978. Locklear began painting as a child and became a professional artist during his baseball career.

== Early life ==
Locklear was born in Lumberton, North Carolina, in 1949. He was raised on a tobacco farm in Pembroke, North Carolina. Locklear is a full-blooded member of the Lumbee people.

Locklear attended Pembroke Senior High School, where he played baseball and gridiron football. He graduated in 1968. He also earned a degree in commercial art through a correspondence course, as Pembroke did not have any art classes. Locklear received no offers to play college baseball, including from Pembroke State University. After graduating from high school, he worked on a road construction crew and played baseball semi-professionally.

== Baseball career ==
In 1969, Locklear tried out with the Pittsburgh Pirates, but was not offered a contract. He attended a tryout camp with the Cincinnati Reds and signed with them for no signing bonus. He made his professional debut that year with the Tampa Tarpons of the Class A Florida State League before the Reds reassigned him to the Sioux Falls Packers of the Class A Northern League. He missed the beginning of the 1970 season due to his service with the United States Army. After his discharge, he played for the Asheville Tourists of the Class AA Southern League, but batted .164 and was demoted to Sioux Falls, where he batted .289. After batting .339 in the Florida Instructional League after the season, Locklear played for the Trois-Rivières Aigles of the Class AA Eastern League in 1971 and had a .323 batting average, which led the league. In 1972, he played for the Indianapolis Indians of the Class AAA American Association and again won the batting title, finishing the season with a .325 average.

Locklear made the Reds' Opening Day roster in 1973, making his major league debut on April 5. Ken Griffey and Dan Driessen played more than Locklear, who had a .192 batting average in limited playing time. On June 12, 1973, the Reds traded Locklear and Mike Johnson to the San Diego Padres for Fred Norman. He finished the season with a .233 average in 180 at bats between Cincinnati and San Diego. The Padres assigned Locklear to the Hawaii Islanders of the Class AAA Pacific Coast League to start the 1974 season. He batted .341 in 77 games and was promoted to the Padres, where he received 50 at bats. Locklear began the 1975 season with San Diego, but remained behind Bobby Tolan in their depth chart. In May, he complained about being benched despite batting .441, while Tolan was paid more but not hitting as well, and the Padres demoted Locklear to the Islanders. Locklear returned to the Padres after playing in 18 games for Hawaii and batted .321 in 237 at bats for the Padres for the 1975 season.

On July 10, 1976, the Padres traded Locklear to the New York Yankees for a player to be named later. The Yankees assigned Locklear to the Syracuse Chiefs of the Class AAA International League. Rick Sawyer went to the Padres from Syracuse as the player to be named later. The Yankees promoted Locklear to the major leagues on August 3. He played in 13 games for the Yankees in 1976. Playing for the Chiefs in 1977, Locklear batted over .300 with 25 home runs. He hit four home runs in a game against the Columbus Clippers, tying an International League single-game record. Though the Yankees were competing for the postseason, they acquired Cliff Johnson and Dave Kingman rather than turn to Locklear. The Yankees did promote Locklear to the major leagues as a September call-up, and he batted 3-for-5 in one game for the Yankees in the 1977 season.

After the 1977 season, Locklear became a free agent. He signed a two-year contract worth over $100,000 per season with the Nippon-Ham Fighters of Nippon Professional Baseball. He batted .240 in the 1978 season and the Fighters released him. He was invited to spring training in 1979 with the Reds as a non-roster player. Locklear did not make the team. The Reds offered Locklear a roster spot with Indianapolis, which he declined. Locklear retired from baseball.

== Art career ==
Locklear began painting when he was young. He began selling his paintings while he was in high school. In addition to athletes, Locklear also paints Native American people and landscapes. He paints with acrylic paint during the warmer months and oil paints during colder months.

Some of Locklear's art was featured at Pembroke State College in 1969. He has had paintings hung in The Pentagon, the Bureau of Indian Affairs, and the Smithsonian Institution. He made a painting of a country scene for Theodore C. Marrs, an advisor to President Gerald Ford, and the painting was hung in the White House from 1975 to 1976. He also made 26 paintings of Pete Rose and a collage of baseball stars that Rose hung in a restaurant that he owned.

Locklear has sold paintings to athletes including Ted Williams, Lance Armstrong, and Tiger Woods, and has sold paintings for upwards of $30,000. He painted murals in front of crowds at Super Bowl XXVII, the MLB All-Star Game, and the NBA All-Star Game. He designed the cover of the souvenir program for the 1995 MLB All Star Game. Locklear was the official artist of the Arena Football League and Super Bowl XXXVII.

== Personal life ==
Locklear and his wife, Susan, married in 1985. They live in El Cajon, California.
