= Rich Morales =

American baseball player (born 1943)

- Infielder
- Born: September 20, 1943 (age 82); San Francisco, California, U.S.
- Batted: Right Threw: Right

MLB debut
- August 8, 1967, for the Chicago White Sox

Last MLB appearance
- October 2, 1974, for the San Diego Padres

MLB statistics
- Batting average: .195
- Home runs: 6
- Runs batted in: 64
- Stats at Baseball Reference

Teams
- Chicago White Sox (1967–1973); San Diego Padres (1973–1974)

Richard Angelo Morales (born September 20, 1943) is an American former professional baseball player, coach and manager. An infielder, he appeared in Major League Baseball between 1967–1974 for the Chicago White Sox and San Diego Padres. Morales stood 5 feet 11 inches (1.80 m) tall and weighed 170 pounds (77 kg). He threw and batted right-handed.

In the Majors, Morales played 480 games, starting 294. Of all non-pitchers since 1930 with 1000+ at bats, Morales had a better batting average (.195) than only two, Ray Oyler and Mike Ryan, and a slugging average (.242) better than only Luis Gómez.

After his playing career, Morales was an MLB coach for the Atlanta Braves (1987, on the staff of his former White Sox pilot, Chuck Tanner) and a minor league manager for eight seasons, from 1979 until 1982 and from 1988 until 1991. He worked in the farm systems of the Oakland Athletics, Chicago Cubs, and Seattle Mariners. As of 2012, he was an area scout for the Baltimore Orioles based in Pacifica, California.

== Sources ==
- Sabermetric Baseball Encyclopedia
- Career statistics from Baseball Reference · Retrosheet · Baseball Almanac
