= Bill Laxton =

American baseball player (born 1948)

- Pitcher
- Born: January 5, 1948 (age 78); Camden, New Jersey, U.S.
- Batted: Left Threw: Left

MLB debut
- September 15, 1970, for the Philadelphia Phillies

Last MLB appearance
- September 19, 1977, for the Cleveland Indians

MLB statistics
- Win–loss record: 3–10
- Earned run average: 4.73
- Strikeouts: 189
- Stats at Baseball Reference

Teams
- Philadelphia Phillies (1970); San Diego Padres (1971, 1974); Detroit Tigers (1976); Seattle Mariners (1977); Cleveland Indians (1977)

William Harry Laxton (born January 5, 1948) is an American former Major League Baseball pitcher. Laxton pitched in all or part of five seasons in the majors between 1970 and 1977.

== Early career ==
Laxton grew up in Audubon, New Jersey and attended Audubon High School, graduating in 1966.

He was originally drafted by the Pittsburgh Pirates in the 7th round of the 1966 Major League Baseball draft. He was traded to the Philadelphia Phillies in December 1967 along with Harold Clem, Woodie Fryman, and Don Money in exchange for future-Hall of Famer Jim Bunning. He made his major league debut for the Phillies on September 15, 1970, when he pitched an inning in relief against the Pittsburgh Pirates, ending the season with a total of two relief appearances. He was selected by the San Diego Padres in the rule 5 draft the next offseason, then pitched in parts of two seasons for them before being released, finishing with an 0–2 record in 18 relief appearances in the 1971 season and an 0–1 record in 1974 in 30 appearances, all but one in relief. He signed with the New York Mets, who subsequently traded him to the Detroit Tigers along with Rusty Staub in exchange for Mickey Lolich and Billy Baldwin on December 12, 1975. He pitched in 26 games for the Tigers in the 1976 season, three of them as a starter, ending the season with an 0–5 record.

== Expansion ==
In 1976, Laxton was drafted from the Tigers by the Seattle Mariners in the expansion draft. On April 8, 1977, Laxton earned his first career win as the winning pitcher in the Mariners' first ever win (which was their third game overall). Laxton pitched the top of the ninth, and the Mariners scored two in the bottom of the inning for a come-from-behind, 7–6 win over the California Angels.

== Career's end ==
Before season's end, Laxton had been traded to the Cleveland Indians, and after the 1977 season would never pitch in the majors again. He started the 1978 season in the minor leagues with the Portland Beavers. The Indians traded him in midseason, sending him back to the Padres for Dave Freisleben. He finished the year with the Hawaii Islanders, then retired.

Laxton's son, Brett, pitched in the major leagues in 1999–2000 for the Oakland Athletics and Kansas City Royals.
