= Dan Spillner =

American baseball player (born 1951)

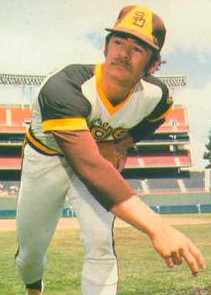
- Spillner in 1978
- Pitcher
- Born: November 27, 1951 (age 74); Casper, Wyoming, U.S.
- Batted: Right Threw: Right

MLB debut
- May 21, 1974, for the San Diego Padres

Last MLB appearance
- October 5, 1985, for the Chicago White Sox

MLB statistics
- Win–loss record: 75–89
- Earned run average: 4.21
- Strikeouts: 878
- Saves: 50
- Stats at Baseball Reference

Teams
- San Diego Padres (1974–1978); Cleveland Indians (1978–1984); Chicago White Sox (1984–1985)

Daniel Ray Spillner (born November 27, 1951) is an American former professional baseball player. He was a pitcher in Major League Baseball from 1974 to 1985. He played for the San Diego Padres, Cleveland Indians and Chicago White Sox. He led the Padres pitching staff in strikeouts in 1975.

== Biography ==
Spillner attended Federal Way High School in Federal Way, Washington. He played for the San Diego Padres, Cleveland Indians, and Chicago White Sox. His first career win was a 5–4 victory over Cincinnati on May 23, 1974. He threw a three-hit, ten-strikeout complete game shutout against Houston on September 11, 1974. He led the Padres in strikeouts in 1975 (104).

After suffering through three losing seasons as a Padre starter, he was part of the major leagues' busiest bullpen in 1977: He and Dave Tomlin each had 76 appearances; Rollie Fingers, 78. A Cleveland starter in 1980, Spillner was 16–11 despite a 5.29 ERA. He was two outs away from a no-hitter on August 20 before rookie Leo Sutherland had a single off him in a 3–0 victory over the White Sox; the no-hitter would have been the first in the AL since Bert Blyleven's on September 22, 1977. He had one fine year as an Indians reliever, going 12–10 (2.49) with 21 saves in 1982. On July 29 of that year, he entered a game with two outs and the bases loaded in the eleventh, induced Paul Molitor to fly out to end the inning, and picked up the win in a 12-inning, 5–1 victory over the Milwaukee Brewers. At the end of July that year, The Toledo Blade called him "one of the league's best" relief pitchers, after he had a 1.93 ERA and 12 saves to that point.

For his career, he compiled a 75–89 record, with a 4.21 ERA, 878 strikeouts and 50 saves in 556 appearances. Spillner, who relied mostly on a fastball, was prone to giving up home runs.

Baseball author Bill James wrote that Spillner was the worst hitting pitcher of the 1970s. For his career, Spillner had a .077 batting average, with 10 hits in 130 at bats, no home runs, and one run batted in.
