= Mike Johnson (1970s pitcher) =

American baseball player (1951–2026)

- Pitcher
- Born: March 2, 1951; Slayton, Minnesota, U.S.
- Died: May 20, 2026 (aged 75); Carefree, Arizona, U.S.
- Batted: Right Threw: Right

MLB debut
- July 25, 1974, for the San Diego Padres

Last MLB appearance
- October 2, 1974, for the San Diego Padres

MLB statistics
- Win–loss record: 0–2
- Earned run average: 4.64
- Strikeouts: 15
- Stats at Baseball Reference

Teams
- San Diego Padres (1974)

Michael Norton Johnson (March 2, 1951 – May 20, 2026) was an American Major League Baseball pitcher. Johnson played for the San Diego Padres in 1974. He batted and threw right-handed. Johnson died in Carefree, Arizona on May 20, 2026, at the age of 75.
