= Enzo Hernández =

Venezuelan baseball player (1949–2013)

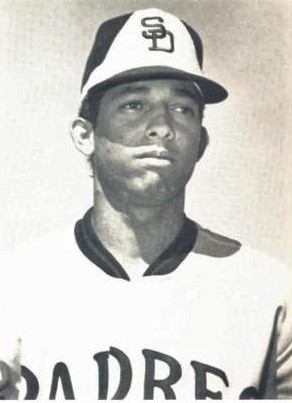
- Shortstop
- Born: February 12, 1949; Valle de Guanape, Anzoátegui, Venezuela
- Died: January 13, 2013 (aged 63); El Tigre, Venezuela
- Batted: Right Threw: Right

MLB debut
- April 17, 1971, for the San Diego Padres

Last MLB appearance
- August 19, 1978, for the Los Angeles Dodgers

MLB statistics
- Batting average: .224
- Home runs: 2
- Runs batted in: 113
- Stats at Baseball Reference

Teams
- San Diego Padres (1971–1977); Los Angeles Dodgers (1978)

Enzo Octavio Hernández (February 12, 1949 – January 13, 2013) was a Venezuelan shortstop in Major League Baseball who played from 1971 through 1978 for the San Diego Padres and Los Angeles Dodgers. Hernández was born in Valle de Guanape, Venezuela. Listed at 5' 8", 155 lb., he batted and threw right handed.

== Career ==
A typical "good field-no hit" shortstop, Hernández was initially signed by the Houston Astros in 1967, and later played in the Baltimore Orioles' minor league system. After being traded along with Tom Phoebus, Fred Beene and Al Severinsen from the Orioles for Pat Dobson and Tom Dukes on December 1, 1970, he became the Padres regular shortstop for most of the period from 1971 to 1976, stealing 20 or more bases four times. He also collected 595 assists In 1971, for the 5th highest total ever for a shortstop. On August 1, 1971, Hernández took part in one of eight recorded triple plays by the San Diego Padres franchise.

In an eight-season career, Hernández was a .224 hitter with two home runs, 113 RBIs, 241 runs, 522 hits, 66 doubles, 13 triples, and 129 stolen bases in 714 games played. Hernández finished his Major League Baseball career with an 80% success rate on stolen bases.

He also played from 1967 to 1979 with the Tiburones de La Guaira and Llaneros de Portuguesa of the Venezuelan Professional Baseball League.

In besides, he spent time with five different minor league clubs in parts of four seasons spanning 1967–1978.

Hernández died on January 13, 2013, aged 63, in El Tigre, Venezuela of an apparent suicide, after suffering a long illness. Citing a tweet from journalist Juan Guatache, the Venezuelan newspaper, El diario deportivo Líder, added that the former player "in recent months had received treatment for a depressive condition and in the past December fell to health," without giving other details.

== See also ==
- List of players from Venezuela in Major League Baseball
