= Dave Hilton (baseball) =

American baseball player (1950-2017)

- Third baseman
- Born: September 15, 1950; Uvalde, Texas, U.S.
- Died: September 17, 2017 (aged 67); Scottsdale, Arizona, U.S.
- Batted: Right Threw: Right

MLB debut
- September 10, 1972, for the San Diego Padres

Last MLB appearance
- April 27, 1975, for the San Diego Padres

MLB statistics
- Batting average: .213
- Home runs: 6
- Runs batted in: 33

NPB statistics
- Batting average: .284
- Home runs: 38
- Runs batted in: 128
- Stats at Baseball Reference

Teams
- San Diego Padres (1972–1975); Yakult Swallows (1978–1979); Hanshin Tigers (1980)

John David Hilton (September 15, 1950 – September 17, 2017) was an American professional baseball player. He was picked in the 1971 Secondary Draft out of Rice University and played four seasons for the San Diego Padres. On October 22, 1976 Hilton was one of the first players acquired by the expansion Toronto Blue Jays franchise, although he never played a game for them. He also played three seasons in Japan for the Yakult Swallows and Hanshin Tigers. Hilton was primarily a third baseman, but played several games at second base.

== Career ==
Early in the 1975 season, Hilton contracted hepatitis which caused the San Diego Padres to announce he would be out indefinitely.

Despite a productive career in Japan, particularly with the Swallows, Hilton was the subject of controversy in his 1980 stint with the Hanshin Tigers. The Tigers were managed by American Don Blasingame, who kept the slumping Hilton in the lineup despite the presence of promising rookie Akinobu Okada. The media and Hanshin fans campaigned relentlessly for Hilton to be benched and/or let go, making life miserable for both Hilton and Blasingame. As a result of the controversy, Hilton was released by the team and Blasingame resigned as manager.

Hilton managed the collegiate summer baseball team the Frederick Keys in 1997.

Hilton died September 17, 2017.

== In popular culture ==
Hilton is credited by Japanese author Haruki Murakami as having inspired him, at the age of 29, to become an author. Murakami had his epiphany as he saw Hilton hit a double, while watching a Yakult Swallows game in Japan.

Preceded by Julio Gargia	Frederick Keys manager 1997	Succeeded by Tommy Shields
