= Johnny Grubb =

American baseball player (born 1948)

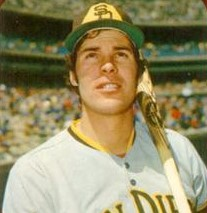
- Outfielder
- Born: August 4, 1948 (age 78); Richmond, Virginia, U.S.
- Batted: Left Threw: Right

MLB debut
- September 10, 1972, for the San Diego Padres

Last MLB appearance
- September 28, 1987, for the Detroit Tigers

MLB statistics
- Batting average: .278
- Home runs: 99
- Runs batted in: 475
- Stats at Baseball Reference

Teams
- San Diego Padres (1972–1976); Cleveland Indians (1977–1978); Texas Rangers (1978–1982); Detroit Tigers (1983–1987)

Career highlights and awards
- All-Star (1974); World Series champion (1984)
Medals
Men's baseball
Representing United States
Amateur World Series
Silver medal – second place	1970 Cartagena	Team

John Maywood Grubb, Jr. (born August 4, 1948) is an American former Major League Baseball outfielder and designated hitter, who also occasionally played at first base. He played with the San Diego Padres (1972–1976), Cleveland Indians (1977–1978), Texas Rangers (1978–1982), and the Detroit Tigers (1983–1987).

== Major League career ==
Grubb was drafted by the San Diego Padres in 1971 with the 24th pick in the first round. He had been previously drafted by the Boston Red Sox, Cincinnati Reds, and Atlanta Braves, but did not sign with them. He made his major league debut on September 10, 1972.

In his 1973 rookie season, Grubb put up good numbers and earned himself a starting position in the outfield by hitting .311 with eight home runs, 37 RBI, and 52 runs scored. Grubb made the 1974 National League All-star team during his sophomore season, and struck out in his only at-bat.

Highlights after the 1974 season included a 21-game hitting streak in 1979 while a member of the Texas Rangers. He was nearly dealt along with Sparky Lyle from the Rangers to the Philadelphia Phillies for Tug McGraw, Bake McBride and Larry Christenson at the 1979 Winter Meetings in Toronto, but the proposed transaction was never executed because a deferred money issue in Lyle's contract went unresolved.

Grubb was a member of the Detroit Tigers' 1984 World Series Championship team; the Tigers defeated his former team, the San Diego Padres, 4 games to 1. In his 16-year career, he posted a .278 batting average with 99 home runs, 475 RBI, and 553 runs scored. In the era since the designated hitter came into play (1973), he was the all-time leader among American League players when he was used as a pinch hitter, batting for the #9 hitter in the lineup. He was released by the Detroit Tigers after a disappointing 1987 season, despite having arguably the best season of his career in 1986.

=== Winter baseball ===
Grubb also played winter baseball in the Mexican Pacific League for two seasons with the Yaquis de Obregón.

== Personal life ==
Since retiring from professional baseball, Grubb has kept a low profile. He was the former varsity baseball coach at his alma mater, Meadowbrook High School in Richmond. There he coached former San Diego Padres pitcher Cla Meredith. Grubb and his wife are also active members of the Christian Church (Disciples of Christ).

== See also ==
- 1984 Detroit Tigers season
