= Alum Rock, San Jose =

Alum Rock
- Neighborhood of San Jose
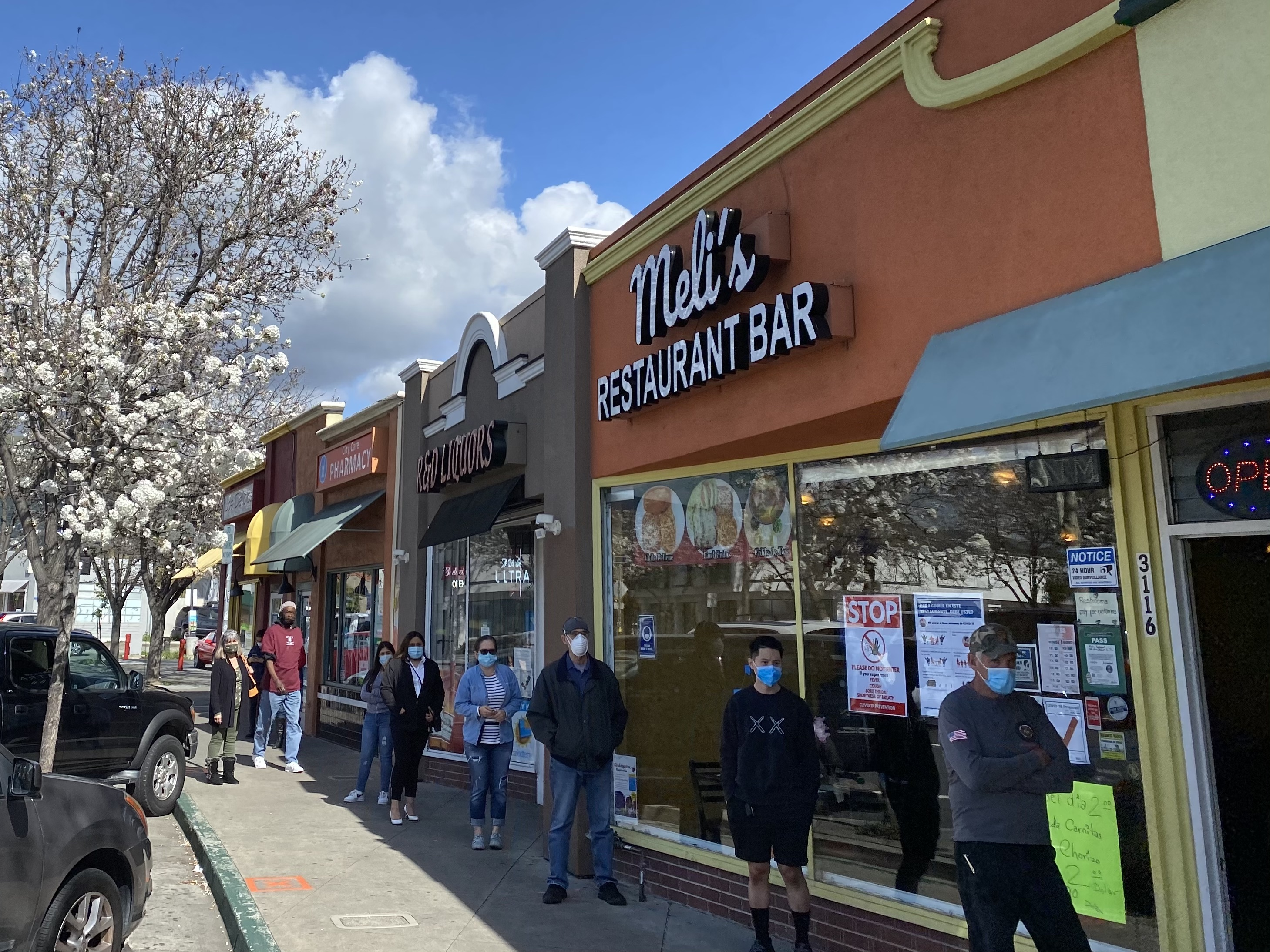
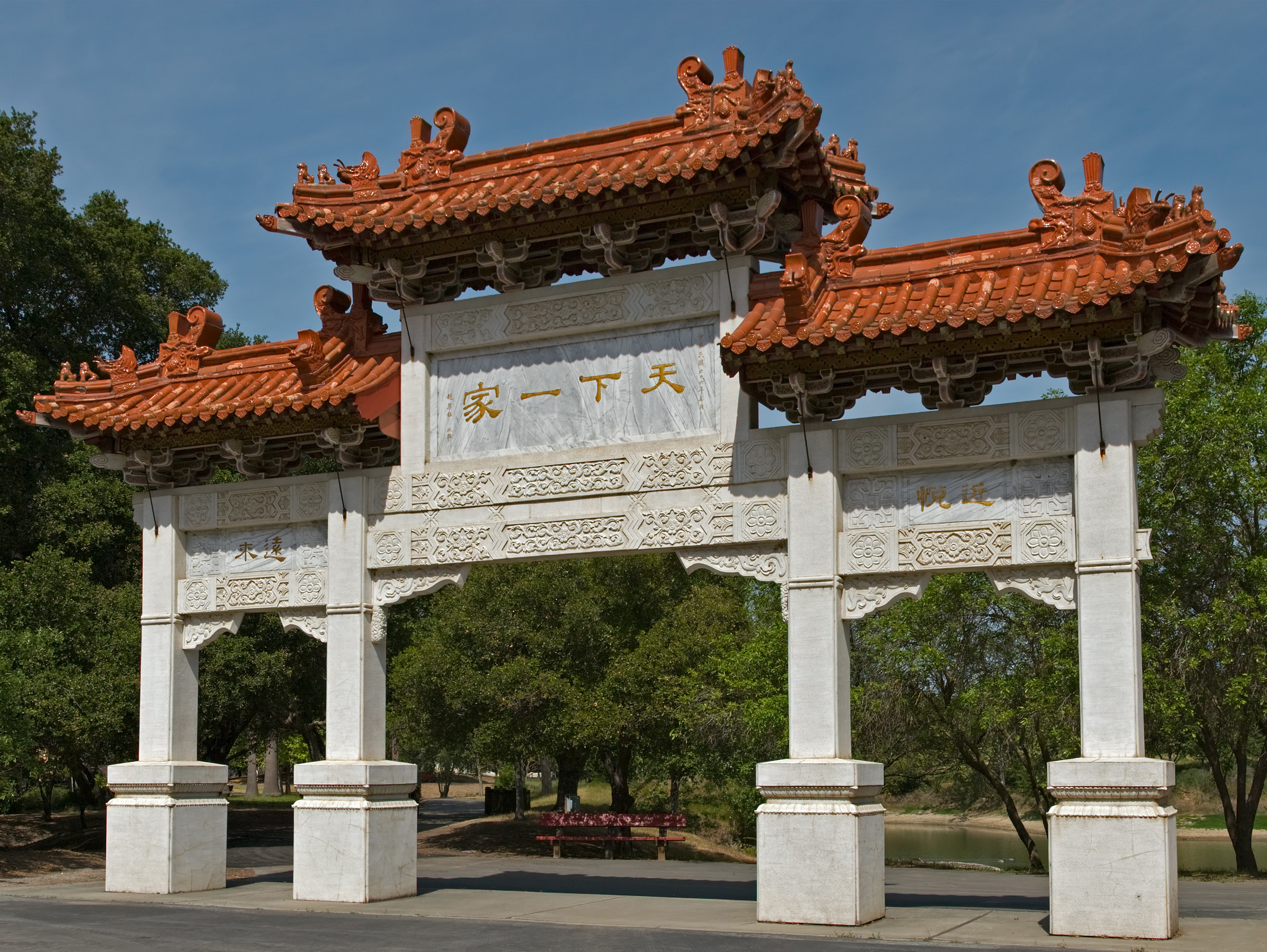
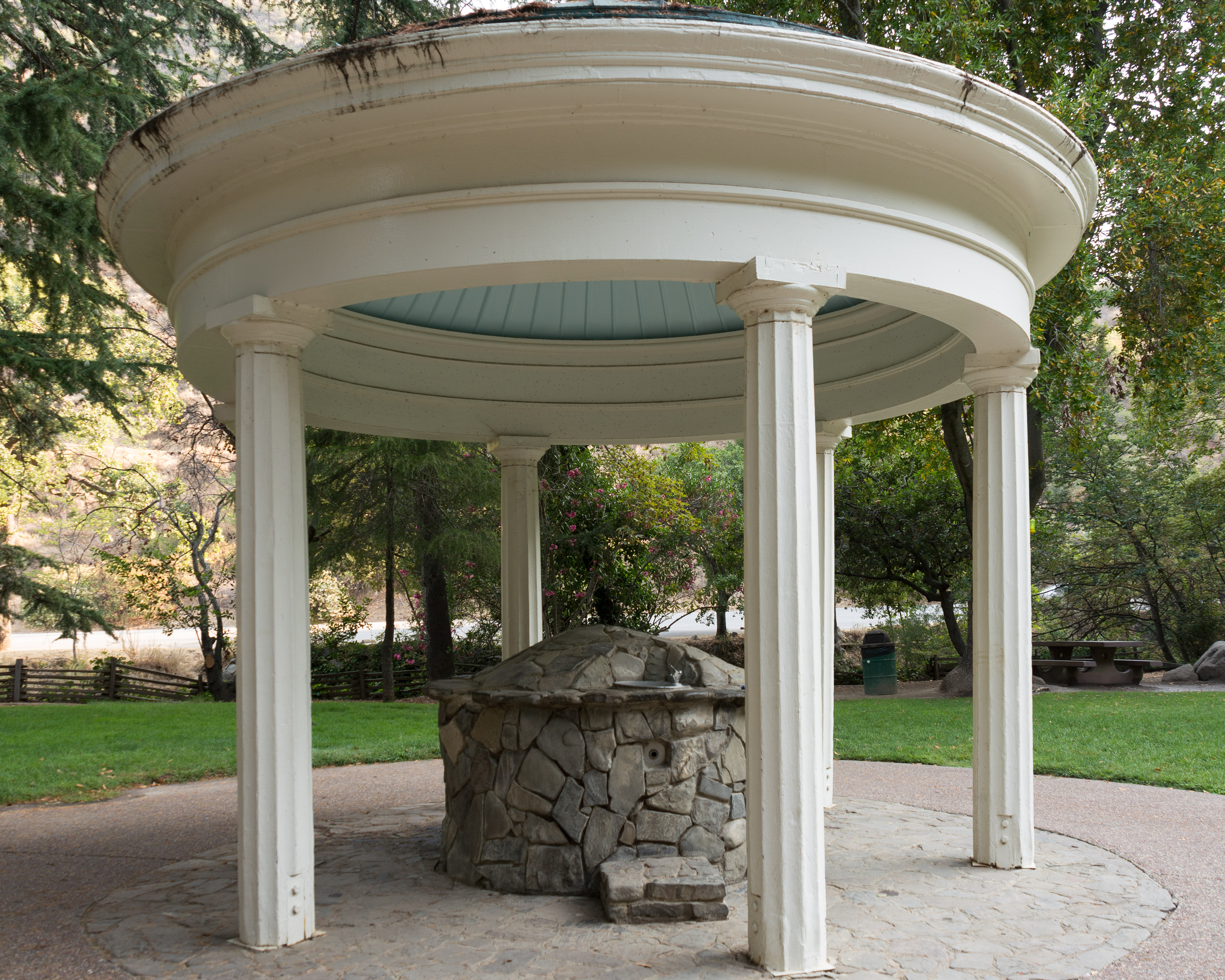
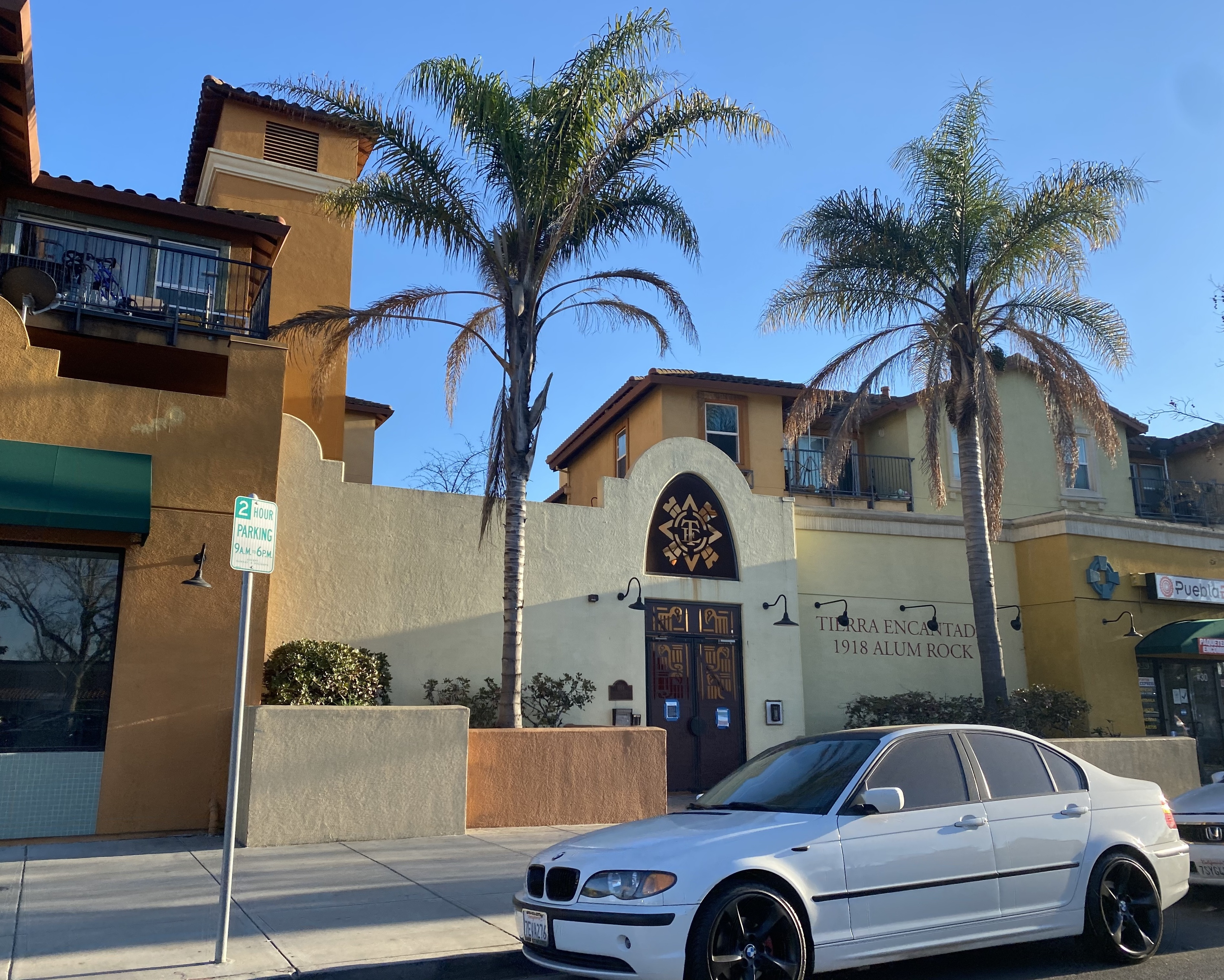
- Clockwise from top left: Alum Rock Village; Overfelt Gardens; Mayfair; Alum Rock Park
- Interactive map of Alum Rock
- Country: United States
- State: California
- County: Santa Clara
- City: San Jose
- Region: East San Jose

Alum Rock (/ˈæləm/) is a district of San Jose, California, located in East San Jose. Formerly an independent town, it has been a neighborhood of San Jose since the 1950s, though some portions are still unincorporated as a census-designated place. Alum Rock is one of San Jose's most notable and historic Chicano/Mexican-American districts. It is home to Alum Rock Park, the oldest municipal park in California and one of the largest in the country.

== History ==
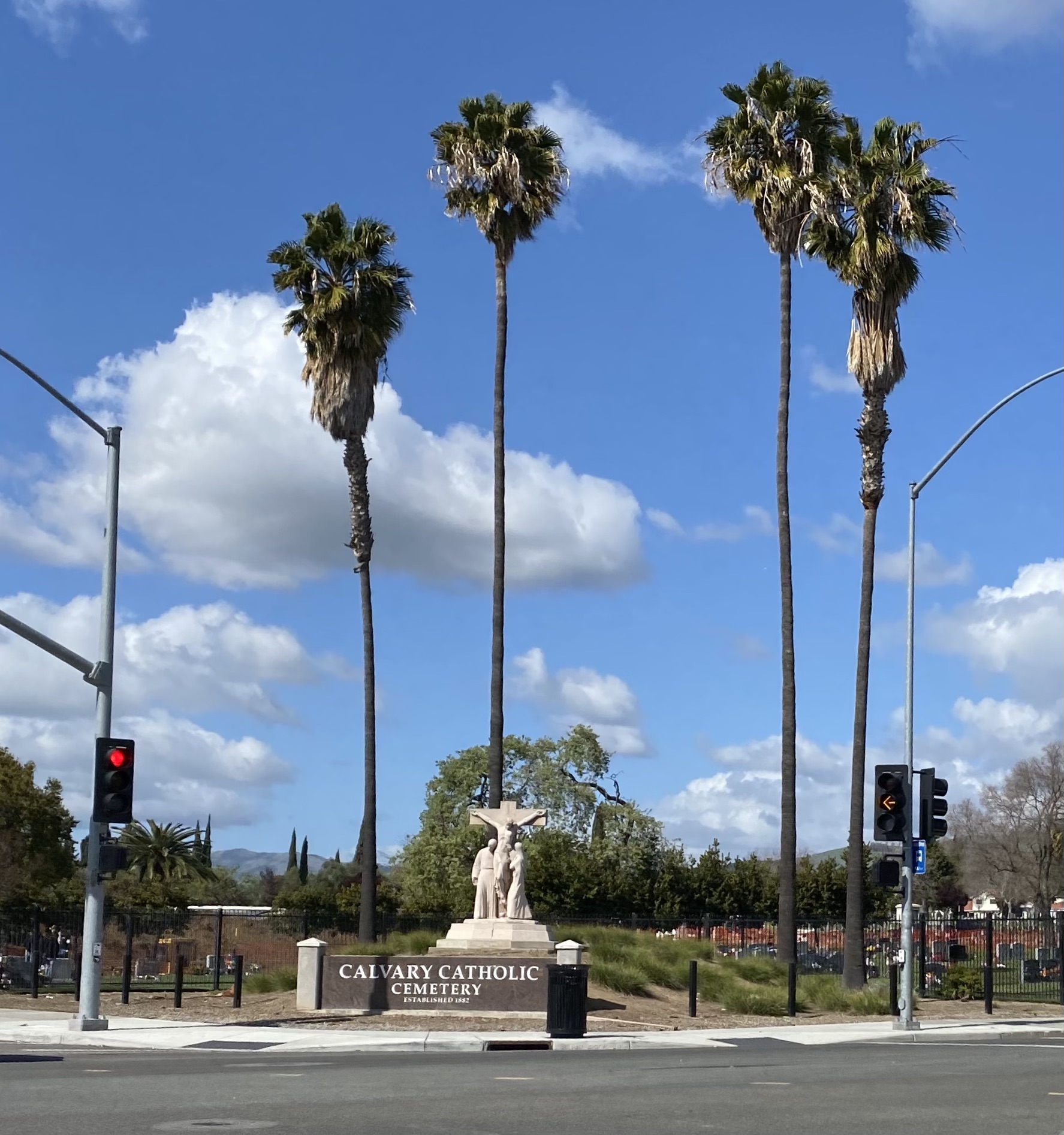
Calvary Cemetery was founded in 1882.

Alum Rock was named after a rock formerly thought to be composed of alum in nearby Alum Rock Park.

In the 19th century and early 20th century Alum Rock was mostly fruit orchard land. During the 1940s and 1950s, developers began building housing and formed the community of Alum Rock. During that time, Alum Rock Avenue and a passenger railroad passed through the town on the way to Alum Rock Park.

In the 1980s and 1990s, the neighborhood became older and increasingly populated with Latino immigrants as "white flight" affected the area of East San Jose. Today, Alum Rock remains a distinct community separated from the rest of San Jose.

== Geography ==
Alum Rock is a vast district of East San Jose, made up of numerous smaller neighborhoods. Neighborhoods include Little Portugal, Little Saigon, Mayfair, King & Story, East Foothills, Alum Rock Village, Mount Pleasant, among others.

Alum Rock is located north of the Evergreen district, south of the Berryessa district, and east of Downtown San Jose. Alum Rock is bound by the Diablo Range to the east, Coyote Creek to the west, Mabury Road to the north and Ocala Avenue to the south.

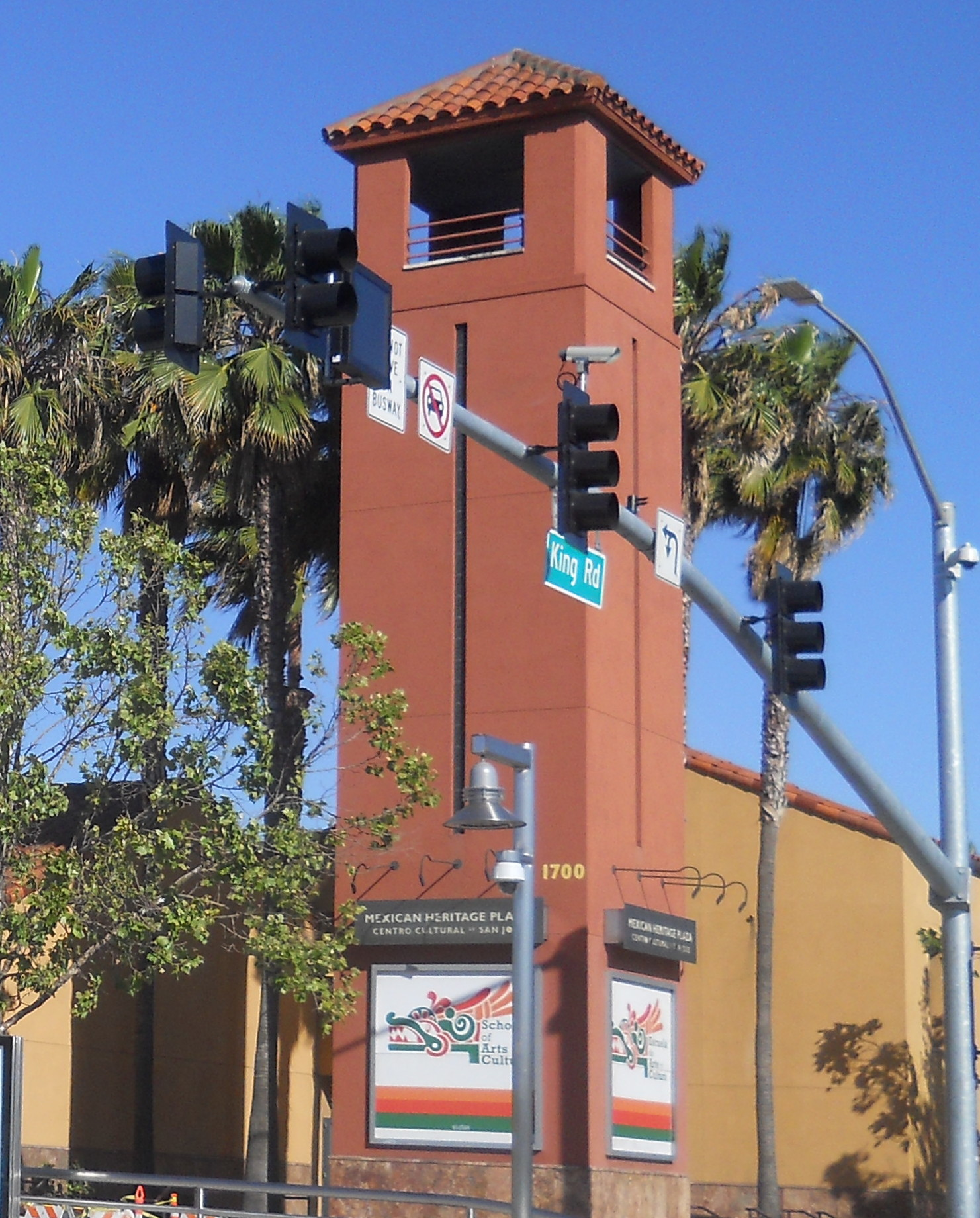
Mexican Heritage Plaza in Alum Rock's Mayfair neighborhood.

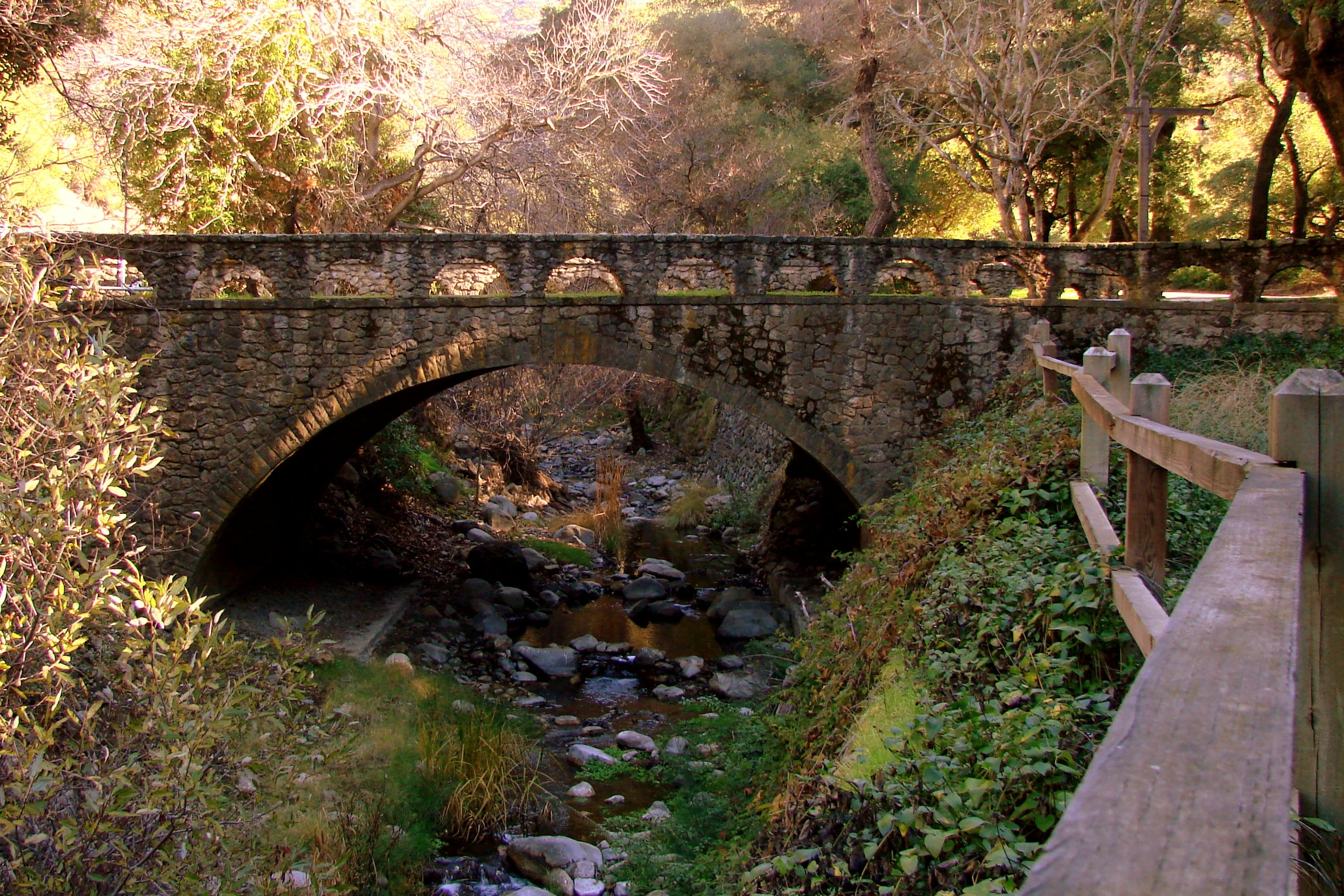
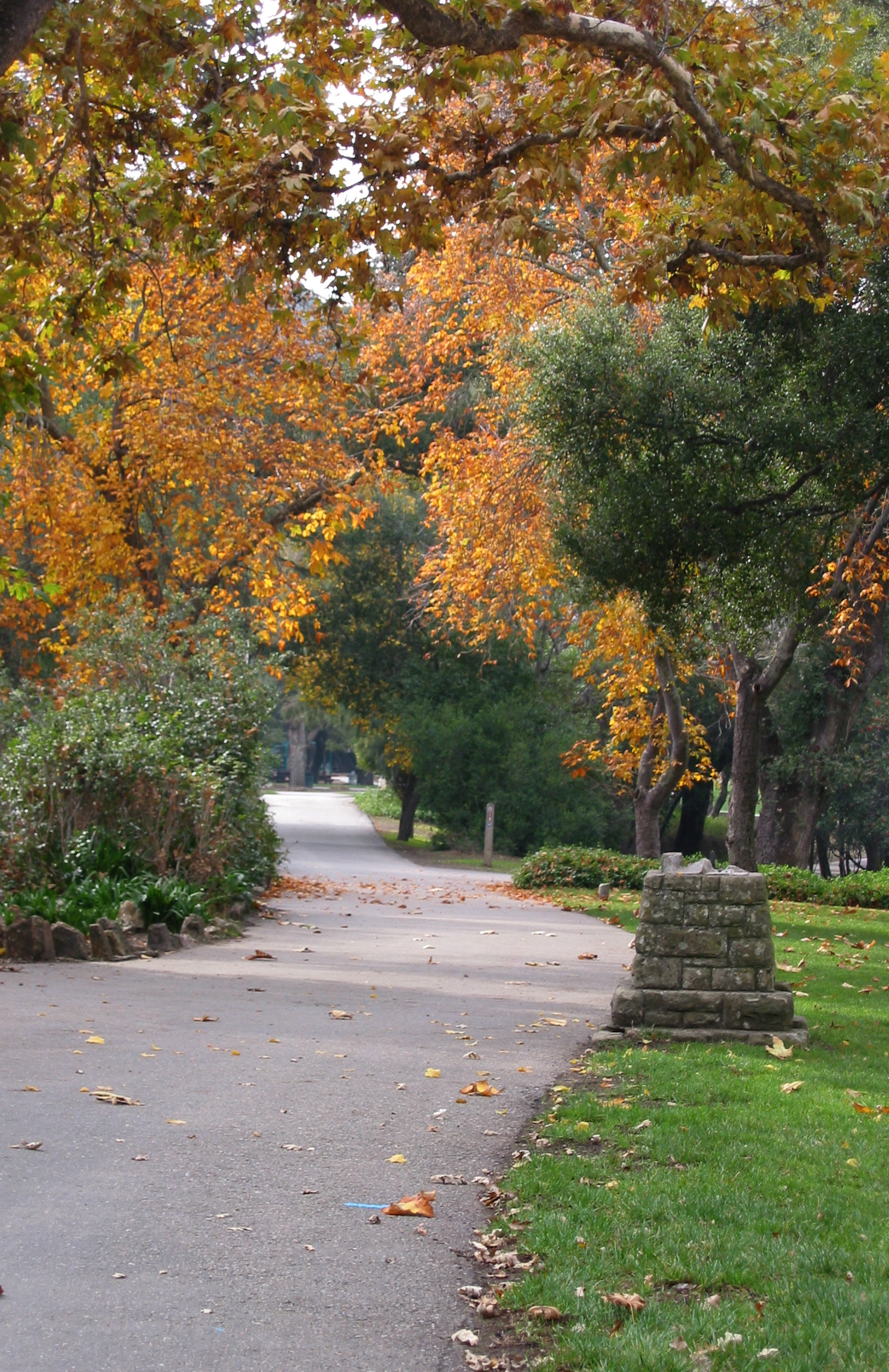
Alum Rock Park, founded in 1872, is California's oldest municipal park.

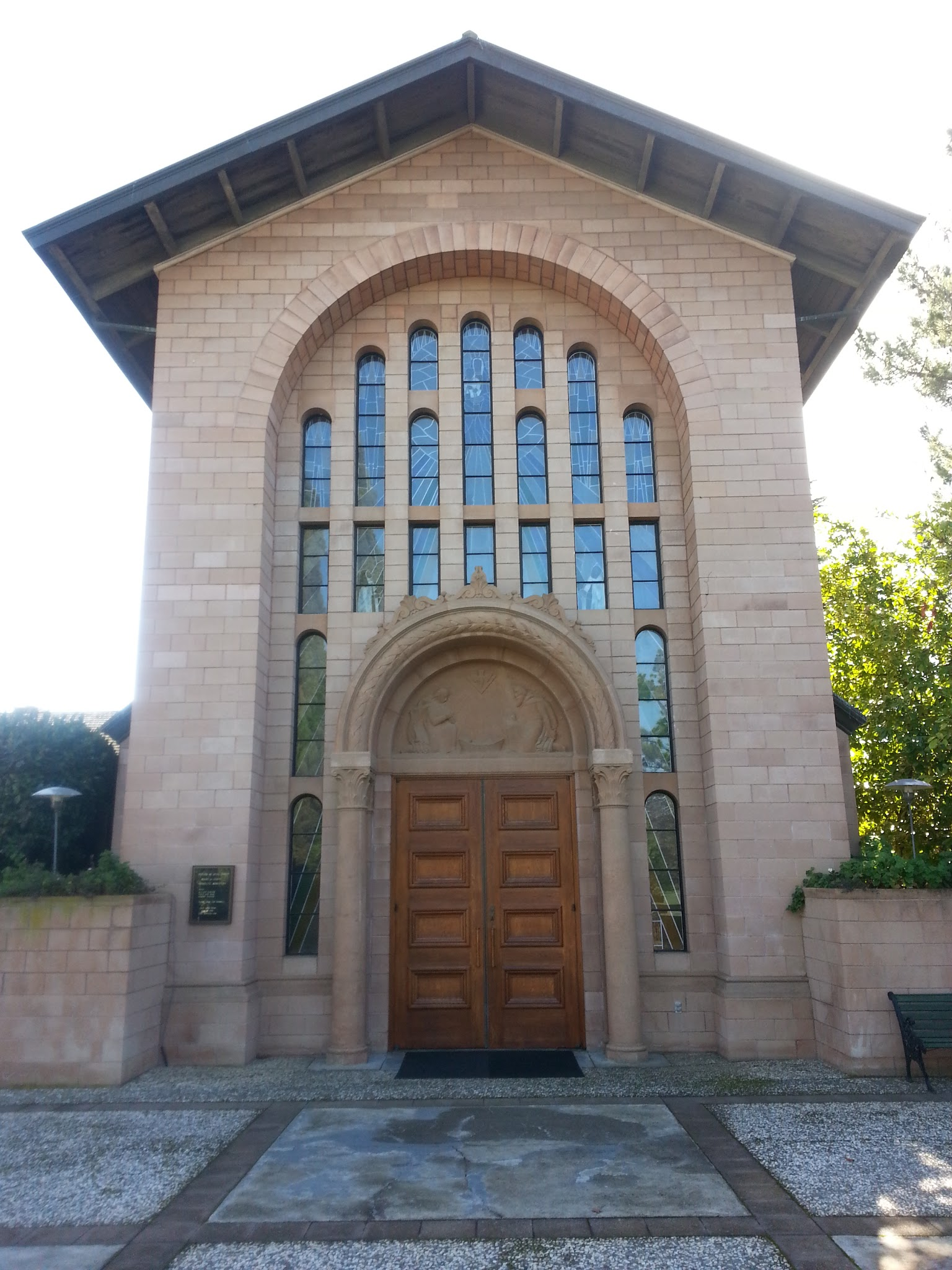
Mt. St. Joseph Monastery is a Carmelite novitiate.

== Government ==
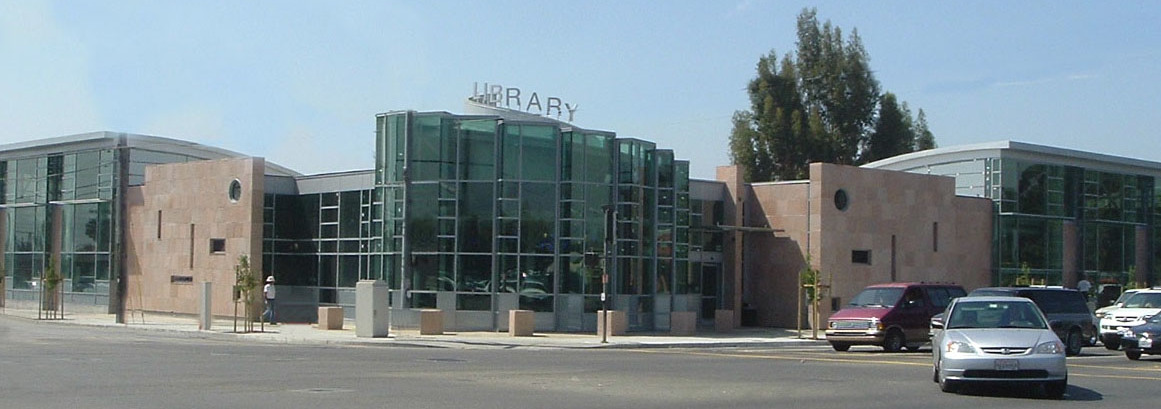
The Dr. Roberto Cruz Alum Rock Branch of the San José Public Library

In the San Jose City Council, most of Alum Rock falls inside of District 5, represented by Magdalena Carrasco, though small portions are inside of District 7 and District 4.

== Education ==
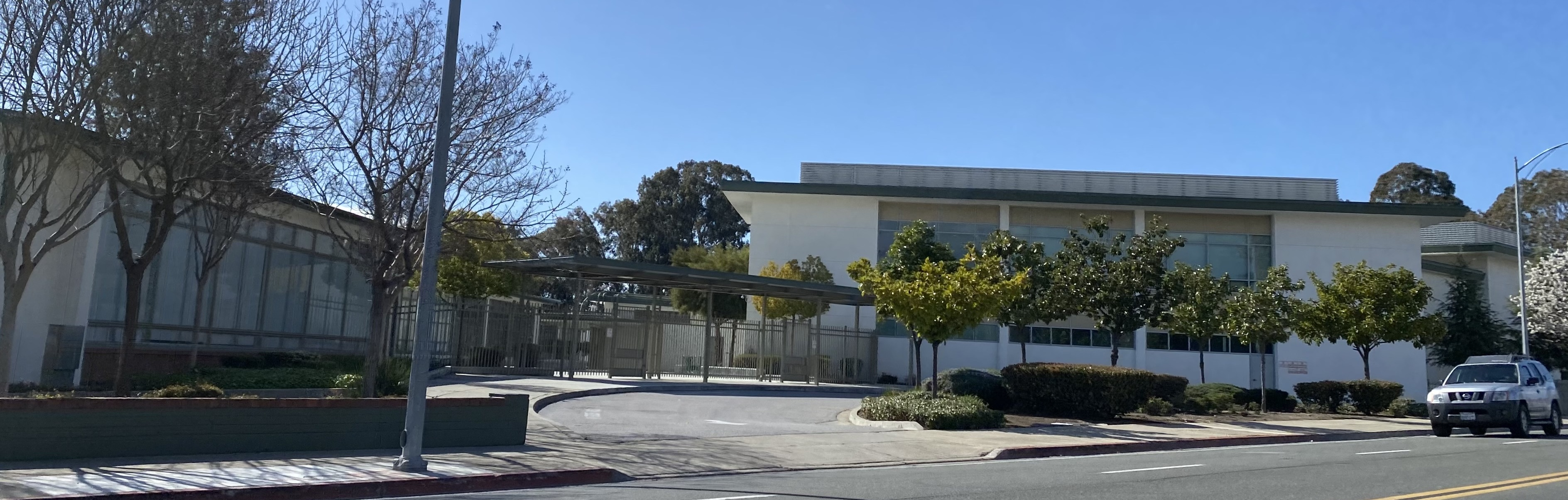
James Lick High School

The Alum Rock school district operates elementary and middle schools.

Schools in Alum Rock include:

- Cassell Elementary School
- César Chávez Elementary School
- Dorsa Elementary School
- Joseph George Middle School
- Linda Vista Elementary School
- McCollam Elementary School
- Meyer Elementary School
- San Antonio Elementary School
- Sheppard Middle School
- James Lick High School
- Mt. Pleasant High School
- William C. Overfelt High School

== Parks and plazas ==
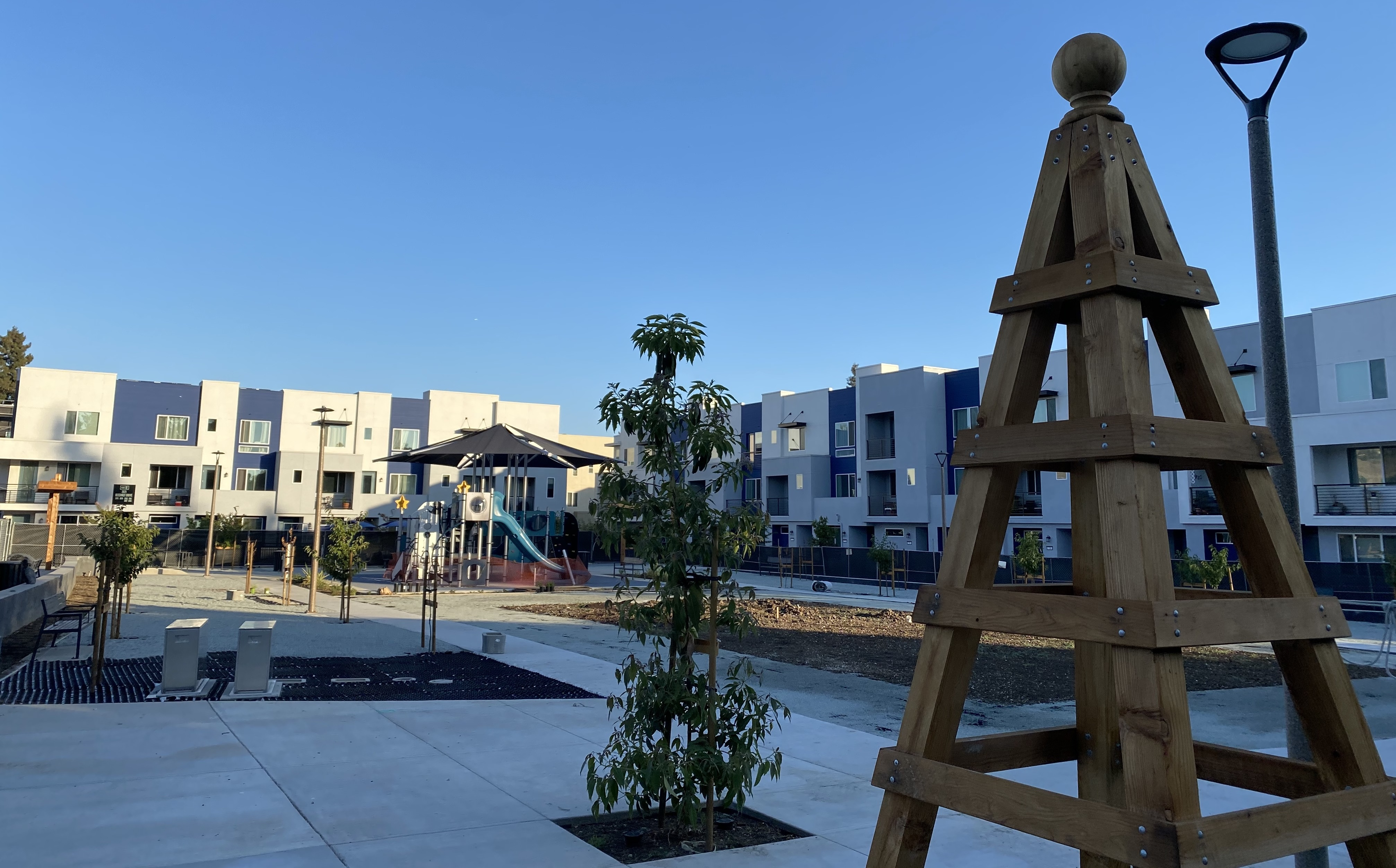
Delano Manongs Park

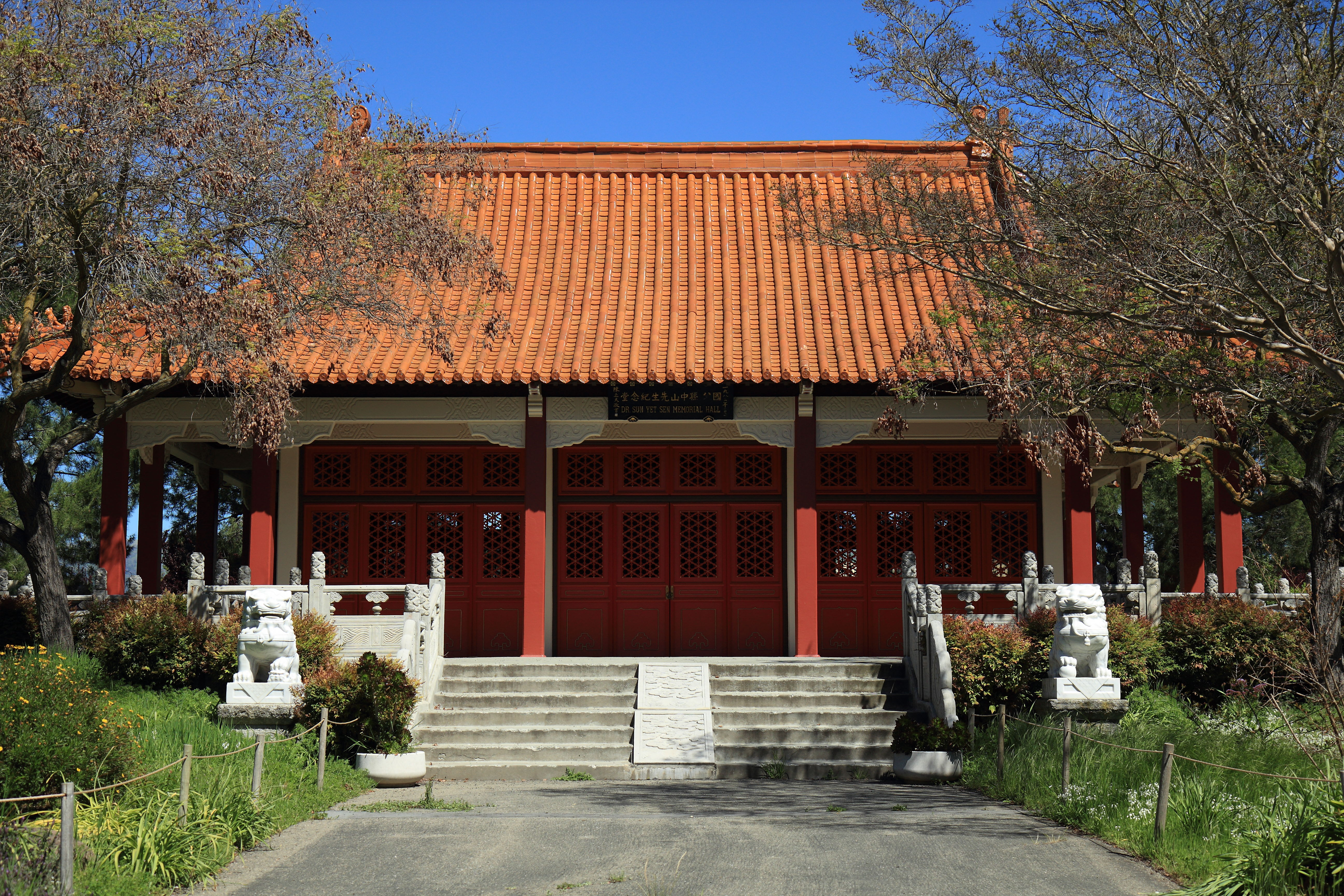
The Chinese Cultural Garden memorial hall at Overfelt Gardens

Parks in the Alum Rock district include:

- Alum Rock Park
- Cimarrón Park
- Delano Manongs Park
- Emma Prusch Farm Park
- Overfelt Gardens (including the Chinese Cultural Garden)
- Mayfair Park
- Plata Arroyo Park
- Zolezzi Park

== Transportation ==
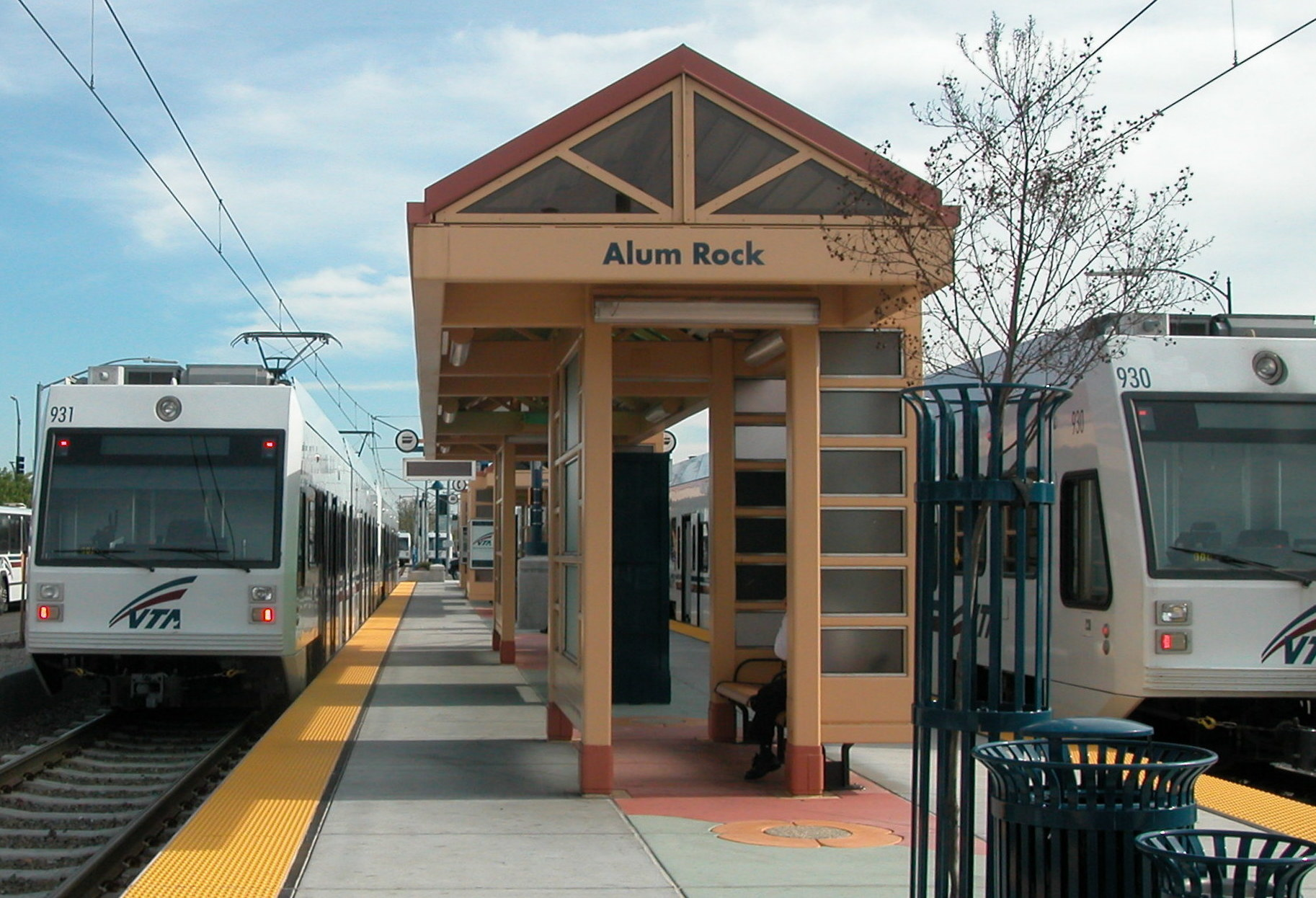
Alum Rock Transit Center

The Alum Rock Transit Center is an important transit center for East San Jose, operated by the Valley Transportation Authority. It is serviced by bus and light rail.

VTA light rail stations along Capitol Expressway within Alum Rock:

- McKee station
- Alum Rock station

Penitencia Creek station is located right at the border of Alum Rock and Berryessa.

The Eastridge Expansion of the VTA light rail plans the construction of another light rail station at Story Road and Capitol Expressway.

Both the Bayshore Freeway (US-101) and the Sinclair Freeway (I-680) pass through Alum Rock.

== Gallery ==
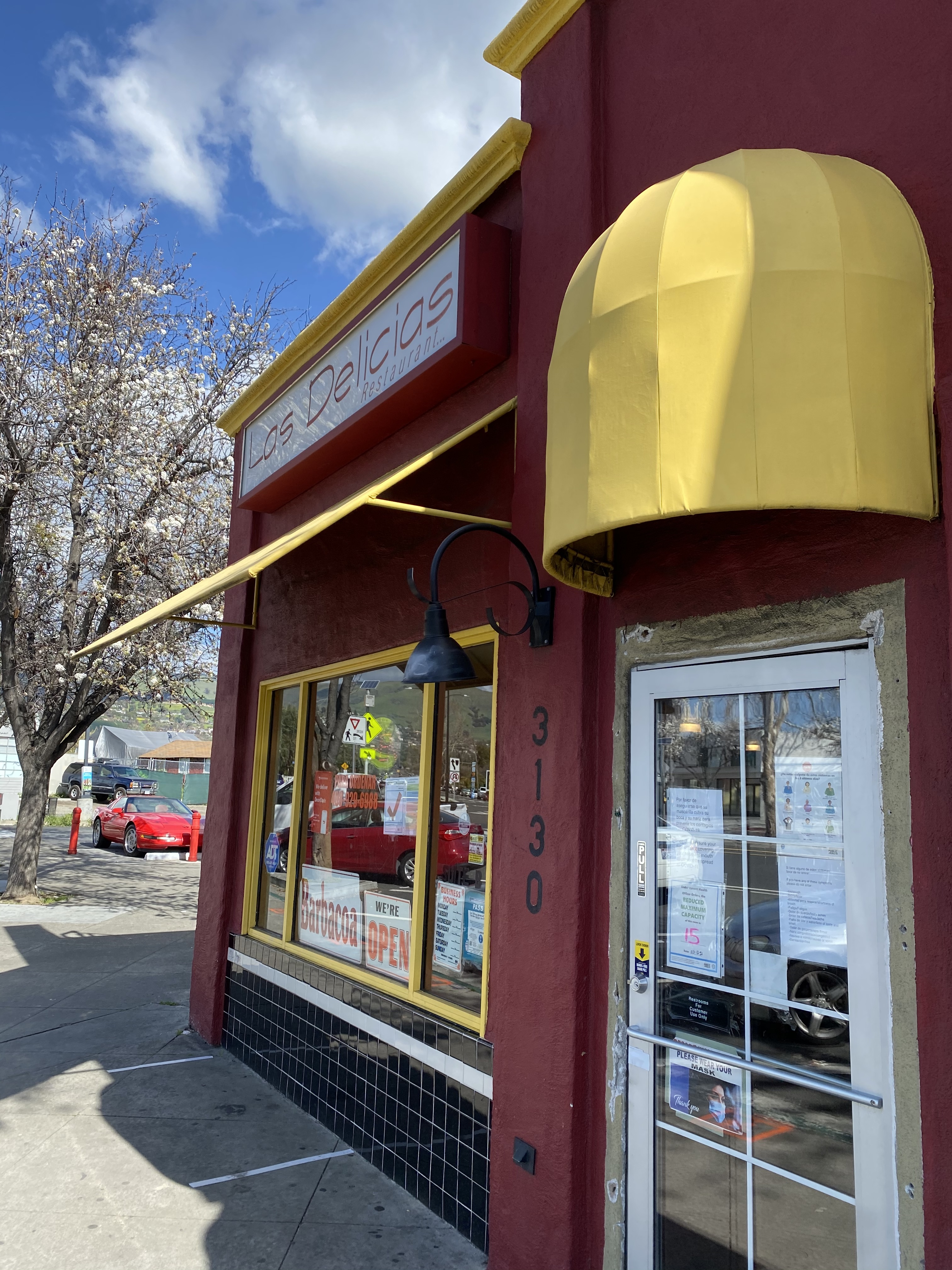
Alum Rock Village

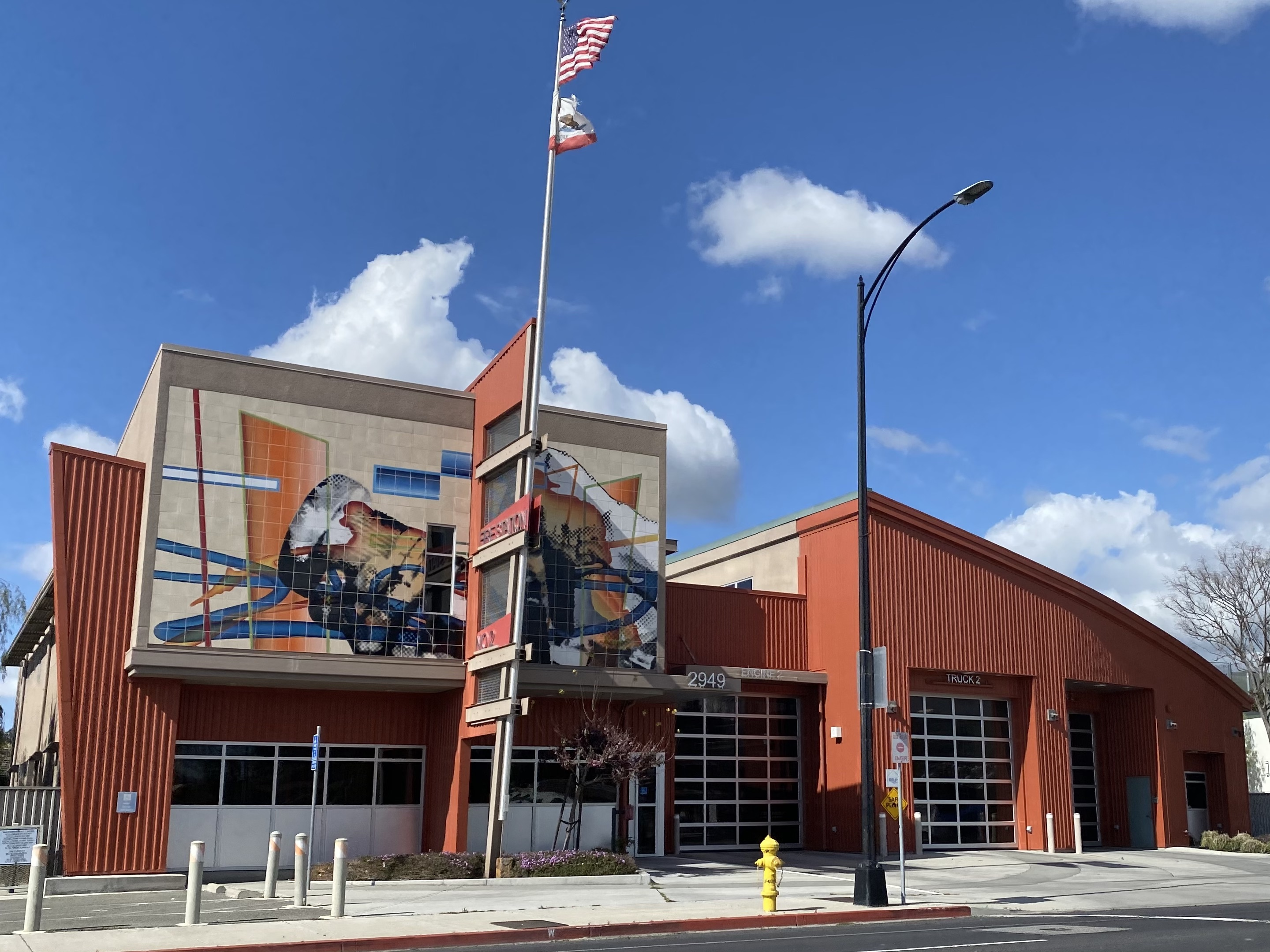
Station 2 of the San Jose Fire Department

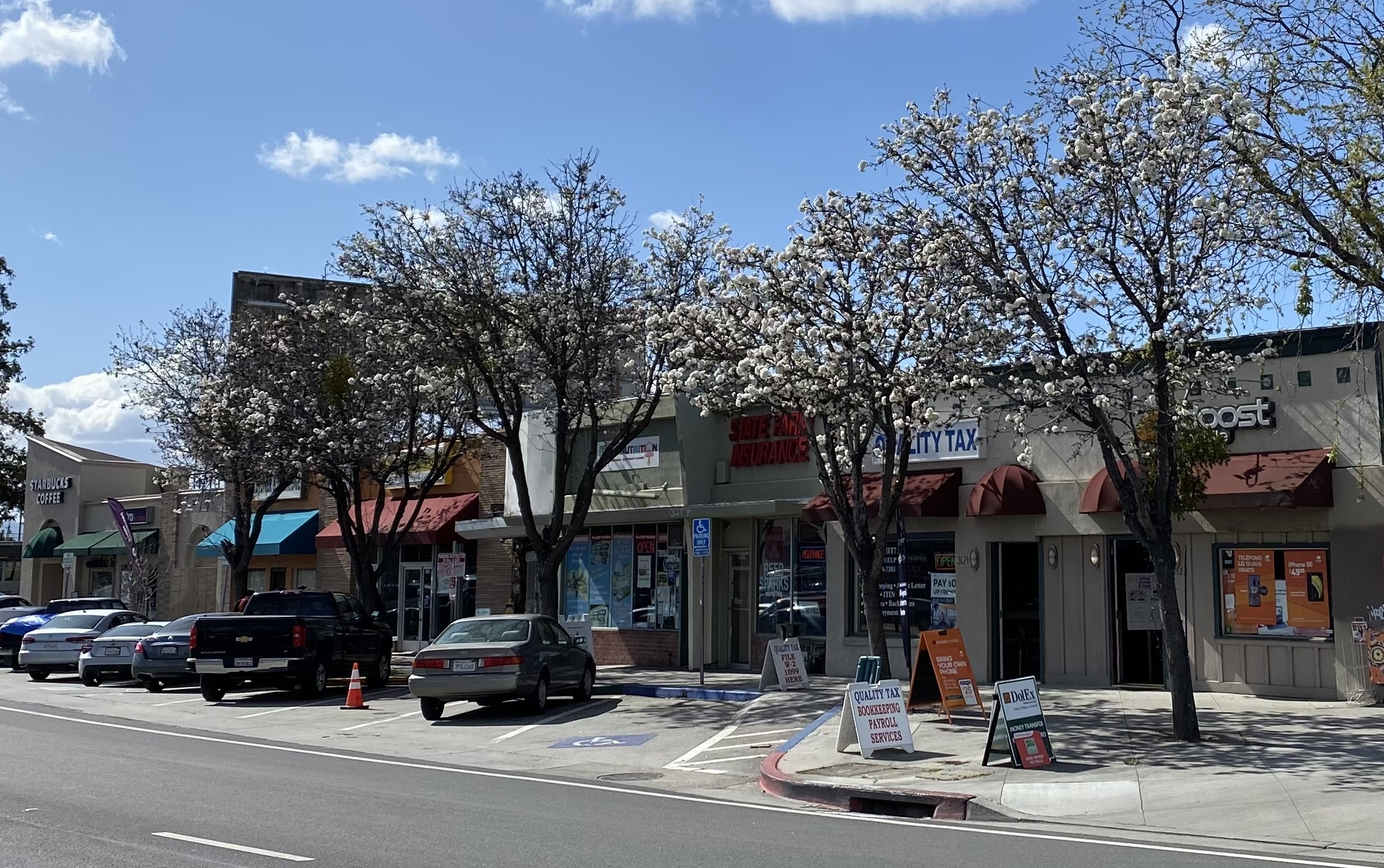
Alum Rock Village

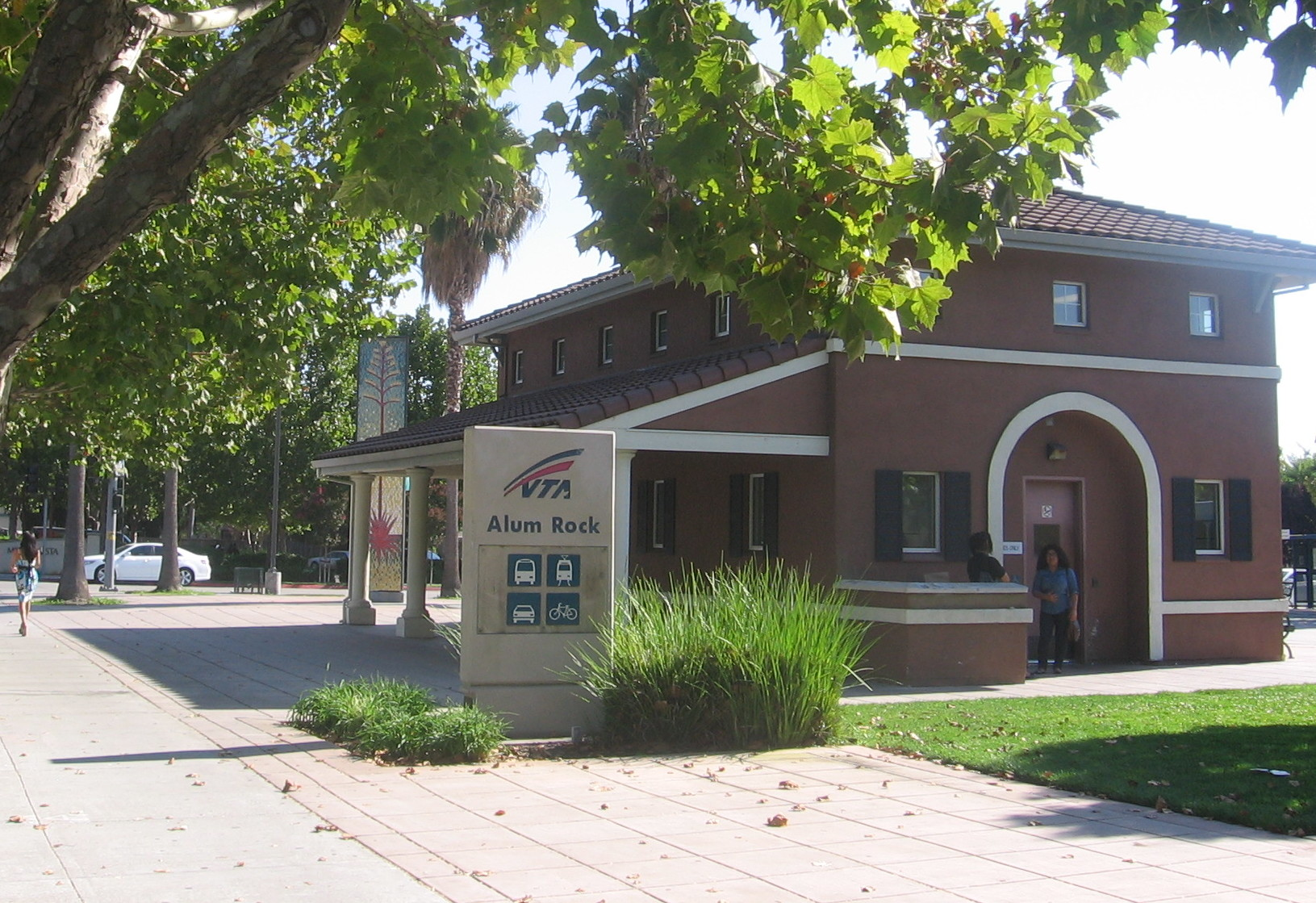
Alum Rock Transit Center
