= Sun Yat-Sen Memorial Hall =

Buildings named or similarly named Sun Yat-Sen Memorial Hall are located in:

- Sun Yat-sen Memorial Hall (Guangzhou)
- Sun Yat-sen Memorial Hall (Taipei)
- A building in the Chinese Cultural Garden in San Jose, California
- Sun Yat-sen Mausoleum in Nanjing
- Sun Yat Sen Nanyang Memorial Hall, a colonial-style villa and museum in Singapore
