= Don Reynolds =

Don or Donald Reynolds may refer to:

- Don Reynolds (baseball) (born 1953), American baseball player
- Don Reynolds (actor) (1937–2019), American child actor and animal trainer
- Don Reynolds (producer), producer of the film The Quiet Earth
- Donald W. Reynolds (1906–1993), American businessman and philanthropist
- Donn Reynolds (1921–1997), Canadian country music singer and songwriter
- Don Reynolds, Dino Spumoni's partner on Hey Arnold!
