= Jim Wilhelm =

American baseball player (born 1952)

- Outfielder
- Born: September 20, 1952 (age 73); San Rafael, California, U.S.
- Batted: Right Threw: Right

MLB debut
- September 4, 1978, for the San Diego Padres

Last MLB appearance
- September 30, 1979, for the San Diego Padres

MLB statistics
- Batting average: .262
- Home runs: 0
- Runs batted in: 12
- Stats at Baseball Reference

Teams
- San Diego Padres (1978–1979)

James Webster Wilhelm (born September 20, 1952) is an American former Major League Baseball outfielder, He threw & batted right-handed, stood 6 feet 3 inches (1.91 m) tall and weighed 190 pounds (86 kg).

Wilhelim was drafted by the San Diego Padres in the seventh round of the 1974 Major League Baseball draft out of Santa Clara University in Santa Clara, California. He spent five seasons in the Padres' farm system, batting .277 with 28 home runs & 269 runs batted in, when he received a September call up in 1978.

Making his major league debut in centerfield on September 4, Wilhelm doubled off the Atlanta Braves' Larry McWilliams, driving in two runs and putting the Padres ahead to stay in a game they would eventually win 8–4. Facing the Braves again two days later, his sacrifice fly drove in the game's winning run. All told, Wilhelm batted .368 (7-for-19) with two doubles & four RBIs for the season.

He split the 1979 season between Triple-A and the Padres. As the Padres' fourth outfielder, Wilhelm batted .243 with 8 RBIs. He batted .278 with 51 RBIs in just over half a season with the Hawaii Islanders.

Just prior to spring training in 1980, on February 15, Wilhelm was traded to the Cleveland Indians with pitcher Bob Owchinko for outfielder Jerry Mumphrey. Rather than report to the Indians, Wilhelm retired from the game at 27.

His final MLB totals included 49 games played, all with the Padres, with six doubles and three triples among his 32 MLB hits.
