= Mark Leon =

NASA researcher

- Born: 1962
- Died: April 2018; Sunnyvale, California
- Occupations: electrical engineer, civil servant
- Known for: MCing at many FIRST robotics competitions

Mark Leon (1962 – April 2018) was a former civil servant with NASA Ames Research Center. His primary work was in education and communication systems.

== Early life ==
Mark Leon grew up in a rather rough East San Jose neighborhood, and graduated from James Lick High School in 1980. He originally began taking a slightly more academic route to life when he began hiding in the library from other high school students who were attempting to beat him up.

He also attended San Jose State University and won a silver medal in the 1985 Collegiate National Judo Championships. He received his bachelor's degree in electrical engineering in 1986.

== Communications work ==
In the 1980s Leon was instrumental in establishing trans-Atlantic communication between American, French and English space agencies. In the 1990s he completed the first audio/video link to Antarctica. This was thought to be impossible at the time.

== Affiliation with FIRST Robotics ==
For many years Mark Leon worked as a Master of Ceremonies in many FIRST robotics competition events both on and off season. He was particularly well known for wearing a bright blue NASA coat and dying his hair the same color for these events and coined the phrase "Do the math, Save the world". He was widely cited as an inspiration to many high school students to build robots and impacted many career choices. He is also credited with the existence of a large number of FRC teams.

== Robotics Alliance Project ==
Beginning in 1998 Mark moved to the Robotics Alliance Project at NASA Ames. This department works primarily in educational and outreach projects and was estimated in 2006 to have reached more than 100,000 middle and high school students. He also ran the Ames Robotics Academy every summer.
