= Jim Beswick =

American baseball player (born 1958)

- Outfielder
- Born: February 12, 1958 (age 68); Wilkinsburg, Pennsylvania, U.S.
- Batted: Switch Threw: Right

MLB debut
- August 9, 1978, for the San Diego Padres

Last MLB appearance
- September 30, 1978, for the San Diego Padres

MLB statistics
- At bats: 20
- Hits: 1
- Batting average: .050
- Stats at Baseball Reference

Teams
- San Diego Padres (1978)

James William Beswick (born February 12, 1958) is an American former Major League Baseball outfielder who appeared in 17 games for the San Diego Padres in 1978. He was a switch hitter and threw right-handed.

== Career ==
Beswick was drafted by the San Diego Padres in the 5th round of the 1976 amateur draft and played that season for the Class A short-season Walla Walla Padres. He spent 1977 playing for the Class A Reno Silver Sox and most of 1978 with the Double-A Amarillo Gold Sox.

In August 1978, Beswick was called up to the major league club. He appeared in 17 games for the Padres, primarily as a pinch hitter and pinch runner. He was sent back to the minors following the season, and spent 1979–1981 playing for the Triple-A Hawaii Islanders.

In 1982 he signed with the California Angels organization and played for the Double-A Holyoke Millers and Nashua Angels. His American professional baseball career ended after the 1983 season at the age of 25.
