= James Lick High School =

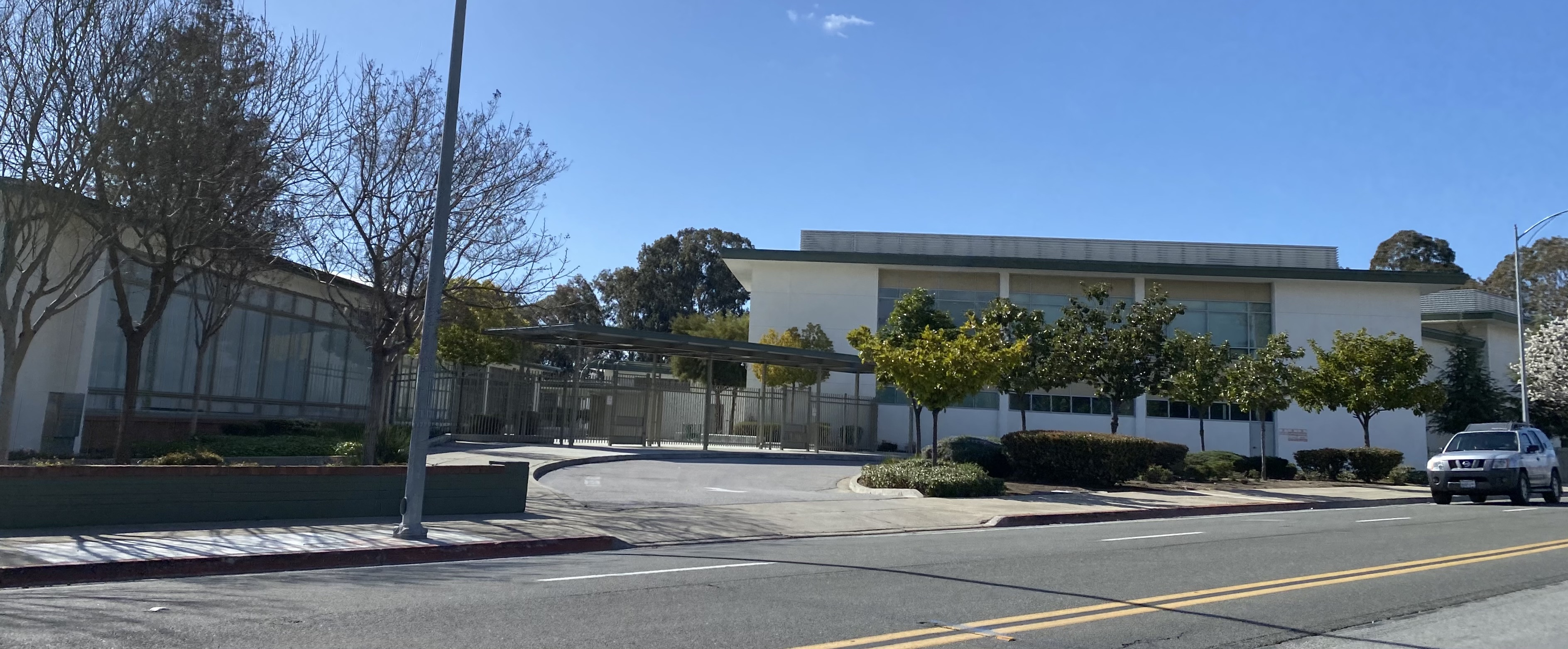

Location
- 57 North White Road; Santa Clara County; San Jose, California; United States; 37.367°N 121.83°W

Information
- School type: Public, Comprehensive
- Established: 1950, 76 years ago
- School district: East Side Union High School District
- Oversight: Western Association of Schools and Colleges
- Superintendent: Glenn VanderZee
- Principal: Carla Hernandez
- Staff: 43.79 (FTE)
- Grades: 9–12
- Age range: 13–18
- Enrollment: 862 (2024–2025)
- Student to teacher ratio: 19.68
- Campus: Suburban
- Area: Santa Clara County
- Colors: Hunter green and white
- Sports: Badminton, Baseball, Basketball, Cheerleading, Cross country, Flag football, Football, Soccer, Softball, Track and Field, Volleyball, Wrestling
- Mascot: Comet
- Nickname: JLHS, Lick
- Rival: Mt. Pleasant High School
- Yearbook: The Argus
- Athletics conference: California Interscholastic Federation Blossom Valley Athletic League
- Website: jameslick.esuhsd.org

James Lick High School is a public high school in San Jose, California, US, located in the Alum Rock district of East San Jose. The school is part of the East Side Union High School District.

== History ==
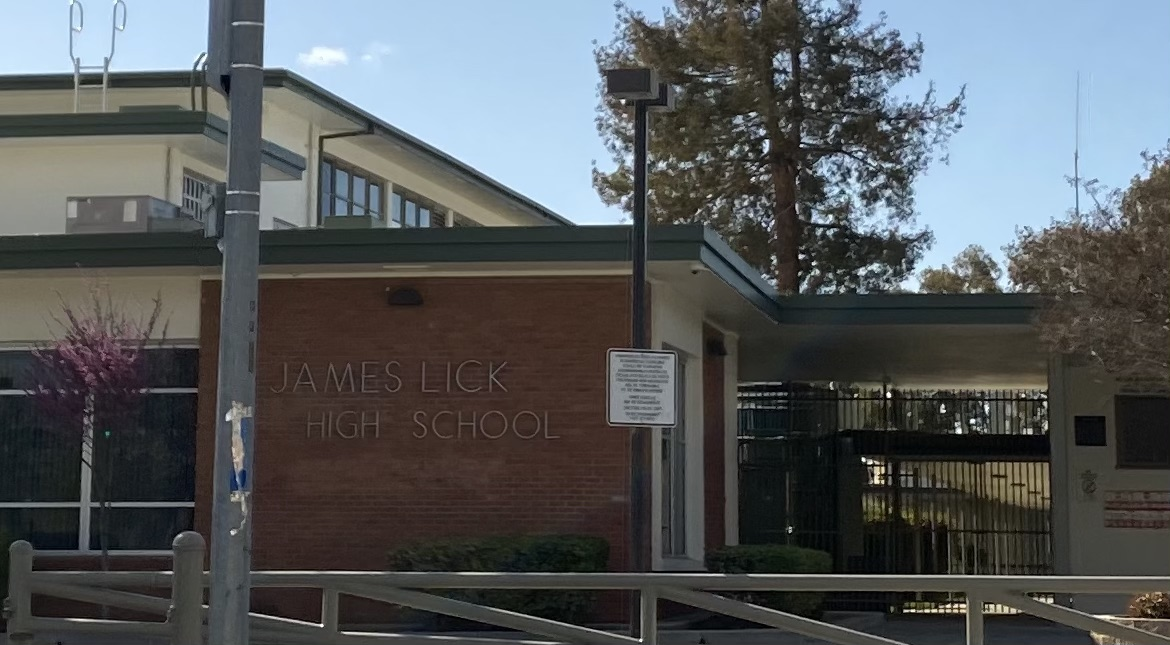
James Lick High School is named after Californian pioneer James Lick

The school opened in 1950 and was named after James Lick (1796–1876), a philanthropist associated with the Lick Observatory on Mount Hamilton. It was the first of eleven comprehensive high schools in its district. The surrounding area transitioned from orchards to residential housing over the decades. The land had been part of a proposed site for the city's airport in 1928.The school experienced a decline in academic performance during the 1990s and was designated an underperforming school in 1999. Economic changes in the area affected enrollment and performance indicators into the early 2010s. For many years after its opening, James Lick was viewed as the "jewel" at the base of the foothills.

The community surrounding James Lick changed much in the subsequent decades, as orchards were replaced with apartment complexes and single family homes. As the community changed, so did the make-up of its student body. After decades as a recognized leader among comprehensive high schools, it entered a period of decline. In the 1990s, a high rate of turnover developed in the school's population and standardized scores declined precipitously.

In 1999, James Lick was declared "an underperforming school". Many families, concerned about academic quality and issues of school safety, removed their students by way of the "No Child Left Behind" legislation. The surrounding area, during the economic decline of recent years, became a haven for families seeking affordable places to live. Concurrently, many first-time homeowners found themselves in the county's epicenter of foreclosure. Even after some easing of that housing crisis, the neighborhood of James Lick High School still held Santa Clara County's top foreclosure rate out of 226 neighborhoods in 2012.

== Athletics ==
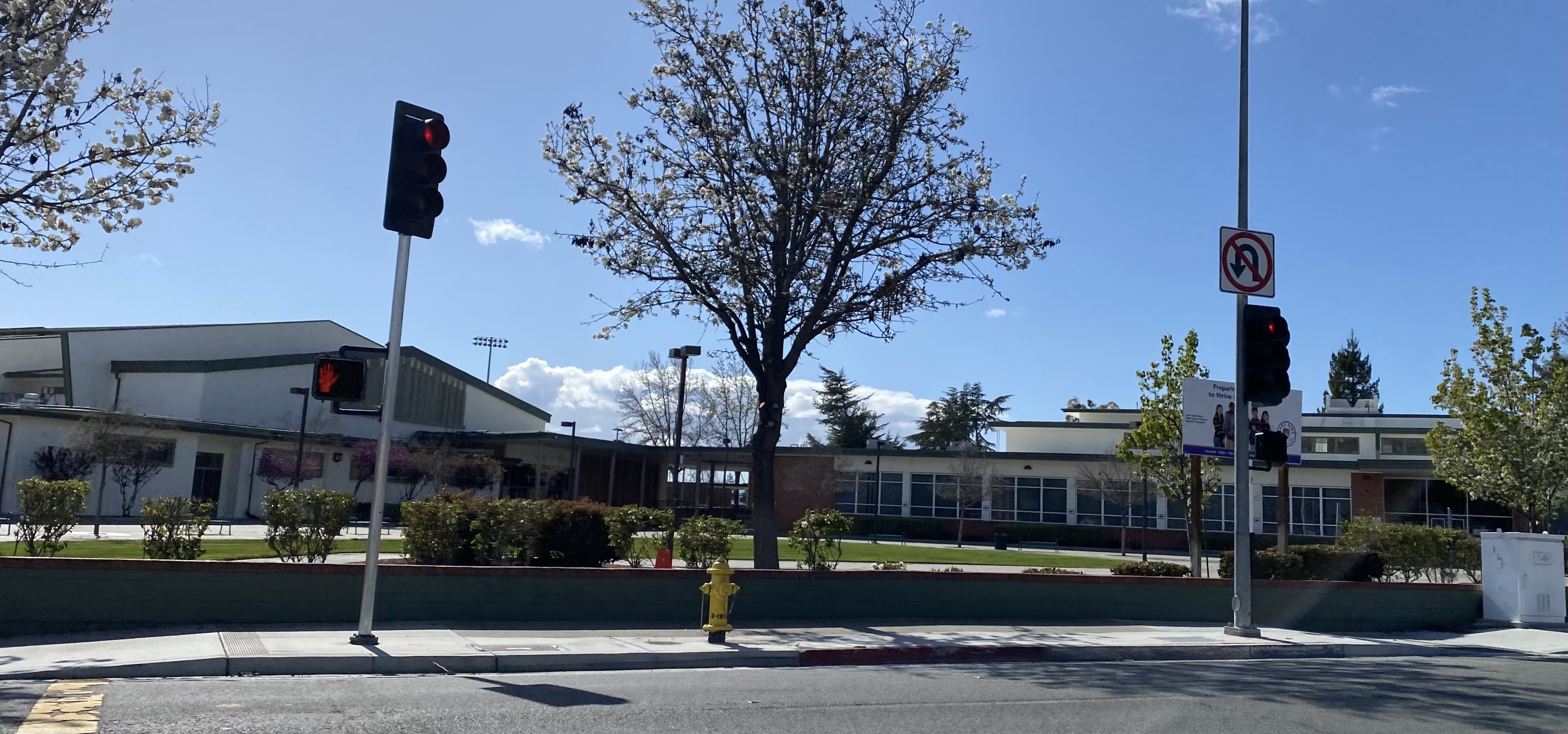
James Lick High is located in the heart of San Jose's Alum Rock district

As of the 2025–2026 school year, the school offers 12 sports.

- Badminton
- Baseball
- Basketball
- Cheerleading
- Cross country
- Flag football
- Football
- Soccer
- Softball
- Track and field
- Volleyball
- Wrestling

== Academic ==
Academic Performance Index (API) scores improved from 588 in the 2006–07 school year to 674 in 2011–12 . As of 2013 consistent with James Lick's recovered vision of moving all students forward to success, its ongoing focus is on all learning communities—to meet them where they are and move them toward greater achievement.

=== AP courses ===
According to U.S. News & World Report in 2025, the Advanced Placement (AP) participation rate is 61%. The AP participation passing rate is 25%.

=== Testing at James Lick ===
Student performance on the California High School Exit Exam has improved notably at James Lick High School. Students are prepared via support classes, after-school support and targeted instruction to CAHSEE standards in order to test proficient on the exam as sophomores. In 2011–12, 76% of students taking the mathematics portion of the CAHSEE passed, a 16% increase from the 2006–07 passing rate of 60%. Among students taking the English portion of the CAHSEE, 74% passed in 2011–12, a 14% increase from the 2006–07 passing rate of 60%.

=== Fire Safety Pathway Vocational Program ===
The school's Fire Service Pathway prepares participants for entry-level positions in the fire protective industry such as fire fighter, emergency medical technician, paramedic, fire inspector and fire investigator. After successful completion of the fire service pathway and graduation, students have the opportunity to:

- Attend a CSU/UC campus to pursue a bachelor's degree
- Attend community college to pursue an associate degree
- Attend other certification programs
- Apply for an apprenticeship opportunity

Program Highlights

- CPAT Training
- Fieldtrips
- Wilderness First Aid
- CSU Eligibility
- CPR First Aid Certification
- Fire Service Networking
- Community Involvement
- Emergency Medical Technician Test Preparation and Certification
- Post-Secondary Employment Opportunities

== Demographics ==
James Lick High School serves working class and predominantly low-income, first and second-generation immigrant families. In 2011–12, 46% of students submitted qualifying applications for the free and reduced lunch program, although the actual percentage of low-income families is much higher. Stigma regarding free and reduced lunch status, as well as concerns regarding "documentation", affect this reported percentage. Between 2006–07 and 2011–12, enrollment grew from 1,055 to 1,416 and student achievement grew from 588 to 674 API points, confirming that just as a community changes over 60 years, so can a school enhance its instructional delivery and services, honoring the demands and goals of those it serves. The James Lick staff continues to embrace this challenge.

In the 2006–07 school year, out of 1,055 students, 77.1% were of Hispanic descent, 8.3% White, 7.4% Asian, 4.1% Filipino, 2.1% African American and 0.5% American Indian.

In the 2011–12 school year, out of 1,416 students, 74% of all students were of Hispanic descent, 7% White, 15% Asian, 2% African American and 1% American Indian.

In the 2024–2025 school year, out of 862 students, 83.9% were of Hispanic descent, 7.1% Asian, 3.2% Filipino, 2.8% White, 1.5% African American, 0.8% Pacific Islander, 0.3% American Indian, and 0.3% were two or more races.

== Controversy ==
In April 2018, the school proposed cutting its physics science program for the 2018–2019 school year and letting students interested in taking that class look at other high schools. This would prevent graduates from being accepted to University of California colleges that recommend students have three years of core science (physics, chemistry and biology). A petition to reverse the decision was started by members of the Northern California/ Nevada Section of the American Association of Physics Teachers.

== Graduation ==
The emphasis on graduation and moving on to post-high school success has increased, along with the percentage of seniors who graduate. 2012 was the first year since 2004 when over 200 seniors graduated. The number of students meeting A-G requirements hit a new high in 2011–12 with 93 students eligible, 73 of whom applied and were accepted by four-year colleges and universities.

While the percentage of seniors graduating from James Lick High School has increased, the one- and four-year dropout rates for students must be acknowledged. Since the 2007–08 school year, ever-fewer students have dropped out. In 2009–10, the one-year dropout rate was 3.3% and the four-year rate was 16.4%. Credit recovery programs, scheduling supports and summer programs allow students to earn additional credits during the last two years of their enrollment at James Lick.

== Notable alumni ==
- Leon Donohue, NFL offensive lineman
- Forrest Fezler, PGA Tour golfer
- Chon Gallegos, NFL quarterback
- Paul Hait, Gold-medal winning swimmer in the 1960 Summer Olympics in Rome.
- Melissa Haro, Sports Illustrated Swimsuit Issue model
- Mark Leon, Robotics Alliance Project, NASA Ames Research Center
- Dan Lloyd, NFL linebacker
- Roger Maltbie, professional golfer and sportscaster
- Patricia Moreno, spiritual and fitness teacher
- Jim Plunkett, NFL quarterback and Heisman Trophy winner
- Luis Valdez, playwright and film director
- Jeanne Wakatsuki Houston, author of Farewell to Manzanar
- Tony Castillo, MLB catcher

== See also ==
- Santa Clara County high schools
