= Overfelt Gardens =

Park in California, United States

Coordinates: 37.363029°N 121.853528°W

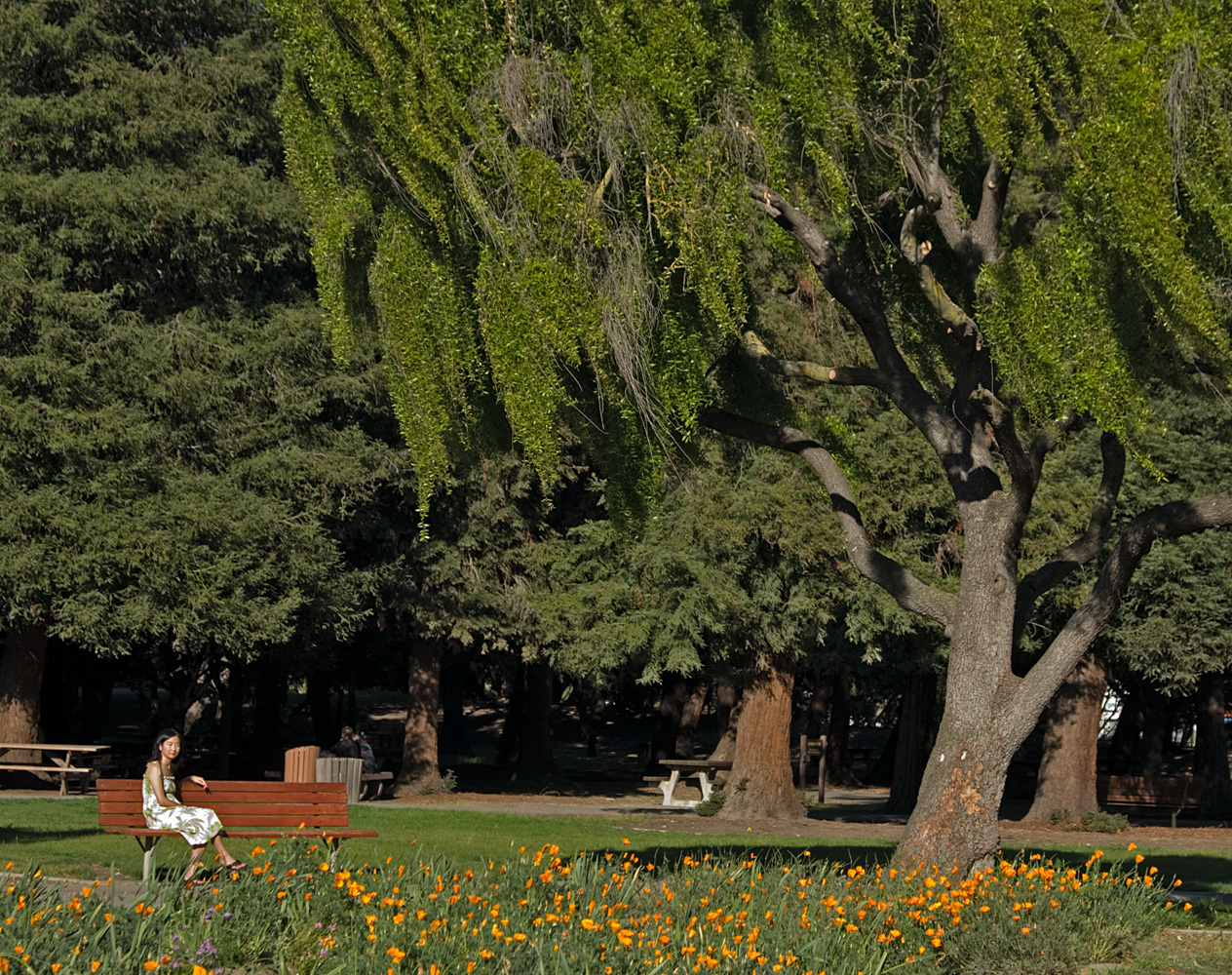
- Overfelt Gardens

- Location within San Jose, California Location within San Francisco Bay Area
- Location: San Jose, California
- Area: 32.6 acres (13.2 ha)
- Created: 1966
- Open: daily, 8:30 A.M. to sunset
- Website: Official site

Overfelt Gardens are a 33-acre (13 ha) park in San Jose, California, located in the Alum Rock district of East San Jose.

== History ==
The land for the park was donated by Mildred Overfelt in 1959, in memory of her parents, William and Mary Overfelt, early San Jose pioneers that started grain and dairy farms in the 1850s. Mildred specified the park was intended "to provide a place of rest, relaxation, aesthetic, and other enjoyment for the people of San Jose" and no sports fields or games were to be constructed. It was opened in 1966.

== Park features ==
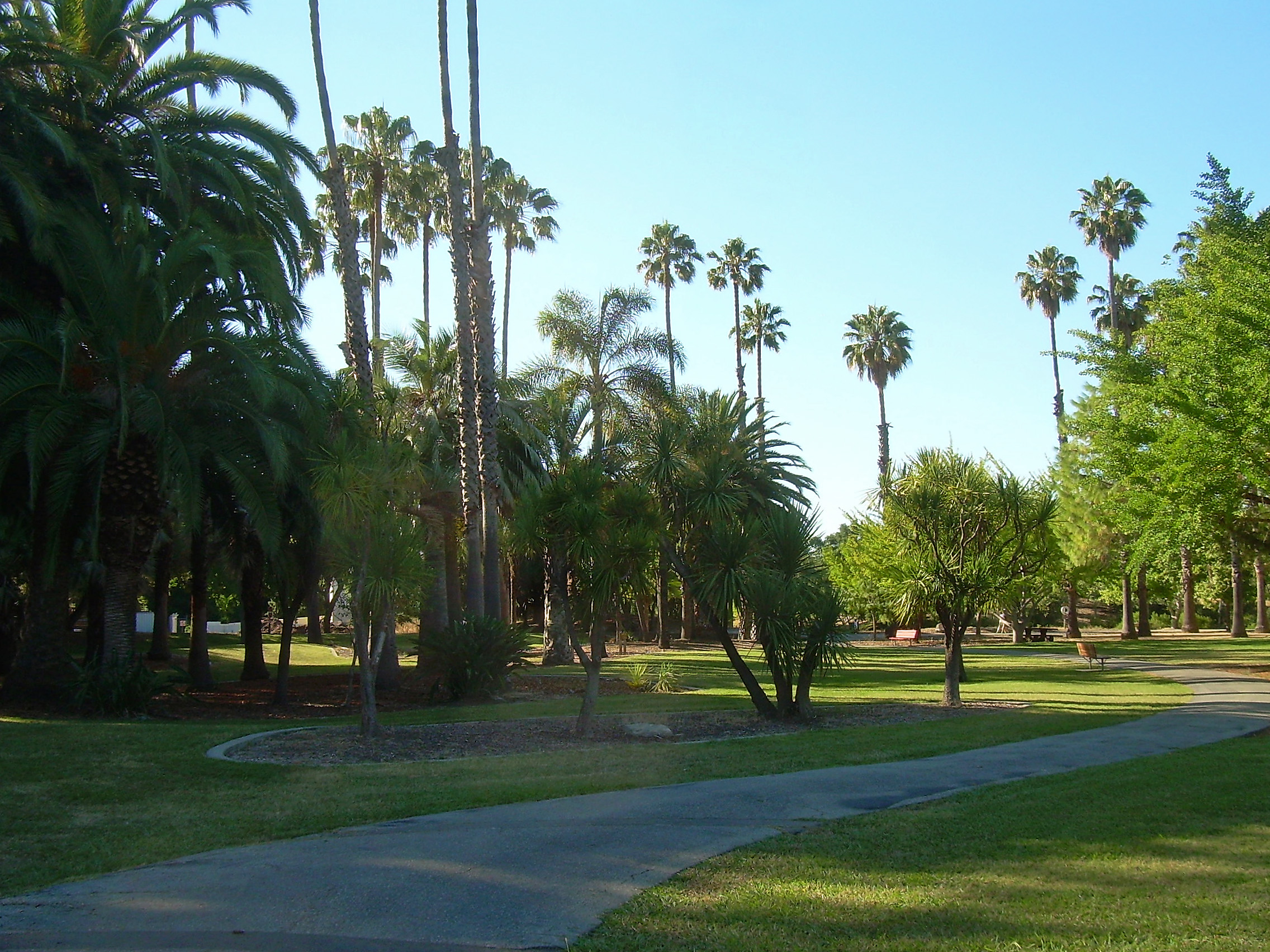
Field of palms.

Early features added to the park include picnic areas, restrooms, a fountain dedicated to Mildred, and a "fragrance garden" comprising many aromatic plants. Later paths were added around the rest of the park and its three lakes, with a section designated as a California Native plant and Wildlife Sanctuary. Three large, interconnected percolation ponds rise and shrink throughout the year, providing habitat for birds, reptiles, amphibians, mammals and fish year-round. A large statue of the famous Chinese philosopher Confucius overlooks a shallow reflection pond that, when full, spills into a narrow streambed. Also, the California Wild area is a 1.6-acre (0.65 ha) wildlife sanctuary composed of a dirt trail winding around a hill covered in native trees, brush, wildflowers and grasses. A paved walking trail meanders around the remainder of the park over gently sloping hills, around a reflection pond emptying into a small stream, past cultural points of interest and around three percolation ponds. The current park map shows these trails as thick white lines.

The southeast section of the park includes the Chinese Cultural Garden, commemorating Sun Yat-sen, Chiang Kai-shek, Confucius, and Chinese culture in general, including a large black stone, mined and shipped from Taiwan.

== Location ==
Overfelt Gardens is located on McKee Road in East San Jose. Independence High School lies just to its north.
