= Tony Castillo (catcher) =

American baseball player

- Catcher
- Born: June 14, 1957 (age 67); San Jose, California
- Batted: Right Threw: Right

MLB debut
- September 22, 1978, for the San Diego Padres

Last MLB appearance
- October 1, 1978, for the San Diego Padres

MLB statistics
- At bats: 8
- Hits: 1
- Runs batted in: 1
- Stats at Baseball Reference

Teams
- San Diego Padres (1978)

Anthony Castillo Beltran (born June 14, 1957 in San Jose, California) is a retired American professional baseball player, a former catcher who played in five Major League games for the San Diego Padres during the 1978 season. He threw and batted right-handed, stood 6 feet 4 inches (1.93 m) tall and weighed 190 pounds (86 kg).

== Career ==
Drafted in the third round from James Lick High School in San Jose by the Padres in the 1975 Major League Baseball draft, Castillo was recalled from the Double-A Amarillo Gold Sox after the 1978 minor league season, Castillo started three games at catcher for the Padres among his five MLB games. On September 29, he started against the Los Angeles Dodgers at San Diego's Jack Murphy Stadium and collected his only MLB hit, an RBI single off Burt Hooton, to score eventual Hall of Famer Dave Winfield. His one hit in eight at bats earned Castillo a .125 lifetime batting average.

Castillo returned to the minors for good in 1979 and played six seasons at the Triple-A level before retiring.
