= Leon Donohue =

American football player (1939–2016)

- Donohue in 1964

No. 72, 62
- Positions: Guard, tackle

Personal information
- Born: March 25, 1939; Star City, Arkansas, U.S.
- Died: August 11, 2016 (aged 77); Redding, California, U.S.
- Listed height: 6 ft 4 in (1.93 m)
- Listed weight: 245 lb (111 kg)

Career information
- High school: James Lick (San Jose, California)
- College: San Jose State
- NFL draft: 1961: 9th round, 118th overall pick
- AFL draft: 1962: 29th round, 225th overall pick

Career history

Playing
- San Francisco 49ers (1962–1964); Dallas Cowboys (1965–1968); Detroit Lions (1969)*
- * Offseason or practice squad member only

Coaching
- Shasta (1971–1976) Line coach; Shasta (1977–1987) Head coach; Shasta (1992–1995) Head coach; Shasta (1996) Assistant head coach

Awards and highlights
- NFL All-rookie team (1962)

Career NFL statistics
- Games played: 84
- Games started: 75
- Fumble recoveries: 3
- Stats at Pro Football Reference

Head coaching record
- Career: 73–78–1 (.484)

Leon Donohue (March 25, 1939 – August 11, 2016) was an American professional football offensive guard in the National Football League (NFL) for the San Francisco 49ers and Dallas Cowboys. He played college football for the San Jose State Spartans. Donohue was selected by the 49ers in the ninth round of the 1961 NFL draft and by the Oakland Raiders in the 29th round of the 1962 AFL draft.

== Early life ==
Donohue attended James Lick High School, where he played football and basketball. He was named All-City in both sports.

He accepted a football scholarship from San Jose State University. As a sophomore, he was converted from end into a tackle and became a starter.

He was inducted into the San Jose State Sports Hall of Fame and the East Side Unified School District of San Jose Hall of Fame. In 1995, he was named to the San Jose State Football's "All-Century Team" by the San Jose Mercury News.

== Professional career ==
=== San Francisco 49ers ===
Donohue was selected by the San Francisco 49ers as a future draft pick in the ninth round (118th overall) of the 1961 NFL draft, which allowed them to draft him one year before his college eligibility was over. He was also selected by the Oakland Raiders of the American Football League in the 29th round (225th overall) of the 1962 AFL draft. In his second year he was named the regular starter at right guard.

On September 6, 1965, he was traded to the Dallas Cowboys in exchange for a third round selection (#37-Al Randolph).

=== Dallas Cowboys ===
Donohue was the starter at right guard during three seasons and was especially strong in pass protection. He was a part of the 1967 NFL Championship Game famously known as the "Ice Bowl", where the Green Bay Packers beat the Cowboys, 21–17.

After playing with a bad knee in 1967, he had off-season surgery. He couldn't recover well enough from the knee injury and was placed on the injured reserve list during the 1968 season. On July 21, 1969, he was traded to the Detroit Lions in exchange for a draft selection (not exercised).

=== Detroit Lions ===
In 1969, the Detroit Lions acquired Donohue to improve their depth at the offensive line, but he was not able to make the team due to problems with his knee and retired.

== Coaching career and honors ==
Donohue became a football, wrestling and tennis coach at Shasta College in Redding. In 1977, he was named the football head coach and went on to win or share four league titles. He retired after the 1995 season and was inducted into the Shasta College Sports Hall of Fame in 2002. He also was inducted into the Shasta County Hall of Fame. He died on August 11, 2016.

== Head coaching record ==
Year	Team	Overall	Conference	Standing	Bowl/playoffs
Shasta Knights (Golden Valley Conference) (1977–1986)
1977	Shasta	3–7	1–5	6th	
1978	Shasta	6–4	5–1	T–1st	L California JC Division II semifinal
1979	Shasta	2–8	1–4	6th	
1980	Shasta	4–6	4–3	3rd	
1981	Shasta	6–4	4–2	T–2nd	
1982	Shasta	4–5	3–3	T–3rd	
1983	Shasta	8–3	6–0	1st	L Merced Elks Bowl
1984	Shasta	1–9	0–6	7th	
1985	Shasta	5–5	4–2	T–2nd	
1986	Shasta	7–4	2–1	T–1st	L Lions Bowl
Shasta Knights (Bay Valley Conference) (1987)
1987	Shasta	10–1	9–0	1st	L Lions Bowl
Shasta Knights (Golden Valley Conference) (1992–1994)
1992	Shasta	5–5	3–3	3rd	
1993	Shasta	1–8–1	0–6	4th	
1994	Shasta	6–4	5–3	2nd	
Shasta Knights (NorCal Football Conference) (1995)
1995	Shasta	5–5	3–4	5th (Golden)	
Shasta:		73–78–1	50–37		
Total:		73–78–1			
National championship Conference title Conference division title or championship game berth
