= Patricia Moreno (teacher) =

American spiritual and fitness teacher

Patricia Esperanza Moreno (August 14, 1964 – January 22, 2022) was an American spiritual and fitness teacher.

== Biography ==
Moreno was born in San Jose, California, in 1964, to Jose Moreno, a lawyer, and Edith Salcido Moreno, a restaurant owner. Patricia was one of eleven siblings. She completed her education at James Lick High School and later attended San Jose State University. After relocating to New York, she worked as a kickboxing instructor at Equinox gym.

In 2002, Moreno developed intenSati, a fitness approach that integrated exercise with mindfulness techniques. The program's name combines "intention" with the Buddhist term "sati," which means awareness.

In 2006, Moreno met Dr. Mori, a dentist, during one of her intenSati classes in Manhattan. They married in 2008.

Moreno died at the age of 57 in Los Angeles.
