= Chuck Baker =

American baseball player (born 1952)

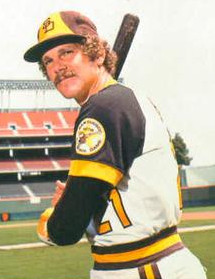
- Baker in 1978
- Utility infielder
- Born: December 6, 1952 (age 73); Seattle, Washington, U.S.
- Batted: Right Threw: Right

MLB debut
- April 7, 1978, for the San Diego Padres

Last MLB appearance
- October 4, 1981, for the Minnesota Twins

MLB statistics
- Batting average: .185
- Home runs: 0
- Runs batted in: 9
- Stats at Baseball Reference

Teams
- San Diego Padres (1978, 1980); Minnesota Twins (1981)

Charles Joseph Baker (born December 6, 1952) is an American former middle infielder and third baseman in Major League Baseball who played for the San Diego Padres and Minnesota Twins in parts of three seasons spanning 1978–1981. Listed at 5' 11", 180 lb., he batted and threw right handed.

Born in Seattle, Washington, Baker was signed by the San Diego organization out of Loyola Marymount University, where he earned a degree in engineering. He was selected in the second round of the 1975 MLB draft with the 43rd overall pick. Previously, he had been drafted by the Twins (1971), Kansas City Royals (1973) and Houston Astros (1974), but was never able to come to terms on a contract.

Baker entered the Majors in 1978 with the Padres, returning with them in 1979 before joining the Twins (1981) as part of a transaction for Dave Edwards.

In a three-year career, Baker posted a batting average of .185 (27-for-146) in 93 games, including two doubles and three triples, driving in nine runs while scoring 14 times.

He also played five seasons in the Minor Leagues between 1975 and 1980, hitting .251 with 33 home runs and 254 RBI in 565 games.

Baker played winter baseball with the Leones del Caracas club of the Venezuelan League during the 1977–1979 seasons.
