= Don Reynolds (baseball) =

American baseball player (born 1953)

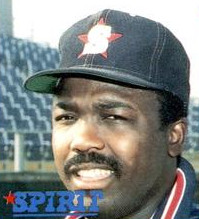
- Reynolds in 1988
- Outfielder
- Born: April 16, 1953 (age 73); Arkadelphia, Arkansas, U.S.
- Batted: Right Threw: Right

MLB debut
- April 7, 1978, for the San Diego Padres

Last MLB appearance
- September 30, 1979, for the San Diego Padres

MLB statistics
- Batting average: .242
- Home runs: 0
- Runs batted in: 16
- Stats at Baseball Reference

Teams
- San Diego Padres (1978–1979)

Donald Edward Reynolds (born April 16, 1953) is an American former professional baseball player. He played in Major League Baseball (MLB) as an outfielder for the San Diego Padres from 1978 to 1979. His younger brother Harold Reynolds was also a Major League Baseball player.

== Biography ==
=== Early life ===
Reynolds was born in Arkadelphia, Arkansas, and was raised in Corvallis, Oregon. Don attended Corvallis High School in Corvallis, Oregon, starring in football, basketball and baseball. He was a member of the 3A State Championship football team in 1970. He graduated from Corvallis High in 1971.

=== College ===
Reynolds initially went to the University of Oregon with the sole intent of playing baseball only. At 5'8" and 178lbs, many coaches believed he was not built to play major college football. Oregon Duck football coach Jerry Frei managed to talk Reynolds into playing on the freshman football team in the fall of 1971, where he dominated on both sides of the ball. Reynolds would go on to be one of the nation’s top two-sport athletes in the mid-1970s.

In football, he paced Oregon in rushing three straight seasons, averaged 8.1 yards per carry as a sophomore and gained more than 1,000 yards as a junior, only the second in the school’s history to surpass that figure at the time. As a three-year starter and all-conference performer in baseball, he finished with seven career records, including hits, runs batted in and stolen bases. He batted .315 for his career and was drafted by the San Diego Padres after his Oregon career.

Reynolds was inducted into the University of Oregon Athletics Hall of Fame in 1993 as a football player.

=== Professional career ===
Following his outstanding collegiate career, Reynolds was selected by the San Diego Padres in the 18th round (410th overall pick) of the 1975 MLB June Amateur Draft. His dual-sport background, though a mark of rare athletic achievement, created some complications in the professional football landscape. No such obstacles existed in baseball, however, where his reputation as a pure hitter and outfielder spoke for itself.

=== Minor League Development (1975-1977) ===
Reynolds progressed rapidly through the Padres’ minor league system. His early professional statistics were outstanding:

Year	Team / Level	G	HR	RBI	AVG	OBP	SLG
1975	Walla Walla (A)	--	15	61	.319	.452	.563
1976	Amarillo (AA)	--	19	85	--	.436	.532
1977	Hawaii Islanders (AAA)	--	--	--	.368	--	--

His .368 batting average at Triple-A Hawaii in 1977 was sufficient to earn him a spot on the Padres’ major league roster out of spring training in 1978.

=== Major League Career - San Diego Padres (1978–1979) ===
Reynolds made his Major League Baseball debut on April 7, 1978, at the age of 24, becoming the 14,002nd player in major league history. He appeared in games for the San Diego Padres across two seasons, serving as an outfielder and pinch hitter. His first major league base hit came on April 11, 1978, in Atlanta against the Braves — a clean single off Hall of Fame knuckleballer Phil Niekro in the top of the eighth inning. The hit scored teammates Jerry Turner and Gene Richards, providing the go-ahead runs in a 3–2 San Diego victory.

The 1978 Padres roster featured future Hall of Famer Dave Winfield in the outfield alongside Reynolds, providing him both a formidable teammate and stiff competition for playing time. Reynolds played a role player’s role in both seasons, picking up spot starts and shuttling between the major league club and Triple-A Hawaii. His final MLB appearance was September 30, 1979, against the San Francisco Giants.

Season	Team	G	AB	H	RBI	R	SB
1978	San Diego Padres	8	16	3	2	2	0
1979	San Diego Padres	89	116	29	14	12	1
Career	2 Seasons	97	132	32	16	14	1
