= Chinese Cultural Garden =

Coordinates: 37.363029°N 121.853528°W

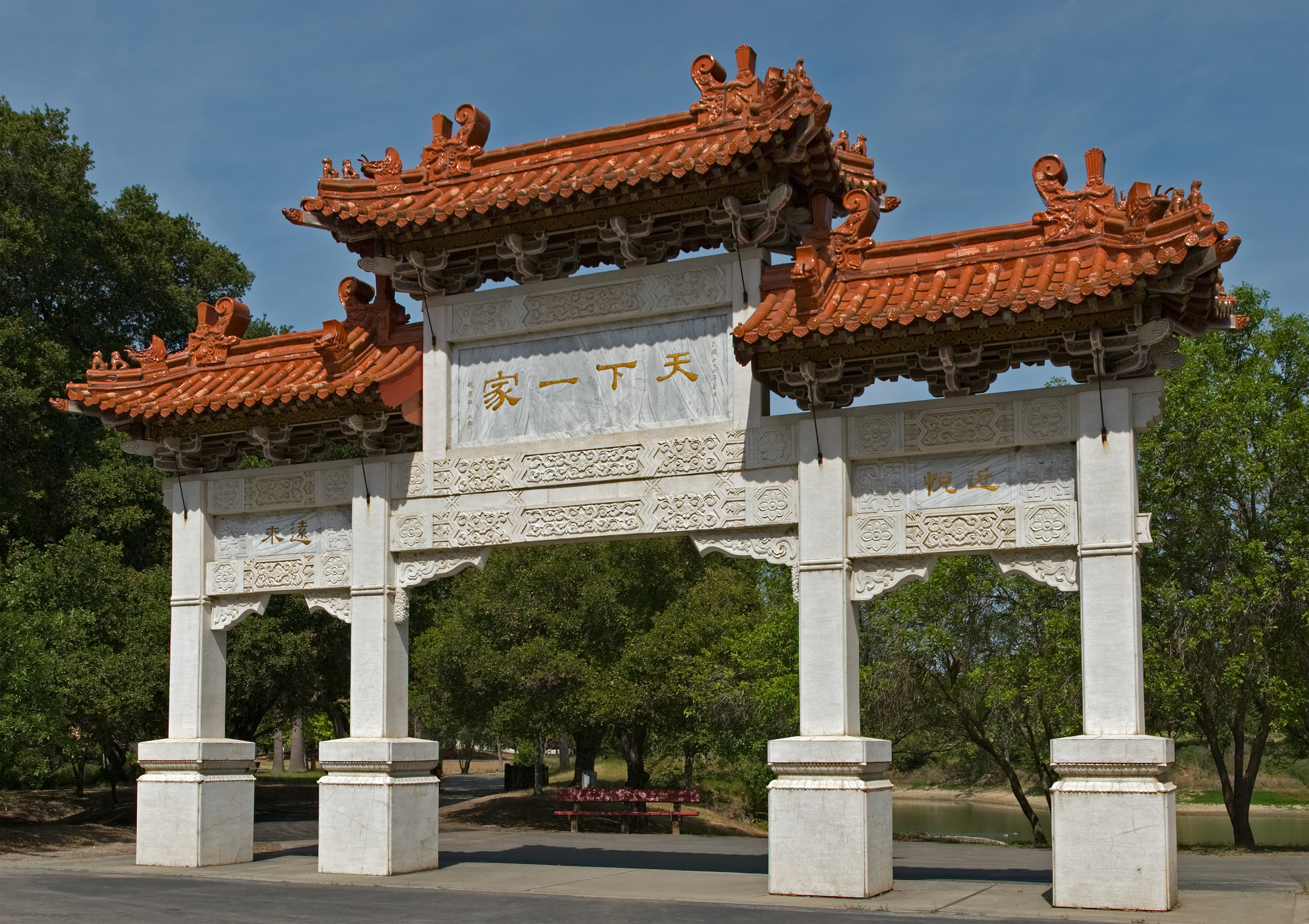
- The large Friendship Gate at Overfelt Gardens
- Interactive map of Chinese Cultural Garden
- Location: San Jose, California
- Area: 6 acres (2.4 ha)
- Created: 1971
- Founder: Frank Lowe, Pauline Lowe, Dr. Chen Li-Fu
- Open: Tuesday–Sunday, 1000–sunset
- Website: http://www.chineseculturalgarden.org

The Chinese Cultural Garden is a 6 acres (24,000 m^{2}) section of Overfelt Gardens, in San Jose, California, located in East San Jose. The addition of the Chinese Cultural Garden to Overfelt is primarily the work of Chinese immigrant Frank Lowe, his wife Pauline (who serves as park docent), and Dr. Chen Li-Fu of Taiwan.

== Features and events ==
Features include an ornamental Friendship Gate, the Sun Yat-Sen Memorial Hall, the Chiang Kai-shek Pavilion, a large statue of Confucius, the Plum Pavilion, a sundial, and a carved, 15 ton black marble stone, mined and shipped from the Republic of China (Taiwan), donated by Tainan, one of San Jose's sister cities.

The Friendship Gate is 50 feet (15 m) wide and 40 feet (12 m) tall, dedicated in July 1977. Materials, including 500-year-old juniper wood, were sourced from China. The characters written above the central portal are read right to left as: Chinese: 天下一家; pinyin: tiānxià yījiā; lit. 'All under heaven are one family'.

The Sun Yat-sen Memorial Hall is constructed from marble, bronze, and mahogany and was built in Taiwan, disassembled, then shipped and reassembled in San Jose. It features a ceramic tile roof weighing almost twenty tons.

The large black stone is a gift from Tainan and is at least one million years old. It was placed in Overfelt Gardens on 10 October 1980, marking the Chinese day of independence from Imperial rule. The large red carved characters on the rock are 忠孝; Zhōng Xiào, meaning loyalty.

On the third Sunday of September, the park celebrates the Chinese Moon Festival. It is primarily an event to showcase Asian performing arts, but also has arts and crafts for children and promotional booths from non-profit organizations, such as Cityteam and the San José Police Department.

== Gallery ==
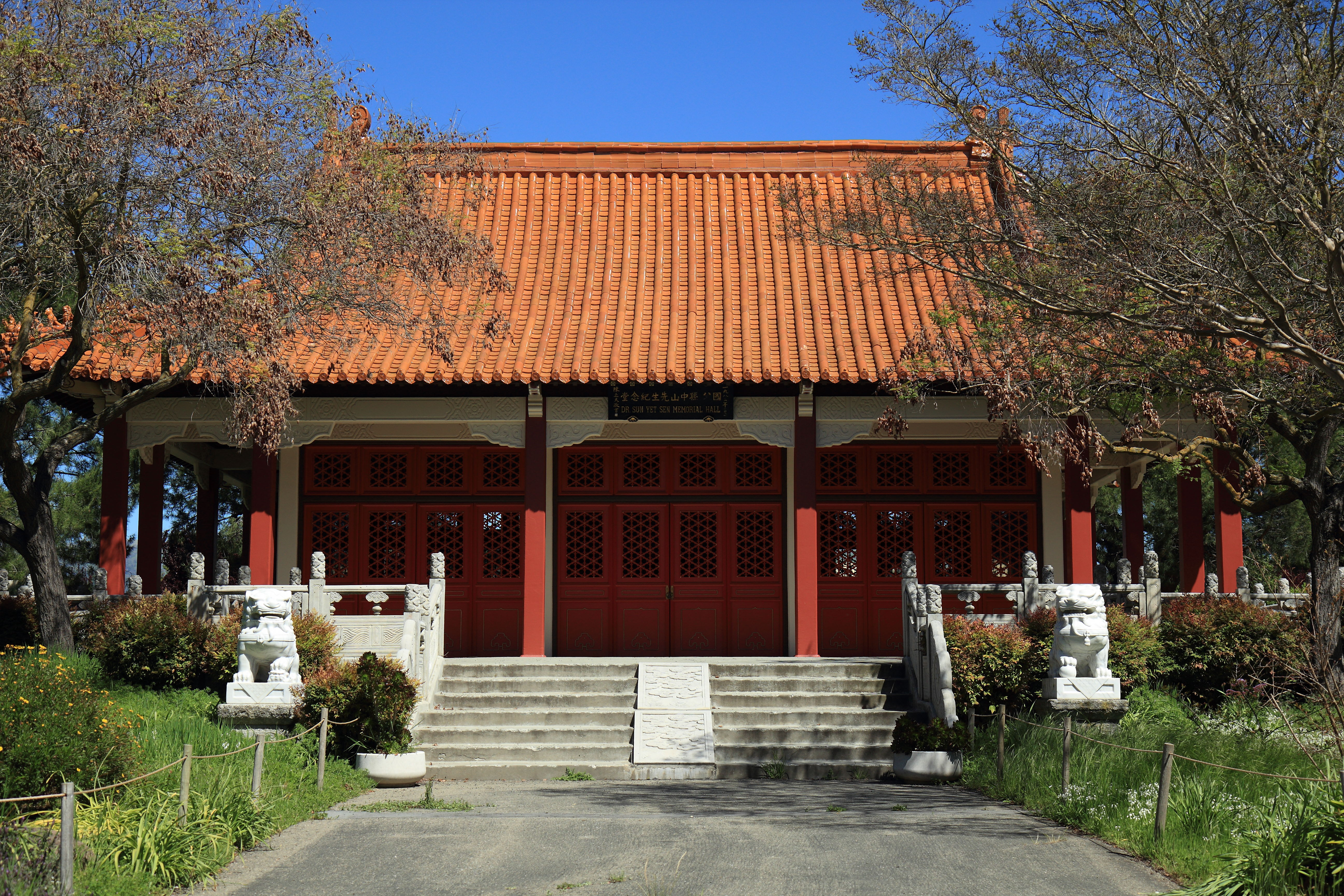
Sun Yat-sen Memorial Hall

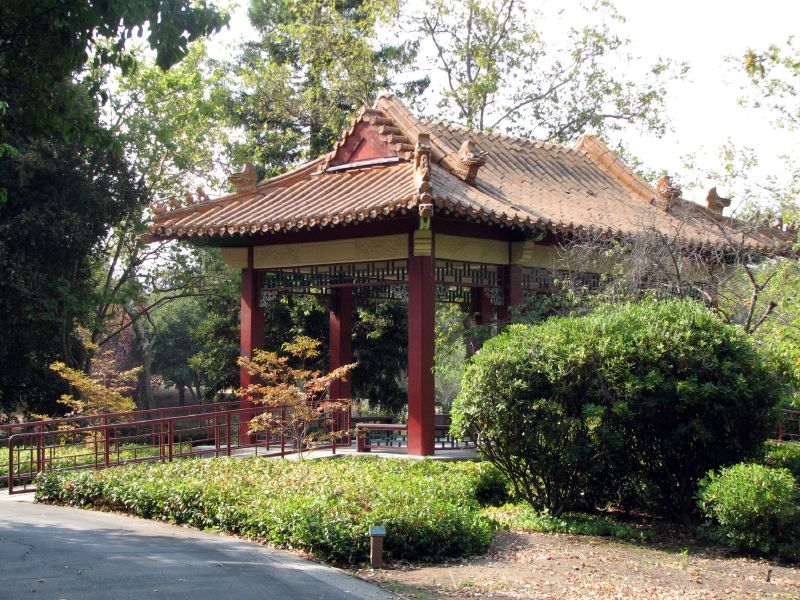
Chiang Kai-shek Pavilion

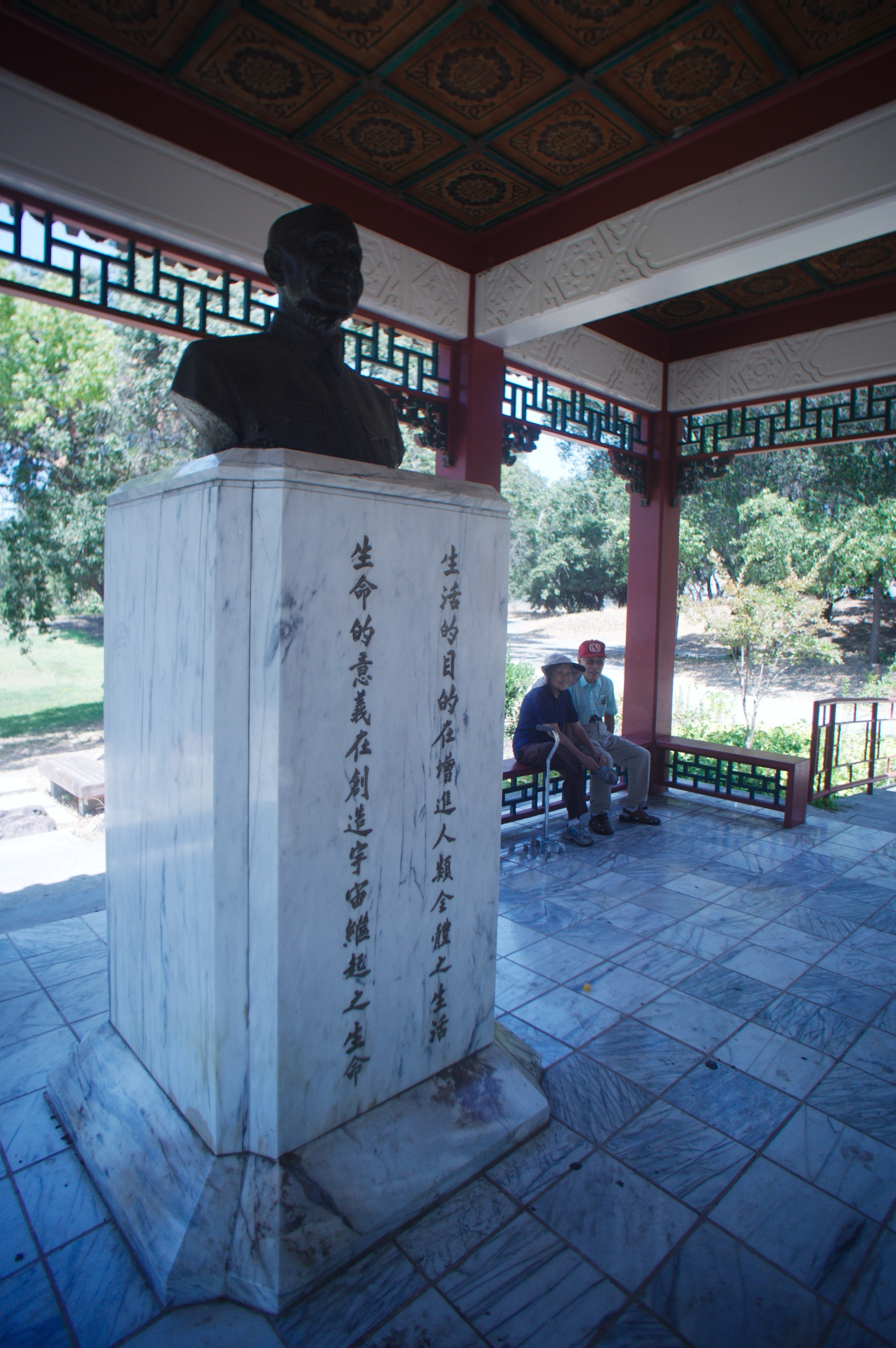
The Chiang Kai-shek pavilion features a bust of Chiang

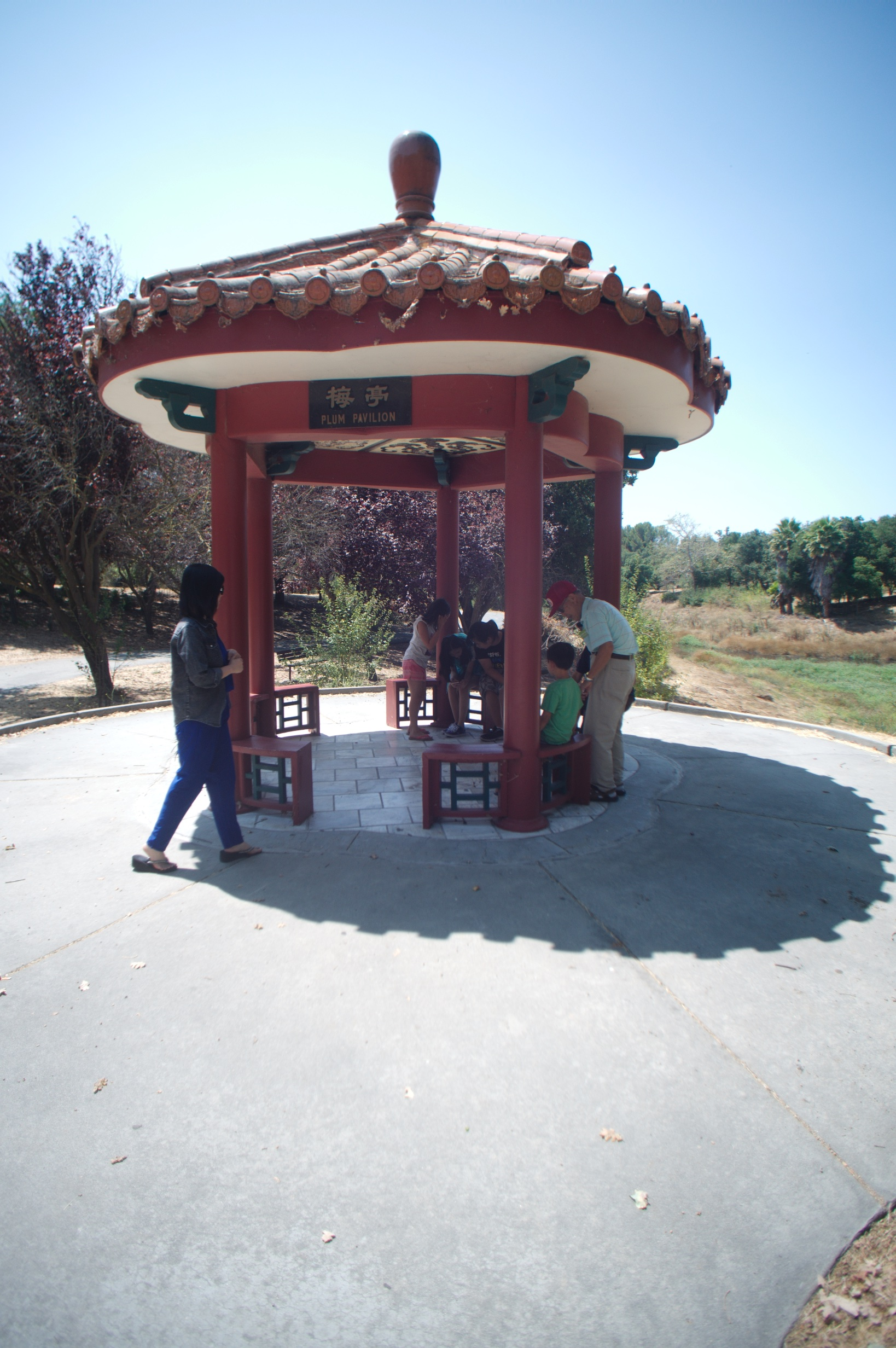
Circular Plum Pavilion

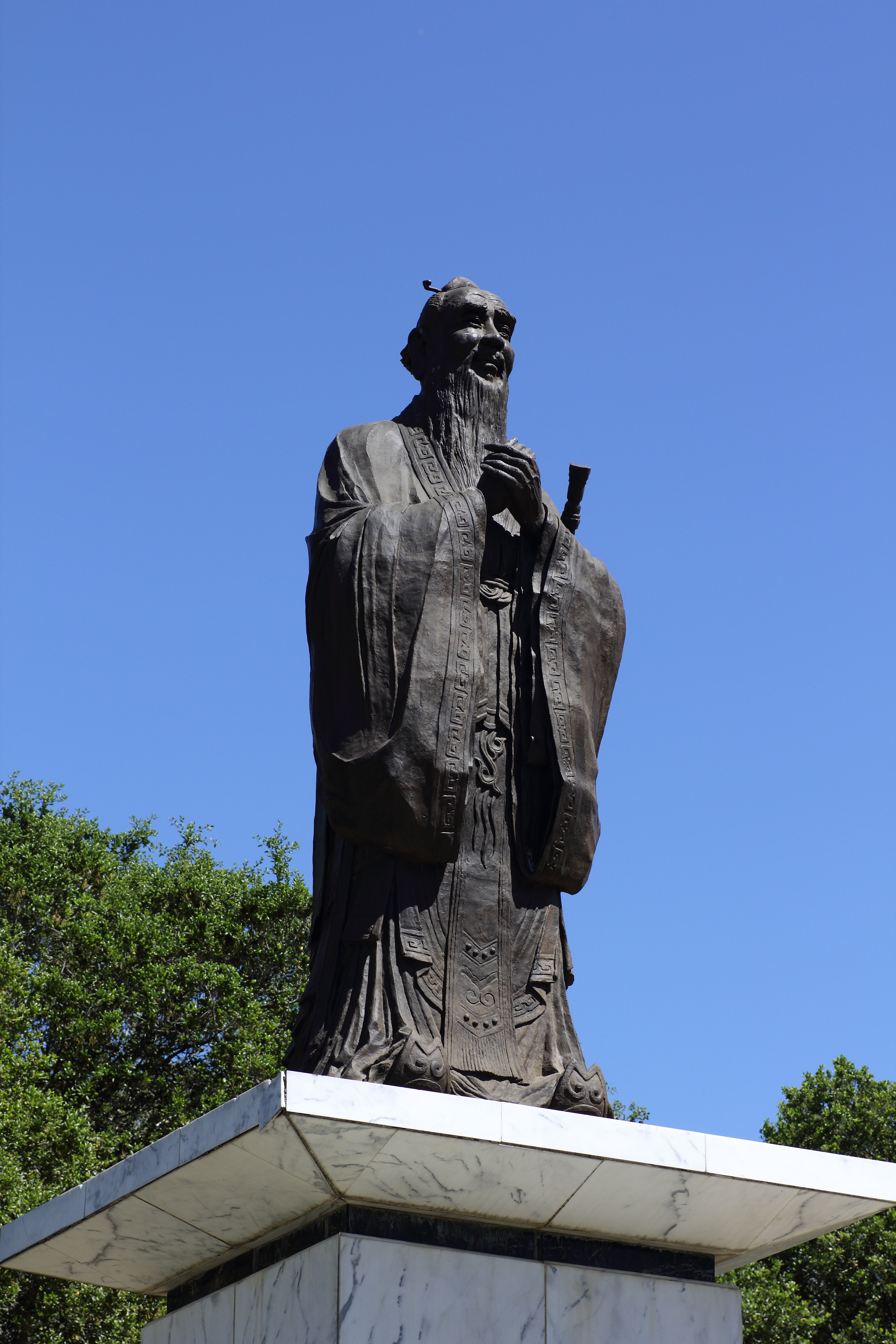
Statue of Confucius

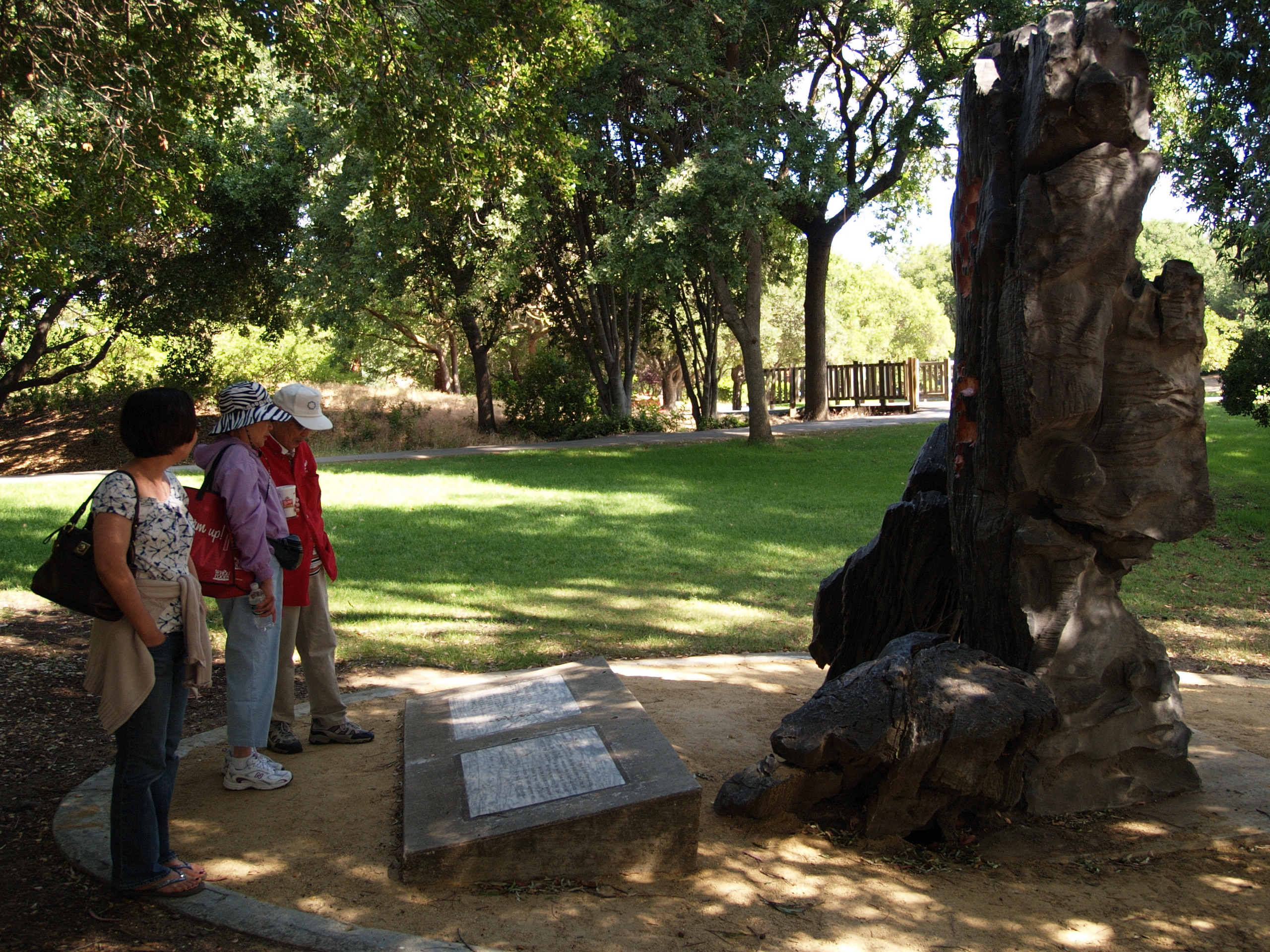
Million-year-old black stone gift from Tainan
