= Emma Prusch Farm Park =

Coordinates: 37°20′25″N 121°50′45″W

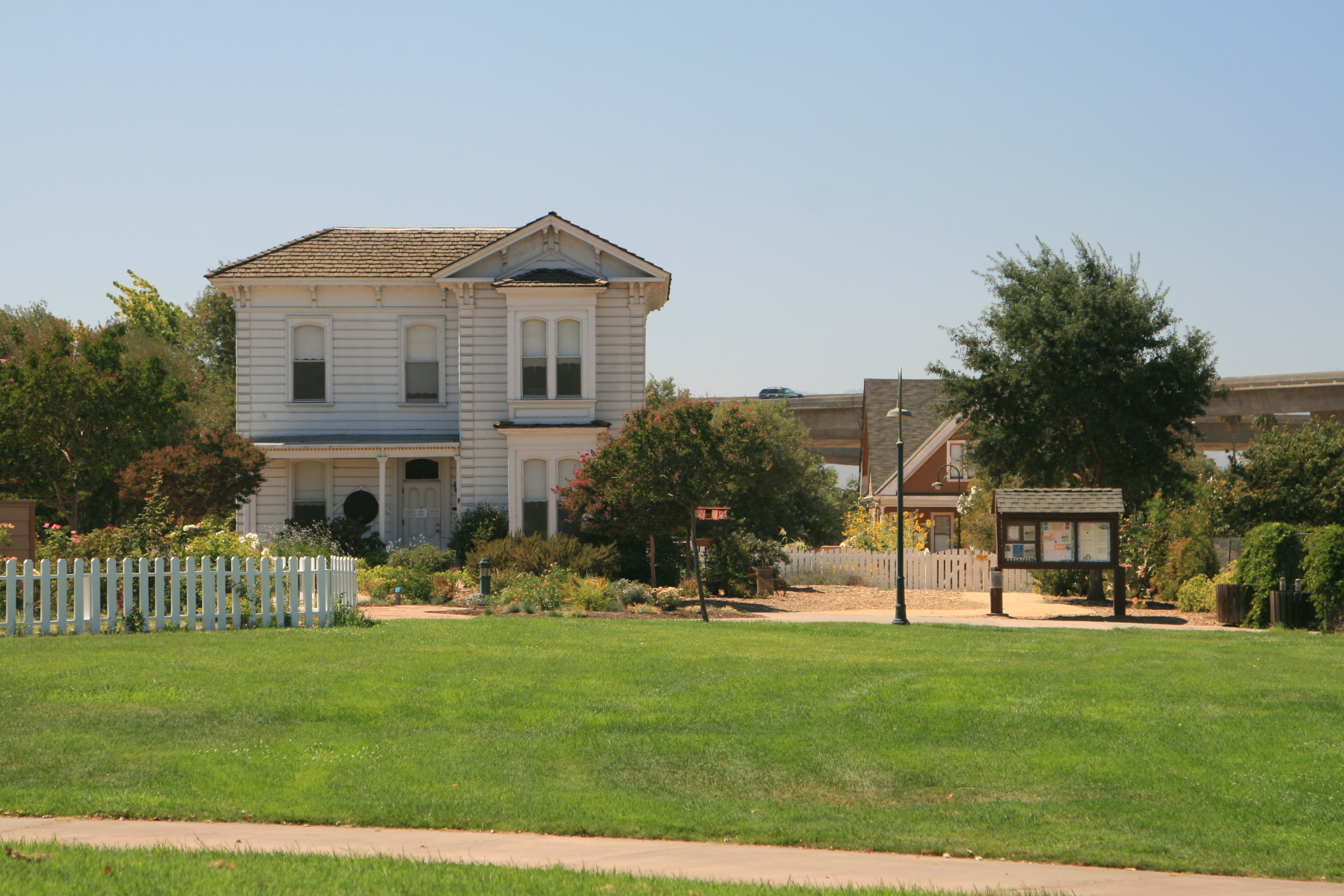
- Preserved farm house at the park
- Interactive map of Emma Prusch Farm Park
- Location: 647 S King Road, San Jose, CA 95116
- Governing body: Emma Prusch Farm Park Foundation, 501c3 City of San Jose Parks & Recreation Dept.
- Owner: City of San Jose

Emma Prusch Farm Park is a 43.5 acre (176,000 m^{2}) park in East San Jose, California. Donated by Emma Prusch to the City of San Jose in 1962 to use to demonstrate the valley's agricultural past, it includes a 4-H barn (the largest in San Jose), community gardens, a rare-fruit orchard, demonstration gardens, picnic areas, and expanses of lawn. The park is host to an annual Harvest Festival and is operated cooperatively by the San Jose Parks and Recreation Department and the non-profit Emma Prusch Farm Park Foundation.

== History ==
The land for this 42-acre (17 ha) farm park was donated by Emma Prusch to the City of San Jose in 1962 to keep for agricultural purposes, and provides an introduction to farm life. The park is operated as a small farm by the City of San Jose, Department of Parks, Recreation, and Neighborhood Services. Barn space is provided to city kids in the 4-H and Future Farmers of America so they can experience farming practices in an urban environment. The farm also has a rare fruit orchard, a deciduous fruit orchard and two community gardens, and a 6-acre (24,000 m^{2}) urban farming project called Veggielution. In the spring, the park offers guided tours for K–3 school groups. These tours provide a sensory education emphasis while students learn about gardens, fruit orchard, poultry and livestock.

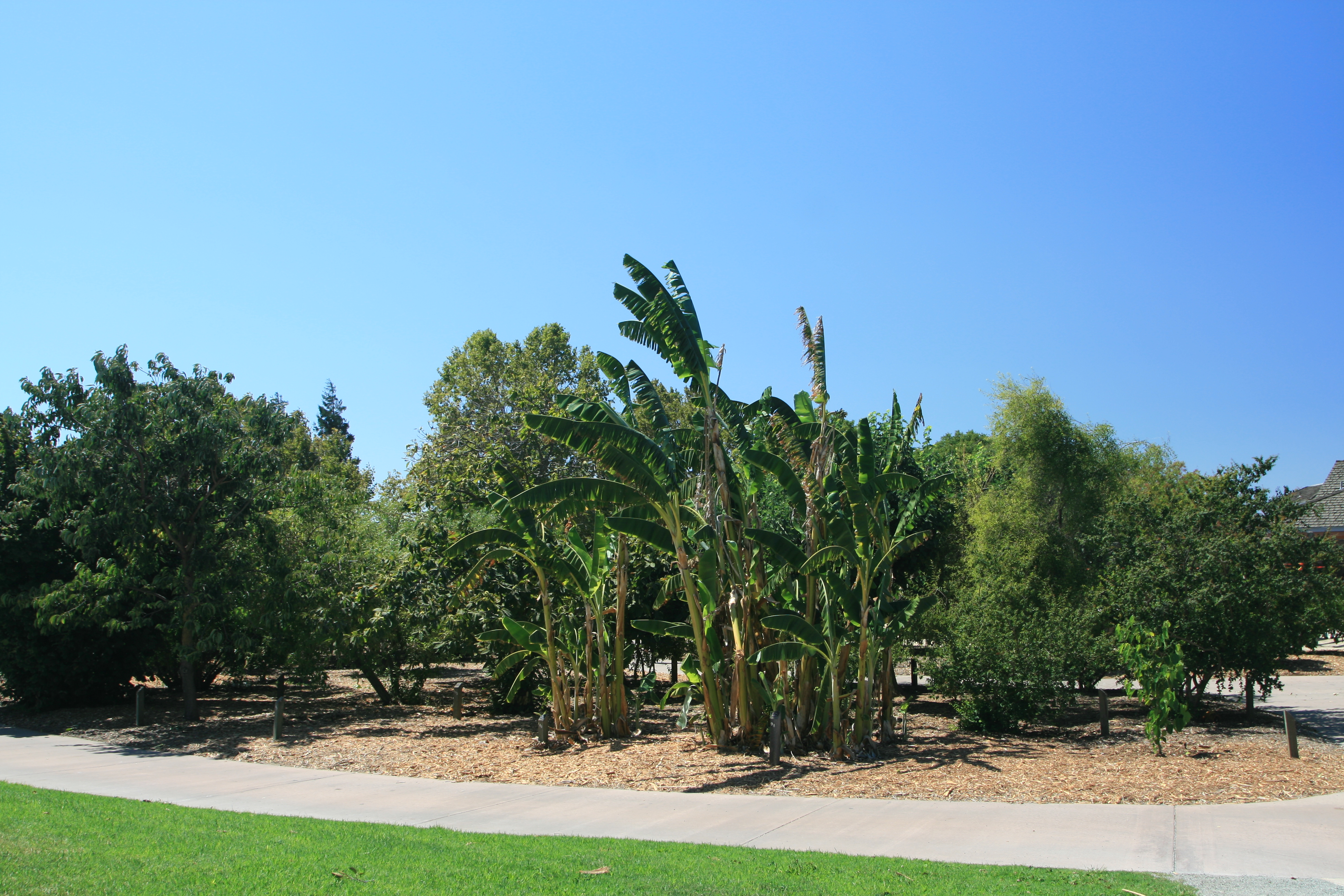
Rare Fruit Orchard

== Features ==
- Preserved Prusch farmhouse
- San Jose's largest free standing barn is run by City of San Jose staff. Livestock varies by season with kids in 4-H and the Future Farmers of America raising animals in the middle of the city.
- Small animal yard where children can see farm animals up close.
- California Rare Fruit Growers Orchard is a large cooperative project with the California Rare Fruit Growers Association, consisting of over 125 rare and exotic fruit trees including bananas, citrus, and other sub-tropicals. New signage will allow visitors to identify each tree while on a self-guided tour.
- Several acres of open grass perfect for picnicking, kite flying, games and relaxing
- 5 reservable group picnic areas, outdoor Wedding Barn, and a rental Meeting Hall community room with kitchen.
- Veggielution Community Farm; On a little over 6-acre (24,000 m^{2}) Veggielution empowers youth and adults from diverse backgrounds to create a sustainable food system in San Jose.

== Photo gallery ==
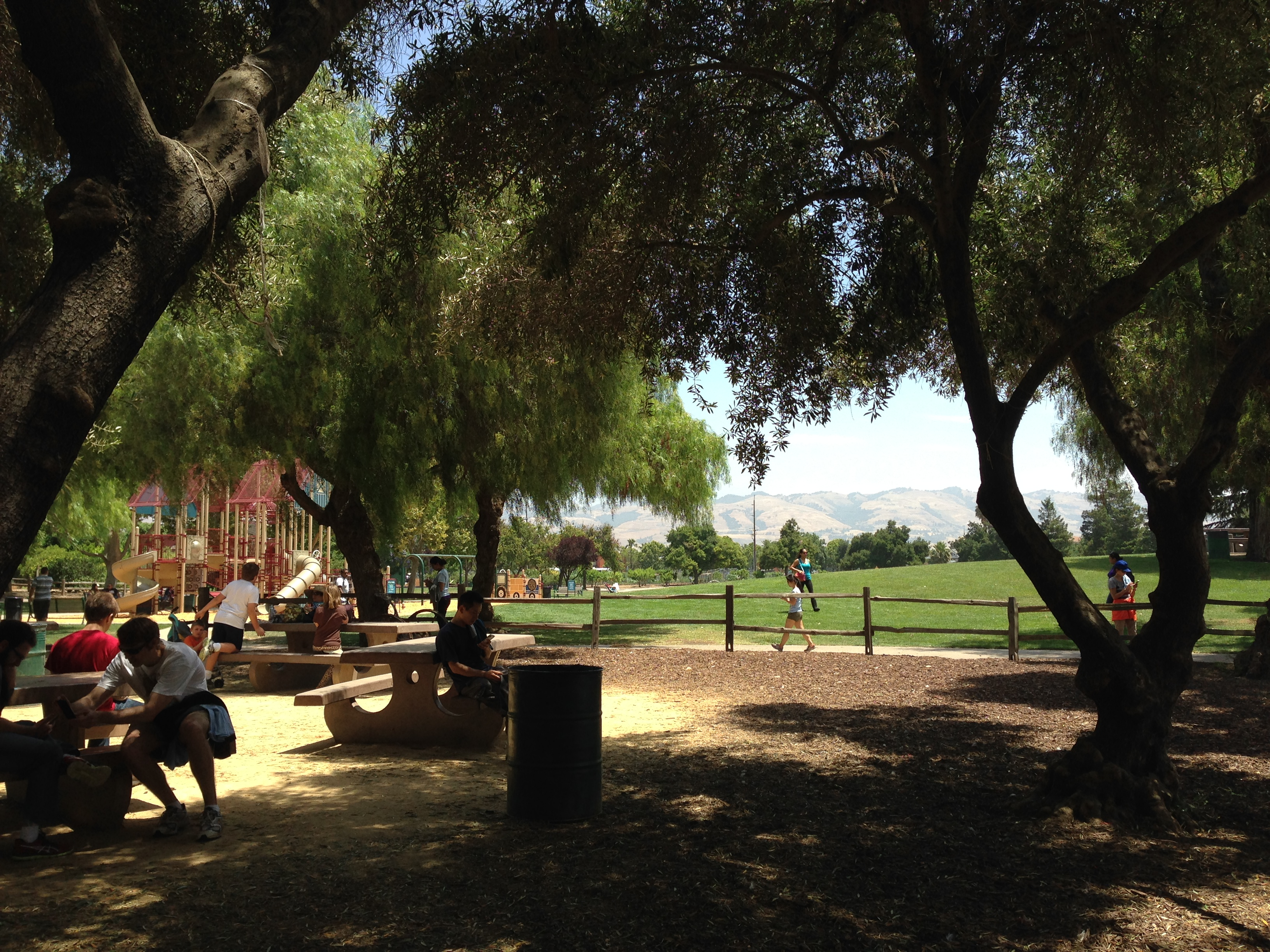
Playground and picnic area with view of mountains

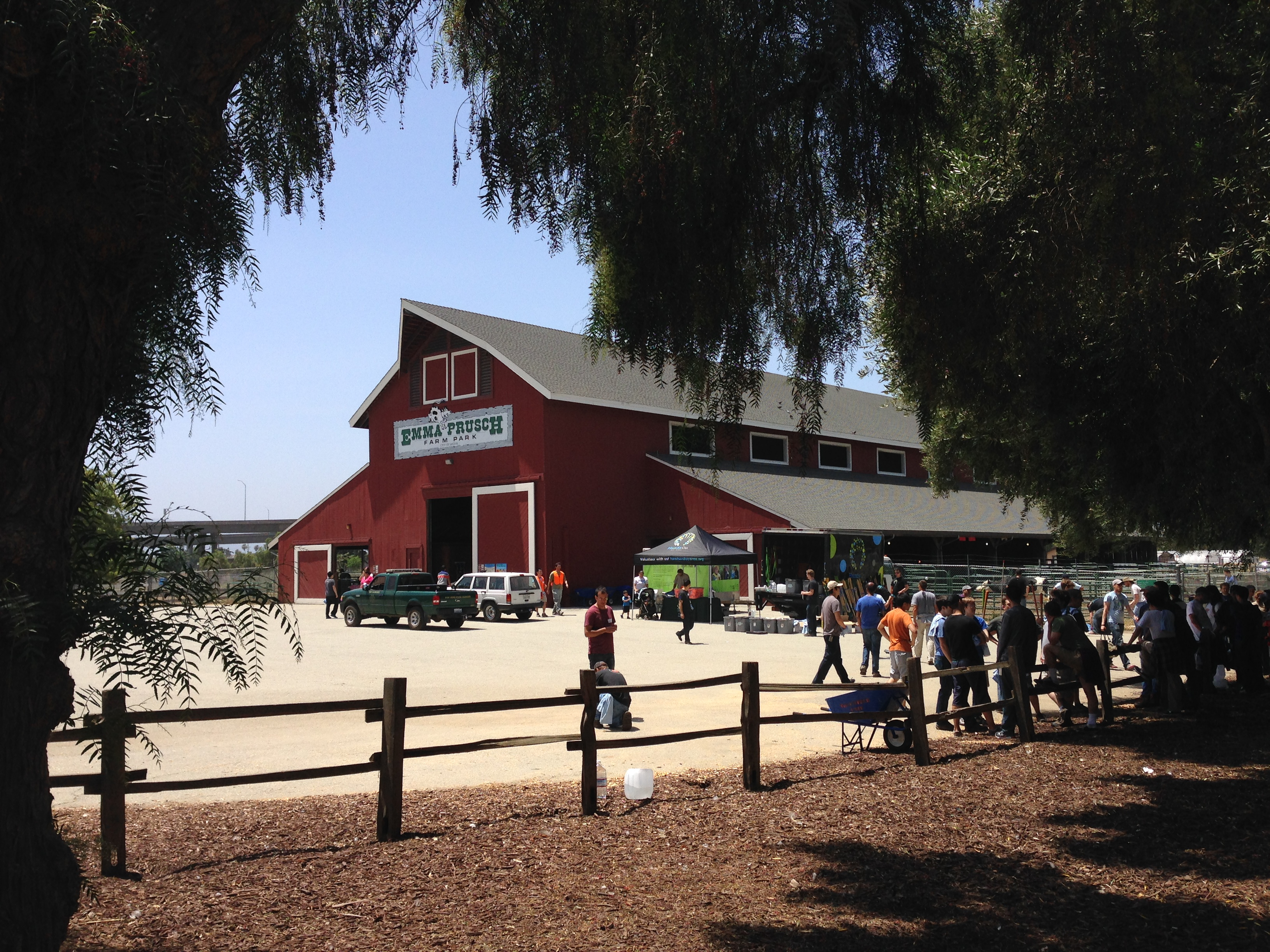
4-H barn exterior

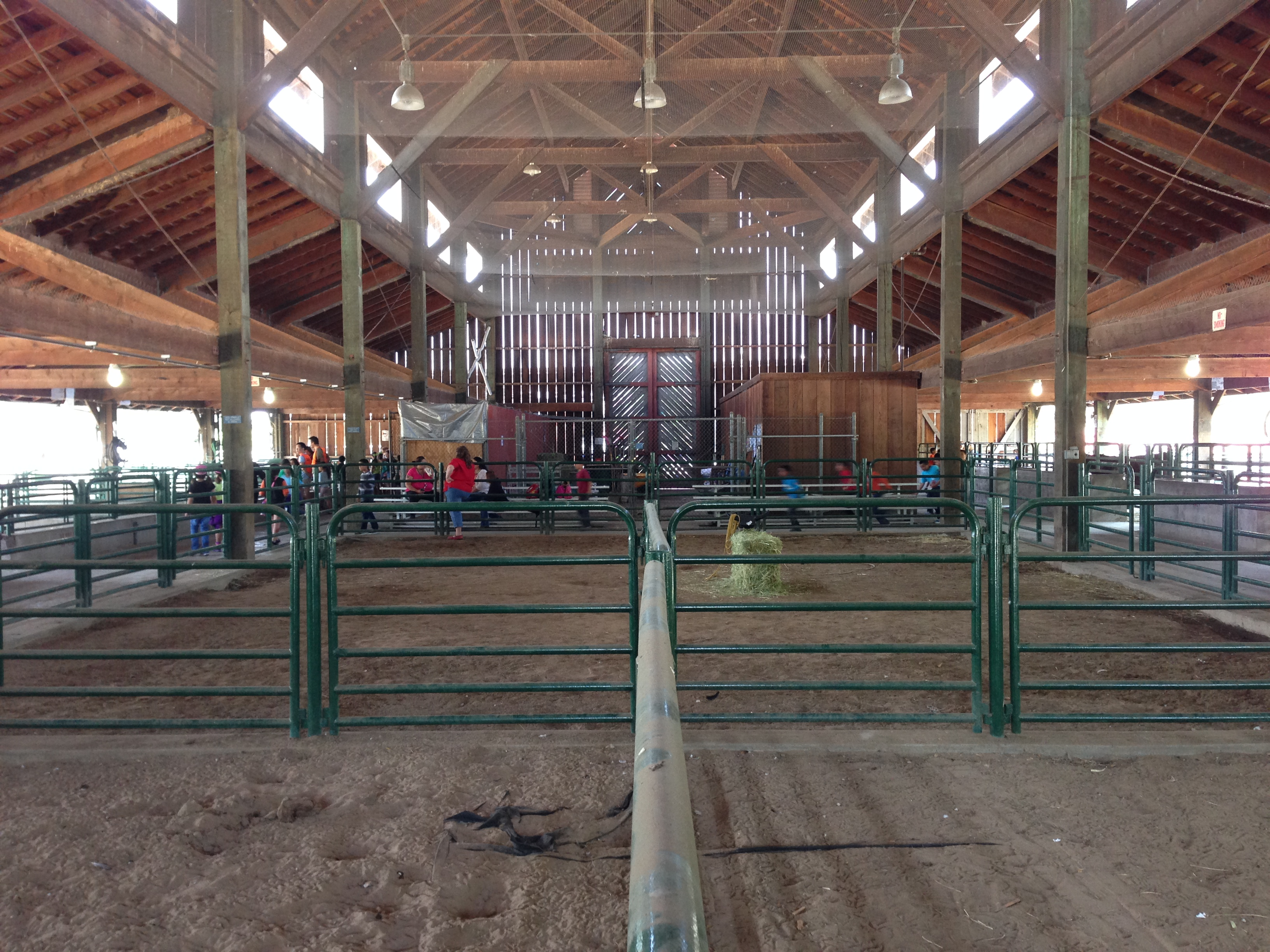
4-H barn interior

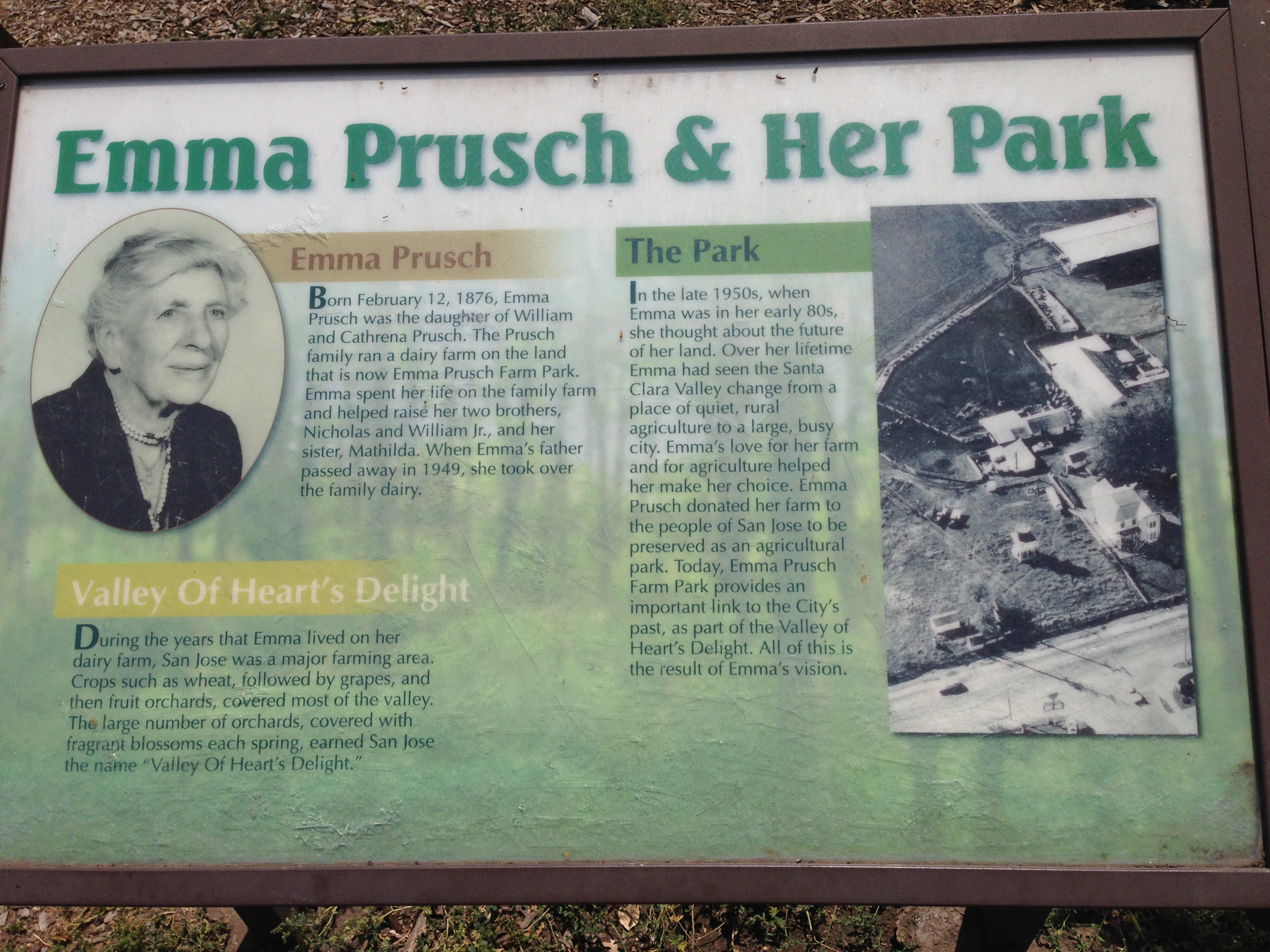
Information sign at Emma's home

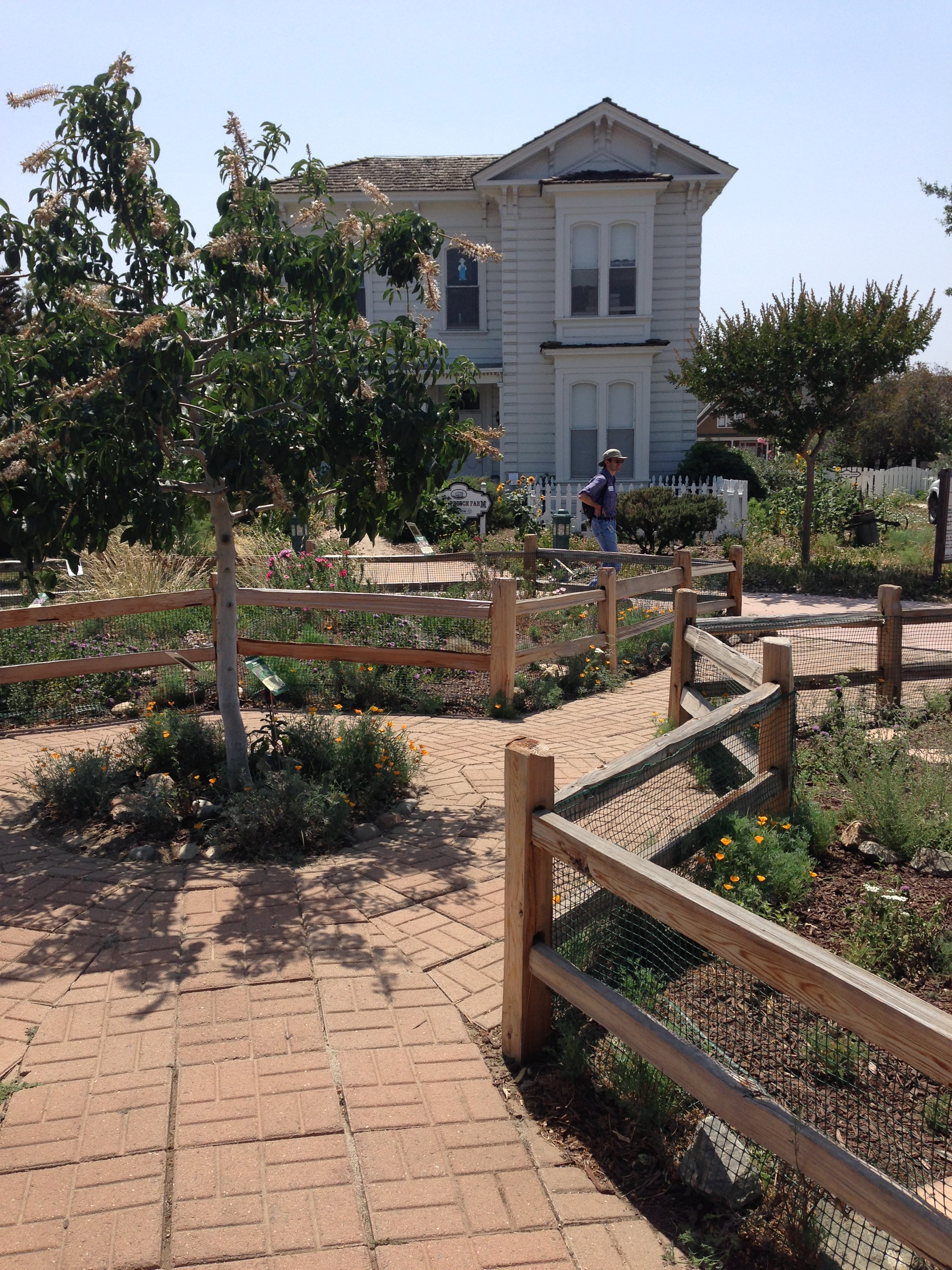
Gardens in front of Emma's home

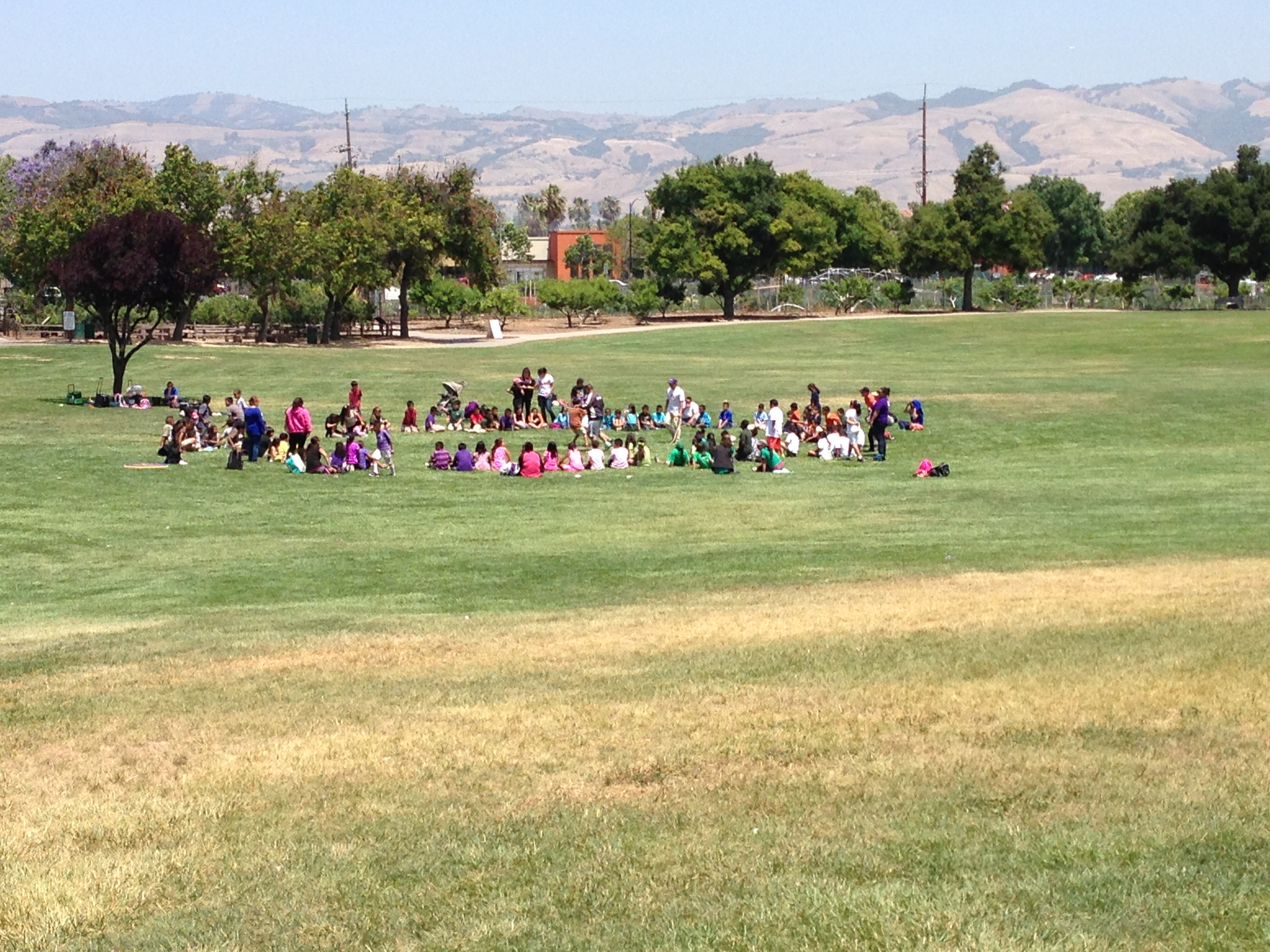
People on a park lawn with mountains in background
