= King & Story, San Jose =

King & Story
- Neighborhood of San Jose
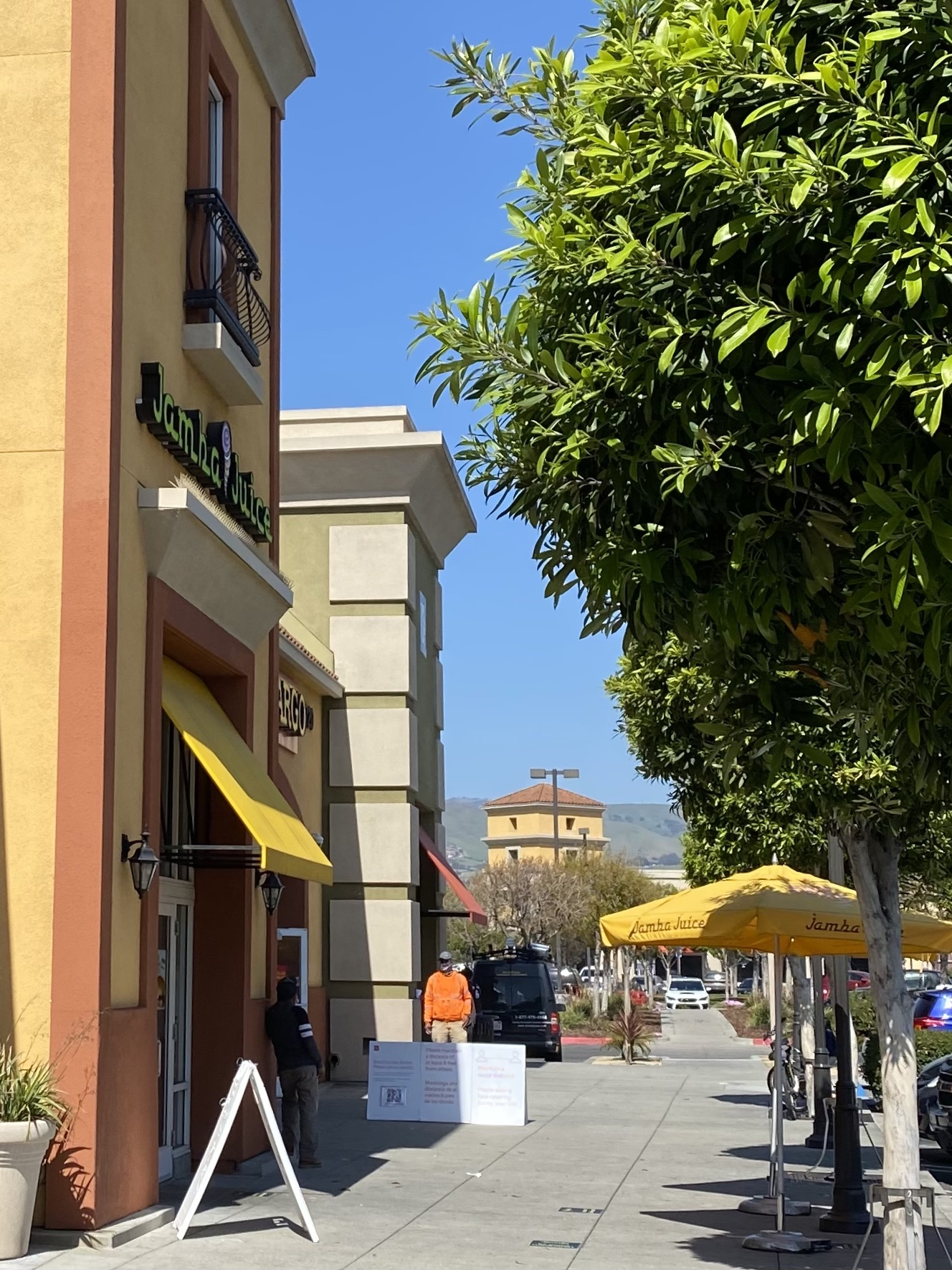
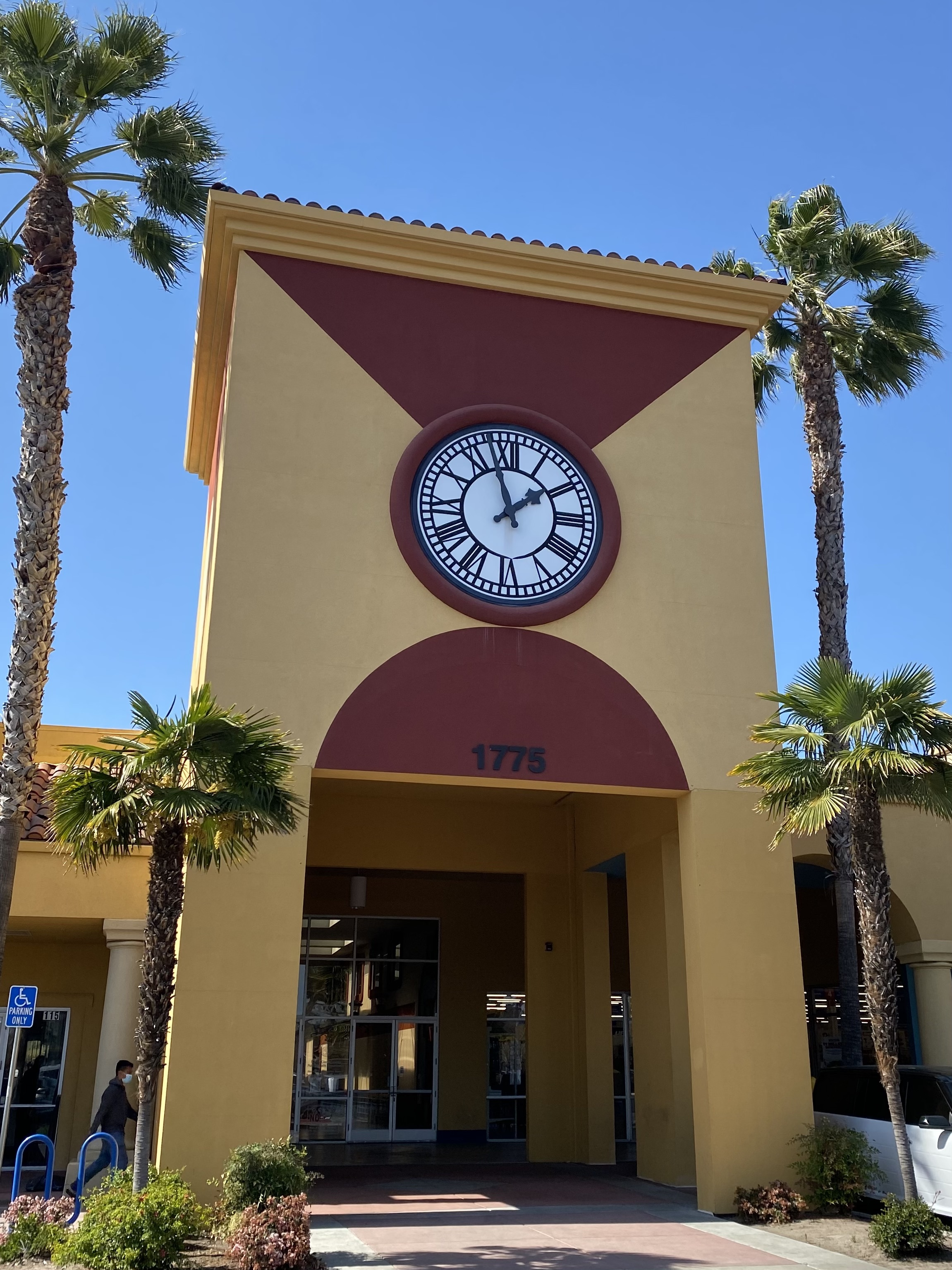
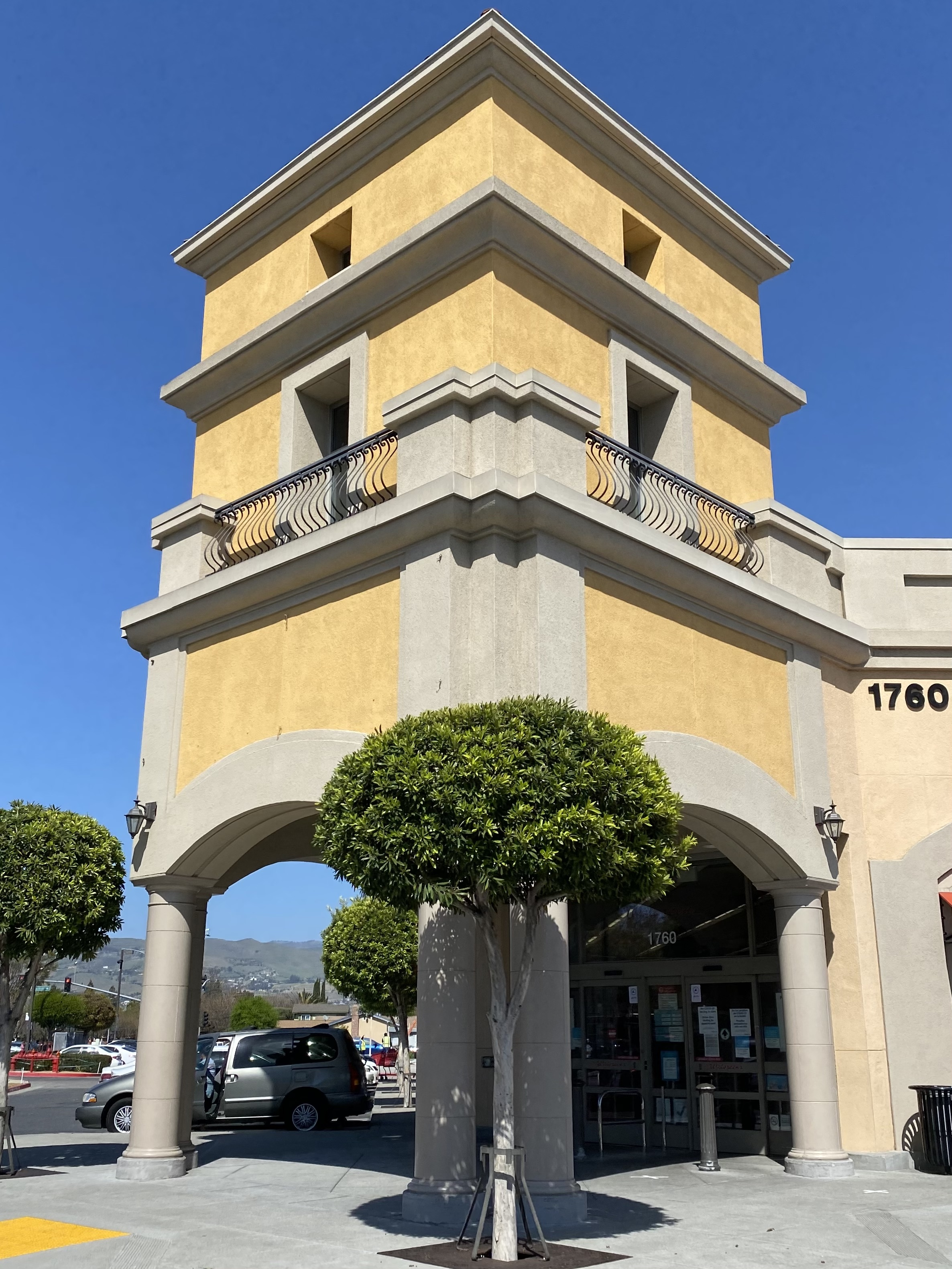
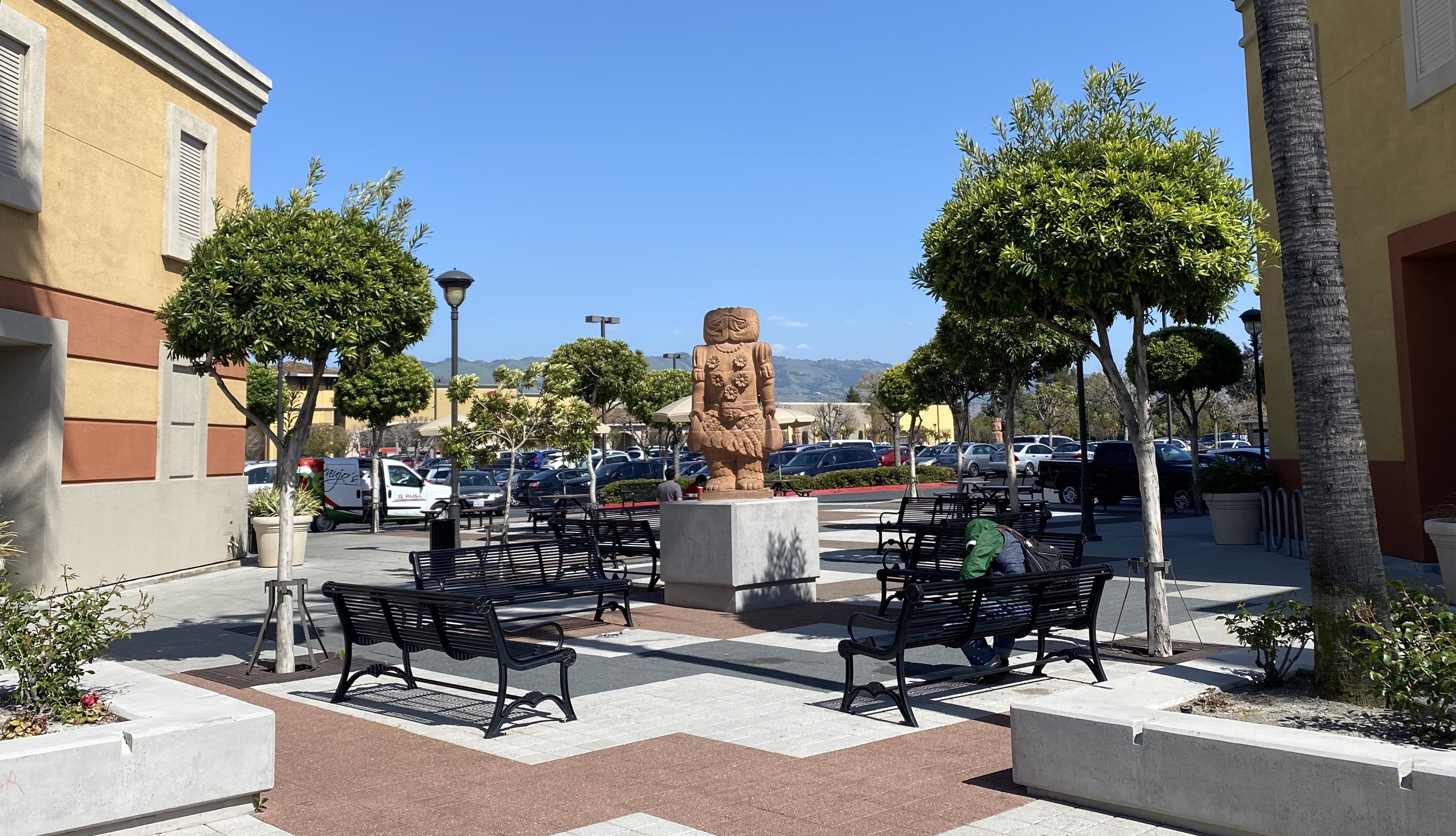
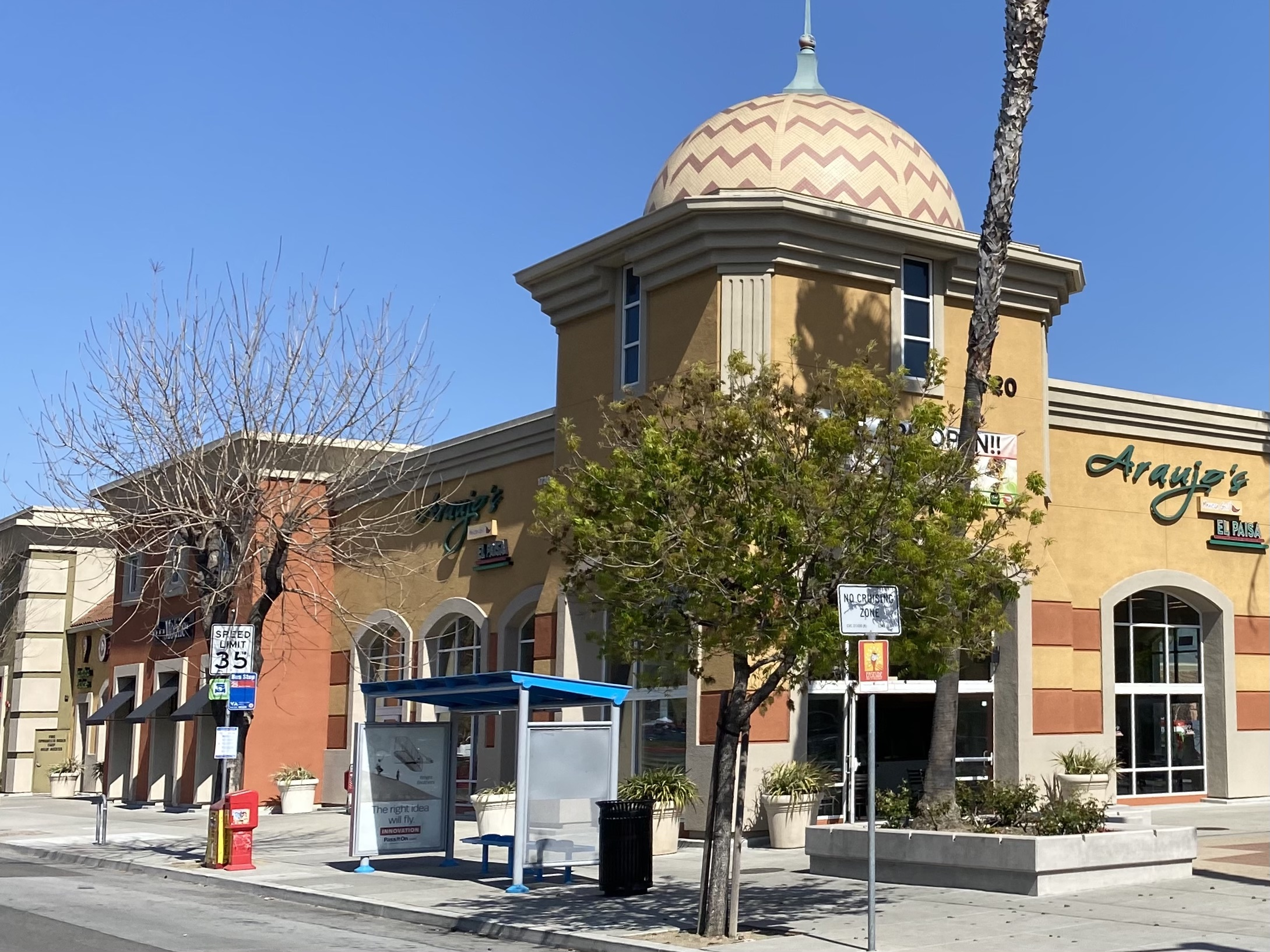
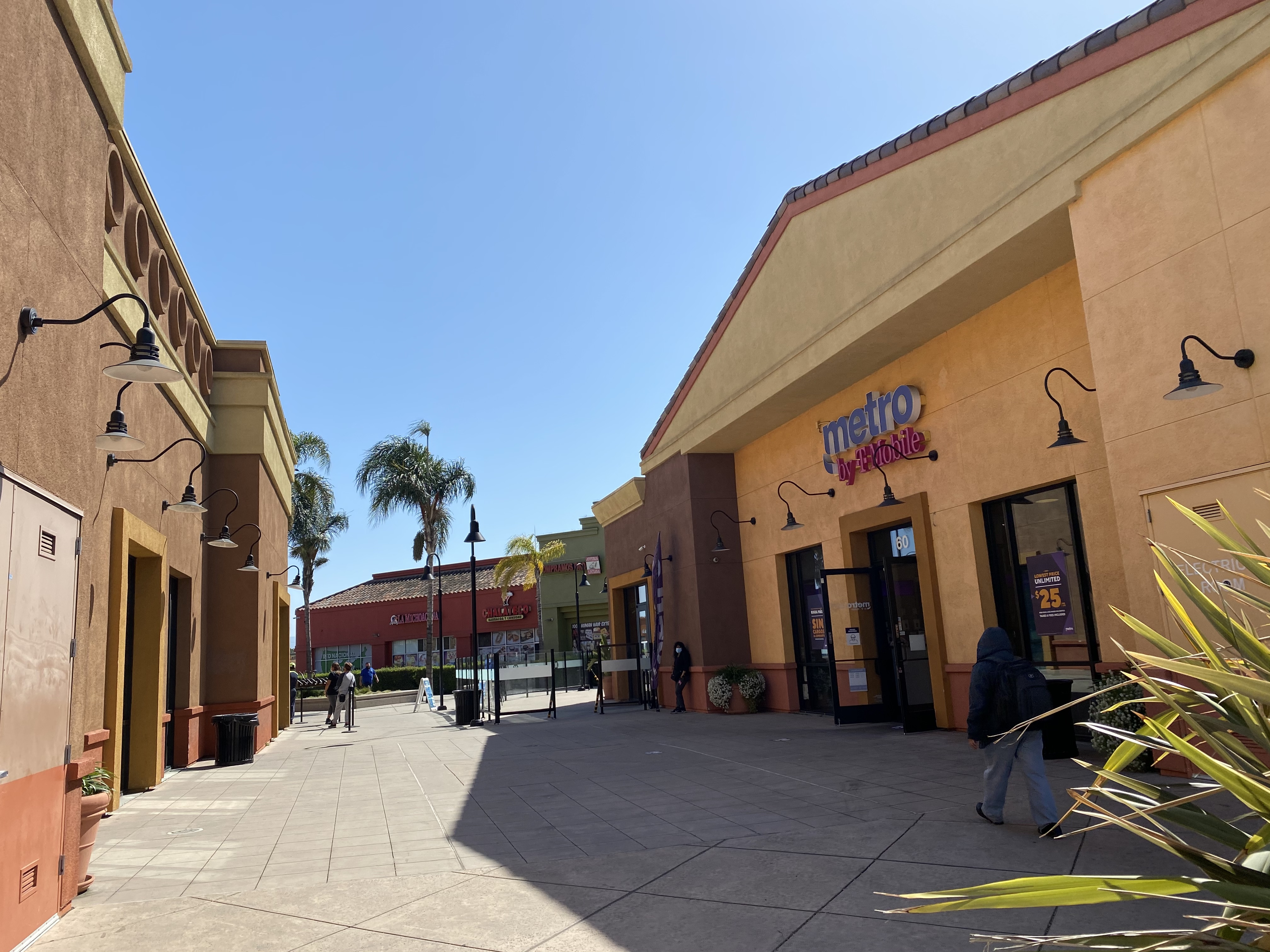
- Top: shops at Plaza de San José, Mi Pueblo Plaza clocktower, Plaza de San José; middle: Plaza de Coatlique; bottom: intersection of King & Story, shops at La Placita Tropicana.

- Location within San Jose, California
- Coordinates: 37.339814°N 121.844313°W
- Country: United States
- State: California
- County: Santa Clara
- City: San Jose
- Area code: Area code 408

The King & Story, also known as Story & King, neighborhood of San Jose, California is located in the Alum Rock district of East San Jose, centered on the intersection of King and Story roads. King & Story is one of San Jose's most notable and historic Chicano/Mexican-American neighborhoods.

== History ==
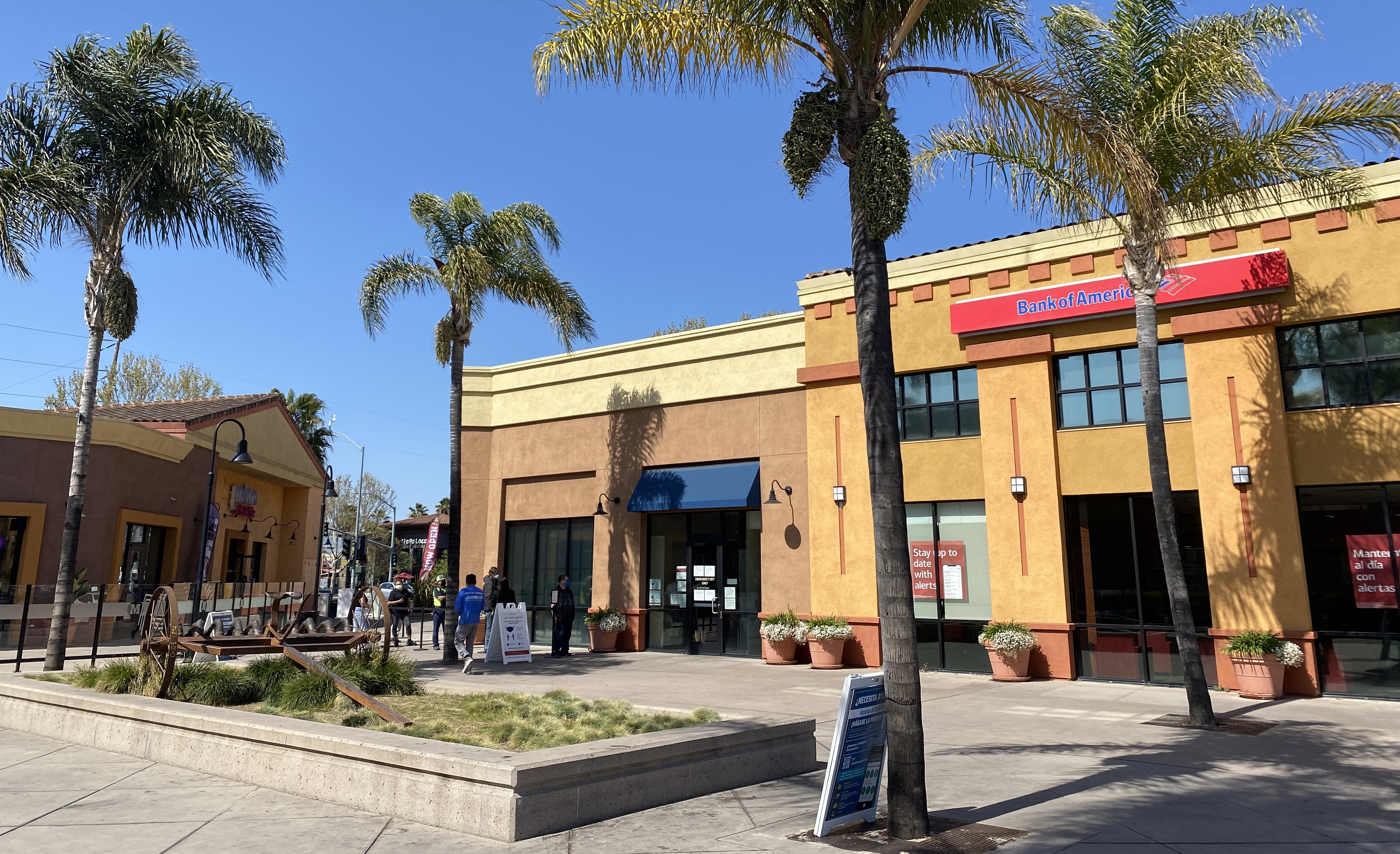
Shops at La Placita Tropicana.

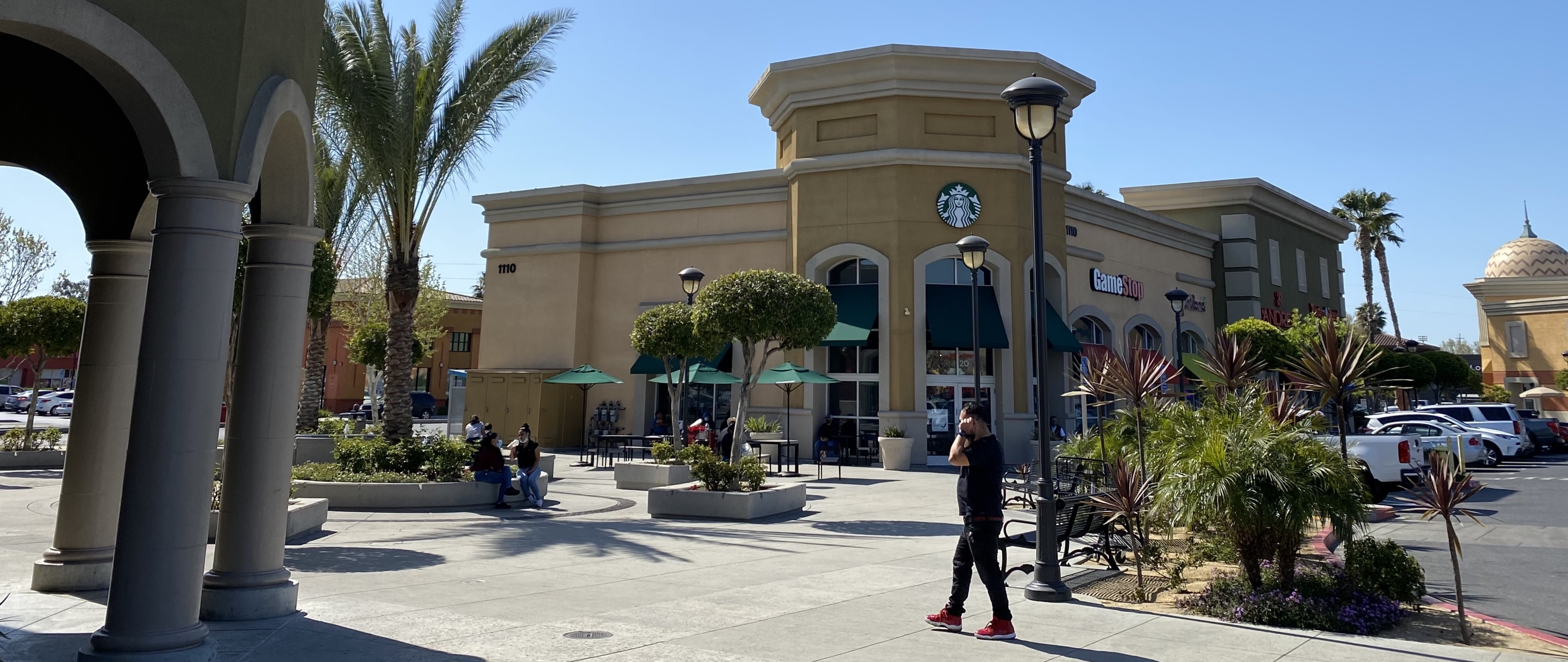
Stores at Plaza de San José.

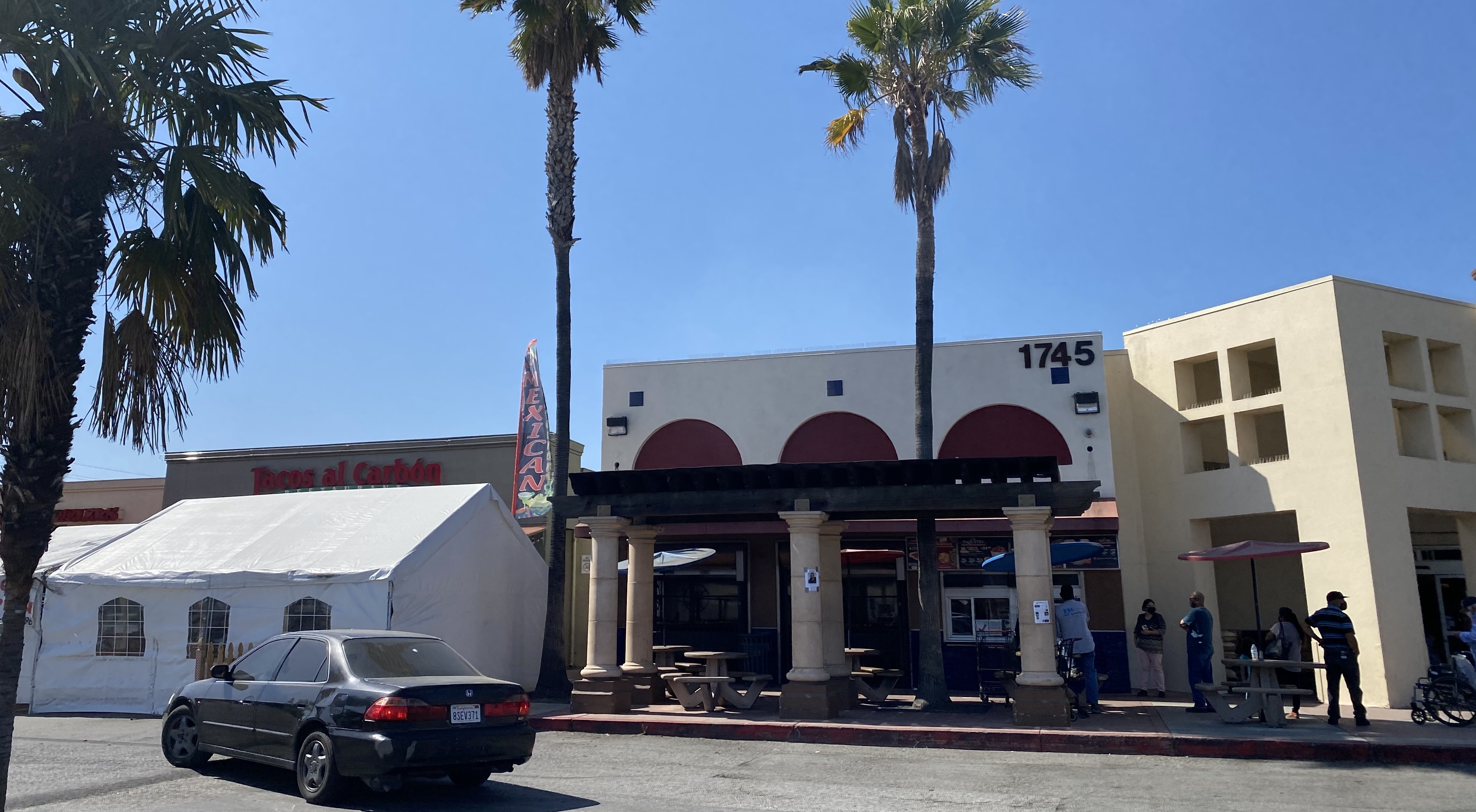
Restaurants at Mi Pueblo Plaza.

The area surrounding King and Story, zip code 95122, is a hub for the East San Jose Community and for Latino culture in San Jose. The neighborhood is sometimes known as Tropicana, after the shopping center on the southwest corner of the intersection. In the 1930s, future agricultural labor union leader César Chávez and his family moved into the neighborhood. It was here that Chávez first began his political actions, registering voters and organizing English language classes for the mostly Mexican American residents. The first grocery stores targeted by the NFWA grape boycott were on King Road. In the 1980s the area was a hub of lowrider culture, and the Mural de la Raza, which depicts Chicano history and was created on a wall near the intersection in that decade, is now one of the oldest murals in the city. The Mi Pueblo Hispanic supermarket chain started at the intersection.

At the start of the 21st century, the San Jose Redevelopment Agency pursued redevelopment of the intersection, successfully locating a grocery store on the north-east corner before pursuing eminent domain to redevelop the southeast and southwest corners. On the southeast corner, in conjunction with local developers Blake-Hunt Ventures, vacant and abandoned buildings were replaced with needed banking and shopping options. However, after encountering a court challenge to its acquisition of the Tropicana shopping center on the southwest corner, the city paid $6.8 million in 2002 to the primary landowner who contended that his own redevelopment plans had been unfairly interfered with, and settled for acquisition of certain portions and the redevelopment of the remainder in conjunction with the existing owners.

In 2003, the San Jose City Council considered a bill to rename King Road, named for an 1851 settler to San Jose, after Martin Luther King Jr. The proposal was generally supported by the African American community and opposed by the Hispanic population. The city council eventually rejected the proposal.

In the late 2000s the neighborhood was badly impacted by the subprime mortgage crisis.

== Culture ==
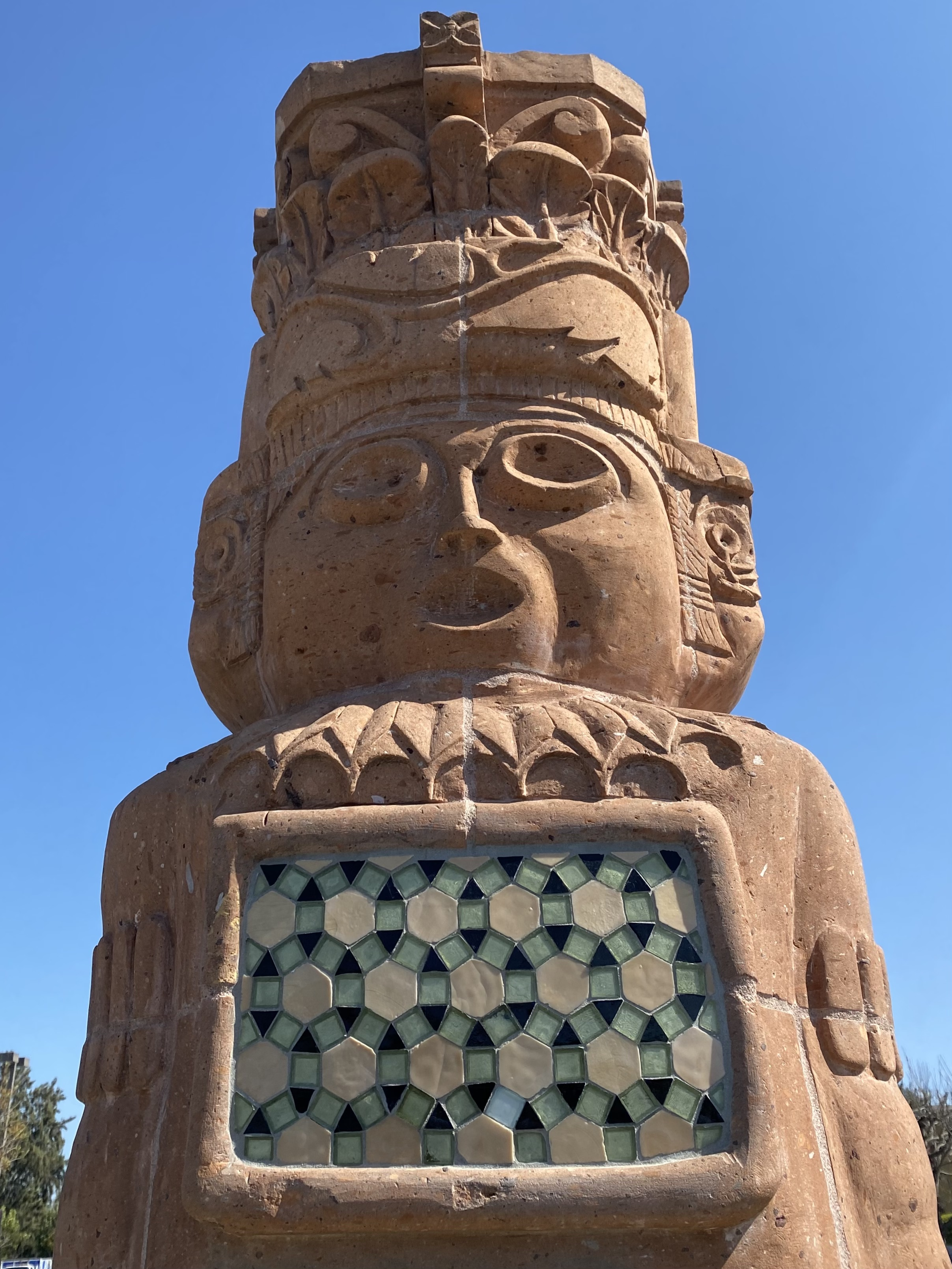
The Tula Sentries.

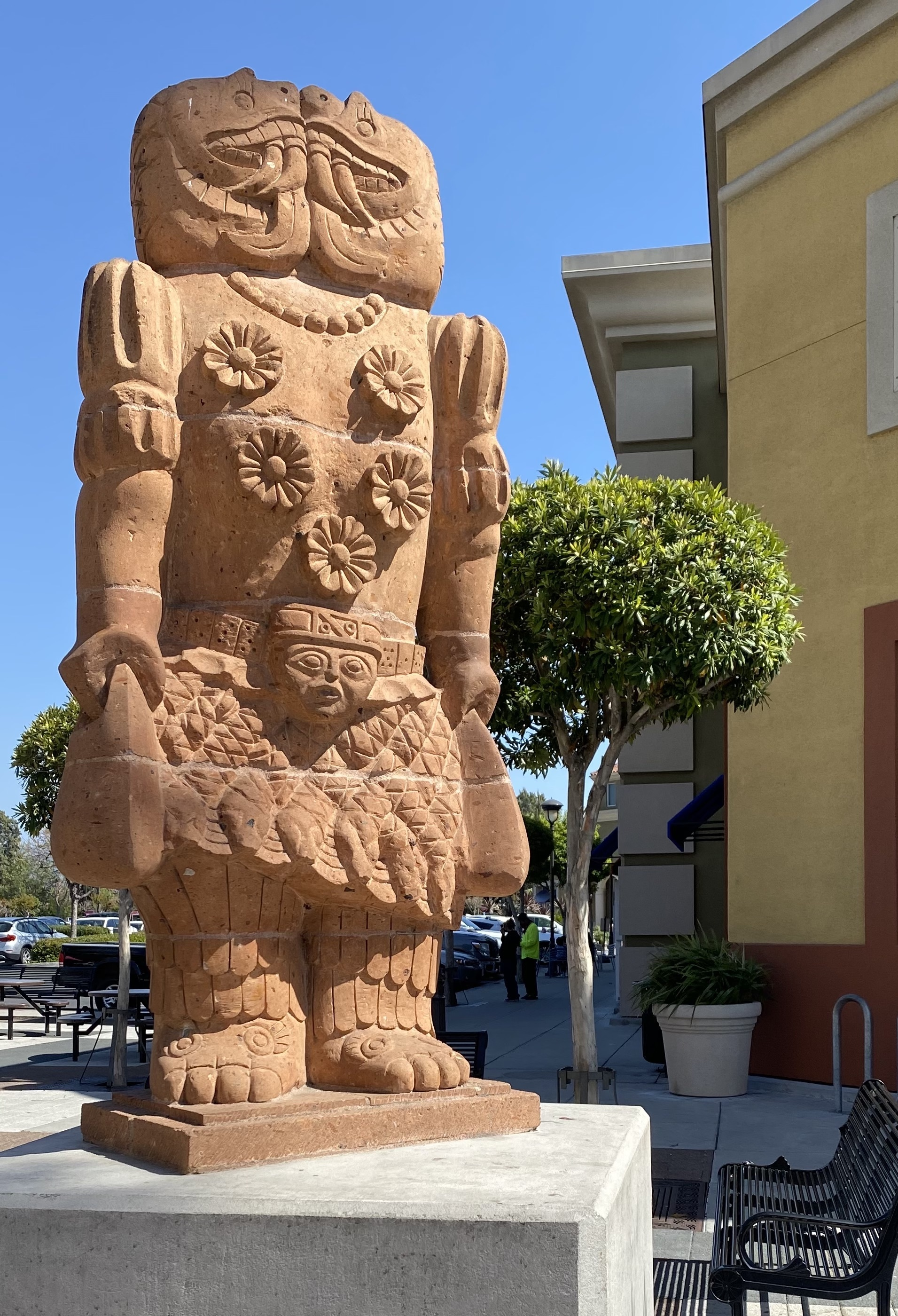
Statue of Coatlique, Aztec Mother of Gods.

King & Story is one of the most historic centers of the Chicano/Mexican-American community in San Jose.

=== Lowriding ===
King and Story is also recognized as being the "Whittier Boulevard of the North" which has many similar characteristics as East Los Angeles. The usage and showings of lowriders is prevalent along King Rd and Story Rd.

While lowriding began in Los Angeles during the 1940s, by the 1960s lowriding had become commonplace in East San Jose's Chicano/Mexican-American community, particularly along the broad boulevards of Alum Rock Avenue and Story Road. Lowrider magazine was founded in San Jose in 1977 by San Jose State students Larry González, Sonny Madrid, and David Núñez. The magazine covered not only the cars, but the culture surrounding lowriders.

Today, lowrider culture permeates mainstream society through art, music and cars. Several South Bay car clubs still exist and participate in events like Cinco de Mayo celebrations and "Show-n-Shine" events.

== Parks and plazas ==
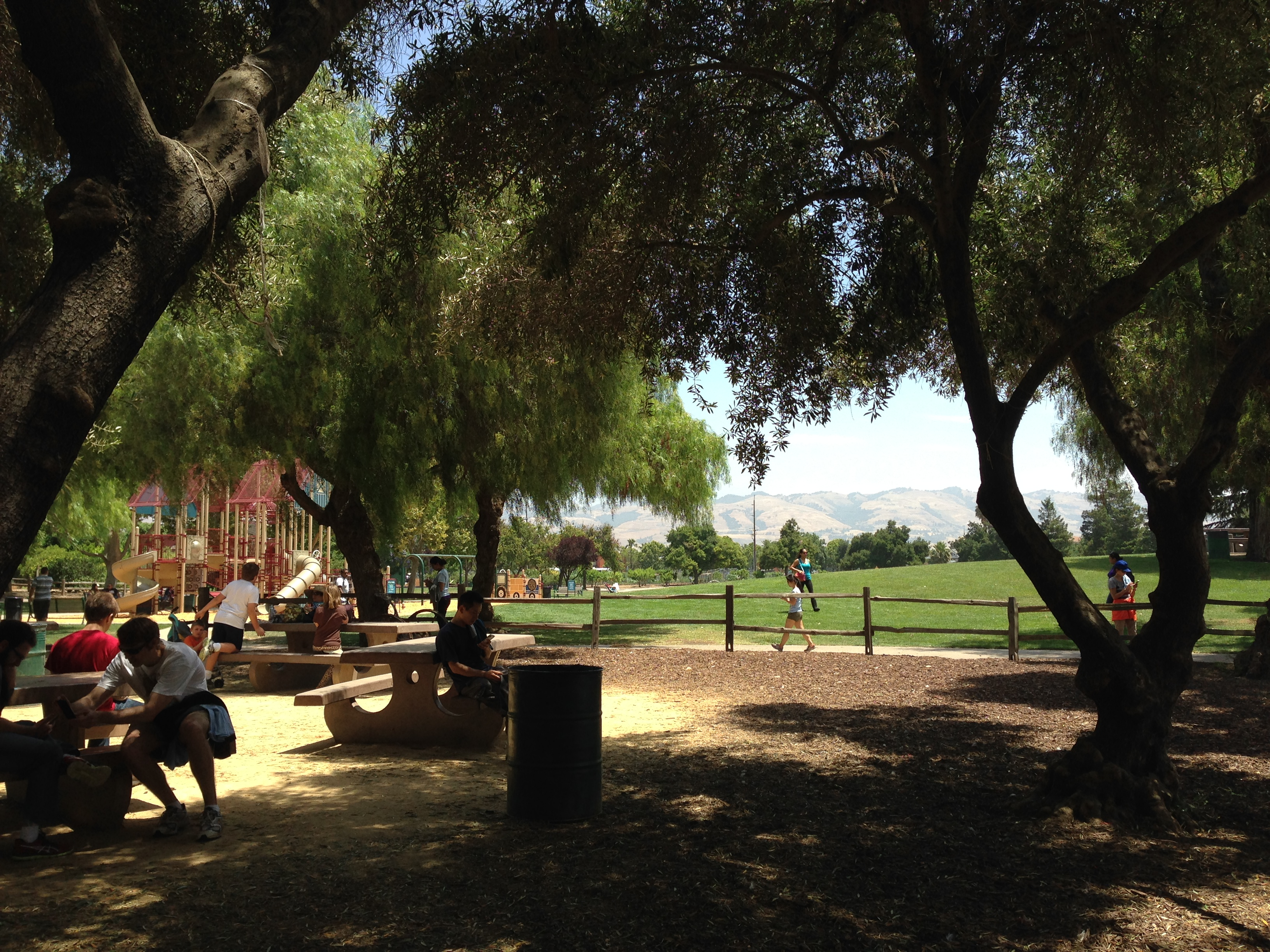
Emma Prusch Farm Park.

- Emma Prusch Farm Park
  - El Jardín Community Garden
  - Cornucopia Community Garden
  - Veggielution Community Farm
- Plaza de Coatlique
