= Paul Thomson (botanist) =

- Born: Paul H. Thomson; June 29, 1916; India
- Died: May 31, 2008 (aged 91); Fallbrook, California, U.S.
- Scientific career
- Author abbrev. (botany): P.H.Thomson

Paul Thomson (June 29, 1916 – May 31, 2008) was an American exotic fruit enthusiast, self-taught horticulturist and botanist, fruit farmer, and the co-founder of the California Rare Fruit Growers Association, a group of amateur horticulturists which now has more than 3,000 members in approximately 35 countries. Thomson is credited with helping to expand the farming of exotic fruits in California – everything from cherimoyas to longans to pitahayas. Thomson also wrote one of the few literary treatments of the genus Dudleya, and was an avid collector of the plants.

== Life ==
=== Early life ===
Paul Thomson was born on June 29, 1916, in India to parents, Clinton and Bertha Mangon Thomson. His mother was a doctor who ran a local Indian hospital while his father was a minister. Tragedy struck the family when Thomson was hunting with his father when he was 11 years old. His father had shot two ducks for the family's Christmas dinner, but drowned while trying to retrieve them from a lake.

Thomson, his mother and his four younger sisters returned to the United States following his father's death. The family settled in his parents' native Nebraska, where his mother set up a medical practice. Thomson raised chickens, churned butter and grew potatoes during the Great Depression to earn money for his family. Thomson graduated from high school in 1934 and enrolled in Nebraska Wesleyan University for two years, but dropped out in 1937 due to unaffordable tuition costs. Following his departure from NWU, he briefly worked as an installer of telegraph lines for Western Union and early railroad-signal control systems in Colorado. He also worked as a wheat and turkey farmer for a short period of time.

Thomson enlisted in the United States Marines in 1938, a year after dropping out of college. He served as a chemical warfare instructor during World War II. He later ran a U.S. military sawmill to produce lumber for military operations in Korea during the Korean War. Another of his assignments in Korea was to monitor horticultural operations, which would lead to a lifelong interest in plants. The Marines stationed him at the Marine Corps Recruit Depot in San Diego during the 1950s, which brought Thomson to Southern California. One of his duties in San Diego was working in the base's nursery.

=== Death ===
Paul Thomson died on May 31, 2008, at the age of 91, of complications related to old age, at a retirement home in Fallbrook, California. He was survived by his four younger sisters, Margaret Greiber, Catharine Kingsolver, Alice Hasenyager, and Ellen Hanly. His wife, Helen, died in 2007. They had been married for 65 years.

== Career ==
=== Rare fruits ===
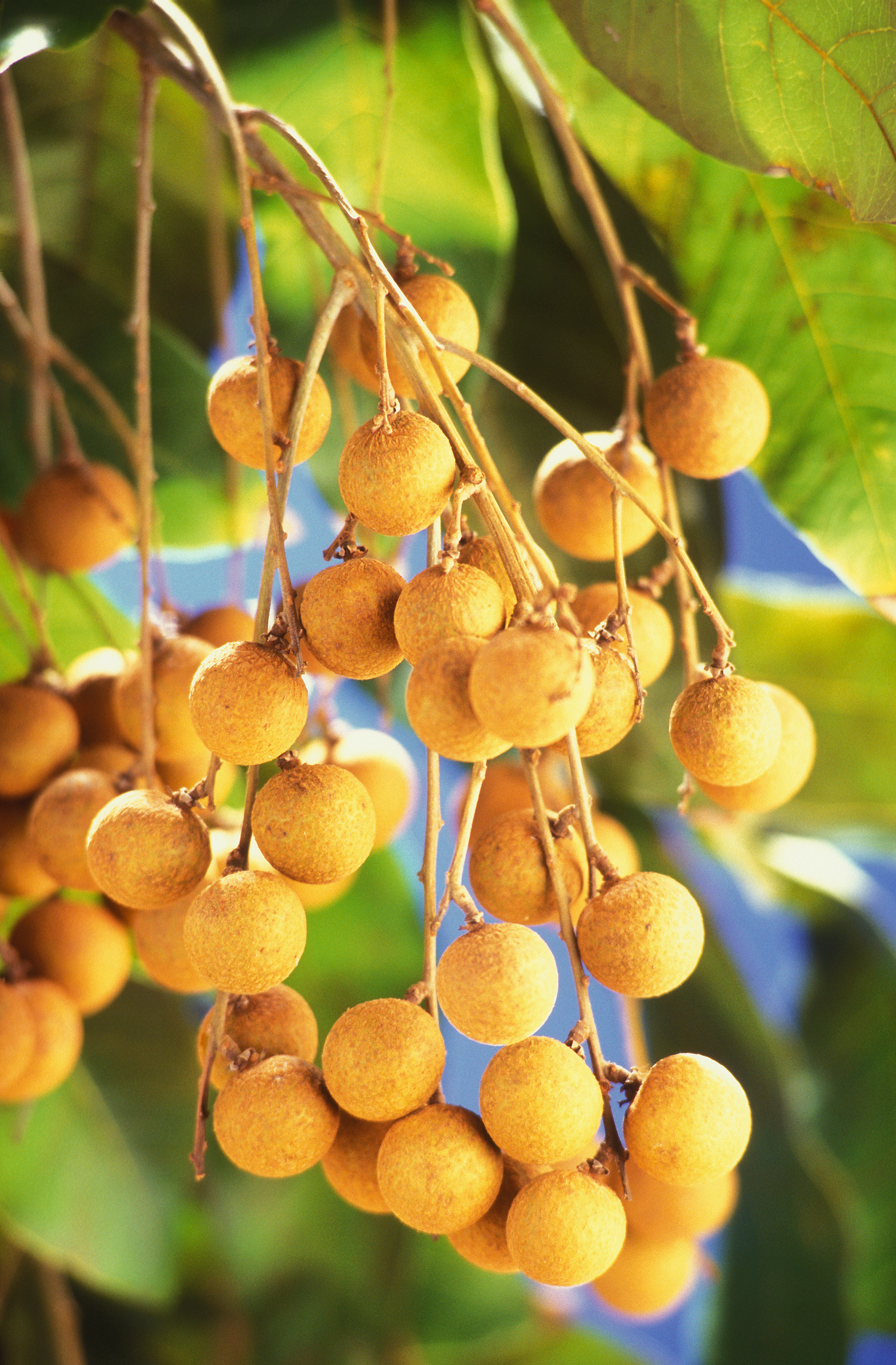
Thomson operated the only longan orchard in the United States at the time.

Thomson began experimenting with rare fruits during the early 1950s after being stationed in San Diego. He and his wife, Helen, purchased five acres (2 ha) of land in Bonsall, California, in 1952. The couple initially lived in a trailer on the land while they were building their home. He began experimenting with tropical fruits and fruit trees that were usually found in climates warmer than that part of Southern California. Thomson initially planted papayas, lychees, mangoes, longans and other tropical species on his new 5-acre (20,000 m^{2}) farm. However, most of his attempts to grow these fruits were a failure due to freezing temperatures during the winters. For example, mangoes could not survive the winter climate in Bonsall.

Thomson decided to make another attempt at growing tropical fruits with a second farm in a different location. In 1962, Thomson purchased another small farm in Vista, California, and called it Edgehill. His newest farm and orchard was only five miles (8 km) from his other property in Bonsall, but it had a much milder climate, especially during the winter. This made Edgehill more conducive to growing tropical, exotic fuits that had not been previously grown in California. He was able to finally grow successful harvests of mangoes, cherimoyas, lychees and other fruits.

The Los Angeles Times reported in 1971 that Thomson was able to grow 96 separate types of fruit between his two orchards in Bonsall and Edgehill. Most of these fruits had not been widely grown in the United States before Thomson planted them on his properties. Thomson grew the first successful Mammee apple crop, also known as the South American apricot or the mamey, of note in California. He also ran the only longan orchard in the United States at the time. A friend of Thomson, Jim Neitzel, said that his Edgehill farm soon attracted the attention of other botanists and tropical fruit enthusiasts. "His Edgehill property was the biggest feather in his cap. People would come from all over the state to check it out."

However, lack of demand for Thomson's fruits in the marketplace at the time forced him to close the Edgehill property in 1972. In a 1989 interview with the San Diego Union-Tribune Thomson told the newspaper that, "I was 20 years ahead of my time...I never made enough to pay the water bill, let alone make any money."

Thomson, an organic farmer, continued to earn his living by budding and grafting fruit trees for grove owners and nurseries throughout California. He also continued to grow cherimoyas and mangoes to be sold throughout Southern California. In particular, Thomson devoted much of his time to propagating tropical and subtropical fruits that would grow in San Diego's North County.

=== California Rare Fruit Growers Association ===
Thomson and John Riley, a Lockheed engineer from Santa Clara, California, and fellow fruit enthusiast, began working together to publish a newsletter beginning in 1960. Riley and Thomson published the early newsletters for years using a mimeograph machine. The newsletter lead to the foundation of the California Rare Fruit Growers Association (CRFG) in 1968, as an organization and clearinghouse for rare exotic fruit enthusiasts, hobbyists and amateur horticulturists. Today the California Rare Fruit Growers publishes a glossy, bimonthly magazine, The Fruit Gardener, an outgrowth of the early, mimeographed newsletters. The California Rare Fruit Growers Association currently has over 3,000 members in approximately 35 countries worldwide. The CRFG claims to be the largest amateur fruit-growing organization in the world.

The association rapidly grew in California during the late 1960s, in part because many newcomers were moving to the state "without prejudice to what could not be grown" in California. Thomson's organization became a driving force behind the growing availability of exotic fruits throughout California's supermarkets and farmers markets.

=== Work on Dudleya ===
Thomson became interested in the Crassulaceae succulents of the genus Dudleya at some point in his life. Dudleya closely resemble the more commonly cultivated Echeverias. Early publications actually listed the Dudleya under either the Echeveria or Cotyledon genera. This genus is primarily native to chaparral habitats in California and Baja California state (Mexico), and consists of approximately 60 named species.

Limited literature and a passion to learn more on the plants that had piqued his interest, Thomson set forth on gathering specimens, assembling species descriptions, drawing habitat location maps and taking photographs which all culminated in him privately publishing the Dudleya and Hassenthaus Handbook in 1993. Of note are his SEM photographs of the flowers. It is one of the few books dedicated to the genus and contains numerous photographs of specimens in the wild and his own collection. However, Thomson failed to follow the International Code of Botanical Nomenclature in place at the time, which invalidated most of his new treatments of species. Despite this, some of the plants Thomson first suggested as distinct were later described properly by other botanists, one example being Dudleya gnoma by Stephen Ward McCabe, which was originally placed as Dudleya nana by Thomson.

Thomson shared his plants freely and supporters provided specimens from their respective collecting trips. Thomson also shared his insights into their hybridization with avid enthusiasts and his findings were later confirmed as naturally occurring, as he had suspected. Most of his collection was lost during a severe freeze. His contributions to the knowledge of the genus Dudleya is overshadowed by his work on the rare fruits.

== See also ==
- American horticulturists
- American orchardists
- Reid Moran
- Dudleya
