= California Rare Fruit Growers, Inc. =

US-based non-profit organization

- Formation: 1968
- Type: non-profit organization
- Formerly called: CRFG

The California Rare Fruit Growers, Inc. (CRFG) is a non-profit organization of rare exotic fruit enthusiasts, hobbyists and amateur horticulturists based in California. The CRFG, founded in 1968, promotes rare fruits in the Southern California marketplace, according to a 1997 article in the Seasonal Chef online newsletter. As of 2008 the CRFG has 3,000 members in approximately 35 countries with 20 Chapters in Western US.

== History ==
The California Rare Fruit Growers was co-founded by Paul Thomson and John Riley in 1968. Thomson was a self-taught botanist and fruit farmer based in San Diego's North County, while Riley was an engineer with Lockheed from Santa Clara, California. Both Thomson and Riley shared an enthusiasm for rare fruits and plants which had not been previously widely cultivated in California. Riley and Thomson soon began collaborating to publish a newsletter on tropical and subtropical fruits using a mimeograph machine. In 1968 they expanded operations to found the CRFG. Membership was swelled by a rapid influx of newcomers to California who were "without prejudice to what could not be grown" in the state.

== Mission statement ==
To encourage and foster public and scientific interest, research, education in and the preservation of rare fruit plants that have edible seeds, fruits, leaves, stems or roots and are not commonly grown commercially. The furtherance and encouragement of these activities shall be for the benefit of the public rather than commercial interests.

== Definition ==
A fruit is considered to be rare because it is:

- Not normally grown in a particular area or climatic zone.
- Scarce or about to be extinct.
- Of unusual properties, such as the miracle fruit which changes the sense of taste.
- A new species that have recently been introduced or discovered.
- A species that has not been grown commercially.

== Publication ==
The CRFG publishes a bimonthly magazine called The Fruit Gardener, an outgrowth of the early newsletters published by Thomson and Riley.

== Chapters ==
South Orange County Chairperson Frank Wagoner

Inland Empire Chairperson Lisa Wright

South Bay Chairperson Judy Daley

Los Angeles Chairperson Anwar Hachache

Foothill Chairperson Alasdair Burton

== Annual meeting ==
CRFG members and the public meets every year to celebrate the Festival of Fruit, an event organized by different chapters. This event includes seminars, workshops, local tours and plant sales.
