= 1979 California Angels season =

Major League Baseball season

1979 California Angels
- American League West champions
- League: American League
- Division: West
- Ballpark: Anaheim Stadium
- City: Anaheim, California
- Record: 88–74 (.543)
- Divisional place: 1st
- Owner: Gene Autry
- General manager: Buzzie Bavasi
- Manager: Jim Fregosi
- Television: KTLA (Don Drysdale, Ron Fairly)
- Radio: KMPC (Don Drysdale, Al Wisk)
- Stats: ESPN.com; Baseball Reference

The 1979 California Angels season was their 19th in Major League Baseball. The Angels reached the postseason for the first time by winning the American League West Division with a record of 88–74, three games ahead of the Kansas City Royals in Jim Fregosi's first season as manager. The Angels were defeated by the Baltimore Orioles 3–1 in the 1979 American League Championship Series. Don Baylor had an outstanding season, playing in all 162 games, scoring 120 runs (tops in the American League), hitting 36 home runs and driving in 139 runs (also leading the American League) on his way to being named the American League Most Valuable Player, gaining 20 of 28 first place votes.

== Offseason ==
- December 4, 1978: Ron Jackson and Danny Goodwin were traded by the Angels to the Minnesota Twins for Dan Ford.
- January 9, 1979: 1979 Major League Baseball draft
  - Al Newman was drafted by the Angels in the 3rd round.
  - Otis Nixon was drafted by the Angels in the 1st round (4th pick) of the secondary phase, but did not sign.
- January 29, 1979: Bobby Jones was released by the Angels.
- February 3, 1979: Ken Landreaux, Dave Engle, Paul Hartzell, and Brad Havens were traded by the Angels to the Minnesota Twins for Rod Carew.
- March 27, 1979: Willie Davis was signed by the California Angels as a free agent.

== Regular season ==
=== Season standings ===
AL West
Team	W	L	Pct.	GB	Home	Road
California Angels	88	74	.543	—	49‍–‍32	39‍–‍42
Kansas City Royals	85	77	.525	3	46‍–‍35	39‍–‍42
Texas Rangers	83	79	.512	5	44‍–‍37	39‍–‍42
Minnesota Twins	82	80	.506	6	39‍–‍42	43‍–‍38
Chicago White Sox	73	87	.456	14	33‍–‍46	40‍–‍41
Seattle Mariners	67	95	.414	21	36‍–‍45	31‍–‍50
Oakland Athletics	54	108	.333	34	31‍–‍50	23‍–‍58

=== Record vs. opponents ===
1979 American League record Sources:
Team	BAL	BOS	CAL	CWS	CLE	DET	KC	MIL	MIN	NYY	OAK	SEA	TEX	TOR
Baltimore	—	8–5	9–3	8–3	8–5	7–6	6–6	8–5	8–4	5–6	8–4	10–2	6–6	11–2
Boston	5–8	—	5–7	5–6	6–7	8–5	8–4	8–4	9–3	5–8	9–3	8–4	6–6	9–4
California	3–9	7–5	—	9–4	6–6	4–8	7–6	7–5	9–4	7–5	10–3	7–6	5–8	7–5
Chicago	3–8	6–5	4–9	—	6–6	3–9	5–8	5–7	5–8	4–8	9–4	5–8	11–2	7–5
Cleveland	5–8	7–6	6–6	6–6	—	6–6	6–6	4–9	8–4	5–8	8–4	7–5	5–7	8–5
Detroit	6–7	5–8	8–4	9–3	6–6	—	5–7	6–7	4–8	7–6	7–5	7–5	6–6	9–4
Kansas City	6–6	4–8	6–7	8–5	6–6	7–5	—	5–7	7–6	5–7	9–4	7–6	6–7	9–3
Milwaukee	5–8	4–8	5–7	7–5	9–4	7–6	7–5	—	8–4	9–4	6–6	9–3	9–3	10–3
Minnesota	4–8	3–9	4–9	8–5	4–8	8–4	6–7	4–8	—	7–5	9–4	10–3	4–9	11–1
New York	6–5	8–5	5–7	8–4	8–5	6–7	7–5	4–9	5–7	—	9–3	6–6	8–4	9–4
Oakland	4–8	3–9	3–10	4–9	4–8	5–7	4–9	6–6	4–9	3–9	—	8–5	2–11	4–8
Seattle	2–10	4–8	6–7	8–5	5–7	5–7	6–7	3–9	3–10	6–6	5–8	—	6–7	8–4
Texas	6–6	6–6	8–5	2–11	7–5	6–6	7–6	3–9	9–4	4–8	11–2	7–6	—	7–5
Toronto	2–11	4–9	5–7	5–7	5–8	4–9	3–9	3–10	1–11	4–9	8–4	4–8	5–7	—

=== Notable transactions ===
- April 19, 1979: Curt Brown was signed as an amateur free agent by the Angels.
- May 4, 1979: Dave Chalk was traded by the Angels to the Texas Rangers for Bert Campaneris.
- July 31, 1979: Terry Humphrey was released by the Angels.

=== Roster ===
1979 California Angels
**Roster**
**Pitchers**: 46 Don Aase; 36 Mike Barlow; 33 Jim Barr; 34 Ralph Botting; 38 Mark Clear; 41 Steve Eddy; 45 Bob Ferris; 37 Dave Frost; 42 Chris Knapp; 17 Dave LaRoche; 41 Dyar Miller; 39 John Montague; 30 Nolan Ryan; 41 Dave Schuler; 40 Frank Tanana	**Catchers**: 23 Tom Donohue; 5 Brian Downing; 9 Terry Humphrey; **Infielders**: 22 Willie Aikens; 14 Jim Anderson; 19 Bert Campaneris; 29 Rod Carew; 4 Bobby Grich; 15 Ike Hampton; 9 John Harris; 12 Carney Lansford; 18 Rance Mulliniks; 2 Orlando Ramírez; 31 Dickie Thon	**Outfielders**: 25 Don Baylor; 32 Bobby Clark; 24 Willie Davis; 15 Dan Ford; 20 Larry Harlow; 3 Rick Miller; 8 Merv Rettenmund; 26 Joe Rudi; **Other batters**: 28,48 Ralph Garr; 7 Brian Harper	**Manager**: 11 Jim Fregosi; **Coaches**: 49 Bob Clear; 6 Deron Johnson; 1 Bobby Knoop; 50 Jimmie Reese; 51 Larry Sherry

=== Game log ===
1979 Game Log: 88–74 (Home: 49–32; Away: 39–42)
April: 15–8 (Home: 7–6; Away: 8–2)

#	Date	Opponent	Score	Win	Loss	Save	Attendance	Record	Streak
1	April 4	@ Mariners	4–5				37,748	0–1	L1
2	April 6	@ Mariners	6–14				8,831	0–2	L2
3	April 7	@ Mariners	5–4				18,010	1–2	W1
4	April 8	@ Mariners	7–5				9,183	2–2	W2
5	April 10	Twins	1–8				33,171	2–3	L1
6	April 11	Twins	11–2				21,633	3–3	W1
7	April 12	Twins	7–1				22,211	4–3	W2
8	April 13	@ Athletics	10–1				2,985	5–3	W3
9	April 14	@ Athletics	9–3				2,649	6–3	W4
10	April 15	@ Athletics	8–1				2,243	7–3	W5
11	April 17	@ Twins	6–0				37,529	8–3	W6
12	April 18	@ Twins	11–6				3,776	9–3	W7
13	April 19	@ Twins	6–4				3,537	10–3	W8
14	April 20	Athletics	7–4				27,417	11–3	W9
15	April 21	Athletics	13–1				34,728	12–3	W10
16	April 22	Athletics	6–7				36,130	12–4	L1
17	April 24	Orioles	2–7				22,343	12–5	L2
18	April 25	Orioles	2–5				19,939	12–6	L3
19	April 26	Orioles	2–4				21,598	12–7	L4
20	April 27	Red Sox	8–6				29,408	13–7	W1
21	April 28	Red Sox	5–0				41,954	14–7	W2
22	April 29	Red Sox	0–2				35,206	14–8	L1
23	April 30	Yankees	2–1				37,180	15–8	W1

May: 15–12 (Home: 7–1; Away: 8–11)

#	Date	Opponent	Score	Win	Loss	Save	Attendance	Record	Streak
24	May 1	Yankees	8–12 (11)				38,858	15–9	L1
25	May 2	Yankees	1–0				40,648	16–9	W1
	May 4	@ Orioles	Postponed (rain). Makeup: July 19						
26	May 5	@ Orioles	1–9				20,455	16–10	L1
27	May 6	@ Orioles	0–6				25,630	16–11	L2
28	May 7	@ Red Sox	4–9				23,319	16–12	L3
29	May 8	@ Red Sox	10–2				21,160	17–12	W1
30	May 9	@ Red Sox	8–9				24,815	17–12	L1
31	May 10	@ Red Sox	5–3				24,990	18–13	W1
32	May 11	@ Yankees	4–1				37,988	19–13	W1
33	May 12	@ Yankees	5–6				28,783	19–14	L1
34	May 13	@ Yankees	10–12				30,083	19–15	L2
35	May 15	Brewers	2–1				21,235	20–15	W1
36	May 16	Brewers	4–3 (11)				21,533	21–15	W2
37	May 17	Brewers	8–5				22,060	22–15	W3
38	May 18	White Sox	7–3				25,598	23–15	W4
39	May 19	White Sox	10–6				41,941	24–15	W5
40	May 20	White Sox	4–0				27,189	25–15	W6
41	May 22	@ Brewers	1–7				9,857	25–16	L1
42	May 23	@ Brewers	0–1				8,408	25–17	L2
43	May 24	@ Brewers	6–7				16,314	25–18	L3
44	May 25	@ White Sox	1–6				20,554	25–19	L4
45	May 26	@ White Sox	8–4				31,576	26–19	W1
46	May 27	@ White Sox	4–2				25,025	27–19	W2
47	May 27	@ White Sox	9–1				25,025	28–19	W3
48	May 29	@ Mariners	6–4				4,068	29–19	W4
49	May 30	@ Mariners	3–2				5,206	30–19	W5
50	May 31	@ Mariners	10–12				5,266	30–20	L1

June: 14–15 (Home: 7–9; Away: 7–6)

#	Date	Opponent	Score	Win	Loss	Save	Attendance	Record	Streak
51	June 1	Indians	4–7				20,070	30–21	L2
52	June 2	Indians	5–2				41,969	31–21	W1
53	June 3	Indians	3–5				24,409	31–22	L1
54	June 4	Blue Jays	4–2				16,979	32–22	W1
55	June 5	Blue Jays	3–0				18,862	33–22	W2
56	June 6	Blue Jays	4–5				18,835	33–23	L1
57	June 8	Tigers	6–4				28,298	34–23	W1
58	June 9	Tigers	9–1				36,499	35–23	W2
59	June 10	Tigers	7–10				30,229	35–24	L1
60	June 11	@ Indians	9–4				10,674	36–24	W1
61	June 12	@ Indians	10–11				9,945	36–25	L1
62	June 13	@ Blue Jays	8–9				28,577	36–26	L2
63	June 13	@ Blue Jays	10–2				28,577	37–26	W1
64	June 14	@ Blue Jays	10–2				15,097	38–26	W2
65	June 15	@ Tigers	8–7				41,151	39–26	W3
66	June 16	@ Tigers	4–2				39,240	40–26	W4
67	June 17	@ Tigers	4–8				32,744	40–27	L1
68	June 18	Rangers	5–0				37,096	41–27	W1
69	June 19	Rangers	1–2				26,553	41–28	L1
70	June 20	Rangers	5–4				26,895	42–28	W1
71	June 21	Rangers	2–3 (11)				26,422	42–29	L1
72	June 22	Royals	5–9				30,737	42–30	L2
73	June 23	Royals	4–13				41,002	42–31	L3
74	June 24	Royals	2–5				32,210	42–32	L4
75	June 26	@ Rangers	1–2				28,695	42–33	L5
76	June 27	@ Rangers	2–4				28,899	42–34	L6
77	June 28	@ Rangers	4–14				29,101	42–35	L7
78	June 29	@ Royals	6–5 (11)				36,705	43–35	W1
79	June 30	@ Royals	8–5				41,451	44–35	W2

July: 17–11 (Home: 13–5; Away: 4–6)

#	Date	Opponent	Score	Win	Loss	Save	Attendance	Record	Streak
80	July 1	@ Royals	14–2				32,636	45–35	W3
81	July 2	Athletics	8–3				27,639	46–35	W4
82	July 3	Athletics	3–0				22,498	47–35	W5
83	July 4	Athletics	17–6				41,958	48–35	W6
84	July 5	Athletics	0–3				23,793	48–36	L1
85	July 6	Orioles	7–3				24,679	49–36	W1
86	July 7	Orioles	10–1				37,382	50–36	W2
87	July 8	Orioles	2–7				29,062	50–37	L1
88	July 9	Red Sox	6–0				27,692	51–37	W1
89	July 10	Red Sox	4–3				36,619	52–37	W2
90	July 11	Red Sox	3–9				39,210	52–38	L1
91	July 13	Yankees	6–1				41,805	53–38	W1
92	July 14	Yankees	8–7 (12)				41,693	54–38	W2
93	July 15	Yankees	5–4				40,739	55–38	W3
94	July 19	@ Orioles	4–3 (11)				33,603	56–38	W1
95	July 19	@ Orioles	0–3				33,603	56–39	L1
96	July 20	@ Orioles	1–2				25,682	56–40	L2
97	July 21	@ Orioles	2–10				51,381	56–41	L3
98	July 22	@ Red Sox	5–6 (10)				35,172	56–42	L4
99	July 23	@ Red Sox	9–2				35,024	57–42	W1
100	July 24	@ Yankees	5–6				33,497	57–43	L1
101	July 25	@ Yankees	9–5				47,449	58–43	W1
102	July 26	@ Yankees	0–2				43,136	58–44	L1
103	July 27	Twins	1–3				38,945	58–45	L2
104	July 28	Twins	5–0				41,891	59–45	W1
105	July 29	Twins	9–3				33,510	60–45	W2
106	July 30	Mariners	0–8				35,548	60–46	L1
107	July 31	Mariners	8–1				25,198	61–46	W1

August: 11–17 (Home: 5–8; Away: 6–9)

#	Date	Opponent	Score	Win	Loss	Save	Attendance	Record	Streak
108	August 1	Mariners	6–7				29,446	61–47	L1
109	August 3	@ Twins	1–4				30,653	61–48	L2
110	August 4	@ Twins	7–1				26,084	62–48	W1
111	August 5	@ Twins	11–7				41,182	63–48	W2
112	August 5	@ Twins	1–7				41,182	63–49	L1
113	August 6	@ Athletics	5–2				8,160	64–49	W1
114	August 7	@ Athletics	5–9				2,905	64–50	L1
115	August 8	@ Athletics	8–1				3,463	65–50	W1
116	August 10	Mariners	6–8 (14)				28,969	65–51	L1
117	August 11	Mariners	8–1				41,940	66–51	W1
118	August 12	Mariners	4–3				27,345	67–51	W2
119	August 13	Tigers	3–5				34,032	67–52	L1
120	August 14	Tigers	3–6				29,465	67–53	L2
121	August 15	Tigers	1–6				31,885	67–54	L3
122	August 17	Blue Jays	5–6				25,050	67–55	L4
123	August 18	Blue Jays	7–5				30,361	68–55	W1
124	August 19	Blue Jays	4–2				23,814	69–55	W2
125	August 20	Indians	6–5				35,497	70–55	W3
126	August 21	Indians	7–12				30,902	70–56	L1
127	August 22	Indians	3–13				30,625	70–57	L2
128	August 24	@ Blue Jays	4–6				18,077	70–58	L3
129	August 25	@ Blue Jays	24–2				25,207	71–58	W1
130	August 26	@ Blue Jays	3–9				22,619	71–59	L1
131	August 27	@ Tigers	2–3				22,874	71–60	L2
132	August 28	@ Tigers	2–12				19,178	71–61	L3
133	August 29	@ Tigers	1–2				19,880	71–62	L4
134	August 30	@ Indians	1–7				8,647	71–63	L5
135	August 31	@ Indians	9–8				10,501	72–63	W1

September: 16–11 (Home: 10–3; Away: 6–8)

#	Date	Opponent	Score	Win	Loss	Save	Attendance	Record	Streak
136	September 1	@ Indians	7–4				22,804	73–63	W2
137	September 2	@ Indians	5–2				6,359	74–63	W3
138	September 3	White Sox	6–5				34,684	75–63	W4
139	September 4	White Sox	7–10				26,036	75–64	L1
140	September 5	White Sox	9–8				23,705	76–64	W1
141	September 6	White Sox	10–9				20,930	77–64	W2
142	September 7	Brewers	6–3				30,685	78–64	W3
143	September 8	Brewers	3–2				37,624	79–64	W4
144	September 9	Brewers	5–2				27,341	80–64	W5
145	September 11	@ White Sox	7–8				6,858	80–65	L1
146	September 12	@ White Sox	5–11				7,551	80–66	L2
147	September 14	@ Brewers	8–7				17,840	81–66	W1
148	September 15	@ Brewers	2–3				45,732	81–67	L1
149	September 16	@ Brewers	1–2				19,906	81–68	L2
150	September 17	@ Royals	4–16				38,327	81–69	L3
151	September 18	@ Royals	6–4				29,733	82–69	W1
152	September 19	@ Royals	4–6				31,412	82–70	L1
153	September 20	@ Royals	11–6				32,659	83–70	W1
154	September 21	Rangers	1–3				37,450	83–71	L1
155	September 22	Rangers	3–1				33,730	84–71	W1
156	September 23	Rangers	6–1				41,498	85–71	W2
157	September 24	Royals	4–3				40,423	86–71	W3
158	September 25	Royals	4–1				40,631	87–71	W4
159	September 26	Royals	0–4				40,565	87–72	L1
160	September 28	@ Rangers	0–5				11,965	87–73	L2
161	September 29	@ Rangers	3–6				19,167	87–74	L3
162	September 30	@ Rangers	11–5				9,086	88–74	W1

Legend: = Win = Loss = Postponement
Bold = Angels team member

== Player stats ==
= Indicates team leader

= Indicates league leader

=== Batting ===
==== Starters by position ====
Note: Pos = Position; G = Games played; AB = At bats; H = Hits; Avg. = Batting average; HR = Home runs; RBI = Runs batted in

Pos	Player	G	AB	H	Avg.	HR	RBI
C	Brian Downing	148	509	166	.326	12	75
1B	Rod Carew	110	409	130	.318	3	44
2B	Bobby Grich	153	534	157	.294	30	101
3B	Carney Lansford	157	654	188	.287	19	79
SS	Bert Campaneris	85	239	56	.234	0	15
LF	Don Baylor	162	628	186	.296	36	139
CF	Rick Miller	120	427	125	.293	2	28
RF	Dan Ford	142	569	165	.290	21	101
DH	Willie Aikens	116	379	106	.280	21	81

==== Other batters ====
Note: G = Games played; AB = At bats; H = Hits; Avg. = Batting average; HR = Home runs; RBI = Runs batted in

Player	G	AB	H	Avg.	HR	RBI
Joe Rudi	90	330	80	.242	11	61
Jim Anderson	96	234	58	.248	3	23
Larry Harlow	62	159	37	.233	0	14
Tom Donohue	38	107	24	.224	3	14
Merv Rettenmund	35	76	20	.263	1	10
Rance Mulliniks	22	68	10	.147	1	8
Willie Davis	43	56	14	.250	0	2
Dickie Thon	35	56	19	.339	0	8
Bobby Clark	19	54	16	.296	1	5
Ralph Garr	6	24	3	.125	0	0
Terry Humphrey	9	17	1	.059	0	0
Orlando Ramírez	13	12	0	.000	0	0
Ike Hampton	4	5	2	.400	0	0
Brian Harper	1	2	0	.000	0	0
John Harris	1	2	0	.000	0	0

=== Pitching ===
==== Starting pitchers ====
Note: G = Games pitched; IP = Innings pitched; W = Wins; L = Losses; ERA = Earned run average; SO = Strikeouts

Player	G	IP	W	L	ERA	SO
Dave Frost	36	239.0	16	10	3.57	107
Nolan Ryan	34	223.0	16	14	3.60	223
Jim Barr	36	197.0	10	12	4.20	69
Don Aase	37	185.1	9	10	4.81	96
Chris Knapp	20	98.0	5	5	5.51	36
Frank Tanana	17	90.1	7	5	3.89	46

==== Other pitchers ====
Player	G	IP	W	L	ERA	SO
Steve Eddy	7	32.1	1	1	4.73	7

==== Relief pitchers ====
Note: G = Games pitched; W = Wins; L = Losses; SV = Saves; ERA = Earned run average; SO = Strikeouts

Player	G	W	L	SV	ERA	SO
Mark Clear	52	11	5	14	3.63	98
Dave LaRoche	53	7	11	10	5.57	59
Mike Barlow	35	1	1	0	5.13	33
Dyar Miller	14	1	0	0	3.31	16
John Montague	14	2	0	6	5.09	6
Ralph Botting	12	2	0	0	8.80	22
Bob Ferris	2	0	0	0	1.50	2
Dave Schuler	1	0	0	0	10.80	0

== ALCS ==
The Baltimore Orioles defeated the Angels, three games to one.

=== Postseason game log ===
1979 Postseason Game Log (1–3)
American League Championship Series vs. Baltimore Orioles

#	Date	Opponent	Score	Win	Loss	Save	Attendance	Series
1	October 3	@ Orioles	3–6 (11)	Stanhouse (1–0)	**Montague** (0–1)		52,787	0–1
2	October 4	@ Orioles	8–9	Flanagan (1–0)	**Frost** (0–1)		52,108	0–2
3	October 5	Orioles	4–3	**Aase** (1–0)	Stanhouse (1–1)		43,199	1–2
4	October 6	Orioles	0–8	McGregor (1–0)	**Knapp** (0–1)		43,199	1–3

Legend: = Win = Loss = Postponement
Bold = Angels team member

== Awards and honors ==
- Don Baylor, American League MVP

== Farm system ==
Level	Team	League	Manager
AAA	Salt Lake City Gulls	Pacific Coast League	Jimy Williams
AA	El Paso Diablos	Texas League	Moose Stubing
A	Salinas Packers	California League	Chris Cannizzaro
Rookie	Idaho Falls Angels	Pioneer League	Reuben Rodriguez

LEAGUE CHAMPIONS: Salt Lake City

Records
Preceded by 1978	California Angels seasons 1979	Succeeded by 1980
