= 1980 California Angels season =

Major League Baseball season

1980 California Angels
- League: American League
- Division: West
- Ballpark: Anaheim Stadium
- City: Anaheim, California
- Record: 65–95 (.406)
- Divisional place: 6th
- Owner: Gene Autry
- General manager: Buzzie Bavasi
- Manager: Jim Fregosi
- Television: KTLA (Ron Fairly, Bob Starr, Steve Shannon)
- Radio: KMPC (Steve Bailey, Bob Starr, Steve Shannon)
- Stats: ESPN.com; Baseball Reference

The 1980 California Angels season was the 20th season of the Angels franchise in the American League, the 15th in Anaheim, and their 15th season playing their home games at Anaheim Stadium.

The Angels finished sixth in the American League West with a record of 65 wins and 95 losses.

== Offseason ==
- November 16, 1979: Bruce Kison was signed as a free agent by the Angels.
- December 6, 1979: The Angels traded Willie Aikens and Rance Mulliniks to the Kansas City Royals, in exchange for Al Cowens, Todd Cruz, and a player to be named later.
- January 11, 1980: Kevin Romine was drafted by the Angels in the 3rd round of the 1980 Major League Baseball draft, but did not sign.
- March 30, 1980: Danny Boone was released by the Angels.
- April 1, 1980: The Angels received Craig Eaton from the Royals, completing the trade of December 6.

== Regular season ==
=== Season standings ===
AL West
Team	W	L	Pct.	GB	Home	Road
Kansas City Royals	97	65	.599	—	49‍–‍32	48‍–‍33
Oakland Athletics	83	79	.512	14	46‍–‍35	37‍–‍44
Minnesota Twins	77	84	.478	19½	44‍–‍36	33‍–‍48
Texas Rangers	76	85	.472	20½	39‍–‍41	37‍–‍44
Chicago White Sox	70	90	.438	26	37‍–‍42	33‍–‍48
California Angels	65	95	.406	31	30‍–‍51	35‍–‍44
Seattle Mariners	59	103	.364	38	36‍–‍45	23‍–‍58

=== Record vs. opponents ===
1980 American League record Sources:
Team	BAL	BOS	CAL	CWS	CLE	DET	KC	MIL	MIN	NYY	OAK	SEA	TEX	TOR
Baltimore	—	8–5	10–2	6–6	6–7	10–3	6–6	7–6	10–2	7–6	7–5	6–6	6–6	11–2
Boston	5–8	—	9–3	6–4	7–6	8–5	5–7	6–7	6–6	3–10	9–3	7–5	5–7	7–6
California	2–10	3–9	—	3–10	4–6	5–7	5–8	6–6	7–6	2–10	3–10	11–2	11–2	3–9
Chicago	6–6	4–6	10–3	—	5–7	2–10	5–8	5–7	5–8	5–7	6–7	6–7	6–7–2	5–7
Cleveland	7–6	6–7	6–4	7–5	—	3–10	5–7	3–10	9–3	5–8	6–6	8–4	6–6	8–5
Detroit	3–10	5–8	7–5	10–2	10–3	—	2–10	7–6	6–6	5–8	6–6	10–2–1	4–8	9–4
Kansas City	6–6	7–5	8–5	8–5	7–5	10–2	—	6–6	5–8	8–4	6–7	7–6	10–3	9–3
Milwaukee	6–7	7–6	6–6	7–5	10–3	6–7	6–6	—	7–5	5–8	7–5	9–3	5–7	5–8
Minnesota	2–10	6–6	6–7	8–5	3–9	6–6	8–5	5–7	—	4–8	6–7	7–6	9–3	7–5
New York	6–7	10–3	10–2	7–5	8–5	8–5	4–8	8–5	8–4	—	8–4	9–3	7–5	10–3
Oakland	5–7	3–9	10–3	7–6	6–6	6–6	7–6	5–7	7–6	4–8	—	8–5	7–6	8–4
Seattle	6–6	5–7	2–11	7–6	4–8	2–10–1	6–7	3–9	6–7	3–9	5–8	—	4–9	6–6
Texas	6–6	7–5	2–11	7–6–2	6–6	8–4	3–10	7–5	3–9	5–7	6–7	9–4	—	7–5
Toronto	2–11	6–7	9–3	7–5	5–8	4–9	3–9	8–5	5–7	3–10	4–8	6–6	5–7	—

=== Opening Day starters ===
- Don Baylor
- Rod Carew
- Al Cowens
- Brian Downing
- Dan Ford
- Dave Frost
- Bobby Grich
- Carney Lansford
- Freddie Patek
- Joe Rudi

=== Notable transactions ===
- May 13, 1980: Dave Skaggs was purchased by the Angels from the Baltimore Orioles.
- May 27, 1980: Al Cowens was traded by the Angels to the Detroit Tigers in exchange for Jason Thompson
- June 3, 1980: Bill Mooneyham was drafted by the Angels in the 1st round (10th pick) of the secondary phase of the 1980 Major League Baseball draft.
- June 12, 1980: Todd Cruz was traded by the Angels to the Chicago White Sox in exchange for Randy Scarbery.
- June 24, 1980: Merv Rettenmund was released by the Angels.

=== Roster ===
1980 California Angels
Roster
Pitchers: 46 Don Aase; 33 Jim Barr; 34 Ralph Botting; 38 Mark Clear; 43 Jim Dorsey; 44 Bob Ferris; 37 Dave Frost; 28 Ed Halicki; 41 Andy Hassler; 24 Bruce Kison; 42 Chris Knapp; 17 Dave LaRoche; 45 Dave Lemanczyk; 27 Alfredo Martínez; 39 John Montague; 47 Dave Schuler; 40 Frank Tanana	Catchers: 16 Stan Cliburn; 23 Tom Donohue; 9 Brian Downing; 8 Dave Skaggs; 36 Dan Whitmer; Infielders: 19 Bert Campaneris; 29 Rod Carew; 14 Todd Cruz; 4 Bobby Grich; 18 John Harris; 5 Carney Lansford; 2 Freddie Patek; 22 Jason Thompson; 31 Dickie Thon	Outfielders: 25 Don Baylor; 32 Bobby Clark; 18 Al Cowens; 15 Dan Ford; 48 Ralph Garr; 20 Larry Harlow; 7,14 Gil Kubski; 3 Rick Miller; 26 Joe Rudi; Other batters: 7 Merv Rettenmund	Manager: 11 Jim Fregosi; Coaches: 49 Bob Clear; 6 Deron Johnson; 1 Bobby Knoop; 50 Jimmie Reese; 51 Larry Sherry

== Player stats ==
=== Batting ===
==== Starters by position ====
Note: Pos = Position; G = Games played; AB = At bats; H = Hits; Avg. = Batting average; HR = Home runs; RBI = Runs batted in

Pos	Player	G	AB	H	Avg.	HR	RBI
C	Tom Donohue	84	218	41	.188	2	14
1B	Rod Carew	144	540	179	.331	3	59
2B	Bobby Grich	150	498	135	.271	14	62
SS	Freddie Patek	86	273	72	.264	5	34
3B	Carney Lansford	151	602	157	.261	15	80
LF	Joe Rudi	104	372	88	.237	16	53
CF	Rick Miller	129	412	113	.274	2	38
RF	Larry Harlow	109	301	83	.276	4	27
DH	Jason Thompson	102	312	99	.317	17	70

==== Other batters ====
Note: G = Games played; AB = At bats; H = Hits; Avg. = Batting average; HR = Home runs; RBI = Runs batted in

Player	G	AB	H	Avg.	HR	RBI
Don Baylor	90	340	85	.250	5	51
Dickie Thon	80	267	68	.255	0	15
Bobby Clark	78	261	60	.230	5	23
Dan Ford	65	226	63	.279	7	26
Bert Campaneris	77	210	53	.252	2	18
Al Cowens	34	119	27	.227	1	17
Brian Downing	30	93	27	.290	2	25
Dan Whitmer	48	87	21	.241	0	7
Dave Skaggs	24	66	13	.197	1	9
Gil Kubski	22	63	16	.254	0	6
Stan Cliburn	54	56	10	.179	2	6
Ralph Garr	21	42	8	.190	0	3
John Harris	19	41	12	.293	2	7
Todd Cruz	18	40	11	.275	1	5
Merv Rettenmund	3	4	1	.250	0	0

=== Pitching ===
==== Starting pitchers ====
Note: G = Games pitched; IP = Innings pitched; W = Wins; L = Losses; ERA = Earned run average; SO = Strikeouts

Player	G	IP	W	L	ERA	SO
Frank Tanana	32	204.0	11	12	4.15	113
Alfredo Martínez	30	149.1	7	9	4.52	57
Dave Frost	15	78.1	4	8	5.29	28
Bruce Kison	13	73.1	3	6	4.91	28
Ralph Botting	6	26.1	0	3	5.81	12
Jim Dorsey	4	15.2	1	2	9.19	8

==== Other pitchers ====
Note: G = Games pitched; IP = Innings pitched; W = Wins; L = Losses; ERA = Earned run average; SO = Strikeouts

Player	G	IP	W	L	ERA	SO
Don Aase	40	175.0	8	13	4.06	74
Dave LaRoche	52	128.0	3	5	4.08	89
Chris Knapp	32	117.1	2	11	6.14	46
Jim Barr	24	68.0	1	4	5.56	22
Ed Halicki	10	35.1	3	1	4.84	16
Bob Ferris	5	15.1	0	2	5.87	4

==== Relief pitchers ====
Note: G = Games pitched; W = Wins; L = Losses; SV = Saves; ERA = Earned run average; SO = Strikeouts

Player	G	W	L	SV	ERA	SO
Andy Hassler	41	5	1	10	2.49	75
Mark Clear	58	11	11	9	3.30	105
John Montague	37	4	2	3	5.13	22
Dave Lemanczyk	21	2	4	0	4.32	19
Dave Schuler	8	0	1	0	3.55	7

== Farm system ==
Level	Team	League	Manager
AAA	Salt Lake City Gulls	Pacific Coast League	Moose Stubing
AA	El Paso Diablos	Texas League	Jim Saul
A	Salinas Packers	California League	Tom Zimmer
Rookie	Idaho Falls Angels	Pioneer League	Reuben Rodriguez

Records
Preceded by 1979	California Angels seasons 1980	Succeeded by 1981
