= 1979 American League Championship Series =

11th edition of Major League Baseball's American League Championship Series

Team (Wins)	Managers	Season
Baltimore Orioles (3)	Earl Weaver	102–57, .642, GA: 8
California Angels (1)	Jim Fregosi	88–74, .543, GA: 3
- Dates: October 3–6
- Umpires: Larry Barnett; Dale Ford; Jim Evans; Don Denkinger (crew chief); Al Clark; Greg Kosc

Broadcast
- Television: NBC; KTLA (CAL); WMAR-TV (BAL)
- TV announcers: NBC: Dick Enberg, Wes Parker and Sparky Anderson; KTLA: Don Drysdale, Ron Fairly and Al Wisk; WMAR-TV: Chuck Thompson and Brooks Robinson
- Radio: CBS
- Radio announcers: Ernie Harwell and Bill White

The 1979 American League Championship Series was a best-of-five series that was the semifinal on the American League side of the 1979 postseason, which pitted the East Division champion Baltimore Orioles against the West Division champion California Angels, who were making their first postseason appearance. The Orioles won the Series three games to one and lost to the Pittsburgh Pirates in the 1979 World Series.

This was the only ALCS between 1971 and 1981 that did not feature either the Oakland Athletics or the Kansas City Royals.

== Summary ==
=== California Angels vs. Baltimore Orioles ===
Baltimore won the series, 3–1.

Game	Date	Score	Location	Time	Attendance
1	October 3	California Angels – 3, Baltimore Orioles – 6 (10)	Memorial Stadium	3:10	52,787
2	October 4	California Angels – 8, Baltimore Orioles – 9	Memorial Stadium	2:51	52,108
3	October 5	Baltimore Orioles – 3, California Angels – 4	Anaheim Stadium	2:59	43,199
4	October 6	Baltimore Orioles – 8, California Angels – 0	Anaheim Stadium	2:56	43,199

== Game summaries ==
=== Game 1 ===
October 3, 1979 8:30 pm (ET) at Memorial Stadium in Baltimore, Maryland 66 °F (19 °C) mostly cloudy
Team	1	2	3	4	5	6	7	8	9	10	R	H	E
California	1	0	1	0	0	1	0	0	0	0	3	7	1
Baltimore	0	0	2	1	0	0	0	0	0	3	6	6	0
WP: Don Stanhouse (1–0) LP: John Montague (0–1); Home runs: CAL: Dan Ford (1); BAL: John Lowenstein (1)

Game 1 matched up two Hall-of-Famers, as Nolan Ryan, in his final season with the Angels, took on the Orioles' Jim Palmer. The Angels jumped out to an early lead when Dan Ford homered in the top of the first, then extended the lead to 2–0 in the third when Rick Miller singled and scored on Ford's double. The Orioles tied it in the bottom of the third when Doug DeCinces reached on a two-base error by Bobby Grich, Rick Dempsey doubled to left and scored DeCinces, and a single by light-hitting Mark Belanger scored Dempsey with the tying run.

In the bottom of the fourth, Baltimore's Pat Kelly singled, stole second, went to third on a wild pitch and scored on a sacrifice fly. A Rod Carew single and a Grich double tied it in the sixth, and the game stayed tied until the tenth. John Montague gave up a single to DeCinces, who moved to second on a bunt by Rich Dauer. Terry Crowley pinch-hit for Dempsey and popped to center. Hoping to get to Belanger, a .167 hitter during the season, the Angels walked Al Bumbry. Pinch-hitter John Lowenstein then hit a three-run walk-off homer to take Game 1 for the Orioles, 6–3. Don Stanhouse was the winner while Montague wound up the loser. The win gave the Orioles a 1–0 lead in the best-of-five series.

=== Game 2 ===
October 4, 1979 3:15 pm (ET) at Memorial Stadium in Baltimore, Maryland 75 °F (24 °C) mostly cloudy
Team	1	2	3	4	5	6	7	8	9	R	H	E
California	1	0	0	0	0	1	1	3	2	8	10	1
Baltimore	4	4	1	0	0	0	0	0	X	9	11	1
WP: Mike Flanagan (1–0) LP: Dave Frost (0–1); Home runs: CAL: Dan Ford (2); BAL: Eddie Murray (1)

In Game 2, which pitted eventual Cy Young Award winner Mike Flanagan against Dave Frost, a sensational comeback effort by the Angels fell just short and the Orioles swept the home games to take a 2–0 lead in the best of five series. And the early going was all Orioles.

For the second straight day, Dan Ford hit a first-inning homer to give the Angels a 1–0 lead. But the Orioles came back quickly in the bottom of the first. Bumbry singled and stole second, and Kiko Garcia walked. The inning seemed harmless when Frost got Ken Singleton to ground into a 6–4–3 double play that put Bumbry at third with two out. But Eddie Murray singled to tie it, Lowenstein walked, Pat Kelly singled to score Murray, and DeCinces' single plus a Dan Ford error plated two runs to give the Orioles a quick 4–1 lead.

After Dempsey grounded out to lead off the second, Bumbry again singled and again stole second. After Garcia's single scored Bumbry, Halos manager Jim Fregosi replaced Frost with Mark Clear, who promptly gave up a single to Singleton and a three-run homer to Murray to give ace Flanagan a seemingly insurmountable 8–1 lead after two innings. A DeCinces walk preceded singles by Bumbry and Garcia to make it 9–1 after three.

The Angels, however, fought back valiantly. In the sixth, a Carew double and Carney Lansford single made it 9–2. Singles by eventual league MVP Don Baylor and Brian Downing followed by a sacrifice fly from Grich made it 9–3. In the eighth, the Angels got within striking distance by scoring three runs and chasing Flanagan. The inning began with a walk to pinch hitter Merv Rettenmund, who Dickie Thon replaced at first. A Murray error put two on with nobody out, and Lansford's single sent Thon home with the fourth run and Flanagan to the showers. Don Stanhouse, known by the moniker "Stan The Man Unusual" took the hill with Carew at third, Lansford at first and nobody out. He got Ford to line out to second for the first out of the inning, but Baylor's single scored Carew and sent Lansford to third. Stanhouse then got Downing on a sacrifice fly that scored Lansford and ended the inning on ground out to Grich. But the Angels, left for dead a few innings earlier, were back in it.

In the ninth, pinch hitter Larry Harlow walked but was forced at second by Rick Miller. Long-time Dodger standout Willie Davis, playing in his last professional game, pinch-hit for Thon and doubled to left, putting runners at second and third and the tying run at the plate was Carew. Carew grounded to second for the second out, while Miller scored and Davis went to third. With two outs and the tying run at the plate, Carney Lansford singled to make it 9–8. Dan Ford continued his rather fine LCS with a single that put the tying run at third. Baylor was walked to load the bases with two outs, but Stanhouse put an end to the proceedings by inducing Downing to ground to DeCinces at third to end the game.

Despite a valiant comeback effort, the Angels now were facing elimination.

=== Game 3 ===
October 5, 1979 5:30 pm (PT) at Anaheim Stadium in Anaheim, California 70 °F (21 °C) mostly clear
Team	1	2	3	4	5	6	7	8	9	R	H	E
Baltimore	0	0	0	1	0	1	1	0	0	3	8	3
California	1	0	0	1	0	0	0	0	2	4	9	0
WP: Don Aase (1–0) LP: Don Stanhouse (1–1); Home runs: BAL: None; CAL: Don Baylor (1)

Two outs from making it to the World Series, the Orioles had to wait another day as the Angels rallied in the bottom of the ninth inning to take game three and cut Baltimore's lead in the series to 2–1. This was the Angels' first playoff victory ever.

The Orioles' Dennis Martínez took the mound against the Angels' Frank Tanana, and small ball netted the Halos a run in the first when Lansford singled, stole second, and came home on Ford's single to make it 1–0 California. The Orioles tied it in the fourth when Singleton doubled, moved to third on Murray's single and scored on Lee May's follow-up single. The Angels regained the lead in the bottom of the fourth when Baylor homered to make it 2–1. The O's tied it in the sixth, but left the dugout angry when they turned bases loaded and nobody out into only one run.

Singleton reached on a base hit to center off reliever Don Aase and Murray followed with another single. A walk to May loaded the bases and brought Don Aase in to relieve Tanana. Aase got out of the jam when DeCinces hit a sacrifice fly to center that scored Singleton, pinch hitter John Lowenstein walked, and Rich Dauer hit a seeming sacrifice fly to center for the second out that Rick Miller turned into a double play by gunning down Murray at home to keep the score 2–2.

In the seventh inning, Al Bumbry tripled and scored on Terry Crowley's single to give the Orioles their first lead of the day. It stayed that way until the ninth. Martinez had his work cut out for him as the three hitters he was scheduled to face were 1979 AL MVP Baylor, eight-time batting champion and eventual Hall of Famer Carew, and Downing, who had finished third in the league in hitting. He got Baylor to fly out, but Carew doubled, causing Baltimore manager Earl Weaver to yank Martinez and replace him with Don Stanhouse. A walk to Downing put the winning run on first, and disaster struck when Bumbry dropped a fly ball by Grich that scored Carew to tie it and put Downing on second with only one out. Larry Harlow then doubled to center, giving the Angels a dramatic 4-3 victory.

Aase got the win with four innings of relief while Stanhouse, who faced only three hitters got the loss.

=== Game 4 ===
October 6, 1979 12:15 pm (PT) at Anaheim Stadium in Anaheim, California 74 °F (23 °C) sunny
Team	1	2	3	4	5	6	7	8	9	R	H	E
Baltimore	0	0	2	1	0	0	5	0	0	8	12	1
California	0	0	0	0	0	0	0	0	0	0	6	0
WP: Scott McGregor (1–0) LP: Chris Knapp (0–1); Home runs: BAL: Pat Kelly (1); CAL: None

Scott McGregor closed out the series for the Orioles by pitching a complete-game shutout gem, allowing only six hits (all singles) and getting out of a bases loaded situation in the 5th. In the third, Baltimore loaded the bases on two singles and a walk off of Chris Knapp with no outs when Ken Singleton's sacrifice fly and Eddie Murray's RBI single put them up 2–0. Next inning, Doug DeCinces doubled with one out off of Dave LaRoche, then scored on Rick Dempsey's double. In the seventh, Dempsey drew a leadoff walk and scored on Singleton's two-out double. After an intentional walk, Gary Roenicke's RBI single made it 5–0 Orioles. John Montague relieved Dave Frost and allowed a three-run home run to Pat Kelly to cap the scoring at 8–0 Orioles.

== Composite box ==
1979 ALCS (3–1): Baltimore Orioles over California Angels

Team	1	2	3	4	5	6	7	8	9	10	R	H	E
Baltimore Orioles	4	4	5	3	0	1	6	0	0	3	26	37	5
California Angels	3	0	1	1	0	2	1	3	4	0	15	32	2
Total attendance: 191,293 Average attendance: 47,823
