= Buzzie Bavasi =

American baseball executive (1914–2008)

- Born: December 12, 1914; Manhattan, New York, U.S.
- Died: May 1, 2008 (aged 93); San Diego, California, U.S.
- Education: DePauw University
- Occupation: Baseball executive
- Spouse: Evit Rice (m. 1940)
- Children: 4; including Peter and Bill
- Baseball career

Teams
- As general manager: Brooklyn/Los Angeles Dodgers (1951–1968); California Angels (1978–1984); As president: San Diego Padres (1969–1976)

Career highlights and awards
- 4x World Series champion (1955, 1959, 1963, 1965); San Diego Padres Hall of Fame

Emil Joseph "Buzzie" Bavasi (/bəˈveɪzi/; December 12, 1914 – May 1, 2008) was an American executive in Major League Baseball who played a major role in the operation of three California baseball franchises from the late 1940s through the mid-1980s, most notably as the general manager of the Los Angeles Dodgers from 1958 to 1968.

He began his career with the Brooklyn Dodgers. During his tenure with the team, the Dodgers captured eight National League pennants and its first four World Series titles. He was previously a key figure in the integration of Minor League Baseball in the late 1940s while working for the Dodgers organization. He went on to become the first president of the San Diego Padres (1968–77); then, between 1977 and 1984, as general manager, he assembled the California Angels teams that made the franchise's first two postseason appearances. His sons Peter Bavasi and Bill Bavasi have also served as big league general managers.

== Early life ==
He was born Emil Joseph Bavasi in Manhattan, New York City. His sister, Iola ("Lolly"), nicknamed him Buzzie because his mother said he was "always buzzing around." Bavasi was raised in Scarsdale, New York, by Joseph and Sue Bavasi. Joseph, his immigrant father, was a newspaper distributor.

He went to high school at Fordham Preparatory School, in the Bronx, with Fred Frick, the son of Ford Frick, president of the National League.

He attended DePauw University, in Greencastle, Indiana, where he was a catcher and while at DePauw roomed with Fred Frick, after which Ford Frick recommended Bavasi for an office boy position with the Dodgers to Larry MacPhail. Bavasi graduated from DePauw in 1938.

Bavasi was hired by Dodgers general manager Larry MacPhail in 1938, for $35 a week, to become a front office assistant with the Brooklyn Dodgers, and after one year was named the business manager of the Dodgers' Class D minor league team in Americus, Georgia, where he spent three seasons. In 1941 he moved to Durham, North Carolina, Class B team of the Dodgers and married his wife, Evit.

After being drafted, he was awarded a Bronze Star Medal fighting in the Italian Campaign of World War II as a machine-gunner in the United States Army.

In late 1945, after serving 18 months, Staff Sergeant Bavasi returned to Georgia to rest with his family. While there, Dodgers president Branch Rickey telephoned and asked Bavasi to become business manager of a new minor-league baseball team in the New England League, and to find a suitable city in which to place the club.

== Integration: Nashua and "Dodgertown" ==
Although Bavasi did not know for certain, he suspected that Rickey, who had started to integrate the Dodgers' farm system with the signing of Jackie Robinson the previous October, might be planning to sign more African Americans to contracts. If that was the case, the Dodgers needed a low-level minor-league team outside the American South to which to assign these players. Ultimately, Bavasi chose Nashua, New Hampshire. With fewer than 35,000 people, Nashua would be the smallest market in the New England League, and fewer than fifty African Americans resided in the community. However, the Nashua Dodgers were assured of a predominantly French Canadian fan base, a fact which both Rickey and Bavasi believed would help in the integration of African Americans into minor league baseball. Additionally, Nashua was home to the relatively new Holman Stadium, which Bavasi was able to lease from the city.

In March 1946, Bavasi received word that Brooklyn had signed former Negro league ballplayers Roy Campanella and Don Newcombe, and that they would be sent to Nashua for the season. Bavasi spent nearly a month planning for their arrival, naming Nashua Telegraph managing editor Fred Dobens to the position of President of the Nashua Dodgers to ensure the newspaper's support for the integration project; Dobens' newspaper did not release any word of the signings until April. Dobens’ younger brother, Ray Dobens, a former pitcher for the Boston Red Sox, was named general manager. Bavasi also publicly linked the team to Clyde Sukeforth, who had scouted Campanella, Newcombe, and Jackie Robinson for Rickey and who had played minor-league baseball in Nashua in the mid-1920s. He promoted the team's French Canadian connection through his team's Quebec-born players, and even attempted to hire Frenchy Bordagaray to manage the team (eventually he settled on Walter Alston).

The 1946 season was a successful one. The Nashua Dodgers placed second in the league and won the Governor's Cup, defeating the Lynn Red Sox. In terms of attendance, Nashua also proved successful, in part because of Bavasi's imaginative promotional skills. The league saw few racially motivated incidents, with two exceptions. Campanella has claimed that Manchester Giants catcher Sal Yvars threw dirt in his face during a game at Manchester Athletic Field (Gill Stadium), but the incident was resolved on the field (though Yvars has denied that the incident took place). More seriously, players and the manager of the Lynn Red Sox hurled racial slurs and insults at Campanella and Newcombe, particularly late in the season when the two clubs were locked in a tight pennant race. On one occasion, Bavasi was so enraged by the comments of the Red Sox that he met Lynn's manager and players in the Holman Stadium parking lot and challenged them to a fight. Players restrained Bavasi and the Lynn manager, and the Lynn team boarded their bus without further incident.

As a result of their success in Nashua, Bavasi, Campanella, and Alston all were promoted to teams in higher-level leagues in 1947, and Newcombe followed in 1948.

In 1948, Bavasi became general manager of the Montreal Royals, one of the Dodgers' top two Triple-A farm teams. Around that time, as a result of continued prejudice against Brooklyn's African American ballplayers during spring training, the Dodgers sent Bavasi to find property at which to establish a permanent spring training facility. Bavasi chose a site outside Vero Beach, Florida, at which to establish Dodgertown, anchored by the newly constructed Holman Stadium. The Dodgers continued to train there virtually without interruption through 2008 before moving to a new facility in Glendale, Arizona.

== MLB executive career ==
=== Dodgers ===
During Bavasi's term in Montreal, disagreements over the operation of the parent team in Brooklyn intensified between Rickey and Walter O'Malley; at the time, Rickey and O'Malley were two of four equal partners in the Dodgers, each holding 25 percent of the club's stock. In 1950, the illness and death of another partner, pharmaceutical executive John L. Smith, coincided with the pending expiration of Rickey's contract as the Dodgers' president and general manager. With Smith and, later, his widow both siding with O'Malley, Rickey's contract was not renewed. O'Malley then acquired Rickey's stock to assume 50 percent ownership, took over as team president, and named Bavasi (then 35 years old) the Dodgers' vice president and de facto general manager on November 3, 1950. O'Malley would acquire Mary Louise Smith's 25 percent share in 1958, then become sole owner in 1975 when he bought out the heirs of Dearie Mulvey's one-quarter stake in the team. Bavasi would be given the formal title of executive vice president and general manager prior to the 1958 season.

In Bavasi's nearly 18 years as the team's top baseball operations executive, the Dodgers won eight National League pennants (1952, 1953, 1955, 1956, 1959, 1963, 1965 and 1966)—including the first four World Series titles in franchise history (1955, 1959, 1963 and 1965). Three world championships occurred after the team's move to Los Angeles in 1958, a move that Bavasi did not favor. The Dodgers also finished in a dead heat twice with the Giants, necessitating tie-breaking, best-of-three series in both 1951 and 1962. But they dropped the clinching playoff games in the ninth innings of each contest.

While the nucleus of the Brooklyn-based team was in place when Bavasi took over in 1951, he and O'Malley remained committed to the Dodgers' extensive scouting and player development system that Rickey had constructed after the war. That system contributed players such as Joe Black, Jim Gilliam, Johnny Podres and Sandy Amoros (heroes of the 1955 World Series), Roger Craig, Don Drysdale, Sandy Koufax, Charlie Neal, John Roseboro and Don Zimmer to the Dodgers before their move to California. In the late 1950s, it produced Larry Sherry, a relief pitcher who was key to the 1959 pennant and World Series title. It also began to churn out the core regulars of the Dodgers' 1960s dynasty, such as Tommy Davis, Willie Davis, Ron Fairly, Frank Howard and Maury Wills. During the mid-1960s, the Dodgers developed Jim Lefebvre, Wes Parker and Don Sutton, key contributors to their 1965–66 pennants. Bavasi also made strategic additions of veteran players who proved pivotal to pennant-winning teams, like Sal Maglie (1956), Wally Moon (1959), Bill Skowron (1963), Claude Osteen (1965–66, after he was acquired for Howard), Lou Johnson (1965–66) and Phil Regan (1966). In 1960, he acquired (in a trade for Zimmer) a minor-league left-handed relief pitcher from the Chicago Cubs, Ron Perranoski, who would anchor the Dodgers' bullpen through 1967.

Bavasi also strongly recommended Walter Alston to O'Malley as a potential Brooklyn manager after the 1953 season. Alston, then a career minor leaguer, had managed for Bavasi in Nashua (1946) and Montreal (1950). O'Malley would hire Alston and sign him to 23 consecutive one-year contracts, with Alston winning seven National League pennants and four World Series titles while forging a place in the Baseball Hall of Fame.

In the days surrounding Bavasi's June 1968 departure from the Dodgers, the club enjoyed what has been called the best amateur draft in baseball history. The regular and secondary phases of the 1968 June lottery, supervised by Fresco Thompson and Al Campanis, the team's top minor league and scouting officials who would be Bavasi's immediate successors as GM, netted Steve Garvey, Ron Cey, Bill Buckner, Bobby Valentine, Joe Ferguson, Doyle Alexander and others.

During his time with the Dodgers, Bavasi became known for his deceptive methods of negotiating contracts with players. He prided himself in giving as little salary to a player as possible. Amongst his methods was leaving a fake contract on his desk during a negotiation with a player and leaving the room for a while. The player, noticing the lesser salary his star teammate was getting compared to what they was asking, would often lower the salary he wanted.

He also played players against each other. However, in 1966, tired of being played against each other, Dodger pitchers Sandy Koufax and Don Drysdale staged a joint holdout in which they were successful in getting Bavasi to bend a little. Though Bavasi dismissed the holdout as a "gimmick", it turned out to be the first notable event in baseball's labor movement.

=== Padres ===
In June of 1968, Bavasi resigned from the Dodgers to become president and minority owner of the San Diego Padres, an expansion team set to debut in 1969. Bavasi selected Dodger third-base coach Preston Gómez as the Padres' first manager and added former Dodgers (or Dodger farmhands) Craig, Moon and Sparky Anderson as coaches for their maiden season. While the pickings in the National League expansion draft were slim, Bavasi managed to select slugger Nate Colbert and hard-hitting outfielders Ollie Brown and Cito Gaston, who provided punch to the Padre lineup during the team's early history.

The early Padres teams struggled on the field, finishing last in the National League West Division for their first six years of existence, losing over 100 games four times (and 99 games once). The team's high-water mark during Bavasi's nine-year term as club president would occur in 1976, when it won 73 games. Poor attendance forced majority owner C. Arnholt Smith to put the Padres up for sale in 1973 and almost drove them to transfer to Washington, D.C. But fast-food magnate Ray Kroc stepped in and saved the Padres for San Diego, and attendance perked up beginning in 1974, Kroc's first season as owner.

Although veteran minor league executive Eddie Leishman held the title of general manager during the team's early seasons, Bavasi was integrally involved in baseball decisions. After the 1972 season, he promoted his son Peter from farm system director to GM, and the younger Bavasi drafted future Hall of Famer Dave Winfield with the club's first-round pick in the 1973 Major League Baseball draft. Peter left the Padres after the 1976 campaign to become the first president in the history of the expansion Toronto Blue Jays, and in 1977, the Bavasis became the first father-and-son duo to serve as chief executives of two different MLB teams at the same time.

=== Angels ===
After the 1977 season, California Angels owner Gene Autry hired the elder Bavasi as executive vice president and general manager. During his seven years in the post, the Angels captured American League West Division titles in 1979 and 1982, the club's first-ever appearances in the baseball postseason. But each time the Angels failed to advance to the World Series, dropping the 1979 American League Championship Series to the Baltimore Orioles and the 1982 ALCS to the Milwaukee Brewers.

Through trades, free agency and the club's farm system, Bavasi acquired players such as Rod Carew, Reggie Jackson, Carney Lansford, Bob Boone, Fred Lynn, Mike Witt and Don Aase. But there were setbacks: the shocking death of star free agent outfielder Lyman Bostock, who was murdered late during the 1978 season in a case of mistaken identity, and the failure to retain future all-time strikeout king Nolan Ryan when he became a free agent after the 1979 campaign. Nearing age 70, Bavasi retired during the closing days of the 1984 season, when the Angels finished at the .500 mark.

=== Record as general manager ===
Team	Year	Regular season					Postseason			
Team	Year	Games	Won	Lost	Win %	Finish	Won	Lost	Win %	Result
BKN	1951	157	90	67	.573	2nd in NL	–	–	–	–
BKN	1952	154	96	57	.627	1st in NL	3	4	.429	Lost World Series (NYY)
BKN	1953	154	105	49	.682	1st in NL	2	4	.333	Lost World Series (NYY)
BKN	1954	154	92	62	.597	2nd in NL	–	–	–	–
BKN	1955	154	98	55	.641	1st in NL	4	3	.571	Won World Series (NYY)
BKN	1956	154	93	61	.604	1st in NL	3	4	.429	Lost World Series (NYY)
BKN	1957	154	84	70	.545	3rd in NL	–	–	–	–
LAD	1958	154	71	83	.461	7th in NL	–	–	–	–
LAD	1959	154	88	68	.564	1st in NL	4	2	.667	Won World Series (CHW)
LAD	1960	154	82	72	.532	3rd in NL	–	–	–	–
LAD	1961	154	89	65	.578	2nd in NL	–	–	–	–
LAD	1962	165	102	63	.618	2nd in NL	–	–	–	–
LAD	1963	162	99	63	.611	1st in NL	4	0	1.000	Won World Series (NYY)
LAD	1964	162	80	82	.494	6th in NL	–	–	–	–
LAD	1965	162	97	65	.599	1st in NL	4	3	.571	Won World Series (MIN)
LAD	1966	162	95	67	.586	1st in NL	0	4	.000	Lost World Series (BAL)
LAD	1967	162	73	89	.451	8th in NL	–	–	–	–
LAD	1968	162	76	86	.469	7th in NL	–	–	–	–
BKN/LAD total		2,834	1,610	1,224	.568		24	24	.500	
CAL	1978	162	87	75	.537	2nd in AL West	–	–	–	–
CAL	1979	162	88	74	.543	1st in AL West	1	3	.250	Lost ALCS (BAL)
CAL	1980	160	65	95	.406	6th in AL West	–	–	–	–
CAL	1981	60	31	29	.517	4th in AL West	–	–	–	–
CAL	1981	50	20	30	.400	7th in AL West	–	–	–	–
CAL	1982	162	93	69	.574	1st in AL West	2	3	.400	Lost ALCS (MIL)
CAL	1983	162	70	92	.432	5th in AL West	–	–	–	–
CAL	1984	162	81	81	.500	2nd in AL West	–	–	–	–
CAL total		1,080	535	545	.495		3	6	.333	
Total		3,914	2,145	1,769	.548		27	30	.474	

== Personal life ==
Bavasi's son Bill is the former general manager of the Seattle Mariners and California Angels; son Peter held president or general manager positions with the Padres, Blue Jays and Cleveland Indians during the 1970s and 1980s; and another son, Chris, formerly served as mayor of Flagstaff, Arizona. With his wife, Evit, they had a fourth son, Bob, the former owner of the Everett AquaSox.

Bavasi was inducted into the San Diego Padres Hall of Fame in 2001. In 2007, he was also inducted by the San Diego Hall of Champions, honoring San Diego's finest athletes both on and off the playing surface.

Actor Wally Cassell played Buzzie (Dodgers manager) in season 1, episode 29 of The Beverly Hillbillies, titled "The Clampetts & the Dodgers".

Bavasi died on May 1, 2008, in San Diego, California, near his home in La Jolla, aged 93.

Sporting positions
Preceded by Branch Rickey	Brooklyn/Los Angeles Dodgers general manager 1950–1968	Succeeded by Fresco Thompson
Preceded by Franchise established	San Diego Padres president 1968–1977	Succeeded by Ballard Smith
Preceded by Harry Dalton	California Angels general manager 1977–1984	Succeeded by Mike Port
