= Jim Fregosi =

American baseball player and manager (1942–2014)

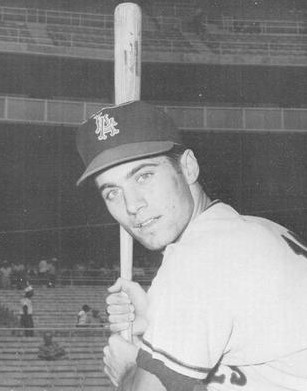
- Fregosi with the Los Angeles Angels in 1964
- Shortstop / Manager
- Born: April 4, 1942; San Francisco, California, U.S.
- Died: February 14, 2014 (aged 71); Miami, Florida, U.S.
- Batted: Right Threw: Right

MLB debut
- September 14, 1961, for the Los Angeles Angels

Last MLB appearance
- May 31, 1978, for the Pittsburgh Pirates

MLB statistics
- Batting average: .265
- Home runs: 151
- Runs batted in: 706
- Managerial record: 1,028–1,094
- Winning %: .484
- Stats at Baseball Reference
- Managerial record at Baseball Reference

Teams
- As player: Los Angeles / California Angels (1961–1971); New York Mets (1972–1973); Texas Rangers (1973–1977); Pittsburgh Pirates (1977–1978); As manager: California Angels (1978–1981); Chicago White Sox (1986–1988); Philadelphia Phillies (1991–1996); Toronto Blue Jays (1999–2000)

Career highlights and awards
- 6× All-Star (1964, 1966–1970); Gold Glove Award (1967); Los Angeles Angels No. 11 retired; Angels Hall of Fame

James Louis Fregosi (April 4, 1942 – February 14, 2014) was an American professional baseball shortstop and manager, who played in Major League Baseball (MLB) from 1961 to 1978, primarily for the Los Angeles / California Angels. He also played for the New York Mets, Texas Rangers, and Pittsburgh Pirates.

Having been the Angels’ most productive and popular player for that franchise's first eleven years of play, Fregosi quickly became its first star. He led the American League (AL) in defensive double plays twice, winning the 1967 Gold Glove Award, and, upon leaving the team, ranked ninth in AL history, with 818 double plays. Fregosi holds the franchise record with 70 career triples; several of his other team records, including career games (1,429), hits (1,408), doubles (219), runs (691), and runs batted in (546), were broken by Brian Downing over the course of the 1986 through 1989 seasons.

Fregosi returned to the team as manager, guiding it to its first-ever postseason appearance in 1979, and later managed the Philadelphia Phillies to the 1993 National League pennant.

== Early life ==
Fregosi was born on April 4, 1942, in San Francisco, California, and spent part of his youth growing up in nearby in San Mateo. He was the son of Archie and Margaret Fregosi and also spent time growing up in South San Francisco. His paternal grandparents were Italian, while his maternal grandparents were English and Irish.

A right-handed batter, Fregosi is one of many notable alumni of Junípero Serra High School in San Mateo, California, where he excelled in football, basketball, and baseball, and also ran track. Other graduates include Tom Brady, Barry Bonds, and Lynn Swann. He graduated in 1959, and was inducted to the school's inaugural Athletic Hall of Fame class in 1990.

== Professional career ==
=== Draft and minor leagues ===
Fregosi was signed as an amateur free agent by the Boston Red Sox in 1960. The Red Sox assigned him to the Alpine (Texas) Cowboys of the Sophomore League, where he played shortstop and second base, with a .267 batting average in 1960. In December of the same year, after the Red Sox chose not to protect him, he was selected by the Angels in the 1960 MLB Expansion Draft.

The Angels assigned him to the Dallas-Fort Worth Rangers of the Triple-A American Association in 1961, where he hit .254, playing solely at shortstop. He was called up by the Angels in September 1961 and played in 11 games. In 1962, he played in 64 games for Dallas-Fort Worth, his final games in the minor leagues, and joined the Angels after hitting .283 in 219 at bats.

=== Los Angeles / California Angels (1961–1971) ===
On September 14, 1961, Fregosi made his MLB debut. After hitting .291 in 175 at-bats as a reserve in 1962 and starting 49 games at shortstop, he batted .287 – ninth in the AL – in his first full season in 1963. He was second in the league in triples and fifth in hits. He made his first All-Star squad in 1964, batting .277. Fregosi was the leadoff hitter for the American League All-Star Team, and had one hit in four at bats.

From 1964 to mid-May 1969, he teamed with second baseman Bobby Knoop (Knoop was traded to the Chicago White Sox in 1969 after 27 games) to form one of the game's top double-play combinations. With Knoop winning Gold Gloves from 1966 to 1968, the two became only the third middle infield combination (after Nellie Fox and Louis Aparicio in 1959 and 1960) to win the honor in the same season (1967). On July 28, 1964, Fregosi became the first Angel to hit for the cycle when he did so against the Yankees, and he did so again on May 20, 1968, but this one was an unnatural cycle, hitting a home run in the first inning, a triple in the third inning, a double in the eighth inning, and a game-winning walk-off single in the bottom of the 11th inning.

Fregosi continued to turn out solid years, particularly in 1967, when he batted .290 (seventh in the AL) and won his only Gold Glove, finishing seventh in the MVP voting. He became regarded as the league's top-hitting shortstop, and best all-around shortstop, leading the AL in triples (13) in 1968. He was named an All-Star every season from 1966 to 1970. But he was sidelined in 1971 when a tumor was discovered in his foot, playing in only 107 games after playing between 147 and 161 games from 1963 to 1970. Fregosi's future with the Angels became uncertain when the Angels acquired Jose Cardenas on November 30, 1971, and named him their starting shortstop.

In 1969, the fans voted him the number one player in franchise history and, in 1998, the team retired his number 11. He was inducted into the Angels Hall of Fame in 1989. On August 12, 2014, in a game between the Angels and Phillies, both teams wore patches honoring Fregosi.

=== New York Mets (1972–1973) ===
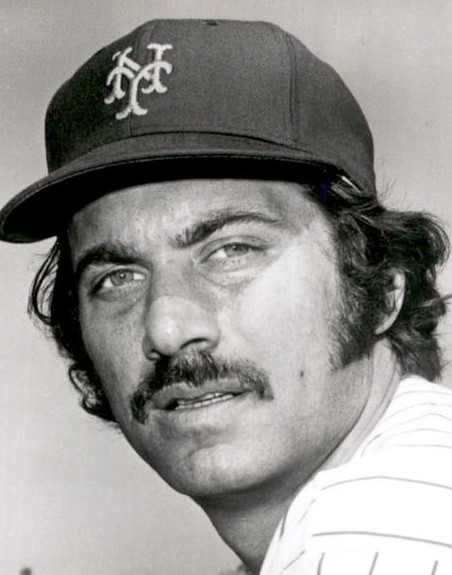
Fregosi in 1973

On December 10, 1971, Fregosi was traded to the New York Mets for four players, including future Hall of Fame pitcher Nolan Ryan, a trade that embittered many New York fans because of Ryan's future success. Fregosi took jibes over the trade with good humor, saying the blame belonged with Angels' general manager Harry Dalton, not him. (Fregosi would later manage Ryan in 1978 and 1979, Ryan's last two years as an Angel.)

Sidelined by several injuries, including a broken thumb, in 1972, Fregosi struggled with the Mets, where he played mainly at third base (85 games to only six at shortstop). He played in only 101 games, with a .232 batting average and five home runs.

=== Texas Rangers (1973–1977) ===
Fregosi was sold to the Texas Rangers in the middle of the 1973 season. He spent five years as a backup for the Rangers (1973–77), during which he played primarily as a first baseman.

=== Pittsburgh Pirates (1977–1978) ===
Fregosi was traded to the Pittsburgh Pirates in June 1977 for Ed Kirkpatrick, who had been Fregosi's Angels teammate from 1962 to 1968. When the Angels expressed interest in naming him as their manager in 1978, the Pirates released him to pursue the opportunity. He took the Angels' managerial job the day after he was released.

== Managerial career ==
=== California Angels (1978–1981) ===
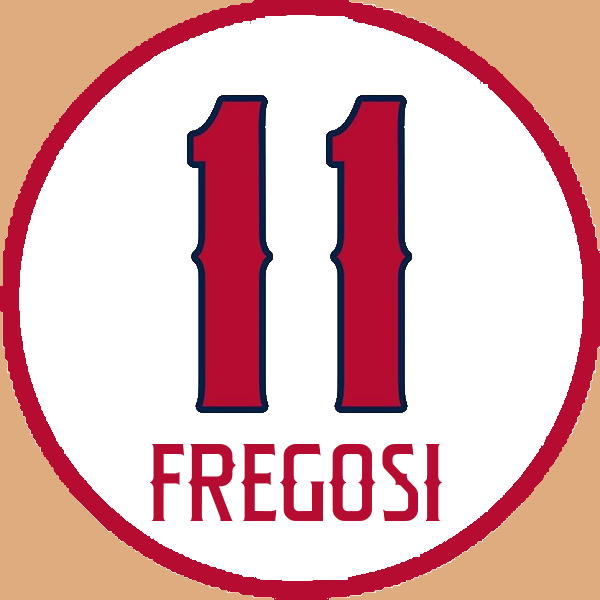
Jim Fregosi's number 11 was retired by the Anaheim Angels in 1998.

In becoming the Angels' manager at age 36, Fregosi was presented with a solid team nucleus of Ryan, Baylor, Downing, Bobby Grich, Carney Lansford, Frank Tanana, and longtime owner Gene Autry, compiling a record of 62–54 in 117 games, and tying for second with Texas behind the Kansas City Royals. In 1979, with the addition of Rod Carew, he led the Angels to an 88–74 record, surprising the Royals and winning the first title in the club's 19-year existence. But they did not have enough to get by the Baltimore Orioles in the 1979 American League Championship Series. The Angels lost Game 1 in 10 innings and dropped a 9–8 slugfest in Game 2. The Angels captured a 4–3 win in Game 3, scoring twice in the bottom of the ninth on an error and a Larry Harlow double, but were knocked out in an 8–0 Game 4 loss.

After Ryan's departure to the Houston Astros at the end of the season, the team's pitching faltered in 1980 (going from three starters with ERAs of 3.89 or lower in 1979, to no starter below 4.06 in 1980), and the club dropped back into sixth place in their division. Fregosi was replaced in the first half of the 1981 season. Fregosi's record was 237 wins and 248 losses in the regular season and one win and three losses in the postseason.

=== Louisville Redbirds ===
From the Angels, Fregosi was brought back into the game by Cardinals Farm Director Lee Thomas (Fregosi's Angels teammate 1961-64) to manage the Louisville Redbirds of the American Association for three seasons. Louisville finished first during the regular season in Fregosi's first season in 1983, and lost the league championship in the playoffs. In Fregosi's second season, Louisville tied for fourth place in the regular season but won the 1984 league championship. In 1985, Fregosi's Louisville team finished the season in first place and won the league championship in the playoffs.

=== Chicago White Sox (1986–1988) ===
With his success in Louisville, Fregosi was hired to manage the Chicago White Sox in 1986. Fregosi managed the team for three seasons, in each of which the White Sox finished in fifth place in the American League West. Fregosi was released at the end of the 1988 season. He finished with a record of 193 wins and 226 losses in the regular season. He did not manage any postseason games for the White Sox.

=== Philadelphia Phillies (1991–1996) ===
Fregosi returned in 1991 with the Phillies, hired again by former Angels teammate and General Manager Lee Thomas. His greatest triumph as a manager came in 1993, when he managed the club to the World Series. After finishing 26 games out of first place in 1992, in last place, the 1993 Phillies (featuring a cast of colorful characters, including Darren Daulton, Lenny Dykstra, Dave Hollins, John Kruk, Danny Jackson, Curt Schilling, and Mitch Williams) charged to 97 wins. The Phillies then further shocked the baseball world by pulling off a major upset against the two-time defending NL Champion Atlanta Braves in six games in the League Championship Series. Despite putting up a good fight against the defending World Champion Toronto Blue Jays in the World Series, Fregosi's Phillies wound up losing to Toronto in six games, with Joe Carter's Series-winning home run in Game 6 being the final blow. Fregosi's fit as a manager for this unusual group of players was important in their unexpected success.

Despite the World Series run, Fregosi was often the target of criticism by the Philadelphia sports media. One general criticism of Fregosi was that he was a manager who relied on veteran players and was unable to develop younger players. He ultimately was fired by the Phillies in 1996 after posting a series of dismal post-1993 seasons. Fregosi finished with a record of 431 wins and 463 losses in the regular season and six wins and six losses in the postseason.

=== Toronto Blue Jays (1999–2000) ===
After leaving the Phillies, Fregosi was a scout and became a special assistant to San Francisco Giants' general manager Brian Sabean for two years. He was hired away from the Giants to become manager of the Blue Jays in 1999, one month before the season began. He replaced Tim Johnson, who was fired after one year due to lying about his military service in Vietnam and play in college football.

The team finished in third place and above .500 in each of Fregosi's two seasons in Toronto. On July 27, 2000, he won his 1,000th game as manager, doing so against the Seattle Mariners 7–2. Despite fair results, he was let go after the season. Fregosi finished with a record of 167 wins and 157 losses in the regular season. This ended up being his final managerial position in Major League Baseball. His run with the Blue Jays was the only stint where he finished with an overall winning record.

=== Career ===
As a manager, he had a record of 1028 wins and 1094 losses in 15 seasons. He also managed 16 post-season games, finishing with a record of seven wins and nine losses. At the end of 2004, when the Phillies were looking for a manager to replace Larry Bowa, Fregosi surfaced as a candidate for the job. The job ended up going to Charlie Manuel.

== Scout and executive ==
At the time of his death, Fregosi had been the top advance scout for the Atlanta Braves for 13 years. He had joined the Braves after leaving Toronto, and worked as a special assistant to Atlanta Braves general managers John Schuerholz and then Frank Wren, and was the number one confidant to each of them.

== Legacy and honors ==
In his 18-year career, Fregosi batted .265 with 1,726 hits, 151 home runs, 844 runs, 706 runs batted in (RBIs), 264 doubles, 78 triples, and 76 stolen bases in 1,902 games played. Brian Downing broke his club marks for career at bats (5,244), total bases (2,112) and extra base hits (404). As of 2024, Fregosi ranks sixth, sixth, and seventh, respectively, in those categories for the Angels. Don Baylor broke his team record of 115 home runs in 1981 at a time when Fregosi was Baylor's manager. As of 2024, neither is in the all-time top 10 home run leaders for the Angels.

Fregosi was the last player to retire who was a member of the "original" Los Angeles Angels.

National Sportscasters and Sportwriters Hall of Fame inductee Frank Deford said of Fregosi in 1964: "If Jim Fregosi played for the Los Angeles Dodgers instead of the Los Angeles Angels, the city would cast his footprint or his gloveprint or something in cement outside of Grauman's Chinese Theatre. He ... would be endorsing everything under the smog. For Jim Fregosi, just 22 years old, is generally acknowledged as the best young player in the American League."

Fregosi's number 11 was retired by the Angels in 1998.

For his scouting work, in 2011, Fregosi received the George Genovese Lifetime Achievement Award, from the Professional Baseball Scouts Foundation.

=== Managerial record ===
| Team | Year | Regular season | | | | | Postseason | | | |
| Team | Year | Games | Won | Lost | Win % | Finish | Won | Lost | Win % | Result |
|---|---|---|---|---|---|---|---|---|---|---|
| CAL | 1978 | 116 | 62 | 54 | .534 | 2nd in AL West | – | – | – | – |
| CAL | 1979 | 162 | 88 | 74 | .543 | 1st in AL West | 1 | 3 | .250 | Lost ALCS (BAL) |
| CAL | 1980 | 160 | 65 | 95 | .406 | 6th in AL West | – | – | – | – |
| CAL | 1981 | 47 | 22 | 25 | .468 | fired | – | – | – | – |
| CAL total | | 485 | 237 | 248 | .489 | | 1 | 3 | .250 | |
| CWS | 1986 | 96 | 45 | 51 | .469 | 5th in AL West | – | – | – | – |
| CWS | 1987 | 162 | 77 | 85 | .475 | 5th in AL West | – | – | – | – |
| CWS | 1988 | 161 | 71 | 90 | .441 | 5th in AL West | – | – | – | – |
| CWS total | | 419 | 193 | 226 | .461 | | 0 | 0 | – | |
| PHI | 1991 | 149 | 74 | 75 | .497 | 3rd in NL East | – | – | – | – |
| PHI | 1992 | 162 | 70 | 92 | .432 | 6th in NL East | – | – | – | – |
| PHI | 1993 | 162 | 97 | 65 | .599 | 1st in NL East | 6 | 6 | .500 | Lost World Series (TOR) |
| PHI | 1994 | 115 | 54 | 61 | .470 | 4th in NL East | – | – | – | – |
| PHI | 1995 | 144 | 69 | 75 | .479 | 3rd in NL East | – | – | – | – |
| PHI | 1996 | 162 | 67 | 95 | .414 | 5th in NL East | – | – | – | – |
| PHI total | | 894 | 431 | 463 | .482 | | 6 | 6 | .500 | |
| TOR | 1999 | 162 | 84 | 78 | .519 | 3rd in AL East | – | – | – | – |
| TOR | 2000 | 162 | 83 | 79 | .512 | 3rd in AL East | – | – | – | – |
| TOR total | | 324 | 167 | 157 | .515 | | 0 | 0 | – | |
| Total | | 2122 | 1028 | 1094 | .484 | | 7 | 9 | .438 | |

== Personal life ==
Fregosi was known for not wanting to discuss his personal life in the baseball context. He always joked that had he written any autobiography, it would've been titled "The Bases Were Loaded And So Was I."

Fregosi joined the Benevolent and Protective Order of Elks in 1982 at the Garden Grove Elks #1952

Fregosi delivered a eulogy at the March 2007 funeral of longtime friend and former Phillies coach John Vukovich.

=== Death ===
On February 8, 2014, Fregosi suffered a series of strokes on an MLB alumni cruise. The cruise docked in the Cayman Islands where he was rushed to a local hospital, and his condition was stabilized by doctors before he was relocated to Miami. On February 13, Fregosi's condition declined and he died early on February 14, at the age of 71. Phillies owner David Montgomery memorialized Fregosi as a "dear friend".

Shortly after his death, on March 5, 2014, the Braves and Phillies held a 12-minute ceremony honoring Fregosi before their preseason game.

== See also ==
- List of Gold Glove middle infield duos
- List of Major League Baseball annual triples leaders
- List of Major League Baseball managers with most career wins
- List of Major League Baseball players to hit for the cycle

Achievements
| Preceded by Willie Stargell; Randy Hundley | Hitting for the cycle July 28, 1964; May 20, 1968 | Succeeded by Carl Yastrzemski; Wes Parker |
Sporting positions
| Preceded by Joe Frazier | Louisville Redbirds Manager; 1983–1986 | Succeeded by Dyar Miller |
