= Ralph Botting =

American baseball player (born 1955)

- Pitcher
- Born: May 12, 1955 (age 70); Houlton, Maine, U.S.
- Batted: Left Threw: Left

MLB debut
- June 28, 1979, for the California Angels

Last MLB appearance
- October 5, 1980, for the California Angels

MLB statistics
- Win–loss record: 2–3
- Earned run average: 7.39
- Innings pitched: 56
- Stats at Baseball Reference

Teams
- California Angels (1979–1980)

Ralph Wayne Botting (born May 12, 1955) is an American former professional baseball player, a left-handed pitcher who worked in 18 games in Major League Baseball for the California Angels during the 1979–1980 seasons. He stood 6 feet (1.8 m) tall and weighed 195 pounds (88 kg).

Although he was born in Houlton, Maine, on the Canada–US border, he attended high school in Burbank, California, earning all-CIF honors as a junior and a pitcher of the year honor as a senior, and was selected by the Angels in the seventh round of the 1974 Major League Baseball draft. He then spent 5 1/2 years in the club's farm system before his recall during the middle of the 1979 campaign.

Botting made his Major League debut in relief on June 28, 1979, against the Texas Rangers at Arlington Stadium. Angels starting pitcher Jim Barr came out of the game with one out in the top of the first inning, with runners on second and third, and already behind 3–0. Botting "threw gasoline on the fire," and when the inning ended it was 8–0, Texas. He then pitched to four batters in the top of the second and retired no one, though there was an error committed by Angels shortstop Jim Anderson. In two-thirds of an inning, Botting allowed not only the two inherited runners to score, but gave up seven runs (six earned) of his own.

On July 26, Botting pitched 5 1/3 innings of relief at Yankee Stadium to earn his first Major League win. Nolan Ryan had come out of the game after pitching one scoreless inning because he heard popping in his elbow. In relief, Botting allowed three hits, three walks, and one run, striking out six. The Angels won, 9–5.

Botting's second and last win came on August 6, 1979, in a road game against the Oakland Athletics. He was the starting pitcher and allowed one run in 7 2/3 innings as the Angels beat the A's by a score of 5–2.

In 1980, again splitting time between the Triple-A Salt Lake City Gulls of the Pacific Coast League and the Angels, he made six starts for California, going 0–3 with a 5.81 ERA.

Botting's career totals for 18 games pitched included a 2–3 record, seven games started, and five games finished. He struck out 34, walked 28, and allowed 86 hits and 46 earned runs in 56 innings pitched. His ERA was 7.39, and his WHIP was 2.036.

Botting left pro baseball after the 1981 season, which he spent in the Kansas City Royals' organization.
