= Alfredo Martínez (baseball) =

American baseball player (born 1957)

- Pitcher
- Born: March 15, 1957 (age 68); Los Angeles, California, U.S.
- Batted: Right Threw: Right

MLB debut
- April 20, 1980, for the California Angels

Last MLB appearance
- June 7, 1981, for the California Angels

MLB statistics
- Win–loss record: 7–9
- Earned run average: 4.46
- Strikeouts: 61
- Stats at Baseball Reference

Teams
- California Angels (1980–1981)

Alfredo “Freddie” Martínez (born March 15, 1957) is a former professional baseball player who played two seasons for the California Angels of Major League Baseball. He lives in Lincoln Heights, California
