= Steve Eddy =

American baseball player (born 1957)

- Pitcher
- Born: August 21, 1957 (age 68); Sterling, Illinois, U.S.
- Batted: Right Threw: Right

MLB debut
- June 13, 1979, for the California Angels

Last MLB appearance
- August 5, 1979, for the California Angels

MLB statistics
- Win–loss record: 1-1
- Earned run average: 4.73
- Strikeouts: 7
- Stats at Baseball Reference

Teams
- California Angels (1979)

Steven Allen Eddy (born August 21, 1957) is an American former professional baseball pitcher who played in one season for the California Angels of Major League Baseball.
