= Dave Schuler =

American baseball player (born 1953)

- Pitcher
- Born: October 4, 1953 (age 72); Framingham, Massachusetts, U.S.
- Batted: Right Threw: Left

MLB debut
- September 17, 1979, for the California Angels

Last MLB appearance
- October 2, 1985, for the Atlanta Braves

MLB statistics
- Games pitched: 18
- Win–loss record: 0–1
- Earned run average: 6.75
- Innings pitched: 25
- Stats at Baseball Reference

Teams
- California Angels (1979–1980); Atlanta Braves (1985)

David Paul Schuler (born October 4, 1953) is an American former professional baseball pitcher. A left-handed reliever, Schuler appeared in 10 games in Major League Baseball (MLB) over 3 season from 1979 to 1985 with the California Angels and Atlanta Braves. He also served a pitching coach in the minor league systems of five teams.

== Amateur career ==
Schuler attended the University of New Haven, where he graduated from with a degree in general business management in 1975. He was elected into Hall of Fame in 1975, and Who's Who in American Colleges and Universities, earning a Gold Medal in 1973. In 1972 and 1973, he played collegiate summer baseball in the Cape Cod Baseball League for the Yarmouth Red Sox, and was winning pitcher of the league's All-Star Game at Yankee Stadium in 1973.

== Professional career ==
He was selected in the 10th round of the 1975 Major League Baseball draft. He was traded along with Dave LaRoche from the Cleveland Indians to the California Angels for Sid Monge, Bruce Bochte and cash on May 11, 1977. Schuler made his MLB debut with the Angels on September 17, 1979 against the Kansas City Royals. The first batter he faced was future Hall of Fame hitter George Brett. He threw 1.2 innings, giving up 2 earned runs. He also gave up a home run to Darrell Porter. This was his only game he played with the Angels in 1979.

In 1980, Schuler appeared in 4 games for the Angels as a reliever. In 12.2 innings, he gave up 5 earned runs while striking out 7.

Schuler did not appear in an MLB game in a game from 1981 to 1984. In 1985, he appeared in 9 games as a reliever for the Atlanta Braves, giving up 8 earned runs while striking out 10.

== Coaching career ==
After playing professionally, Schuler became a pitching coach in the farm systems of the New York Yankees, Baltimore Orioles, Seattle Mariners, San Francisco Giants, Colorado Rockies, Atlanta Braves and in the Taiwan Major Leagues.
