= Bob Ferris =

American baseball player (born 1955)

- Pitcher
- Born: May 7, 1955; Arlington, Virginia, U.S.
- Batted: Right Threw: Right

MLB debut
- September 12, 1979, for the California Angels

Last MLB appearance
- September 30, 1980, for the California Angels

MLB statistics
- Win–loss record: 0–2
- Earned run average: 4.64
- Strikeouts: 6
- Stats at Baseball Reference

Teams
- California Angels (1979–1980)

Robert Eugene Ferris (born May 7, 1955) is an American former Major League Baseball pitcher. The 6'6", 225-lb. right-hander was drafted by the California Angels in the 2nd round of the 1976 amateur draft, and he played for the Angels in 1979 and 1980.

Ferris was called up to the Angels after a 14–7 season with the Salt Lake City Gulls of the Pacific Coast League, and made his major league debut in relief on September 12, 1979, at Comiskey Park. He pitched one inning against the Chicago White Sox (top of the 8th) and gave up one earned run, a home run to Thad Bosley. Ferris struck out Jim Morrison to end the inning.

His finest major league effort came on September 26, 1979, against the Kansas City Royals at Anaheim Stadium. He pitched five innings in relief and gave up just one run, and it was unearned. In his two big league games in 1979 he had an earned run average of 1.50.

In 1980, he appeared in five more games for California, including three starts, and was not as successful. He allowed 32 baserunners (23 hits and 9 walks) in just 15.1 innings, and gave up 10 earned runs. He was 0–2 with a 5.87 ERA.

Career totals for 7 games pitched include a 0–2 record, 3 games started, and 1 game finished. He allowed 11 earned runs in 21.3 innings pitched, giving him a lifetime ERA of 4.64.

== Trivia ==
- Held All-Stars Darrell Porter, Frank White, and Willie Wilson to a .091 collective batting average (2-for-22)
