= Jim Anderson (baseball) =

American baseball player (born 1957)

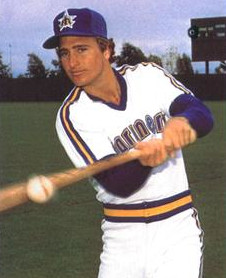
- Anderson in 1981
- Shortstop
- Born: February 23, 1957 (age 69); Los Angeles, California, U.S.
- Batted: Right Threw: Right

MLB debut
- July 2, 1978, for the California Angels

Last MLB appearance
- September 26, 1984, for the Texas Rangers

MLB statistics
- Batting average: .218
- Home runs: 13
- Runs batted in: 86
- Stats at Baseball Reference

Teams
- California Angels (1978–1979); Seattle Mariners (1980–1981); Texas Rangers (1983–1984)

James Lea Anderson (born February 23, 1957) is an American former infielder in Major League Baseball, playing mainly as a shortstop for three different teams in parts of six seasons spanning 1978–1984. Listed at 6'0", 170 lb. he batted and threw right handed.

Anderson was selected by the California Angels in the second round of the 1975 MLB draft. He debuted with the Angels in 1978, playing for them two years before joining the Seattle Mariners (1980–1981) and the Texas Rangers (1983–1984).

Anderson made his first major league appearance on July 2, 1978 at Anaheim Stadium, and he went 1-for-3 with a walk against Rangers pitchers Dock Ellis and Steve Comer, as the Angels won 4-3.

His most productive season came with the Mariners in 1980, when he posted career-highs in games played (116), starts (84), plate appearances (345), hits (72), home runs (8), RBI (30), and runs (46).

Anderson's career totals include 419 games played, a .218 batting average (211-for-970), 13 home runs, 86 RBI, 107 runs scored, and an on-base percentage of .280. A true utility man, he also made appearances at third base, second base, catcher and the corner outfield.

In between, Anderson played winter ball with the Leones del Caracas, Navegantes del Magallanes and Tiburones de La Guaira clubs of the Venezuelan League during the 1978–1983 seasons.

== Achievements ==
- Anderson led Texas League shortstops with 93 double plays while playing for the El Paso Diablos in 1977.
- His first major league home run came off Rangers All-Star pitcher Jon Matlack at Arlington Stadium (June 26, 1979)
- Had a pair of four-hit games (three doubles and a single) against the Kansas City Royals (July 1, 1979), and four singles vs. the Oakland Athletics (July 2, 1983)
- Collected 10 three-hit games, the most impressive being a double and two singles, good for five RBI and two runs scored against the Milwaukee Brewers (May 6, 1981)
- Hit a combined average of .338 (24-for-71) against All-Stars pitchers Bert Blyleven, Ron Guidry, Rick Honeycutt, Dave LaRoche, Jon Matlack, Bob Stanley, Dave Stieb, and Steve Stone
- Hit a combined .286 (6-for-21) against Hall of Famers Ferguson Jenkins and Gaylord Perry
