= Bobby Clark (outfielder) =

American baseball player (born 1955)

- Outfielder
- Born: June 13, 1955 (age 70); Sacramento, California, U.S.
- Batted: Right Threw: Right

MLB debut
- August 21, 1979, for the California Angels

Last MLB appearance
- August 4, 1985, for the Milwaukee Brewers

MLB statistics
- Batting average: .239
- Home runs: 19
- Runs batted in: 100
- Stats at Baseball Reference

Teams
- California Angels (1979–1983); Milwaukee Brewers (1984–1985)

Robert Cale Clark (born June 13, 1955) is an American former professional baseball player who played seven seasons for the California Angels and Milwaukee Brewers of Major League Baseball (MLB).

== Career ==
Clark attended the University of California, Riverside, where he played college baseball for the Highlanders in 1974.
