= List of Major League Baseball career games finished leaders =

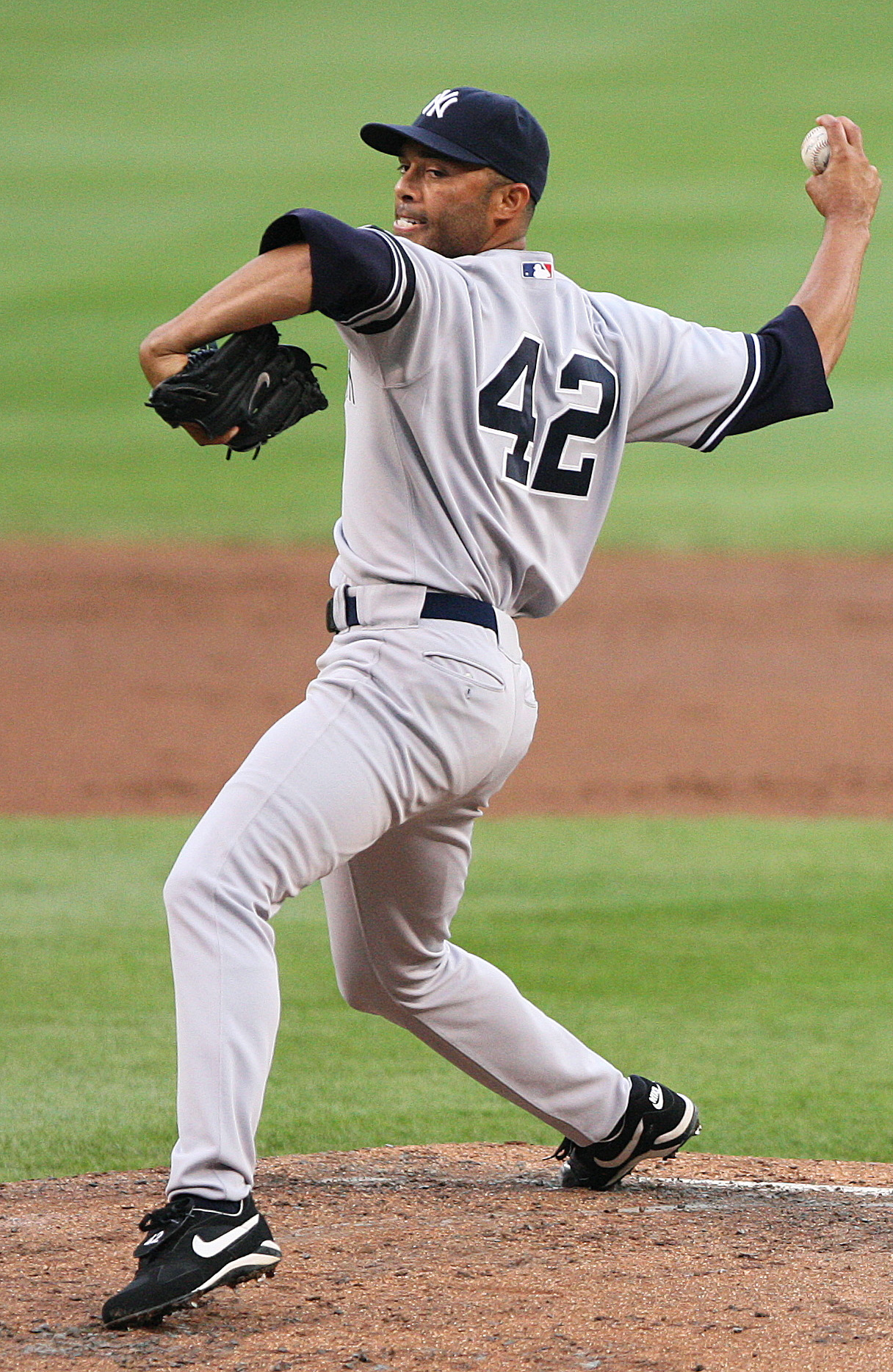
Mariano Rivera, the all-time leader in games finished

In baseball statistics, a relief pitcher is credited with a game finished (denoted by GF) if he is the last pitcher to pitch for his team in a game. A starting pitcher is not credited with a GF for pitching a complete game.

Mariano Rivera is the all-time leader in games finished with 952. Rivera is the only pitcher in MLB history to finish more than 900 career games. Trevor Hoffman and Lee Smith are the only other pitchers to finish more than 800 games in their careers.

Mike Marshall set the single-season record for games finished with 84 in 1979, surpassing his previous record of 83 established in 1974.

== Key ==
**Rank**	Rank amongst leaders in career games finished. A blank field indicates a tie.
**Player**	Name of the player
**GF**	Total career games finished
*	Denotes elected to National Baseball Hall of Fame
**Bold**	Denotes an active player (Note: A player is considered inactive if he has announced his retirement or has not played for a full season.)

== List ==
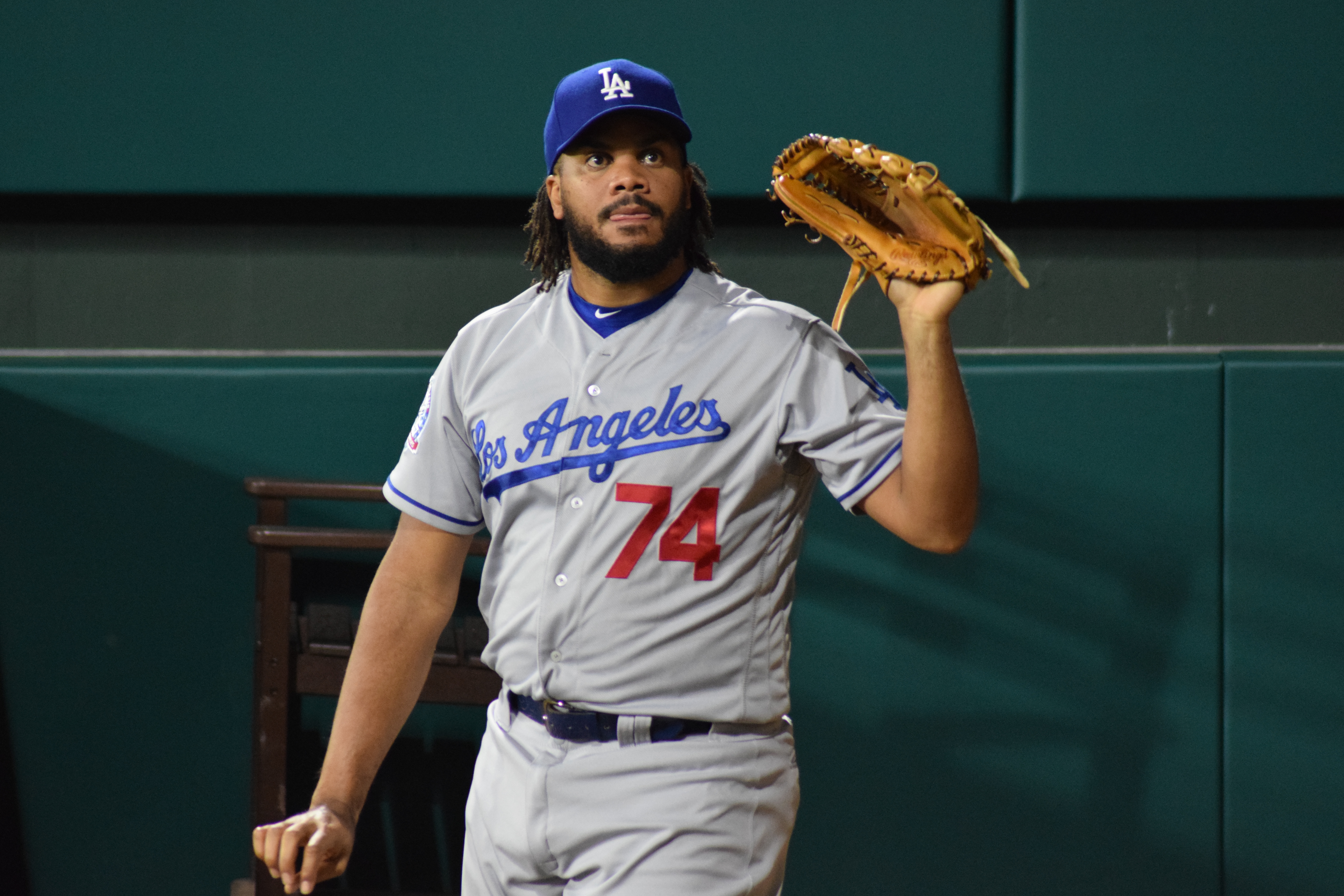
Kenley Jansen, the active leader in games finished and 5th all-time.

- Stats updated as of September 26, 2026.

Rank	Player	GF
1	Mariano Rivera*	952
2	Trevor Hoffman*	856
3	Lee Smith*	802
4	John Franco	774
5	**Kenley Jansen (39)**	739
6	Rollie Fingers*	709
7	Billy Wagner*	703
8	Jeff Reardon	695
9	Goose Gossage*	681
10	Francisco Rodríguez	677
11	**Craig Kimbrel (18)**	674
12	Roberto Hernández	667
13	Hoyt Wilhelm*	651
14	Doug Jones	640
15	Kent Tekulve	638
16	Sparky Lyle	634
17	José Mesa	633
18	Todd Jones	619
19	Gene Garber	609
20	**Aroldis Chapman (44)**	607
21	Fernando Rodney	590
22	Joe Nathan	587
23	Jonathan Papelbon	585
24	Dennis Eckersley*	577
	Lindy McDaniel	577
26	Francisco Cordero	575
27	Roy Face	574
28	Rick Aguilera	557
29	Dan Quisenberry	553
30	Mike Marshall	549
	Jeff Montgomery	549
	Robb Nen	549
33	Tom Henke	548
	Randy Myers	548
35	Troy Percival	546
36	Tug McGraw	541
37	Armando Benítez	527
38	Huston Street	525
39	John Wetteland	523
40	José Valverde	520
41	Rod Beck	519
42	Bruce Sutter*	512
43	Bob Wickman	511
44	**Raisel Iglesias (49)**	508
45	Don McMahon	505
46	Jesse Orosco	501
47	Jason Isringhausen	499
48	Dave Righetti	474
49	Mike Timlin	467
50	Ron Perranoski	458

Rank	Player	GF
51	Todd Worrell	456
52	Bill Campbell	455
53	Mark Melancon	454
54	Gregg Olson	447
55	Steve Bedrosian	439
56	Mike Henneman	432
	Dave Smith	432
58	Roger McDowell	430
59	Joakim Soria	427
60	Mike Jackson	422
	Dan Plesac	422
62	Willie Hernández	419
	Mitch Williams	419
64	Darold Knowles	417
65	Ted Abernathy	416
66	Greg Minton	415
67	**Edwin Díaz (14)**	409
68	Ugueth Urbina	408
69	Keith Foulke	406
	Stu Miller	406
71	Eddie Guardado	401
72	Gary Lavelle	399
73	Jeff Shaw	384
74	Kevin Gregg	382
75	Brian Fuentes	381
	Dave LaRoche	381
77	Dave Giusti	380
78	Jeff Brantley	379
79	Bob Stanley	377
80	Clay Carroll	373
	LaTroy Hawkins	373
82	Tom Burgmeier	370
83	Brad Lidge	368
84	John Hiller	363
	Mike Stanton	363
86	Danny Graves	360
	Jay Howell	360
88	**Josh Hader (37)**	358
	David Robertson	358
90	J. J. Putz	357
91	Bobby Thigpen	356
92	Greg Holland	355
93	Jim Brewer	351
94	Tom Gordon	347
95	Eddie Fisher	344
96	Rafael Soriano	343
97	Frank Linzy	342
98	Ron Davis	340
	Jeff Russell	340
100	Ron Kline	338

== See also ==
- Games pitched
- Games started
