= Dickie Thon =

Puerto Rican baseball player (born 1958)

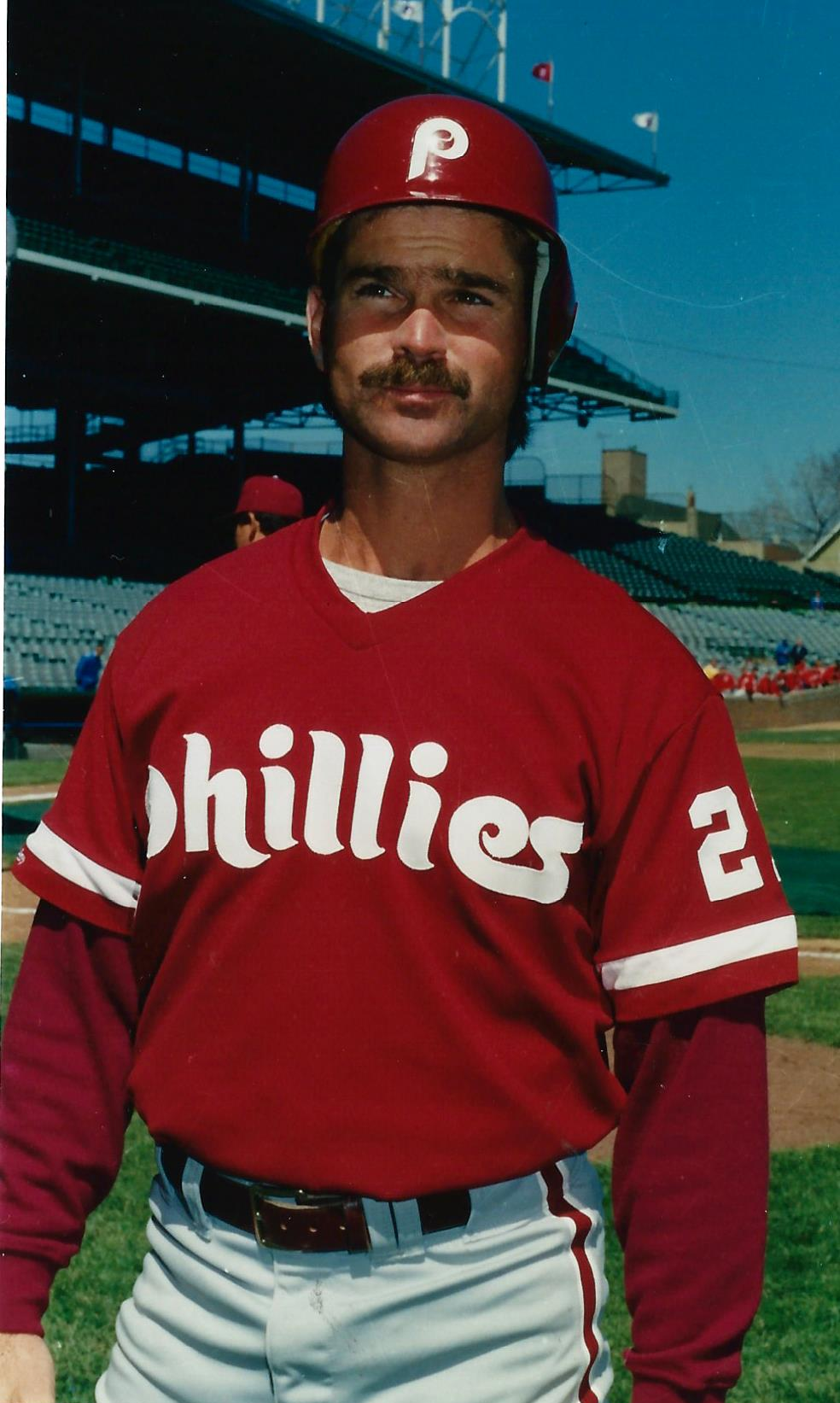
- Shortstop
- Born: June 20, 1958 (age 68); South Bend, Indiana, U.S.
- Batted: Right Threw: Right

MLB debut
- May 22, 1979, for the California Angels

Last MLB appearance
- October 3, 1993, for the Milwaukee Brewers

MLB statistics
- Batting average: .264
- Home runs: 71
- Runs batted in: 435
- Stats at Baseball Reference

Teams
- California Angels (1979–1980); Houston Astros (1981–1987); San Diego Padres (1988); Philadelphia Phillies (1989–1991); Texas Rangers (1992); Milwaukee Brewers (1993)

Career highlights and awards
- All-Star (1983); Silver Slugger Award (1983)

Member of the Caribbean

Baseball Hall of Fame
- Induction: 2008

Richard William Thon (born June 20, 1958) is a Puerto Rican-American former professional baseball player and coach. He played in Major League Baseball (MLB) as a shortstop, most prominently as a member of the Houston Astros where he first established himself as an All-Star player in 1983. Thon's promising career was severely impacted in 1984 when he was struck by a baseball in his left eye. After a lengthy recovery period, he tenaciously resumed his baseball career and played for another 10 years, but he had to contend with headaches and blurred vision and was never able to recapture the form that had made him an All-Star player. He also played for the California Angels, San Diego Padres, Philadelphia Phillies, Texas Rangers, and Milwaukee Brewers, during the course of his 15-year Major League career. After his playing career, Thon served as a minor league instructor for the Houston Astros.

== Early life ==
Thon was born on June 20, 1958, in South Bend, Indiana, where his father, a native Puerto Rican, was completing his undergraduate degree in business at the University of Notre Dame. Thon's family moved back to Puerto Rico, and he grew up in the Rio Piedras section of San Juan. As a young child, he idolized Puerto Rican baseball stars Orlando Cepeda and Roberto Clemente.

Thon was a third-generation baseball player. His grandfather, Fred Thon Sr., pitched for the Senadores de San Juan of the Puerto Rican Professional Baseball League. His father Freddie Thon Jr., who signed a major-league contract but injured his arm before reporting to training, played semi-pro baseball while finishing college at Notre Dame, and coached all of his sons throughout their Little League and teenage years. Dickie's brother, Frankie Thon, was also affiliated with major league baseball in both the U.S. and Puerto Rico having been a player, a manager and a current major-league scout, as well as the general manager of the Criollos de Caguas in the Puerto Rican League. As a teenager, Thon played for the Vaqueros de Bayamón in the Puerto Rico Winter League.

== Professional career ==
1981 photocard of Thon for Houston Astros

Thon was signed by the California Angels as an amateur free agent on November 23, 1975, while he was still in high school. Thon became one of the top prospects in the Angels' minor league organization. After starting the 1979 season with the Salt Lake City Gulls of the Pacific Coast League, he was called up and made his major-league debut on May 22, 1979, at the age of 20. Thon helped the Angels win the 1979 American League Western Division title.

In the 1979 American League Championship Series against the Baltimore Orioles, Thon pinch-ran and scored in Game Two in his only appearance in the series, as Baltimore won the series three games to one. One of his teammates on the Angels that year was future Baseball Hall of Fame member, Rod Carew, who would become one of the most influential players in Thon's career.

With the Angels' roster containing veteran players such as Bobby Grich, Bert Campaneris, Rick Burleson, and Freddie Patek, they made the decision to trade Thon to the Houston Astros for pitcher Ken Forsch on April 1, 1981. He led the National League in triples in 1982 and was selected to the 1983 All-Star Game.

== Potential and beaning ==
By 1984, Thon was drawing excitement about his potential. "He's already the best shortstop in the league," said Craig Reynolds, whom Thon had replaced as the Astro shortstop. Al Rosen, Thon's general manager, said, "when I see Dickie Thon, I see a future Hall of Famer." His career was permanently altered on April 8, 1984, when he was hit in the face by Mike Torrez's fastball. Bill James thinks Thon might have been a Hall of Famer had the injury not occurred. The pitch broke the orbital bone around his left eye and ended his 1984 season. He returned in 1985, but had problems with depth perception that permanently hampered his potential. In 1991, Thon received the Tony Conigliaro Award in recognition of his recovery from this severe injury.

In 2013, Thon said, "I couldn't see the ball very well after I got hit in my left eye. I had to make adjustments, and open up a little bit and see the ball better. It's tough to do that in the big leagues, but I did manage to play 10 [more] years." He viewed the injury as just one bad moment in a life filled mostly with blessings: "I've had a lot of good things happen to me. I try to think about it that way."

== Personal life ==
On December 15, 2025, Thon donated a kidney to his son, Dickie Joe Thon, who is known as "Joe". Joe was selected by the Toronto Blue Jays in the fifth round (156th overall) in the 2010 MLB draft and played the 2016 season for the Dunedin Blue Jays. Thon joined the Astros coaching staff in 2021, and in 2022, the junior Thon was named manager for the Fayetteville Woodpeckers, the Low-A club for the Astros. For the 2025 season, Joe will be on the coaching staff of the Los Angeles Dodgers triple-A Oklahoma City Comets team.

Thon was inducted into the Hispanic Heritage Baseball Museum Hall of Fame on September 13, 2003.

As of 2013, Thon owned a Puerto Rican Winter League team in Santurce. He is a devout Catholic.

== See also ==
- Houston Astros award winners and league leaders
- List of Major League Baseball annual triples leaders
- List of Major League Baseball players from Puerto Rico
- List of Puerto Ricans
- List of second-generation Major League Baseball players#Third-generation families
