= Don Baylor =

American baseball player and manager (1949–2017)

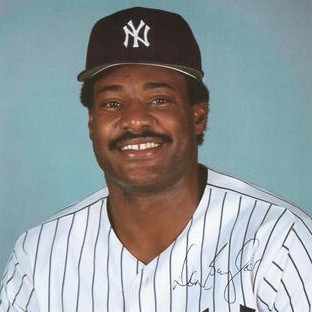
- Baylor in 1984
- Designated hitter / Left fielder / Manager
- Born: June 28, 1949; Austin, Texas, U.S.
- Died: August 7, 2017 (aged 68); Austin, Texas, U.S.
- Batted: Right Threw: Right

MLB debut
- September 18, 1970, for the Baltimore Orioles

Last MLB appearance
- October 1, 1988, for the Oakland Athletics

MLB statistics
- Batting average: .260
- Hits: 2,135
- Home runs: 338
- Runs batted in: 1,276
- Managerial record: 627–689–1
- Winning %: .476
- Stats at Baseball Reference
- Managerial record at Baseball Reference

Teams
- As player: Baltimore Orioles (1970–1975); Oakland Athletics (1976); California Angels (1977–1982); New York Yankees (1983–1985); Boston Red Sox (1986–1987); Minnesota Twins (1987); Oakland Athletics (1988); As manager: Colorado Rockies (1993–1998); Chicago Cubs (2000–2002); As coach: Milwaukee Brewers (1990–1991); St. Louis Cardinals (1992); Atlanta Braves (1999); New York Mets (2003–2004); Seattle Mariners (2005); Colorado Rockies (2009–2010); Arizona Diamondbacks (2011–2013); Los Angeles Angels of Anaheim (2014–2015)

Career highlights and awards
- All-Star (1979); World Series champion (1987); AL MVP (1979); 3× Silver Slugger Award (1983, 1985, 1986); Roberto Clemente Award (1985); AL RBI leader (1979); NL Manager of the Year (1995); Angels Hall of Fame

Don Edward Baylor (June 28, 1949 – August 7, 2017), nicknamed "Groove," was an American professional baseball player, coach and manager. During his 19 seasons in Major League Baseball (MLB), Baylor was a power hitter known for standing very close to home plate ("crowding the plate") and was a first baseman, left fielder, and designated hitter. He played for six different American League (AL) teams, primarily the Baltimore Orioles and California Angels, but he also played for the Oakland Athletics, New York Yankees, Minnesota Twins, and Boston Red Sox. In 1979, Baylor was an All-Star and won the AL Most Valuable Player Award. He won three Silver Slugger Awards, the Roberto Clemente Award, and was a member of the 1987 World Series champion Minnesota Twins.

After his playing career, Baylor managed the expansion Colorado Rockies for six years and the Chicago Cubs for three seasons. He was named NL Manager of the Year in 1995, and was inducted into the Angels Hall of Fame.

Baylor reached the World Series three times in his career, in consecutive years with three different teams. Baylor played in the World Series with the Red Sox in 1986, the Twins in 1987, and the A's in 1988, and he was on the winning side in 1987. Baylor is one of three players in history to accomplish this feat, along with Eric Hinske and Will Smith. He set the Red Sox team record for most hit by pitches in a season (35 in 1986); in his career, he was hit by pitches 267 times, fourth-most all time. Baylor retired with 285 stolen bases, 2,135 hits, and 338 home runs.

== Early life ==
Born in Austin, Texas, on June 28, 1949, Baylor grew up in Clarksville. He graduated from Stephen F. Austin High School. After being one of three African Americans to integrate Texas public schools when he was in junior high school, Baylor starred in baseball and football at Austin High, where he was the first African American to play athletics at that school. Baylor was offered a scholarship to play college football for the Texas Longhorns of the University of Texas, which would have made him the first African American to play football at Texas. He opted to pursue a baseball career, enrolling at Blinn College in Brenham, Texas.

== Professional career ==
=== Baltimore Orioles ===
The Baltimore Orioles selected Baylor in the second round of the 1967 MLB draft. He received a $7,500 signing bonus from the team. In 1970, Baylor led the Triple-A level of the minor leagues with 34 doubles, 15 triples, 127 runs, and 140 games-played while playing for the Rochester Red Wings. The following year, he again led the Triple-A level in doubles with 31. Baylor was called up to the major leagues by the Orioles on September 18, 1970. He debuted at home against Cleveland, accruing two hits and three runs batted in across five plate appearances, including a walk-off RBI single in the 11th inning. Baylor only played a total of 9 games with the Orioles in the 1970 and 1971 seasons and did not see consistent involvement with the major league roster until 1972.

In his true rookie season in 1972, Baylor posted a .253 batting average, .416 slugging percentage, 11 home runs, and 38 runs batted in across 102 games. Baylor quickly became a respected hitter for the Orioles, averaging .280 at the plate, a .437 slugging percentage, 46 home runs, and 186 runs batted in between 1973 and 1975. He developed a reputation for getting hit by pitches, frequently leaning into off-target pitches and crowding the plate to get on first base without having to get a hit or work a base on balls. In 1973, Baylor led the American League in hit-by-pitches with 13 and he led the major leagues in 1975 with 13.

=== Oakland Athletics ===
In a transaction influenced by his imminent free agency after the upcoming season, the Orioles traded Baylor with Mike Torrez and Paul Mitchell to the Oakland Athletics for Reggie Jackson, Ken Holtzman and minor-league right-handed pitcher Bill Van Bommel on April 2, 1976. In 1976, Baylor posted a .247 batting average and .368 slugging percentage with 15 home runs and 68 runs batted in. He once again led the major leagues in hit-by-pitches with 20.

=== California Angels ===
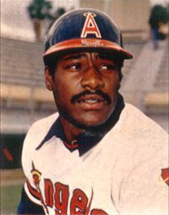
1979 Hostess card of Baylor for the California Angels

In 1977, Baylor signed with the California Angels as a free agent, joining his former Baltimore teammate Bobby Grich in Anaheim. In 1978, his second season with the Angels, Baylor posted a .255 batting average, .472 slugging percentage, 34 home runs, 99 runs batted in, 22 stolen bases, and a league-leading 18 hit-by-pitches. He placed seventh in AL MVP voting that season. In 1979, Baylor led the majors with 139 runs batted in and 120 runs. He was an AL All-Star, the lone selection of his career. He won the AL's MVP award, gaining 20 of 28 first-place votes and led the Angels to their first-ever AL West Division title. Following his MVP season, Baylor's stats regressed. In 1980, he played only 90 games due to a wrist injury. In those games, he posted a modest .250 batting average and .341 slugging percentage with 5 home runs, the lowest in any of his career seasons with double-digit games played. Baylor again missed time due to an injury in the 1981 season, playing only 103 games with an again-regressed batting average of .239 but an improved slugging percentage of .427 with 17 home runs and 66 runs batted in. Upon the arrival of superstar free agent Reggie Jackson in the 1982 offseason, Baylor took him in as a roommate.

In his autobiography titled Don Baylor: It's Nothing But The Truth - A Baseball Life, Baylor told how his friendship with Jackson was tumultuous at times, particularly some instances where Jackson was highly dismissive of fans who wanted pictures or autographs. Baylor returned to full health in the 1982 season, playing 157 games and looking like his old self by posting a .263 batting average with a .424 slugging percentage accompanied by 24 home runs and 93 runs batted in. After Tommy John allowed three runs through the first three innings of the 1982 American League Championship Series against the Brewers, Baylor came up to John and said, "If you hold them to three runs, I'm personally good for four runs against [Milwaukee starter Mike] Caldwell." Baylor delivered on his promise, batting in 5 runs that game as California came back to win 8–3. John later called Baylor the team's "catalyst". Baylor spent six seasons with the Angels and played a plurality of his games with the team. In that time, he batted .262 and slugged .448 with 141 home runs and 523 runs batted in.

=== New York Yankees ===
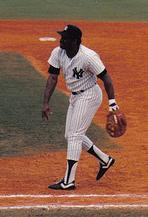
Baylor with the New York Yankees

In 1983, Baylor signed a four-year, $3.7 million contract with the New York Yankees. Former Angels teammate Tommy John said of Baylor, "When we lost him, we lost our guts. Pitchers feared Don Baylor." In his autobiography, Baylor told of Yankee alumnus Tommy John and Reggie Jackson warning Baylor not to sign with New York due to team owner George Steinbrenner's infamous strict and harsh attitude towards players. Baylor said that he found out for himself that the Yankees would treat free agent targets "like a celebrity" and then treat them like a "piece of trash" once they were on the team. In his autobiography, Baylor notes his rough experience in his first spring training with the Yankees as Steinbrenner would obsess over the exhibition games against the rivaling Mets and Red Sox or New York-televised games. This led to Steinbrenner demoting young players for poor performances in such spring training games. In one instance, Steinbrenner tried to make his team play in a televised game on a field that was made subpar by inclement weather.

Baylor's first season with the Yankees was his statistical best as he batted .303 and slugged .494 with 21 home runs and 85 runs batted in. He was awarded his first career Silver Slugger award for his performance. The following season, Baylor's batting percentages dropped but he totaled higher counting stats in fewer games. Baylor had batted .262 and slugged .489 with 27 home runs and 89 runs batted in. Baylor also was less active on the basepaths in 1984, stealing only one base compared to his 17 in the previous season. In the third year of his stint with the Yankees, Baylor's percentages continued to decline, this time posting a .231 average and .430 slugging percentage. He earned his second career Silver Slugger that year. In his 3 seasons with the Yankees, Baylor batted .267, hit 71 home runs, and batted in 265 runs.

=== Boston Red Sox ===
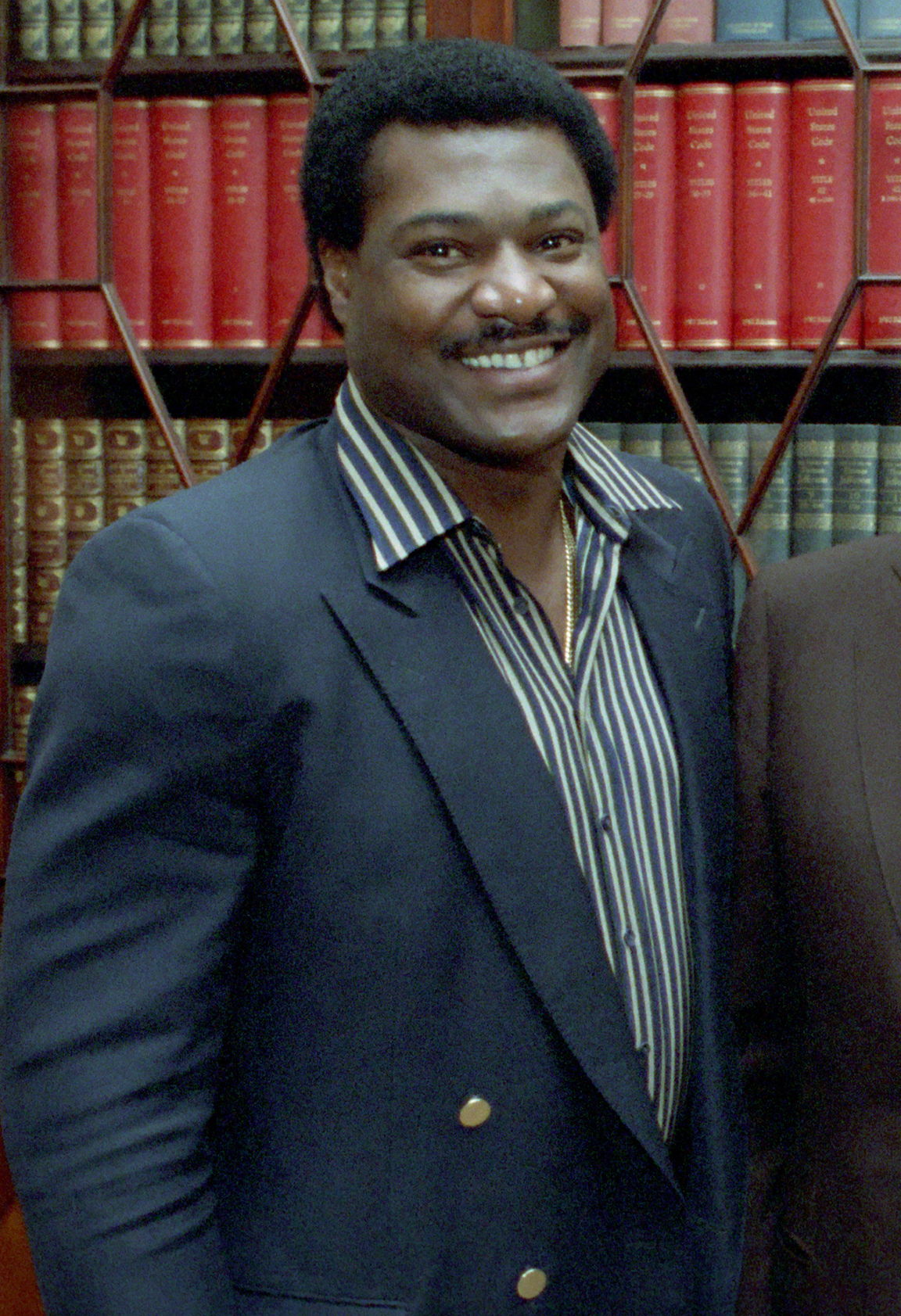
Baylor in 1986

Following the 1985 season, Baylor was traded to the Boston Red Sox for Mike Easler in 1986. It was the first time the Yankees and Red Sox had traded with each other in 14 years. In the 1986 season, Baylor batted .238 with a .439 slugging percentage, 31 home runs, and 94 runs batted in. He was awarded the third Silver Slugger of his career and placed 13th in AL MVP voting.

While a member of the Red Sox, Baylor delivered a key hit in the 1986 American League Championship Series when he hit a two-run home run with one out in the top of the ninth inning during game five against the California Angels. At the time, the Angels led the series three games to one and were one out away from their first ALCS victory. The Red Sox went on to win the game and eventually the ALCS, denying the Angels their first trip to the World Series. Al Michaels, broadcasting the game for ABC, called it the greatest baseball game he had ever seen. However, the Red Sox would fall in the 1986 World Series to the New York Mets in seven games. Baylor played most of the 1987 season with Boston. In 108 games with the Red Sox that year, he batted .239, slugged .404, hit 16 home runs, and batted in 57 runs.

=== Minnesota Twins ===
Late in the 1987 season, the Red Sox traded Baylor to the Minnesota Twins for a player to be named later that ended up being Enrique Rios. He played 20 regular-season games with the Twins and made the postseason roster that year. Baylor aided the Twins in the winning of their 1987 championship by accruing 5 hits, 3 runs, 1 home run, and 3 runs batted in during the World Series.

=== Oakland Athletics (second stint) ===
Baylor returned to the Oakland Athletics in 1988, his final season as a player. The 39-year old Baylor batted a career-low .220 and slugged .326 with 7 home runs and 34 runs batted in through 92 games. Baylor was on the playoff roster for the American League champion Athletics that season. Following the season, he retired as a player from baseball.

== Coaching and managerial career ==
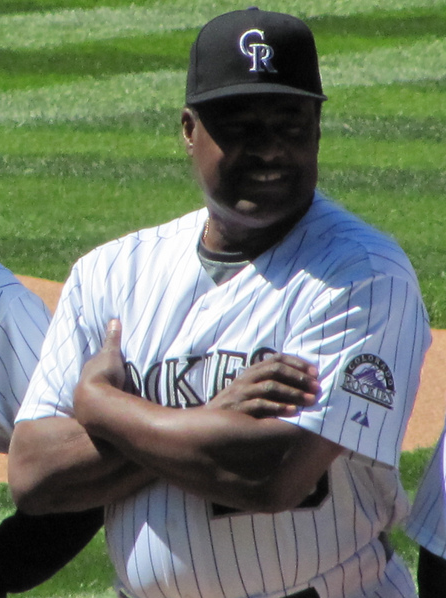
Baylor in 2010 with the Rockies

After retiring as a player, Baylor served as a hitting coach for the Milwaukee Brewers and St. Louis Cardinals until he was named the first manager of the expansion Colorado Rockies. He led the team for six years from 1993 to 1998. The Rockies posted their first winning record (77–67) in 1995 and made the postseason as the wildcard team. As a result, Baylor won the National League Manager of the Year Award.

After the 1998 season, Baylor was fired. He finished his Rockies managerial career with a regular season record of 440–469 and a post–season record of 1–3. He became the hitting coach for the Atlanta Braves in 1999 and was hired to manage the Chicago Cubs in 2000, a job he held through the 2002 season. He had a record of 187–220 with the Cubs. From 2003 to 2004, he served as the bench coach for the New York Mets. He spent the 2005 season with the Seattle Mariners as hitting coach under manager Mike Hargrove and was as a fill-in analyst for MASN in 2007 for Washington Nationals broadcasts.

Baylor served as hitting coach for the Colorado Rockies during the 2009 and 2010 seasons. Baylor was replaced by Carney Lansford after the Rockies hit a franchise-low .226 on the road during the 2010 season. Baylor was offered a special assistant position to remain with Colorado but turned it down.

Baylor agreed on a two-year contract to become hitting coach for the Arizona Diamondbacks for the 2011 and 2012 seasons. He was hired by the Los Angeles Angels of Anaheim as their hitting coach for the 2014 season. On March 31, 2014, Baylor suffered a fracture to his right femur while catching the ceremonial first pitch of the 2014 season, thrown by Vladimir Guerrero. On April 1, 2014, he had surgery to have a plate and screws inserted into his leg. On October 13, 2015, the Angels announced that Baylor would not return as the team hitting coach in 2016.

== Death ==
Baylor was diagnosed with multiple myeloma in 2003. He died on August 7, 2017, at the age of 68.

== Legacy ==
On May 22, 2025, a park in Baylor's hometown of Austin was renamed Don Baylor Neighborhood Park.

== Managerial record ==
Team	Year	Regular season					Postseason			
Team	Year	Games	Won	Lost	Win %	Finish	Won	Lost	Win %	Result
COL	1993	162	67	95	.414	6th in NL West	–	–	–	–
COL	1994	117	53	64	.453	3rd in NL West	–	–	–	–
COL	1995	144	77	67	.535	2nd in NL West	1	3	.250	Lost NLDS (ATL)
COL	1996	162	83	79	.512	3rd in NL West	–	–	–	–
COL	1997	162	83	79	.512	3rd in NL West	–	–	–	–
COL	1998	162	77	85	.475	4th in NL West	–	–	–	–
COL total		909	440	469	.484		1	3	.250	
CHC	2000	162	65	97	.401	5th in NL Central	–	–	–	–
CHC	2001	162	88	74	.543	3rd in NL Central	–	–	–	–
CHC	2002	83	34	49	.410	(fired)	–	–	–	–
CHC total		407	187	220	.459		–	–	–	
Total		1,316	627	689	.476		1	3	.250	

== See also ==
- List of Major League Baseball career home run leaders
- List of Major League Baseball career hits leaders
- List of Major League Baseball career runs scored leaders
- List of Major League Baseball career runs batted in leaders
- List of Major League Baseball career stolen bases leaders
- List of Major League Baseball annual runs batted in leaders
- List of Major League Baseball annual runs scored leaders
- List of St. Louis Cardinals coaches

Sporting positions
Preceded by Tony Muser	Milwaukee Brewers Hitting Coach; 1990–1991	Succeeded by Mike Easler
Preceded by Steve Braun	St. Louis Cardinals Hitting Coach; 1992	Succeeded by Chris Chambliss
Preceded by Clarence Jones	Atlanta Braves Hitting Coach; 1999	Succeeded by Merv Rettenmund
Preceded by Paul Molitor	Seattle Mariners Hitting Coach; 2005	Succeeded by Jeff Pentland
Preceded by Alan Cockrell	Colorado Rockies Hitting Coach; 2009–2010	Succeeded by Carney Lansford
Preceded by Jack Howell	Arizona Diamondbacks Hitting Coach; 2011–2013	Succeeded by Turner Ward
Preceded by Jim Eppard	Los Angeles Angels of Anaheim Hitting Coach; 2014–2015	Succeeded by Dave Hansen
