= Tom Donohue =

American baseball player (born 1952)

- Catcher
- Born: November 15, 1952 (age 73); Westbury, New York, U.S.
- Batted: Right Threw: Right

MLB debut
- April 6, 1979, for the California Angels

Last MLB appearance
- October 5, 1980, for the California Angels

MLB statistics
- Batting average: .200
- Home runs: 5
- Runs batted in: 28
- Stats at Baseball Reference

Teams
- California Angels (1979–1980)

Thomas James Donohue (born November 15, 1952) is an American former professional baseball player who played two seasons for the California Angels of Major League Baseball.

Donohue won the 1967 Senior League World Series with the Westbury Little League. He played college football at Idaho State as a tailback before transferring to Nassau Community College to play college baseball.

Donohue earned a degree in mortuary science at Farmingdale State College after the conclusion of his baseball career and became a funeral director.
