= John Montague (baseball) =

American baseball player (born 1947)

- Pitcher
- Born: September 12, 1947 (age 78); Newport News, Virginia, U.S.
- Batted: Right Threw: Right

MLB debut
- September 9, 1973, for the Montreal Expos

Last MLB appearance
- August 28, 1980, for the California Angels

MLB statistics
- Win–loss record: 24–26
- Earned run average: 4.76
- Strikeouts: 260
- Stats at Baseball Reference

Teams
- Montreal Expos (1973–1975); Philadelphia Phillies (1975); Seattle Mariners (1977–1979); California Angels (1979–1980)

Career highlights and awards
- First save in Mariners history

John Evans Montague (born September 12, 1947), is an American former professional baseball pitcher. He played for the Montreal Expos, Philadelphia Phillies, Seattle Mariners and California Angels of Major League Baseball (MLB) in parts of seven seasons spanning 1973–1980. He was born in Newport News, Virginia.

== Career ==
Montague attended Newport News High School and played college baseball at Old Dominion University, was selected by the Chicago White Sox in the 15th round of the 1965 Major League Baseball draft, but decided not to sign with the team. He was then selected by the Baltimore Orioles in the 3rd round of the 1967 amateur draft. On April 13, 1973, the Orioles sent him to the Montreal Expos in exchange for Mickey Scott.

He made his major league debut for the Expos on September 9, 1973, against the New York Mets, pitching the eighth inning of a game the Expos lost by a score of 3–0, and retiring all three batters he faced. He was with the Expos for two full seasons, with no decisions in the 1973 season in four relief appearances, and ending the 1974 with a 3–4 record and 3 saves in 46 appearances, including one start. He pitched in 12 games for the Expos in 1975, finishing with an 0–1 record and two saves in 12 appearances, before he was picked off waivers by the Philadelphia Phillies on September 2, 1975. He appeared in three games in relief in 1975 in his brief stint with the Phillies.

He was purchased by the Seattle Mariners on November 6, 1976, from the Phillies. As a member of the Mariners' inaugural team, he earned the first save in team history, preserving a 5–1 win against the California Angels at the Kingdome on April 9, 1977, pitching a scoreless eighth and ninth inning and giving up only one walk (erased on a double play). He finished the 1977 with an 8-12 record and four saves in 47 appearances, including 15 as starting pitcher. He only appeared in 19 games for the Marines in 1978, all in relief, ending with a 1–3 record and two saves. Montague started the 1979 season with the Mariners, and had a 6–4 record and one save in 41 appearances with the club.

He was traded by the Mariners on August 29, 1979, to the California Angels for a player to be named later, a trade completed when the Angels sent Jim Anderson to the Mariners on December 5, 1979. He ended the 1979 season with a 2–0 record and six saves in 14 relief appearances. 1980 was his final season in the major leagues, ending his career with a 4–2 record and three saves in 37 appearances, all in relief. The final game of his career was on August 28, 1980, giving up nine hits and six runs (all earned) in a two-inning relief appearance in a 13–8 loss to the Baltimore Orioles.
