= Dave LaRoche =

American baseball player (born 1948)

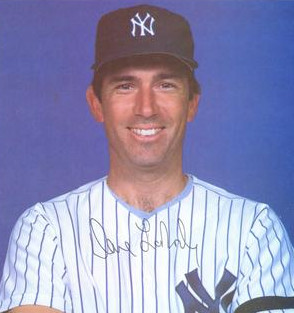
- Laroche in 1981
- Pitcher
- Born: May 14, 1948 (age 77); Colorado Springs, Colorado, U.S.
- Batted: Left Threw: Left

MLB debut
- May 11, 1970, for the California Angels

Last MLB appearance
- August 23, 1983, for the New York Yankees

MLB statistics
- Win–loss record: 65–58
- Earned run average: 3.53
- Strikeouts: 819
- Saves: 126
- Stats at Baseball Reference

Teams
- California Angels (1970–1971); Minnesota Twins (1972); Chicago Cubs (1973–1974); Cleveland Indians (1975–1977); California Angels (1977–1980); New York Yankees (1981–1983)

Career highlights and awards
- 2× All-Star (1976, 1977)

David Eugene LaRoche (né Garcia; born May 14, 1948) is an American former professional baseball pitcher and coach. LaRoche is most famous for throwing his own variant of the eephus pitch, which he called "La Lob". Over his career, LaRoche went 65–58, with 819 strikeouts in 1,049 1/3 innings pitched. He has a career 3.53 ERA.

Before retiring from baseball following the 2015 season, LaRoche was the pitching coach for the New York Mets' short-season affiliate, the Brooklyn Cyclones. He is the father of former MLB players Adam LaRoche and Andy LaRoche.

== Biography ==
LaRoche was born in Colorado Springs, Colorado. His surname was Garcia, but he changed it to LaRoche at age seven, the last name of his stepfather. "LaRoche is French, but I have no French in me", Andy LaRoche said. "My grandfather was 100% Mexican." According to the 1979 Complete Handbook of Baseball, LaRoche decided to change his name because classmates often teased him because an overweight, bumbling character on the then popular television program Zorro was named Sergeant Garcia.

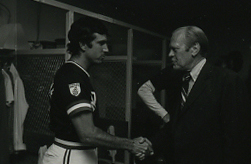
Laroche (left) with Gerald Ford in 1976

LaRoche was drafted by the California Angels in the 5th round of the 1967 amateur draft out of West High School in Torrance, CA. He made his debut for the California Angels in 1970 and went on to pitch 14 seasons in the major leagues.

He went 5–1 with nine saves and a 2.50 earned run average (ERA) with the Angels in 1971 before being traded to the Twins for Leo Cárdenas at the Winter Meetings on November 30. During his time as a player representative with the Twins LaRoche had a reputation as a troublemaker. According to Twins public relations director Tom Mee, LaRoche "complained about everything. In fact, they filed a grievance about the choice of ice cream we had in the clubhouse. [He] loved to agitate, and it was not right." According to Rod Carew, "He was always negative about everything in the locker room. I finally got tired of it one night...we were having a team meeting and he was constantly interrupting people. I said to him, 'Just shut up and listen to what the guys have to say.' He asked what I was going to do about it, so I challenged him to a fight. There was a broom closet in the back of the clubhouse. I opened its door, turned on the light and said, 'Come on, let's go in.' As soon as he walked in, I turned off the light, closed the door and whaled away at him." According to Twins teammate Bert Blyleven, "A reporter asked him why he wanted to be player rep and Dave said, 'Because all the player reps under Calvin Griffith get traded.'" He was traded from the Twins to the Chicago Cubs for Bill Hands, Joe Decker and minor‐league pitcher Bob Maneely on December 1, 1972.

LaRoche had 17 and 21 saves in 1975 and 1976 respectively with the Indians. He began the 1977 campaign with a 2–2 record and four saves before returning to the Angels along with Dave Schuler from the Indians for Sid Monge, Bruce Bochte and cash on May 11.

LaRoche's sons Adam (a first baseman) and Andy (a third baseman) both became MLB players. Another son, Jeff LaRoche, played minor league baseball before entering law enforcement.

LaRoche was named as the pitching coach for the Jacksonville Jumbo Shrimp in the Miami Marlins organization for the 2018 season.

== See also ==
- List of second-generation Major League Baseball players
- List of Major League Baseball leaders in games finished
