= Merv Rettenmund =

American baseball player (1943–2024)

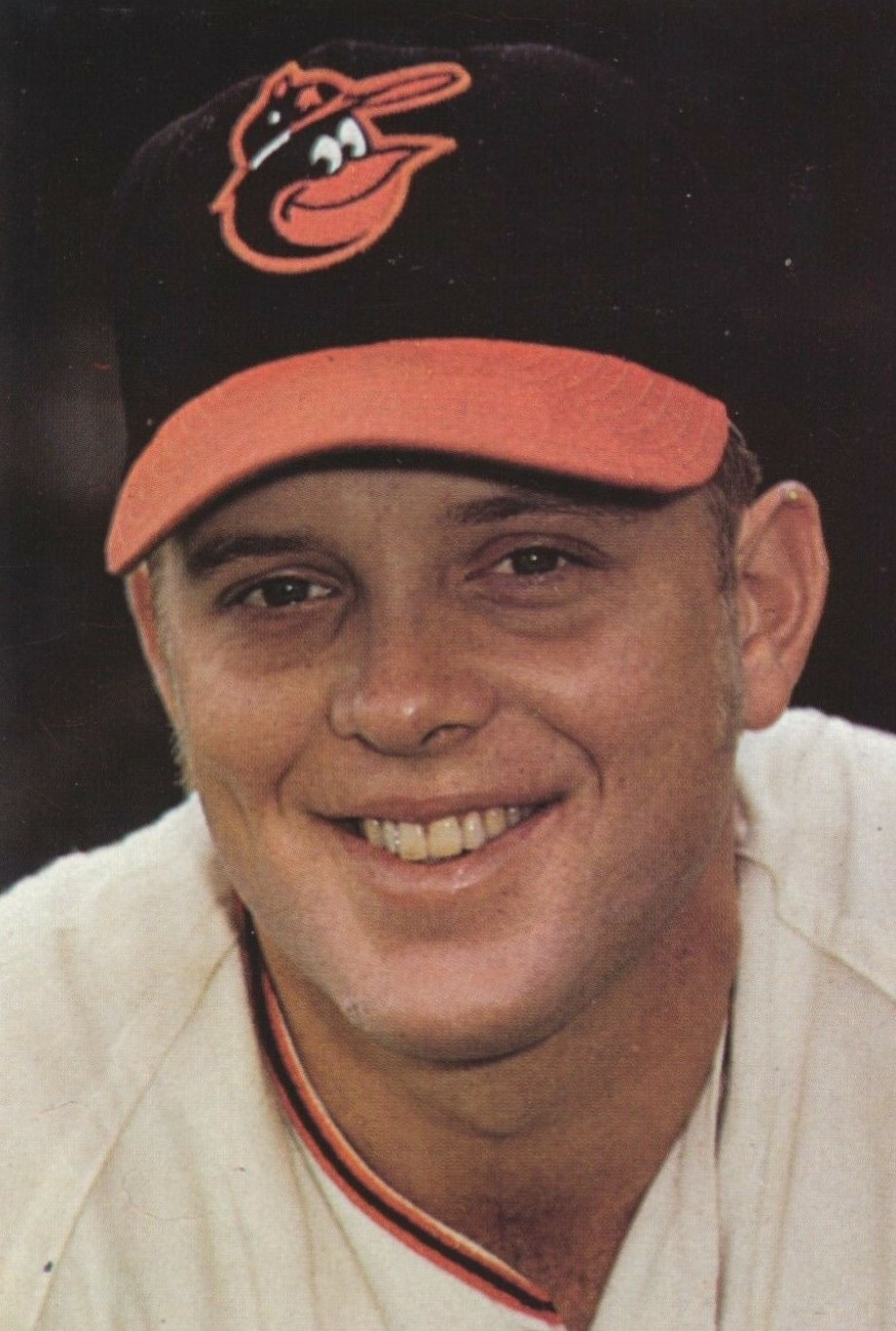
- Rettenmund in 1971
- Outfielder
- Born: June 6, 1943; Flint, Michigan, U.S.
- Died: December 7, 2024 (aged 81); San Diego, California, U.S.
- Batted: Right Threw: Right

MLB debut
- April 14, 1968, for the Baltimore Orioles

Last MLB appearance
- June 22, 1980, for the California Angels

MLB statistics
- Batting average: .271
- Home runs: 66
- Runs batted in: 329
- Stats at Baseball Reference

Teams
- As player: Baltimore Orioles (1968–1973); Cincinnati Reds (1974–1975); San Diego Padres (1976–1977); California Angels (1978–1980); As coach: Texas Rangers (1983–1985); Oakland Athletics (1989–1990); San Diego Padres (1991–1999); Atlanta Braves (2000–2001); Detroit Tigers (2002); San Diego Padres (2006–2007)

Career highlights and awards
- 3× World Series champion (1970, 1975, 1989)

Mervin Weldon Rettenmund (June 6, 1943 – December 7, 2024) was an American professional baseball player and coach. He played in Major League Baseball as an outfielder from 1968 through 1980, most notably as a member of the Baltimore Orioles dynasty that won three consecutive American League pennants from 1969 to 1971 and, won the World Series in 1970. Rettenmund also won world championships as a player for the Cincinnati Reds (1975) and as a coach for the Oakland Athletics (1989).

== Early life ==
Rettenmund attended Flint Southwestern High School, where he played baseball and American football. In the summer after his senior year, he played as a catcher for the Buick Colts of the Michigan American Legion, contributing to the team winning the city and state championships. He turned down a contract offer from the Detroit Tigers of MLB. He accepted a football scholarship from Ball State University, so the school could sign more baseball players. He lettered in baseball and football, receiving all-league honors in both sports.

As a football player, he played at running back and wide receiver. As a senior, he only played in 3 games after suffering a severe ankle sprain. He set the school career record for rushing yards per attempt: 7.6 yards (on 161 career carries). In baseball, he was a two-time All-Indiana Collegiate Conference selection. He set the school career home run record.

In 1976, he was inducted into the Ball State Athletics Hall of Fame.

== Professional career ==
Rettenmund was selected by the Dallas Cowboys in the 19th round (257th overall) of the 1965 NFL draft. Unbeknownst to the Cowboys, he had signed a professional baseball contract with the Baltimore Orioles of MLB one day earlier on November 28.

In 1965, he was assigned to the Single-A Stockton Ports to finish out the year. In 1966, he played in the California League and received All-Star honors after hitting .307 with 21 home runs in 127 games.

In 1967, he hit .286, before suffering a separated shoulder late in the summer. He played in the Venezuelan Professional Baseball League during winter.

In 1968, he received the Minor League Player-of-the-Year award. He helped the Orioles win the 1969 and 1971 American League pennant, the 1970 World Series (including hitting a home run in the deciding Game 5 over the Cincinnati Reds) and the 1973 AL Eastern Division, the Reds win the 1975 World Series and the Angels win the 1979 AL Western Division. He also served as hitting coach for the 1989 World Series champion Oakland Athletics, as well as the Athletics' 1990 A.L. pennant-winners, and the 1998 National League champion San Diego Padres.

He finished 19th in voting for the 1971 American League Most Valuable Player Award after compiling a .318 batting average (which was third-best in the American League), with 11 home runs, 75 runs batted in, and 81 runs scored.

After the trade of Frank Robinson to the Los Angeles Dodgers in early December 1971, Rettenmund began the 1972 season as the Orioles' starting right fielder. By 1973, he was out of the starting lineup due to injuries, prolonged batting slumps and the emergence of Al Bumbry and Rich Coggins. Rettenmund, along with Junior Kennedy and Bill Wood, was sent to the Cincinnati Reds for Ross Grimsley and Wally Williams on December 4, 1973.

After posting his two best seasons in 1970 and 1971, his production steadily declined to the end of his career in 1980. His batting average after the 1971 season stood at a solid .306 with 35 home runs and 165 RBI, but from 1972 to 1980 he hit only .246 with 31 home runs and 164 RBI. He was an effective pinch hitter, batting .276 (66-for-239) with 5 home runs and 39 RBI.

In 13 seasons, he played in 1,023 games and finished with a .271 batting average, 66 home runs and 329 runs batted in. He recorded a .985 fielding percentage while playing all three outfield positions.

After his major league playing career, Rettenmund served as hitting coach for the Texas Rangers (1983–85), the Athletics (1989–90), the Padres (1991–99), the Atlanta Braves (2000–01), and the Detroit Tigers (2002).

After three years out of the majors, Rettenmund returned as hitting coach of the Padres in June 2006, replacing Dave Magadan. However, he was replaced on July 31, 2007, by Wally Joyner.

== Personal life and death ==
Rettenmund later resided in San Diego, California. He died there on December 7, 2024, at the age of 81.

== Other honors ==
- Named a Distinguished Graduate of Ball State University in 1972.
- Inducted as a charter member of the Ball State University Hall of Fame in 1976.
