= Carney Lansford =

American baseball player (born 1957)

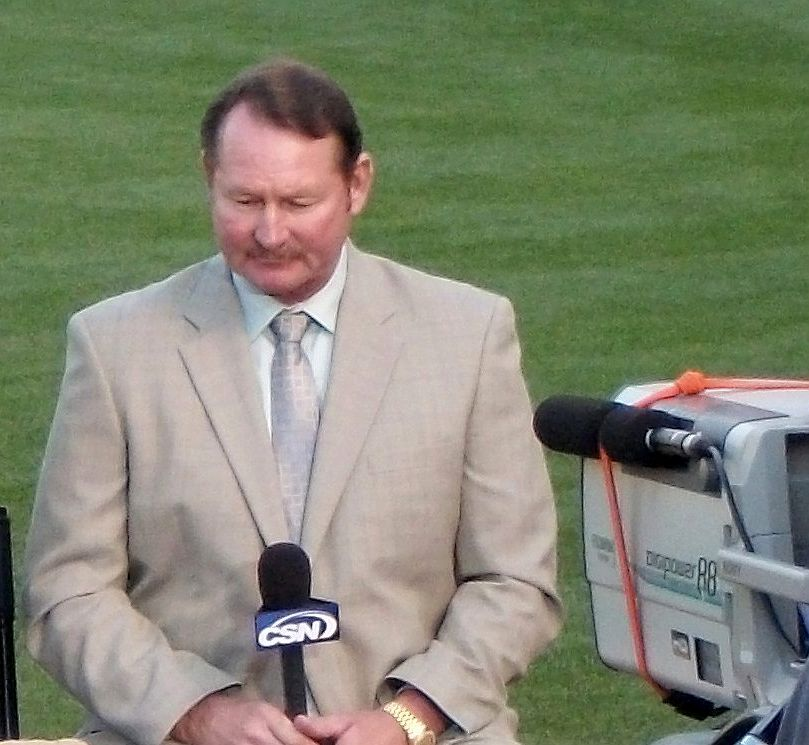
- Lansford in 2010
- Third baseman
- Born: February 7, 1957 (age 69); San Jose, California, U.S.
- Batted: Right Threw: Right

MLB debut
- April 8, 1978, for the California Angels

Last MLB appearance
- October 4, 1992, for the Oakland Athletics

MLB statistics
- Batting average: .290
- Hits: 2,074
- Home runs: 151
- Runs batted in: 874
- Stats at Baseball Reference

Teams
- As player: California Angels (1978–1980); Boston Red Sox (1981–1982); Oakland Athletics (1983–1992); As coach: San Francisco Giants (2008–2009); Colorado Rockies (2011–2012)

Career highlights and awards
- All-Star (1988); World Series champion (1989); Silver Slugger Award (1981); AL batting champion (1981); Athletics Hall of Fame

Carney Ray Lansford (born February 7, 1957) is an American former professional baseball player and coach. He played in Major League Baseball (MLB) as a third baseman from 1978 to 1992, most notably as a member of the Oakland Athletics team that won three consecutive American League pennants and a World Series championship in 1989. He also played for the California Angels and the Boston Red Sox. Lansford won the 1981 American League batting championship as a member of the Red Sox and was an American League All-Star in 1988 with the Athletics. In 2023, he was inducted into the Athletics Hall of Fame.

== Career ==
Drafted by the California Angels in the 3rd round of the 1975 Major League Baseball draft, Lansford was the Angels' most successful rookie in 1978 and finished third in the overall AL Rookie of the Year vote. He was traded along with Rick Miller and Mark Clear from the Angels to the Red Sox for Rick Burleson and Butch Hobson on December 10, 1980. In 1981, he won the American League batting title in the strike-shortened season, becoming the league's first right-handed hitter to do so in 11 years. However, the emergence of Wade Boggs resulted in the Red Sox sending Lansford to Oakland in a trade involving Tony Armas during the 1982 off-season.

Lansford became the Athletics' regular third baseman and was there for their 1988 through 1992 dynasty, typically hitting second behind Rickey Henderson. Lansford narrowly missed winning his second batting title in 1989 with a .336 average (Minnesota's Kirby Puckett finished with a .339 average). Although his power numbers dropped off during those years, and he missed almost all the 1991 season with an injury, Lansford's speed and solid hitting made him a significant contributor to the A's dynasty. He played in three World Series with the A's, losing in 1988 and 1990 and winning in 1989.

In his 15-year career, Lansford was a .290 hitter with 151 home runs, 874 RBI, and 224 stolen bases in 1862 games. In five American League Championship Series and three World Series covering 33 games, he hit .305 (39-for-128) with two home runs and 18 RBI.

Baseball writer Bill James ranked Lansford as the 39th best 3rd baseman all-time but heavily criticized his defense and wrote that "he was a good hitter but he was an awful third baseman."

== Coaching career ==
Lansford was a hitting coach for the San Francisco Giants during the 2008 and 2009 seasons. He was relieved of his duties following the 2009 season. In 2011, Lansford was hired by the Colorado Rockies. In 2015, He was the hitting coach for the Lamigo Monkeys of the Chinese Professional Baseball League (Taiwan).

== Personal life ==
Lansford was born in San Jose and grew up in Santa Clara. He had a cameo role as Kit "Hit or Die" Kesey, the Chicago White Sox batter that Mel Clark (played by Tony Danza) retires for the final out in the Angels' pennant-winning game in the 1994 remake of Angels in the Outfield.

His son, Jared, was drafted by Oakland in the second round of the 2005 amateur draft. His other son, Josh, was a third baseman in the Chicago Cubs minor league system. His brother, Jody Lansford, spent nine seasons in the minor leagues, briefly breaking into the big leagues with the San Diego Padres, for whom he recorded 30 at bats with six hits in parts of two seasons, with one career home run. His other brother, Phil Lansford, was drafted 10th overall in the 1978 draft but never made it to the majors.

He played for the Briarwood Little League team, from Santa Clara, California, which made it to the finals of the 1969 Little League World Series. In the final game of the World Series on August 2, Carney's team was defeated 5-0 by the team from Taipei City, Taiwan. Lansford is one of fewer than a dozen men who have played in both the Little League World Series and the MLB World Series.

Lansford went to Wilcox High School in Santa Clara, California. The school's baseball field is named for him.

== See also ==
- List of Major League Baseball career hits leaders
- List of Silver Slugger Award winners at third base
- List of Boston Red Sox award winners
- List of Major League Baseball career runs scored leaders
- List of Major League Baseball career stolen bases leaders
- List of Major League Baseball batting champions
- List of St. Louis Cardinals coaches
