= 1977 in baseball =

The following are the baseball events of the year 1977 throughout the world.

== Champions ==
=== Major League Baseball ===
- World Series: New York Yankees over Los Angeles Dodgers (4–2); Reggie Jackson, MVP

League Championship Series (ALCS, NLCS)
East	NY Yankees	3
West	Kansas City	2
East	Philadelphia	1
West	Los Angeles	3

World Series
AL	NY Yankees	4
NL	Los Angeles	2

- American League Championship Series MVP: None
- National League Championship Series MVP: Dusty Baker
- All-Star Game, July 19 at Yankee Stadium: National League, 7–5; Don Sutton, MVP

=== Other champions ===
- College World Series: Arizona State
- Japan Series: Hankyu Braves over Yomiuri Giants (4–1)
- Big League World Series: Taipei, Taiwan
- Little League World Series: Li-Teh, Kaohsiung, Taiwan
- Senior League World Series: Taipei, Taiwan

Winter Leagues

- 1977 Caribbean Series: Tigres del Licey
- Dominican Republic League: Tigres del Licey
- Mexican Pacific League: Venados de Mazatlán
- Puerto Rican League: Criollos de Caguas
- Venezuelan League: Navegantes del Magallanes

== Awards and honors ==
- Baseball Hall of Fame
  - Ernie Banks
  - Martín Dihigo
  - John Henry Lloyd
  - Amos Rusie
  - Joe Sewell
  - Al López (manager)

Baseball Writers' Association of America Awards
BBWAA Award	National League	American League
Rookie of the Year	Andre Dawson (MON)	Eddie Murray (BAL)
Cy Young Award	Steve Carlton (PHI)	Sparky Lyle (NYY)
Most Valuable Player	George Foster (CIN)	Rod Carew (MIN)
Babe Ruth Award (World Series MVP)	—	Reggie Jackson (NYY)
Gold Glove Awards
Position	National League	American League
Pitcher	Jim Kaat (PHI)	Jim Palmer (BAL)
Catcher	Johnny Bench (CIN)	Jim Sundberg (TEX)
1st Base	Steve Garvey (LAD)	Jim Spencer (CWS)
2nd Base	Joe Morgan (CIN)	Frank White (KC)
3rd Base	Mike Schmidt (PHI)	Graig Nettles (NYY)
Shortstop	Dave Concepción (CIN)	Mark Belanger (BAL)
Outfield	César Gerónimo (CIN)	Juan Beníquez (TEX)
Outfield	Garry Maddox (PHI)	Al Cowens (KC)
Outfield	Dave Parker (PIT)	Carl Yastrzemski (BOS)

- Woman Executive of the Year (major or minor league)
  - Mary Anne Whitacre, Hawaii Islanders, Pacific Coast League

== Statistical leaders ==
	American League		National League	
Stat	Player	Total	Player	Total
AVG	Rod Carew (MIN)	.388	Dave Parker (PIT)	.338
HR	Jim Rice (BOS)	39	George Foster (CIN)	52
RBI	Larry Hisle (MIN)	119	George Foster (CIN)	149
W	Dave Goltz (MIN); Dennis Leonard (KC); Jim Palmer (BAL)	20	Steve Carlton (PHI)	23
ERA	Frank Tanana (CAL)	2.54	John Candelaria (PIT)	2.34
K	Nolan Ryan (CAL)	341	Phil Niekro (ATL)	262

== Major league baseball final standings ==
=== American League final standings ===
AL East
Team	W	L	Pct.	GB	Home	Road
New York Yankees	100	62	.617	—	55‍–‍26	45‍–‍36
Baltimore Orioles	97	64	.602	2½	54‍–‍27	43‍–‍37
Boston Red Sox	97	64	.602	2½	51‍–‍29	46‍–‍35
Detroit Tigers	74	88	.457	26	39‍–‍42	35‍–‍46
Cleveland Indians	71	90	.441	28½	37‍–‍44	34‍–‍46
Milwaukee Brewers	67	95	.414	33	37‍–‍44	30‍–‍51
Toronto Blue Jays	54	107	.335	45½	25‍–‍55	29‍–‍52

AL West
Team	W	L	Pct.	GB	Home	Road
Kansas City Royals	102	60	.630	—	55‍–‍26	47‍–‍34
Texas Rangers	94	68	.580	8	44‍–‍37	50‍–‍31
Chicago White Sox	90	72	.556	12	48‍–‍33	42‍–‍39
Minnesota Twins	84	77	.522	17½	48‍–‍32	36‍–‍45
California Angels	74	88	.457	28	39‍–‍42	35‍–‍46
Seattle Mariners	64	98	.395	38	29‍–‍52	35‍–‍46
Oakland Athletics	63	98	.391	38½	35‍–‍46	28‍–‍52

Locations of teams for the 1977–1981 American League seasons
West East

=== National League final standings ===
NL East
Team	W	L	Pct.	GB	Home	Road
Philadelphia Phillies	101	61	.623	—	60‍–‍21	41‍–‍40
Pittsburgh Pirates	96	66	.593	5	58‍–‍23	38‍–‍43
St. Louis Cardinals	83	79	.512	18	52‍–‍31	31‍–‍48
Chicago Cubs	81	81	.500	20	46‍–‍35	35‍–‍46
Montreal Expos	75	87	.463	26	38‍–‍43	37‍–‍44
New York Mets	64	98	.395	37	35‍–‍44	29‍–‍54

NL West
Team	W	L	Pct.	GB	Home	Road
Los Angeles Dodgers	98	64	.605	—	51‍–‍30	47‍–‍34
Cincinnati Reds	88	74	.543	10	48‍–‍33	40‍–‍41
Houston Astros	81	81	.500	17	46‍–‍35	35‍–‍46
San Francisco Giants	75	87	.463	23	38‍–‍43	37‍–‍44
San Diego Padres	69	93	.426	29	35‍–‍46	34‍–‍47
Atlanta Braves	61	101	.377	37	40‍–‍41	21‍–‍60

Locations of teams for the 1977–1992 National League seasons
West East

== Nippon Professional Baseball final standings ==
=== Central League final standings ===
Central League
Team	G	W	L	T	Pct.	GB
Yomiuri Giants	130	80	46	4	.635	–
Yakult Swallows	130	62	58	10	.517	15.0
Chunichi Dragons	130	64	61	5	.512	15.5
Hanshin Tigers	130	55	63	12	.466	21.0
Hiroshima Toyo Carp	130	51	67	12	.432	25.0
Taiyo Whales	130	51	68	11	.429	25.5

=== Pacific League final standings ===
Pacific League
Team	G	W	L	T	Pct.	1st half ranking	2nd half ranking
Hankyu Braves	130	69	51	10	.575	1	2
Nankai Hawks	130	63	55	12	.534	2	3
Lotte Orions	130	60	57	13	.513	5	1
Kintetsu Buffaloes	130	59	61	10	.492	3	6
Nippon-Ham Fighters	130	58	61	11	.487	4	4
Crown Lighter Lions	130	49	73	8	.402	6	5

== Events ==
=== January ===
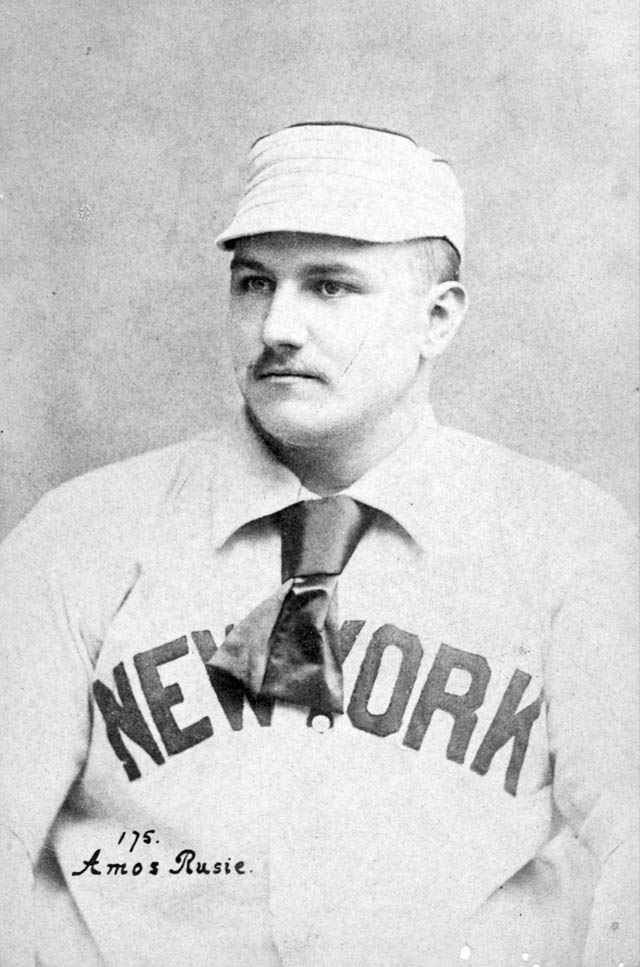
Amos Rusie

- January 1 – Milwaukee Brewers pitcher Danny Frisella is killed in a dune buggy accident in Arizona.
- January 2 – Not even a full season into owning the Atlanta Braves, Ted Turner is suspended by Commissioner Bowie Kuhn for tampering with the signing of Gary Matthews. In addition, the Braves are stripped of their first round selections in the June 1978 baseball draft. Turner successfully appeals the suspension, and the draft picks are reinstated.
- January 4 – Mary Shane is hired by the Chicago White Sox as MLB's first woman TV play-by-play announcer.
- January 6:
  - California Angels shortstop Mike Miley is killed in a single-car accident in Baton Rouge, Louisiana.
  - Future Hall-of-Fame first baseman Willie McCovey, four days shy of his 39th birthday, returns to the San Francisco Giants as a free agent. The slugger had spent 1974–1976 with the San Diego Padres and Oakland Athletics. Playing with his original and longtime (1959–1973) team, McCovey enjoys a renaissance in 1977, playing in 141 games, smashing 28 home runs, and batting .280 with 134 hits.
- January 11 – The Chicago Cubs trade pitcher Mike Garman and outfielder Rick Monday to the Los Angeles Dodgers for minor league pitcher Jeff Albert, first baseman Bill Buckner and shortstop Iván DeJesús.
- January 19 – The Baseball Writers' Association of America elects Ernie Banks to the Baseball Hall of Fame in his first year of eligibility.
- January 20 – The Baltimore Orioles trade outfielder Paul Blair to the New York Yankees in exchange for outfielders Elliott Maddox and Rick Bladt.
- January 31 – The Special Veterans Committee selects Amos Rusie, Joe Sewell and Al López to the Hall of Fame. Pitcher Rusie, the "Hoosier Thunderbolt", played in the 19th century and died in 1942; Sewell, now 89, was an American League second baseman between 1920 and 1933; and López, 80, a catcher who appeared behind the plate in 1,1918 games between 1928 and 1947.

=== February ===
Martín Dihigo

- February 2 – Fritz Peterson, who gained notoriety in 1973 as a member of the New York Yankees when he and teammate Mike Kekich swapped wives and families, is released by the Texas Rangers, ending his major league career. In 355 games pitched over 11 seasons, Peterson posted a 133–131 won–lost record (3.30 earned run average) with 20 shutouts and one 20-win season (1970) for the Yanks, Rangers and Cleveland Indians.
- February 3 – The Special Committee on the Negro Leagues elects Martín Dihigo and John Henry Lloyd to the Baseball Hall of Fame. Dihigo, a dominant pitcher born in Cuba, also is one of just two players to be inducted to the Cuban, Dominican Republic, Mexican Baseball and Venezuelan Halls of Fame, being the other Willie Wells. Lloyd, a standout shortstop and prolific hitter, played in the Negro Leagues from 1906 through 1932, and is also a member of the Cuban and Mexican Halls of Fame. The committee then dissolves, its functions being taken over by the Veterans Committee.
- February 5 – The Chicago Cubs trade pitcher Darold Knowles to the Texas Rangers for a "Player to be named later (PTBNL)." Outfielder Gene Clines is later sent to Chicago to complete the deal.
- February 11 – The Cubs continue their busy off-season, sending third baseman and 1975–1976 National League batting champion Bill Madlock and second baseman Rob Sperring to the San Francisco Giants for third baseman Steve Ontiveros, outfielder Bobby Murcer and minor-league pitcher Andrew Muhlstock.
- February 16:
  - Third baseman Dave Roberts, acquired by the brand-new Toronto Blue Jays from the San Diego Padres on October 22, 1976, is traded back to the Padres in exchange for pitcher Jerry Johnson.
  - The Cubs make their fourth trade in five weeks, sending outfielder Champ Summers to the Cincinnati Reds for outfielder Dave Schneck.
- February 18 – The New York Yankees trade Sandy Alomar to the Texas Rangers for fellow infielders Brian Doyle and Greg Pryor.
- February 19 – The Oakland Athletics sell the contract of veteran relief pitcher Paul Lindblad to the Rangers for a reported $400,000.
- February 23 – The Detroit Tigers sign veteran second baseman Tito Fuentes, 33, who had been granted free agency from the San Diego Padres on December 1, 1976. Fuentes will start 149 games at second for the 1977 Tigers before ceding his position to top prospect Lou Whitaker in 1978.
- February 24 – The Oakland Athletics trade veteran first baseman/outfielder Ron Fairly to the Toronto Blue Jays for minor league infielder Mike Weathers. Fairly, a key member of the Montreal Expos from June 1969 through the 1974 season, will become the first major leaguer to play for both Canadian franchises.

=== March ===
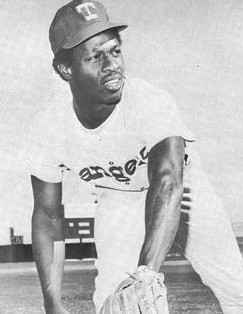
Lenny Randle

- March 2 – Free-agent pitcher Ed Farmer is signed by the Baltimore Orioles.
- March 15:
  - Oakland Athletics owner Charles O. Finley announces four trades, three of them with the Chicago Cubs, in an attempt to remake his team after free agency has liberated his former stars to sign elsewhere. His three transactions with the Cubs net him pitcher Joe Coleman and outfielder Jim Tyrone in exchange for pitcher Jim Todd and infielders Gaylen Pitts and Jerry Tabb.
  - In his most significant transaction, made with the Pittsburgh Pirates, Finley obtains six players—pitchers Doug Bair, Dave Giusti, Rick Langford and Doc Medich and outfielders Tony Armas and Mitchell Page—in exchange for pitcher Chris Batton, American League All-Star second baseman Phil Garner, and veteran infielder Tommy Helms.
- March 16 – Finley's Oakland Athletics sign veteran seven-time All-Star slugger and 1972 AL MVP Dick Allen, 35, who had been granted free agency from the Philadelphia Phillies on November 5, 1977.
- March 17 – Charlie Finley is in the news again. A federal court rules in favor of Commissioner of Baseball Bowie Kuhn's decision—"in the best interest of baseball"—to void his Oakland Athletics' June 1976 deals that saw the team sell the contracts of Rollie Fingers and Joe Rudi to the Boston Red Sox and Vida Blue to the New York Yankees for a total of $3.5 million. Finley had sued Kuhn and MLB to force the deals to go through.
- March 18 – The Minnesota Twins sign free agent pitcher Geoff Zahn, released by the Chicago Cubs on January 17.
- March 21 – The Detroit Tigers' Mark Fidrych, 1976 American League Rookie of the Year, rips the cartilage in his left knee shagging fly balls in the outfield. He will undergo surgery March 31 and not return to the mound until May 27.
- March 26:
  - The Oakland Athletics trade 22-year-old outfielder Claudell Washington, a 1975 AL All-Star, to the Texas Rangers for pitcher Jim Umbarger, infielder Rodney "Cool Breeze" Scott, and cash.
  - The Houston Astros trade second baseman Rob Andrews and cash to the San Francisco Giants for second baseman Rob Sperring and outfielder Willie Crawford.
  - The Boston Red Sox release popular third baseman Rico Petrocelli, 33, a 13-year veteran and two-time American League All-Star. Instead of signing with another team, Petrocelli opts to retire from baseball.
- March 28:
  - While in Orlando, Florida for an exhibition game with the Minnesota Twins, Texas Rangers second baseman Lenny Randle, angered with manager Frank Lucchesi over playing time and remarks Lucchesi has made to the press, exchanges heated words with his manager during batting practice. When the argument escalates, Randle punches Lucchesi, still in street clothes, in the face and knocks him down. Lucchesi is hospitalized for a week: he needs plastic surgery to repair his fractured cheekbone, broken in three places. He also receives bruises to his kidney and back. The Rangers suspend Randle for 30 days without pay and fine him $10,000; he never plays for them again. Randle is also charged with assault and pleads no contest to battery charges in a Florida court, where he is slapped with an additional $1,050 fine.
  - The Cincinnati Reds trade outfielder Joel Youngblood to the St. Louis Cardinals in exchange for pitcher Bill Caudill.
- March 29 – The Cleveland Indians reacquire outfielder John Lowenstein from the Toronto Blue Jays for shortstop Héctor Torres.
- March 30 – The Seattle Mariners trade pitcher Roy Thomas, who had been selected in the expansion draft, to the Houston Astros for second baseman Larry Milbourne.

=== April ===
Tommy Lasorda introduces Lillian Carter to his players at the 1977 World Series

- April 4 – The Pittsburgh Pirates acquire outfielder Mike Easler from the California Angels for minor-league pitcher Randy Sealy.
- April 5:
  - The New York Yankees acquire shortstop Bucky Dent from the Chicago White Sox for pitchers LaMarr Hoyt and Bob Polinsky, outfielder Oscar Gamble and $200,000. Dent, 25, a 1975 American League All-Star with the Pale Hose, will have a notable six-year tenure in Yankee pinstripes—hitting one of the most famous homers in club history in 1978, earning two World Series rings in 1977 and 1978 (in which he will star as the Series' MVP), and making two more All-Star teams.
  - The Los Angeles Dodgers sign veteran Boog Powell, the 1970 American League Most Valuable Player, who was released by the Cleveland Indians on March 30. Powell, 35, will pinch hit in 47 games for the 1977 Dodgers.
- April 6 – Before 57,762 fans, the Seattle Mariners play their first American League game and open their home stadium, the Kingdome, with a 7–0 loss to the California Angels. José Báez' first-inning single is the first hit in Mariners' history.
- April 7:
  - After the grounds crew clears snow from the field before Opening Day festivities, the Toronto Blue Jays play their first game in franchise history, defeating the Chicago White Sox 9–5 at Exhibition Stadium. Near-freezing temperatures greet the inaugural crowd of 44,649, and snow flurries fly throughout the afternoon. In the home half of the first inning, Toronto first baseman Doug Ault enters the history books with the Jays' first-ever hit—their first home run.
  - Frank Sinatra keeps a promise and sings The Star-Spangled Banner on Opening Day at Dodger Stadium. Sinatra had promised Tommy Lasorda that he would sing the anthem if Lasorda ever became manager of the Los Angeles Dodgers.
- April 12 – The Detroit Tigers trade Willie Horton, who has played for the team since 1963, to the Texas Rangers for pitcher Steve Foucault.
- April 15 – Before a crowd of 57,592, the Montreal Expos play their first game at Montreal's Olympic Stadium. The visiting Philadelphia Phillies spoil their home opener, 7–2, behind future Hall of Fame left-hander Steve Carlton.
- April 17:
  - Umpires Terry Tata, Ed Sudol, Dick Stello and Bruce Froemming walk off the field in protest after the video screen at Fulton County Stadium shows the replay of a controversial, disputed call involving Bob Watson of the Houston Astros scoring at a run at home plate. The crew returns to the field after they are promised the replay will never happen again.
  - Less than a week after earning his first win in the major leagues, Mike Pazik of the Minnesota Twins is involved in a collision. A driver exiting the highway the wrong way strikes Pazik's van head on. The accident results in Pazik suffering two broken legs, thus ending his baseball career.
- April 24:
  - Canadian right-hander Ferguson Jenkins, a future Hall of Famer, throws the first shutout ever in Exhibition Stadium as the visiting Boston Red Sox defeat the Toronto Blue Jays 9–0.
  - Charlie Hough hits what will be the only homer of his 25-year MLB career, as he closes out the Los Angeles Dodgers' 16–6 victory over the Braves at Fulton County Stadium.
- April 25 – The Cincinnati Reds defeat the Atlanta Braves 23–9. The Reds score 12 runs in one inning and outfielder George Foster scores five runs and drives in seven.
- April 26 – Before completing his suspension with the Texas Rangers, Lenny Randle is traded to the New York Mets for a player to be named later (PTBNL). The Rangers will receive shortstop Rick Auerbach from New York on May 20.
- April 27:
  - The New York Yankees acquire pitcher Mike Torrez from the Oakland Athletics in exchange for pitcher Dock Ellis, infielder Marty Perez and outfielder Larry Murray. While Torrez will only spend one season in pinstripes—and throw two complete-game victories for them in the 1977 World Series—he'll become a part of Yankees lore the following season when, as a member of the Boston Red Sox, he surrenders Bucky Dent's home run that helps the Yankees win the 1978 American League East championship.
  - Garry Templeton of the St. Louis Cardinals scores five runs in a game, setting a team record as the Cardinals rout the Chicago Cubs at Wrigley Field 20–3.
  - The Montreal Expos and San Francisco Giants trade shortstops, with the Expos acquiring Chris Speier from San Francisco for Tim Foli.
- April 30:
  - The red-hot Los Angeles Dodgers defeat the visiting Montreal Expos behind Rick Rhoden's solid eight-inning effort to improve their April record to 17–3, opening up a 7½-game lead in the National League West division over the two-time world champion Cincinnati Reds.
  - Dennis Eckersley throws 11 shutout innings and Dave LaRoche nails down the save as the Cleveland Indians defeat the Milwaukee Brewers 1–0 (12 innings) at County Stadium. The winning run is unearned and spoils a stellar, 11⅓-inning start by the Brewer's Jim Slaton.

=== May ===
- May 9:
  - In a nationally televised ABC Monday Night Baseball game between the St. Louis Cardinals and the Cincinnati Reds, Al Hrabosky, the "Mad Hungarian", loads the bases in the eighth inning with the score tied 5–5, then proceeds to strike out George Foster, Johnny Bench, and Bob Bailey to the delight of the fans at Busch Memorial Stadium. The Cardinals win 6–5 on a walk-off home run by Ted Simmons in the home half of the tenth.
  - The Toronto Blue Jays acquire third baseman Roy Howell from the Texas Rangers for pitcher Steve Hargan, shortstop Jim Mason and $200,000. On the field, the Jays defeat the Seattle Mariners 10–4 at Exhibition Stadium in the first on-field meeting between 1977's two AL expansion teams.
- May 11:
  - Atlanta Braves owner Ted Turner fires manager Dave Bristol and names himself manager before a game against the Pittsburgh Pirates. The Braves lose 2–1, their 17th consecutive loss. Turner is then ordered by National League president Chub Feeney to desist; soon after, owners are banned from managing. Coach Vern Benson will pilot the Braves on May 12 to a 6–1 win, breaking the losing streak. Then Bristol is reinstated to the manager's post for the remainder of the season.
  - The California Angels trade first baseman Bruce Bochte and pitcher Sid Monge to the Cleveland Indians for pitchers Dave LaRoche and Dave Schuler.
- May 14 – Jim Colborn throws a no-hitter as the Kansas City Royals defeat the Texas Rangers 6–0. Colborn is the first Royal to pitch a no-hitter at Royals Stadium, later renamed Kauffman Stadium.
- May 17:
  - Mets ace Tom Seaver pitches his fifth career one-hitter, a 6–0 shutout of the Chicago Cubs. Seaver's no-hit bid is broken up by Steve Ontiveros on a bloop single in the fifth.
  - The visiting New York Yankees score three runs in the top of the 15th to defeat the Oakland Athletics 5–2. Sparky Lyle throws 6⅔ innings of scoreless relief for the win and rookie Dell Alston tallies the winning run in his MLB debut. In winning, the Yankees edge ahead of the Baltimore Orioles and Boston Red Sox in the American League East by a half-game.
  - The San Diego Padres trade their top 1976 relief pitcher, Butch Metzger, to the St. Louis Cardinals for pitcher John D'Acquisto and infielder Pat Scanlon.
- May 21:
  - At Olympic Stadium, the San Diego Padres and Montreal Expos go 21 innings and five hours and 33 minutes to decide an 11–8 San Diego triumph. The Expos out-hit the Padres, 25 to 13 (including Ellis Valentine's inside-the-park home run), but Merv Rettenmund, the Padres' veteran outfielder, blasts a three-run homer off Jeff Terpko to provide the winning margin.
  - The Expos acquire right-hander Santo Alcala from the Cincinnati Reds for two players to be named later. Pitchers Shane Rawley and Ángel Torres are sent to Cincinnati on May 27 to complete the deal. Then, on May 22, Montreal sends first baseman Mike Jorgensen to the Oakland Athletics for veteran pitcher Stan Bahnsen.
- May 25 – In the second game of a Fenway Park twi-night double-header, centerfielder Lyman Bostock of the Minnesota Twins ties a major league record with 12 putouts, and records 17 putouts over both games, setting an American League record. Minnesota sweeps the twin bill, 13–5 and 9–4, and lashes 35 total base hits.
- May 27 – Mark Fidrych returns from the injured list and pitches a complete game at home for the Detroit Tigers, but loses 2–1 to the Seattle Mariners. The return of "The Bird" draws 44,207 to Tiger Stadium.
- May 28:
  - The San Diego Padres, fourth in the National League West at 20–28 but already 14½ games behind the Los Angeles Dodgers, fire fourth-year manager John McNamara and replace him with veteran skipper Alvin Dark, 55, whose last managing job saw him lead the Oakland Athletics to the 1975 American League West division title.
  - The Seattle Mariners purchase the contract of pitcher Tom House from the Boston Red Sox.
- May 30:
  - At age 22, pitcher Dennis Eckersley fires a no-hitter as the Cleveland Indians top the California Angels 1–0. Eckersley walks one batter and strikes out 12.
  - The New York Mets, floundering at 15–30 and last in the National League East, sack second-year skipper Joe Frazier and replace him with player-manager Joe Torre. A nine-time NL All-Star as a catcher, first baseman and third baseman, Torre, 36, appears in only two more contests as a pinch hitter before removing himself from the active list to focus on managing full-time. His career in the dugout will last 29 seasons, produce four World Series championships (all with the New York Yankees), and earn him a berth in Cooperstown.

=== June ===
- June 1 – Pitcher Jim Bouton is released by the Chicago White Sox without ever appearing in a game for the team.
- June 3 – Leading by two runs in the bottom of the ninth inning, the Baltimore Orioles escape a no-out loaded bases jam when John Wathan hits into a run-scoring triple play to end the game, giving the O's a 7–6 victory over Kansas City at Royals Stadium. Wathan's sacrifice fly to right field is the first out, but it scores Al Cowens from third base; however, Freddie Patek, the runner on first, is caught in a run-down on the throw (out #2) and Dave Nelson, stranded off third base, is tagged out (out #3) by Mark Belanger, completing the 9–6–4–6 triple play.
- June 5 – On Old-Timer's Day, the Los Angeles Dodgers retire the #24 jersey of former manager Walter Alston, who retired in September 1976 after 23 years (which yielded four World Series championships) at the team's helm.
- June 7 – The Chicago White Sox select 2019 Baseball Hall of Fame inductee Harold Baines with the #1 pick in the 1977 MLB draft. White Sox owner Bill Veeck had first seen Baines play Little League ball and has followed his career. Pitcher Bill Gullickson is taken with the second pick by the Montreal Expos, and the Milwaukee Brewers take University of Minnesota infielder Paul Molitor (a 2004 Hall of Fame inductee) with the third pick. Danny Ainge, a potential pro basketball player, is picked in the 15th round by the Toronto Blue Jays.
- June 8:
  - For the fourth time in his career, Nolan Ryan strikes out 19 batters in a game, doing so against the Toronto Blue Jays.
  - For the 14th time in his 17 years as owner of the Kansas City/Oakland Athletics, Charlie Finley changes managers, firing Jack McKeon (26–27) after only 53 games and replacing him with Bobby Winkles. Denuded of talent by free agency, the Athletics were thought to be over-achieving under McKeon but Finley fires him anyway.
  - The Blue Jays purchase the contract of five-time Gold Glove Award-winning third baseman Doug Rader from the San Diego Padres.
- June 9 – Carl Yastrzemski doubles against the Baltimore Orioles—the 500th two-bagger in his Hall-of-Fame career.
- June 12 – Before a crowd of only 10,439 at the Astrodome, the New York Mets beat the Houston Astros 3–1. Tom Seaver picks up the win and goes 7–3 for the season. It would be six years until Seaver again wins a game in a Met uniform.
- June 13 – The California Angels and Baltimore Orioles exchange right-handed relief pitchers, when Dick Drago is sent to the Orioles for Dyar Miller.
- June 15:
  - At the trading deadline, the New York Mets deal future Baseball Hall of Fame pitcher Tom Seaver to the Cincinnati Reds for pitcher Pat Zachry, infielder Doug Flynn and outfielders Steve Henderson and Dan Norman. They then trade infielder Mike Phillips to the St. Louis Cardinals for outfielder Joel Youngblood, and send slugging outfielder Dave Kingman to the San Diego Padres for minor league pitcher Paul Siebert and utilityman Bobby Valentine, who will one day will manage the Mets. The day will forever be known in Mets lore as the "Midnight Massacre".
  - The Milwaukee Brewers send two minor leaguers, pitcher Rick O'Keeffe and infielder Garry Pyka, to the Reds for veteran left-hander Mike Caldwell, 28, who will be a 22-game winner in 1978 and go 102–80 in eight seasons in a Brewer uniform.
  - The Philadelphia Phillies acquire outfielder Bake McBride and pitcher Steve Waterbury from the St. Louis Cardinals in exchange for southpaw Tom Underwood and outfielders Rick Bosetti and Dane Iorg. McBride, 28, is a former National League Rookie of the Year and 1976 All-Star who will be a key member of the Phillies' 1977–1978 National League East champions and 1980 World Series champions.
  - The New York Yankees obtain right-handed power hitter Cliff Johnson from the Houston Astros for pitcher Randy Niemann, infielder Mike Fischlin and a "PTBNL" (first baseman Dave Bergman, added to the deal on November 23, 1977).
- June 16 – The Los Angeles Dodgers purchase the contract of pitcher Bobby Castillo from the Kansas City Royals. Castillo will go on to be known as the pitcher who helped Fernando Valenzuela learn how to throw a screwball.
- June 18:
  - Frank Robinson's term as manager of the Cleveland Indians ends after 2⅓ seasons when he is replaced by coach Jeff Torborg at the team's helm. MLB's first black manager, Robinson has compiled a 186–189 (.496) record: his 1976 Indians had finished a promising 81–78, but the Tribe are only 26–31 (.456) when the change is made.
  - In the sixth inning of an NBC-televised game against the Boston Red Sox at Fenway Park, New York Yankees manager Billy Martin pulls right fielder Reggie Jackson and replaces him with Paul Blair after Jackson misplays Jim Rice's fly ball for a double. As Jackson returns to the dugout, he and Martin exchange words, Martin arguing that Jackson had shown him up by "not hustling" on the play. The Yankees manager lunges at Jackson (who is 18 years younger than Martin and outweighs him by about 40 pounds), and has to be restrained by coaches Yogi Berra and Elston Howard—with the NBC cameras showing the confrontation to the entire country. The Red Sox win, 10–4.
- June 19 – The Red Sox complete a three-game sweep of the New York Yankees at Fenway Park, 11–1 behind Ferguson Jenkins. Boston slugs five home runs, for a total of 16 blasts in the three-game set. They take a 2½-game lead over the Yankees and Baltimore Orioles in the American League East.
- June 20 – On ABC's Monday Night Baseball, the Detroit Tigers' Mark Fidrych beats the Yankees 2–1 at home, allowing 3 hits, no walks, and striking out nine.
- June 21 – Frank Lucchesi is fired as the manager of the Texas Rangers with a 31–31 record following a 9–5 loss to the Minnesota Twins. Lucchesi blames his firing on his spring-training altercation with former Ranger Lenny Randle, and sues Randle for $200,000.
- June 22 – Eddie Stanky replaces Lucchesi as the Rangers' manager. He pilots the Rangers to a 10–8 triumph over the Minnesota Twins at Metropolitan Stadium, and then surprisingly quits his post a mere 18 hours after being hired, one of the shortest tenures in MLB history. Stanky returns to his successful college career as head baseball coach of the University of South Alabama.
- June 24:
  - After hitting what appears to be a three-run homer in the third inning at Metropolitan Stadium, Ralph Garr is called out for passing teammate Jim Essian, who waited at first base to make sure the ball cleared the fence. The umpires award the Chicago White Sox outfielder, known as "Road Runner", a two-run single, but the mistake proves costly when Chicago loses the game in Minnesota, 7–6.
  - In a 6–5 win over the visiting San Francisco Giants, Houston Astros first baseman Bob Watson hits for the cycle.
- June 25 – A group of former Chicago Cubs flatten the Hall of Famers 5–1 in a pregame exhibition. The ex-Cubs include Billy Jurges, Stan Hack, and Ron Santo; the 24 Hall of Famers are one of the greatest collections outside of Cooperstown, as players like Joe DiMaggio, Ralph Kiner and Warren Spahn perform at Wrigley Field for one last time. In the official game, the NL East-leading Cubs score four runs in the ninth to overtake the New York Mets, 5–4, improving their record to 44–22, seven games ahead of the Pittsburgh Pirates.
- June 26:
  - The New York Yankees "flip the script" on the Boston Red Sox by sweeping their rivals in a three-game set at Yankee Stadium. After beating Boston 6–5 (11 innings) Friday and 5–1 (behind Mike Torrez) on Saturday, they finish the sweep today, 5–4, with ace reliever Sparky Lyle gaining his second victory of the series. The Yankees narrow Boston's division lead to two games, and launch the Red Sox on a nine-game losing streak.
  - Pete Vukovich pitches the first shutout in Toronto Blue Jay history, blanking the Baltimore Orioles at Memorial Stadium, 2–0.
  - On Rod Carew Night, the Twins' first baseman goes 4-for-5 en route to scoring five runs and collecting six RBIs in Minnesota's 19–12 victory over the White Sox at Metropolitan Stadium.
- June 27 – The San Francisco Giants' Willie McCovey smashes two home runs in a ten-run sixth inning—one a grand slam off reliever Joe Hoerner—in a 14–9 victory over the Cincinnati Reds. McCovey, 39, becomes the first player in major league history to twice hit two home runs in one inning (his first time occurred on April 12, 1973), and becomes the all-time National League leader with 17 career grand slams. André Dawson, in both 1978 and 1986, will be the next player to hit two homers in the same inning.
- June 28:
  - The Texas Rangers welcome their fourth manager of the 1977 season—former longtime Baltimore Orioles third-base coach Billy Hunter—by dropping a 6–5 decision to the Athletics at the Oakland Coliseum. Hunter succeeds Frank Lucchesi, Eddie Stanky and interim pilot Connie Ryan as manager of the 34–35 Rangers. He will turn their season around by leading them to a 60–33 record and a second-place finish in the American League West.
  - At Olympic Stadium, the Chicago Cubs beat the Montreal Expos 4–2. Rick Reuschel (11–2) is the winning pitcher, while Bruce Sutter picks up his 21st save of the season. The victory represents the high-water mark for the 1977 Cubs with a 47–22 record giving them an 8½-game lead over Pittsburgh.
- June 29:
  - Willie Stargell of the Pittsburgh Pirates hits his 400th career home run when he takes St. Louis Cardinals pitcher Eric Rasmussen deep for a two-run shot in the fifth inning of a 9–1 Pirates' victory at Busch Stadium.
  - Before 51,745 fans at Tiger Stadium, Mark Fidrych fires his sixth straight complete-gate victory of 1977, defeating the Boston Red Sox 7–2. Detroit's star sophomore improves his record to 6–2 (1.83) in 70 innings pitched. But he will be hit hard in his next two starts, then shut down for the season after July 12 with what the Tigers call "tendinitis" in his pitching arm.
- June 30 – Cliff Johnson joins Joe DiMaggio and Joe Pepitone as the only players in Yankees' history to hit two home runs in the same inning. The designated hitter goes deep twice in the eighth as the Bronx Bombers score eight runs in an 11–5 win over the Toronto Blue Jays.

=== July ===
- July 2 – For the second time in 1977, Jim Spencer ties the Chicago White Sox' club record for RBIs in a game set by Shoeless Joe Jackson in 1920, when he knocks in eight runs to help beat the Minnesota Twins at Comiskey Park, 13–8. The Chisox first baseman's two home runs enable Spencer to duplicate a feat he first accomplished May 14 against the Cleveland Indians.
- July 3 – On his 24th birthday, California Angels left-hander Frank Tanana tosses his 14th consecutive complete game with his 6–4 victory over the Oakland Athletics at Anaheim Stadium. Tanana's record after today's game is 12–5 (1.89).
- July 4:
  - At Fenway Park, the Boston Red Sox break a nine-game losing streak by bashing eight home runs in their 9–6 victory over the Toronto Blue Jays. Fred Lynn and George Scott each hit two blasts.
  - Independence Day, the unofficial midpoint of the MLB season, ends with both Chicago teams in first place in their divisions. In the National League East, the Cubs (48–28) hold a four-game lead over the Philadelphia Phillies despite a doubleheader loss to the Montreal Expos at Wrigley Field. In the American League West, the surprising White Sox (45–32) lead the Minnesota Twins by three lengths. The American League East is the tightest race, with the New York Yankees (45–35) one game in front of the Red Sox (42–34) and the Baltimore Orioles (43–36) only 1½ back. The only uncontested division is the National League West, where the Los Angeles Dodgers (54–26) hold a 10½-game bulge over the Cincinnati Reds (42–35).
- July 6 – After going 1,887 MLB at bats without a home run, Chicago Cubs outfielder Greg Gross belts a three-run homer off Montreal's Don Stanhouse, providing the winning runs in an 8–6 Chicago victory.
- July 9 – New York Mets third baseman Lenny Randle ends an extra innings marathon with the Expos at Shea Stadium in the 17th inning with a walk off home run off Will McEnaney.
- July 10 – The California Angels fire manager Norm Sherry and name coach Dave Garcia to replace him for the remainder of 1977. After a winter of high expectations—fed by the signings of marquee free agents Don Baylor, Bobby Grich and Joe Rudi—the Angels are only 39–42 (.481) and 9½ games out of first place in the American League West under Sherry.
- July 13:
  - Jim Rice slugs two homers and Butch Hobson contributes a three-rub bomb in the tenth inning, enabling the Boston Red Sox to hold onto their half-game lead in the American League East by beating the home-standing Cleveland Indians, 9–7.
  - The New York Mets trail the Chicago Cubs 2–1 in the sixth inning at Shea Stadium when the lights go out as New York City is stricken with a blackout that would last two days. The game will be resumed on September 16, with the Cubs winning 5–2.
- July 14 – Jim Wynn, aka the "Toy Cannon", is released by the New York Yankees. On July 26, the 5 ft 10 in (1.78 m) home run hitter will sign with the Milwaukee Brewers, where he finishes his MLB career.
- July 19 – In the All-Star Game at Yankee Stadium, the National League defeats the American League for the 14th time in the last 15 encounters. Don Sutton of the Los Angeles Dodgers is named MVP.
- July 21 – Sixteen years and two days removed from his MLB debut, Al Downing, best remembered as the pitcher who gave up Hank Aaron's record breaking home run, is released by the Los Angeles Dodgers, ending his MLB career.
- July 23 – Gaylord Perry and Adrian Devine combine for a 13-inning, five-hit shutout and Mike Hargrove gets the game-winning hit, an RBI single, enabling the Texas Rangers to edge the Baltimore Orioles 1–0 at Memorial Stadium. The matchup of Hall-of-Fame starting pitchers sees Jim Palmer work 11 shutout innings without gaining a decision.
- July 24 – At Dodger Stadium, New York Mets outfielder Bruce Boisclair drops Davey Lopes' two-out, ninth-inning foul pop up. Lopes then responds with a game-ending three-run home run off Bob Apodaca to give the Dodgers a 5–3 win and spoil the day for Nino Espinosa, who left the game needing just one more out for a complete-game victory.
- July 25 – Pete Rose becomes the all-time hit leader among switch-hitters when he collects his 2,881st career safety, a fourth-inning single off Pete Falcone in the Cincinnati Reds' 9–8 loss to the St. Louis Cardinals at Busch Memorial Stadium. Ex-Cardinal (and New York Giant) Frankie Frisch had established the record on August 4, 1937.
- July 28 – Just two days after pitching a complete game, 3–0 five-hit shutout for the Chicago Cubs against the Cincinnati Reds, Rick Reuschel enters the 13th inning in relief of a 15–15 tie game with the Reds at Wrigley Field. Reuschel retires two batters to end the Reds' half-inning, then leads off the bottom of the 13th with a single and scores the winning run on an RBI single by Dave Rosello. The two teams combine for 11 home runs; the Cubs' six homers include two each from Bill Buckner and George Mitterwald.

=== August ===
- August 1 – Willie McCovey extends his own National League record when he hits his 18th career grand slam in the third inning of the Giants' 9–2 victory over Montreal.
- August 4 – For the first time since 1906, both Chicago teams are in first place this late in a season. The faltering Cubs, who had a 47–22 record on June 28, are now 61–43 and only a half-game in front of the Philadelphia Phillies in the National League East; they will skid to a mediocre 81–81 record. The White Sox, who defeat the Texas Rangers 5–4 today, are 63–41 and 3½ lengths ahead of the Minnesota Twins in the American League West; they will win 90 games, but be overwhelmed by the runaway divisional winner Kansas City Royals on August 20.
- August 5:
  - The Phillies defeat the Los Angeles Dodgers 8–3 at Veterans Stadium, while the Cubs fall to the visiting San Diego Padres 11–8. The victory powers Philadelphia into first place in their division, ending the Cubbies' stranglehold on the top spot. Moreover, it represents the third victory of the Phillies' 13-game winning skein that will see them 4½ games in front of the Pittsburgh Pirates (and seven lengths ahead of the Cubs) by August 16.
  - Kansas City Royals designated hitter John Mayberry hits for the cycle in a 12–2 win over the visiting Chicago White Sox.
- August 7 – In the second game of a doubleheader at Wrigley Field, Mick Kelleher of the Cubs and Dave Kingman of the Padres are involved in a bench-clearing brawl—a melee with a rare mismatch between the two major combatants. The 6 ft 6 in (1.98 m), 210 lb (95 kg) Kingman, angered over being hit by a Steve Renko pitch leading off the second inning, slides hard into Kelleher, the Cubs' 5 ft 9 in (1.75 m), 170 lb (77 kg) second baseman, on George Hendrick's ground ball one batter later. Kelleher responds by jumping onto Kingman's back and pummeling him with blows. Both Kelleher and Kingman are ejected from the game, which the Cubs win 9–4.
- August 9 – Doug Capilla and Pedro Borbón combine on a one-hitter, and the visiting Cincinnati Reds defeat the National League West front-runners, the Los Angeles Dodgers, 4–0. Ron Cey's seventh-inning single is the Dodgers' only safety.
- August 10 – The Pittsburgh Pirates and Chicago Cubs take 18 innings to settle matters at Three Rivers Stadium, with Pirates emerging victorious 2–1 on Ed Ott's pinch-hit sacrifice fly. Paul Reuschel excels for the Cubs with six innings of three-hit, shutout relief, while the Pirates' Goose Gossage and Grant Jackson each allow only one hit, as they combine for nine scoreless frames.
- August 12:
  - For the second consecutive day, Manny Sanguillén of the Oakland Athletics foils a no-hit bid with a single hit off the Baltimore Orioles' Jim Palmer, who settles for a two-hit 6–0 victory. Yesterday's hit was off the New York Yankees' Mike Torrez, who finished with a 3–0 two-hitter.
  - The Cleveland Indians' Dennis Eckersley one-hits the Milwaukee Brewers at Municipal Stadium 2–0. Cecil Cooper's sixth-inning triple keeps Eckersley from recording his second no-hitter of 1977; he had tossed a no-no against the California Angels on May 30.
  - At Wrigley Field, the first-place Philadelphia Phillies begin a devastating four-game sweep of their closest pursuers, the Chicago Cubs, with a 10–3 trouncing of the home side. Steve Carlton (17–6) defeats Rick Reuschel (15–5); the Hall-of-Fame southpaw smashes a home run, and battery-mate Tim McCarver clouts two, to help Carlton's cause. By the time the Phillies leave town after an August 14 doubleheader, they've pushed the Cubs all the way to third place in the National League East.
  - In a game against the New York Mets, the Pittsburgh Pirates' Ed Ott slides hard into the Mets' Felix Millan at second base attempting to break up a double play. Millan responds by punching Ott in the jaw with a baseball in his hand, after which Ott lifts up Millan and body-slams him into his extended knee and severely injures Millan's shoulder. Millan misses the remainder of the season and is forced to retire from baseball.
- August 16 – The streaky Boston Red Sox, known for shaky pitching and home-run power, win their 16th game in their last 17 contests, 5–3 at Fenway Park over the Kansas City Royals. The hot streak, which began July 28, has featured unusually strong performances by Red Sox pitchers, who have held opponents to two runs or fewer in ten of the 17 games. At 70–44, Boston now leads the American League East by 3½ games over the Baltimore Orioles, with the New York Yankees only 4½ back.
- August 17:
  - With a 5–3 road victory over the Cleveland Indians, the Royals embark on a torrid streak of their own. They will win 31 of their next 35 games, and rocket from fourth place in the American League West (64–51) to a 10½-game lead (99–55) by September 25, with a division championship clinched along the way.
  - Records fall as the Mexican League concludes its season. Ironman reliever Aurelio López of the Mexico City Reds racks up his 30th save to go with a record 19 victories in relief. Veteran Tampico first baseman Héctor Espino hits 14 home runs, raising his career total to 435, a new minor league record. Thirty-eight-year-old Vic Davalillo, the league's top hitter with a .384 batting average, is purchased by the Los Angeles Dodgers.
- August 18 – Amateur free-agent left-hander Kevin Hickey signs a Chicago White Sox contract after being invited to attend an open tryout by a White Sox employee who saw Hickey pitch in a local recreational softball league. He is the only one of 250 men at the camp to leave with a contract. Hickey will appear in 231 MLB games between 1981 and 1991.
- August 20 – The Kansas City Royals defeat the Boston Red Sox 5–2. Coupled with losses by the Chicago White Sox, Texas Rangers and Minnesota Twins, the Royals gain sole possession of first place in the American League West for the first time in 1977, and don't relinquish it for the rest of the season. The Red Sox, meanwhile, have fallen into another losing funk, with their 2–9 stretch between August 17 and 26 costing them the American League East lead.
- August 21 – In front of 46,265 fans at Shea Stadium, Tom Seaver takes the mound against the New York Mets for the first time in his career. His Cincinnati Reds defeat the Mets 5–1.
- August 23:
  - The reeling Boston Red Sox are one-hit by the Minnesota Twins' Dave Goltz at Metropolitan Stadium. Jim Rice's fourth-inning single is the Red Sox's only safety. The defeat is Boston's fifth straight.
  - The New York Yankees defeat the Chicago White Sox 8–3 at Comiskey Park. Coupled with the Red Sox' loss to the Twins, the Yankees move into first place for the first time since July 9. Moreover, Billy Martin's Bombers (now 73–51) are in the midst of a month-long 28–5 torrid stretch and will remain atop the American League East for the remainder of the season.
- August 27 – Against the New York Yankees, the Texas Rangers' Toby Harrah and Bump Wills become the first players in Major League history to hit back-to-back inside-the-park home runs.
- August 28 – The Padres place Dave Kingman on waivers.
- August 29:
  - St. Louis Cardinals outfielder Lou Brock steals two bases in a 4–3 loss to the San Diego Padres. It is the 893rd career stolen base for Brock, breaking Ty Cobb's modern record.
  - Duane Kuiper hits his first and only career home run. He currently holds the live-ball era record for the most career at-bats with exactly one home run.
- August 31:
  - Hank Aaron's major league mark of 755 career home runs is tied by Sadaharu Oh in Japan. Three days later, Oh will hit his 756th homer to surpass Aaron's total, becoming the most prolific home run hitter in professional baseball history.
  - Still harboring playoff hopes, the Chicago White Sox reacquire veteran reliever Clay Carroll from the St. Louis Cardinals for three "players to be named later:" pitchers Dave Hamilton and Silvio Martínez and outfielder Nyls Nyman. The ChiSox had sent Carroll to St. Louis in March 1977, and he enjoyed a good season coming out of the Redbird bullpen. However, he's treated rudely by American League hitters, winning but one game and saving another in eight September appearances.
  - The Los Angeles Dodgers acquire veteran catcher Jerry Grote from the New York Mets for two minor-league players to named later. To make room for Grote, they release first baseman/pinch-hitter Boog Powell.

=== September ===
- September 3 – Sadaharu Oh surpasses Hank Aaron's world record for home runs when he hits homer #756.
- September 5 – Labor Day action concludes with three of MLB's four divisions still up for grabs. In the American League East, the New York Yankees lead the Boston Red Sox by 2½ games and the Baltimore Orioles by four, while the red-hot Kansas City Royals have moved 5½ in front of the Chicago White Sox in the American League West. The National League standings are somewhat more clear-cut, with the Philadelphia Phillies seven games ahead of the Pittsburgh Pirates in the East and the Los Angeles Dodgers holding a 10½-game advantage over the Cincinnati Reds in the West.
- September 6 – Dave Kingman is claimed off waivers by the California Angels, making them his third team played for in 1977.
- September 7 – Jim Dwyer is released by the Chicago Cubs.
- September 8 – Pitching in relief of Ray Burris and Paul Reuschel against the Montreal Expos at Wrigley Field, Chicago Cubs bullpen ace Bruce Sutter strikes out the first six batters he faces. Entering a 2–2 tie game in the top of the eighth, he fans Warren Cromartie, André Dawson and Tony Pérez. Then, in the ninth, he registers the 23rd "immaculate inning"—three hitters faced, three strikeouts, nine pitches (and nine strikes) thrown—since 1900, whiffing Ellis Valentine, Gary Carter and Larry Parrish. Future Hall-of-Famer Sutter faces three fellow Cooperstown enshrinees (Dawson, Pérez, Carter) across those six hitters. His strikeout skein ends in the tenth inning, but he throws another shutout frame, then wins his sixth game of 1977 (against one loss), when the Cubs push over a run in home half of the tenth.
- September 9:
  - In the second game of a double header in Boston, the Detroit Tigers debut their new second baseman, Lou Whitaker, and their new shortstop, Alan Trammell. They will play side by side for 19 years to establish a new Major League record for tandem play at those positions.
  - The Cleveland Indians trade former all-star catcher Ray Fosse to the Seattle Mariners for journeyman pitcher Bill Laxton and cash considerations.
- September 10 – Roy Howell hits two home runs, two doubles, and a single, and drives in nine runs, as the Toronto Blue Jays beat the New York Yankees 19–3.
- September 14 – At age 38, pitcher Jim Bouton earns a 4–1 win for the Atlanta Braves over the San Francisco Giants. It is his first MLB victory since July 10, 1970, and the last win of his big-league career. A member of the 1962 world champion New York Yankees and an All-Star in 1963, Bouton had retired midway through the 1970 season, the year his famous "tell-all" memoir, Ball Four, was published.
- September 15:
  - Dave Kingman is traded by the California Angels to the New York Yankees for pitcher Randy Stein. Having also played with the New York Mets and San Diego Padres earlier in the season, Kingman becomes the first—and only—Major League Baseball player to play in all four divisions in one season. Kingman will hit four home runs in his two weeks with the Yankees but is ineligible for the postseason.
  - In the bottom of the fifth inning at Toronto's Exhibition Stadium, manager Earl Weaver pulls his Baltimore Orioles from the field, citing "hazardous conditions" caused by a small tarp weighed down by bricks that covers a bullpen mound along the left-field foul line. After a 20-minute argument between Weaver and umpiring crew chief Marty Springstead fails to resolve the issue, the Orioles forfeit the game. Weaver's club already trail the Blue Jays, 4–0, when the game is halted.
- September 16 – The Seattle Mariners defeat the Kansas City Royals 4–1, snapping the Royals' 16-game winning streak.
- September 17 – Yankees DH Dave Kingman, with a third-inning round-tripper off Detroit's Jim Crawford at Tiger Stadium, becomes the first player to homer for four different teams in one season. The much-traveled veteran will hit a total of 26 home runs in 1977 playing for the Mets (9), Padres (11), Angels (2), and the Yankees (4).
- September 18 – With 51,798 on hand, the Baltimore Orioles salute future Hall-of-Famer Brooks Robinson with a day in his honor at Memorial Stadium. The 40-year-old, 18-time All-Star and 16x Gold Glove Award-winning third baseman appeared in his last official MLB game August 13 when he was announced as a pinch hitter for Al Bumbry; it was his 2,896th game as an Oriole dating to 1955. He went on the voluntarily retired list eight days later.
- September 19 – In his second MLB game, rookie call-up Ted Cox of the Boston Red Sox singles in his first two at bats, tying and breaking Cecil Travis' 1933 record of five hits in five at bats at the start of a career. Cox' first seven plate appearances have produced six hits, with a base on balls mixed in, before he is finally retired in his eighth appearance by Ed Figueroa of the New York Yankees.
- September 20:
  - After second-place 1975 and 1976 seasons, the Los Angeles Dodgers clinch the National League West title by beating the San Francisco Giants, 3–1.
  - Former longtime Dodger executive Buzzie Bavasi steps down as president of the San Diego Padres after almost a decade as the head of the club's front office. Bavasi quits because of growing differences with owners Ray and Joan Kroc.
- September 22 – Bert Blyleven fires a 6–0 no-hitter for the Texas Rangers against the California Angels at Anaheim Stadium.
- September 23 – George Foster blasts his 50th home run of the season off Atlanta's Buzz Capra, becoming the first major leaguer with a 50-HR season since Willie Mays in 1965.
- September 24 – Second baseman Jack Brohamer of the Chicago White Sox becomes the third man of the season to hit for the cycle, accomplishing the feat in an 8–3 win over the Seattle Mariners at the Kingdome.
- September 25:
  - The New York Yankees continue their march to the 1977 American League East championship by shutting out the Toronto Blue Jays in both games of an Exhibition Stadium double-header, 15–0 and 2–0. Ron Guidry and Ed Figueroa each win their 16th games of the season. The Yanks' magic number is now four.
  - California Angels pitcher Nolan Ryan notches his 341st strikeout of the season, the fifth highest single season total in American League history. Ryan set the American League single-season record four years earlier when he struck out 383 batters in 1973.
- September 27 – At Chicago's Wrigley Field, the Philadelphia Phillies beat the Cubs 15–9 to clinch their second straight National League East title. Starting pitcher Larry Christenson wins his 18th game, slugs his third home run of 1977, and drives in five Phillies runs to advance his own cause.
- September 29:
  - Jean R. Yawkey, who inherited the Boston Red Sox from her late husband, Tom, upon the longtime owner's death in July 1976, announces she is selling the team to a consortium headed by Haywood Sullivan, a former Red Sox catcher now a club vice-president, and Buddy LeRoux, its former (1966–1974) athletic trainer turned real-estate mogul, for $15 million. Sullivan is known to be a close personal friend of the Yawkeys. The announcement immediately draws criticism from observers who say the Sullivan-LeRoux bid is not the highest among those submitted by other prospective owners; in addition, concerns are voiced that the Red Sox will not be able to compete with deep-pocketed owners in the new world of baseball free agency.
  - With a 6–3 victory over the visiting California Angels, the Kansas City Royals reach the 100-win mark for the first time in the nine-year history of the franchise. The runaway American League Western Division champions will finish with 102 regular-season victories.
  - Tony LaRussa, 32, is released by the St. Louis Cardinals after playing for the Triple-A New Orleans Pelicans of the American Association, ending his 16-year playing career. But during the off-season LaRussa will be hired to manage the Chicago White Sox' Double-A Knoxville farm club, and by August 3, 1979, at 34, he will be named pilot of the White Sox themselves—beginning a 35-year, Hall-of-Fame career.
- September 30 – Lou Brock of the St. Louis Cardinals steals the 900th base of his career in a 7–2 win over the New York Mets at Busch Stadium, becoming just the second man in baseball history to reach the plateau.

=== October ===
- October 1 – Despite a 10–7 loss to the Detroit Tigers, the New York Yankees clinch their second straight AL Eastern Division title when the Boston Red Sox are beaten 8–7 by the Baltimore Orioles.
- October 2 – Dusty Baker of the Los Angeles Dodgers hits his 30th home run of the season off J.R. Richard of the Houston Astros. Baker joins Steve Garvey, Reggie Smith and Ron Cey as the other Dodgers with over 30 home runs that season, thus making the Dodgers the first team in MLB history to have four players hit over 30 home runs.
- October 5 – Glenn Burke greets Dusty Baker on the dugout steps to congratulate his Dodger teammate for hitting a grand slam against the Phillies in Game 2 of the 1977 NLCS. The greeting, which consists of the players extending their right arms above their heads and slapping their hands to make a resounding clap, is considered to be the first "high five" in baseball history.
- October 7 – In Game 3 of the National League Championship Series at Philadelphia's Veterans Stadium, the Los Angeles Dodgers trail the Phillies 5–3 with two outs in the ninth inning—but the Dodgers catch lightning in a bottle and turn the tide of the series. Pinch-hitter Vic Davalillo beats out a two-strike drag bunt and scores when pinch-hitter Manny Mota follows with a long double off Greg Luzinski's glove. Mota reaches third on a throw that Ted Sizemore mishandles. Davey Lopes' grounder hits a seam in the carpet and caroms off Mike Schmidt's knee to Larry Bowa, and the shortstop's throw is ruled late although television replays and a scene from a 1977 highlight film show that Lopes was out. Mota scores to tie the game, 5–5. The Dodgers then pull out a 6–5 victory when Bill Russell singles home Lopes after Lopes advanced to second on a wild pickoff throw by Gene Garber.
- October 8 – In Game 4 of the NLCS, Tommy John of the Los Angeles Dodgers outduels Steve Carlton of the Philadelphia Phillies for a 4–1 win and the 1977 National League pennant.
- October 9 – The visiting New York Yankees win the deciding fifth game of the 1977 American League Championship Series, overcoming a 3–1 score by plating four runs in the eighth and ninth innings to defeat the Kansas City Royals 5–3. Mike Torrez throws 5⅓ shutout innings of middle relief and Willie Randolph's sacrifice fly drives in the decisive, pennant-winning run.
- October 18 – In Game 6 of the World Series, Reggie Jackson hits three home runs in three swings to lead the New York Yankees to an 8–4, Series-clinching victory. With five homers in the 1977 Fall Classic's six games, Jackson sets a new record, and he is elected World Series MVP. The World Series title is the Yankees' first since 1962 and their 21st overall.
- October 20:
  - Owner Gene Autry announces a major shake-up of the California Angels' front office. Autry takes over as club president from longtime administrator and ex-sportswriter Arthur "Red" Patterson, and hires Buzzie Bavasi, 63, former general manager of the Brooklyn/Los Angeles Dodgers and president of the San Diego Padres, as his executive vice president and top advisor.
  - Ron Blomberg of the Yankees, the American League's first-ever designated hitter, and southpaw reliever Terry Forster of the Pittsburgh Pirates are among a dozen MLB players who are granted free agency.
- October 24 – Boston Red Sox owner Jean R. Yawkey fires two-time The Sporting News Executive of the Year Dick O'Connell and his top lieutenants to clear the way for Haywood Sullivan, named general manager, and Buddy LeRoux, named executive vice president/administration. Sullivan and LeRoux are the general partners of a new ownership group expected to take control of the team in the coming days.
- October 25:
  - Earl Weaver of the Baltimore Orioles is named Associated Press American League Manager of the Year by a landslide vote. Weaver receives 248 first place votes. Whitey Herzog of the Kansas City Royals is second and Bob Lemon of the Chicago White Sox finishes third.
  - The Chicago Cubs deal veteran outfielder José Cardenal to the Philadelphia Phillies for pitcher Manny Seoane.
- October 26 – The St. Louis Cardinals purchase the contract of pitcher Aurelio López from the Mexico City Reds of the Mexican League.
- October 27 – Calvin Griffith, owner of the Minnesota Twins, rejects manager Gene Mauch's request to resign and take a job as manager with the California Angels. Griffith informs Mauch and Angels owner Gene Autry that Mauch, a Southern California resident, is under contract to the Twins for three more years. Dave Garcia remains at the Angels' helm going into 1978.
- October 28 – The Pittsburgh Pirates' highly coveted fireballing relief pitcher, Goose Gossage, is one of three players granted free agency as MLB weathers the second off-season of the post-reserve clause era. Gossage, 26, went 11–9 with 26 saves and a 1.62 earned run average in 72 games in 1977, fanning 151 hitters in 133 innings pitched. The other players set loose today are outfielder Oscar Gamble and pitcher Tom Griffin.
- October 31 – Mike Torrez, the New York Yankees' premier post-season starting pitcher, is granted free agency. Torrez, 31, threw two complete-game victories in the Bombers' recently completed World Series triumph against the Los Angeles Dodgers.

=== November ===
- November 2:
  - Twenty-two players, including Lyman Bostock, Tom Burgmeier, Larry Hisle, Dave Kingman, Doc Medich and Richie Zisk, are granted free agency.
  - Future Hall-of-Famer Steve Carlton wins his second National League Cy Young Award. His 23 wins helped the Philadelphia Phillies reach the postseason for a second straight year for the first time in the 95-year-old franchise's history.
- November 9:
  - George Foster of the Cincinnati Reds wins the 1977 National League Most Valuable Player Award after his spectacular 52-homer, 149-RBI season. Greg Luzinski of the Phillies finishes second and Dave Parker of the Pittsburgh Pirates places third.
  - The Texas Rangers sign free-agent former Chicago White Sox slugger Richie Zisk, 28, to a ten-year, $2.75 million contract.
- November 11 – The Rangers sign free-agent pitcher Doc Medich, most recently with the New York Mets.
- November 16 – Rod Carew of the Minnesota Twins easily beats Al Cowens of the Kansas City Royals and Ken Singleton of the Baltimore Orioles to win the 1977 American League MVP Award.
- November 17:
  - The Milwaukee Brewers sign free-agent former Minnesota Twins outfielder Larry Hisle to a six-year, $3.2 million contract. Hisle, a 1977 All-Star, is the reigning RBI champ of the American League, and his slugging will help lift the 1978 Brewers to the first over-.500 season in franchise history.
  - Chicago White Sox owner Bill Veeck signs free-agent former New York Yankees designated hitter Ron Blomberg to a four-year contract worth over $600,000. Due to shoulder and knee injuries, Blomberg has appeared in only 35 professional games since 1974 and did not play at all in 1977. Veeck's gamble fails as Blomberg bats only .231 in 169 plate appearances for the Pale Hose in 1978.
- November 20:
  - Harry Dalton resigns as general manager of California Angels and takes a similar position with the Milwaukee Brewers, replacing Jim Baumer. Although his six-year term with the Angels produced disappointing results, Dalton, 49, is known as a major architect of the Baltimore Orioles' American League and American League East dynasty. In Milwaukee, Dalton will build the underperforming Brewers into a contending team in the AL East beginning in 1978.
  - The Brewers also fire manager Alex Grammas, who compiled a 133–190 (.412) record over two full seasons as the club's skipper.
  - Buzzie Bavasi, whose October appointment to the Angels' front office as executive vice president crowded out Dalton, becomes the Angels' new general manager.
- November 21:
  - The Baltimore Orioles' Eddie Murray (161 games played, 173 hits, 27 home runs, 88 RBI, .283 batting average, .803 OPS) is chosen as the 1977 AL Rookie of the Year. Murray will go on to play 21 MLB seasons, amass 3,255 hits, slug 504 homers, make eight All-Star squads, win three Gold Glove Awards as a first baseman and three Silver Slugger Awards, earn a 1983 World Series ring, and become a first-ballot Hall of Famer in 2003.
  - On the eve of Lyman Bostock's 27th birthday, the California Angels sign the free-agent former Minnesota Twins outfielder to a $2.3 million, six-year contract. Ten months later, Bostock will be killed in a tragic accidental shooting, a victim of mistaken identity.
  - Free-agent relief pitcher Dick Drago returns to the Red Sox after a two-year absence when he reportedly signs a multi-year $300,000 contract. Drago had spent 1976–1977 with the Angels and Orioles. Although Drago's signing is reported to the press today, Baseball Reference and Retrosheet record the transaction as being completed on December 27.
- November 22:
  - Andre Dawson of the Montreal Expos wins the National League Rookie of the Year Award by one vote over Steve Henderson of the New York Mets. Dawson hit .282 with 19 home runs and 65 RBI, compared to Henderson's .297 average, 12 homers and 65 RBI. History will validate Dawson's triumph when he is elected to the Baseball Hall of Fame in 2010 after eight All-Star selections, eight Gold Glove Awards, the 1987 National League Most Valuable Player Award, and four Silver Slugger Awards.
  - The Atlanta Braves hire Bobby Cox as their manager for 1978, replacing Dave Bristol, who was fired October 25. Former third baseman Cox, 36, was a highly successful manager in the New York Yankees' system from 1971 to 1976 and won a World Series ring as the Yanks' 1977 first-base coach. Although Cox' first term (1978–1981) as the Braves' pilot will produce only one above-.500 season, he will return to Atlanta in 1986, first as general manager, where he will help build one of the most talented organizations in baseball. Then, on June 23, 1990, he'll begin a second term as the Braves' field manager through 2010, a 21-year run that will see him win 14 division titles, five National League pennants, and the 1995 World Series. He will be elected to the Hall of Fame in 2014 after 2,504 victories accumulated over 29 years—a quarter-century with the Braves, plus four seasons (1982–1985) at the helm of the Toronto Blue Jays.
  - The New York Yankees sign free-agent former Pittsburgh Pirates fireballer Goose Gossage to a six-year, $2.75 million contract. Gossage will lead the American League in saves twice, and win a 1978 World Series ring, in The Bronx over the next six seasons.
  - The Los Angeles Dodgers sign Gossage's former teammate with the Chicago White Sox and Pittsburgh Pirates, free-agent left-handed reliever Terry Forster, to a five-year, $900,000 contract.
- November 23 – The Boston Red Sox sign right-handed starting pitcher Mike Torrez, a free agent formerly with the arch-rival New York Yankees, to a seven-year, $2.5 million contract. In addition to his two complete-game victories in the 1977 World Series, Torrez had won 14 games (losing 12) for the Bombers in 1977.
- November 29 – The San Diego Padres sign free-agent former Chicago White Sox outfielder Oscar Gamble to a six-year $2.85 million contract. Gamble had hit 31 home runs for the contending 1977 ChiSox, and their failure to retain him and fellow slugger Richie Zisk (30 homers) will be keenly felt in 1978.
- November 30:
  - Free-agent power hitter Dave Kingman signs with the Chicago Cubs, making the Cubs the fifth franchise he was a part of during the calendar year. Kingman had started the season with the Mets, then was traded to the Padres, who later released him. He signed with the Angels, played there for a week, and was traded to the Yankees, where he finished the season before being granted free agency.
  - The Boston Red Sox sign free-agent Chicago White Sox utility infielder Jack Brohamer.

=== December ===
- December 1:
  - Gabe Paul, a key member of George Steinbrenner's ownership group since it bought the New York Yankees in 1973—and the Bombers' club president and general manager since the autumn of that year—announces his resignation from both posts, effective January 1, 1978. Paul, 67, will return to the Cleveland Indians as president and minority owner in a new ownership syndicate headed by former Yankees' limited partner Francis "Steve" O'Neill.
  - The Yankees concurrently announce that Al Rosen, 53, former All-Star Indians third baseman, and vice president Cedric Tallis, 63, former GM of the Kansas City Royals, will assume Paul's duties.
- December 5:
  - The Toronto Blue Jays select first baseman Willie Upshaw from the Yankees and the Milwaukee Brewers select catcher Ned Yost from the New York Mets in the 1977 Rule 5 draft.
  - The California Angels trade pitcher Richard Dotson and outfielders Bobby Bonds and Thad Bosley to the Chicago White Sox in exchange for pitchers Chris Knapp and Dave Frost and catcher/outfielder Brian Downing.
- December 6 – The Blue Jays trade pitcher Pete Vuckovich and a "PTBNL" (outfielder John Scott) to the St. Louis Cardinals for pitchers Tom Underwood and Víctor Cruz.
- December 7:
  - The Atlanta Braves sell the contract of pitcher Andy Messersmith to the New York Yankees. Messersmith, 32, who helped usher in free agency with his 1975 arbitration case, has gone 16–15 (3.49) in 45 games since signing a lucrative deal with the Braves in April 1976.
  - The Baltimore Orioles acquire pitchers Joe Kerrigan and Don Stanhouse and outfielder Gary Roenicke from the Montreal Expos for pitchers Rudy May, Randy Miller and Bryn Smith.
  - The Seattle Mariners trade pitcher Tommy Moore and outfielder Carlos López to the Orioles for pitcher Mike Parrott.
- December 8:
  - The Atlanta Braves, New York Mets, Texas Rangers and Pittsburgh Pirates pull off an unusual four-team, interleague trade. The Braves send first baseman Willie Montañez to the Mets. Then, the Rangers deal pitchers Adrian Devine and Tommy Boggs and outfielder Eddie Miller to the Braves; outfielder Tom Grieve and a "PTBNL" (outfielder Ken Henderson) to the Mets; and future Hall-of-Fame starting pitcher Bert Blyleven to the Pirates. In turn, Pittsburgh sends outfielder Al Oliver and infielder Nelson Norman to the Rangers, while the Mets trade pitcher Jon Matlack to the Rangers and first baseman John Milner to the Pirates.
  - The St. Louis Cardinals deal southpaw reliever Al Hrabosky—known to fans as "The Mad Hungarian"—to the cross-state Kansas City Royals for pitcher Mark Littell and catcher Buck Martínez. They then send Martínez to the Milwaukee Brewers for pitcher George Frazier.
  - American League owners vote 11–3 to reject the September 29 sale of the Boston Red Sox to a group led by Haywood Sullivan and Buddy LeRoux for $15 million, after a lawsuit reveals that the two principals have managed to acquire 52 percent of the team while investing only $200,000 of their own. Jean R. Yawkey remains as owner, with Sullivan and LeRoux running the Red Sox's front office while they rework the finances of their purchase offer.
  - The Red Sox make on-field news, acquiring 25-year-old second baseman Jerry Remy from the California Angels for pitcher Don Aase.
  - The Chicago Cubs trade catcher Steve Swisher, outfielder Jerry Morales and cash to the Cardinals for catcher Dave Rader and outfielder Héctor Cruz.
  - Veteran first baseman/outfielder Ron Fairly, a former USC Trojan baseball player and longtime member of the Los Angeles Dodgers, returns to Southern California when the Angels acquire him from the Toronto Blue Jays for catcher Pat Kelly and third baseman/outfielder Butch Alberts.
- December 9:
  - Oakland Athletics' owner/GM Charlie Finley announces that he has traded ace left-hander Vida Blue to the Cincinnati Reds for first base prospect Dave Revering and $1.75 million in cash. The deal will be voided on January 30, 1978, by Commissioner of Baseball Bowie Kuhn, who tells Finley to restructure the trade.
  - The Reds are successful in another transaction, however, when they acquire speedy outfielder Dave Collins from the Seattle Mariners for pitcher Shane Rawley. Collins will steal 79 bases for the 1980 Reds.
  - The Milwaukee Brewers obtain outfielder Ben Oglivie from the Detroit Tigers for pitchers Rich Folkers and Jim Slaton. Oglivie, 28, will spend nine years—the remainder of his MLB career—with Milwaukee, put up home run totals of 29 (1979), 41 (1980) and 34 (1982), and make three American League All-Star teams.
  - The New York Yankees add another bullpen piece in free-agent right-hander Rawly Eastwick, most recently a member of the St. Louis Cardinals.
- December 12 – The Yankees pick up veteran first baseman Jim Spencer from the Chicago White Sox, along with outfielder Tommy Cruz and minor-league hurler Bob Polinsky, in exchange for pitchers Stan Thomas and Ed Ricks and cash considerations.
- December 14 – In one of the worst trades in team history, the Boston Red Sox deal veteran pitcher Ferguson Jenkins, a future Hall of Famer, to the Texas Rangers for obscure left-hander John Poloni. Jenkins, who has clashed with Boston manager Don Zimmer, returns to the Rangers, where he will win 34 games combined in 1978 and 1979; Poloni never pitches a game for the Red Sox, who lose the 1978 AL East title in a one-game playoff to the Yankees.
- December 20 – The Seattle Mariners sign free-agent former Cleveland Indians first baseman/outfielder Bruce Bochte, a future All-Star.
- December 21:
  - The Montreal Expos sign free-agent former Baltimore Orioles left-hander Ross Grimsley, who will win 20 games for the 1978 Expos.
  - The California Angels sign free-agent former Boston Red Sox outfielder Rick Miller.

== Movies ==
- The Bad News Bears in Breaking Training
- Murder at the World Series TV movie

== Births ==
=== January ===
- January 2:
  - Hansel Izquierdo
  - Scott Proctor
- January 3:
  - A. J. Burnett
  - Mike Crudale
  - Zach Sorensen
- January 4:
  - Brian O'Connor
  - Walter Silva
- January 5 – Eric Junge
- January 8 – Dave Matranga
- January 10 – Rick Bauer
- January 12 – Reggie Taylor
- January 16 – Colter Bean
- January 17 – Rob Bell
- January 18 – Franklin Núñez
- January 22 – Aaron Rakers
- January 23 – Jason Stanford
- January 28:
  - Bob File
  - Lyle Overbay
- January 30:
  - Takahiro Arai
  - John Lindsey

=== February ===
- February 2 – Adam Everett
- February 5:
  - Javier Martínez
  - Abraham Núñez
- February 6 – Pete Zoccolillo
- February 7 – Dave Borkowski
- February 9 – Napoleón Calzado
- February 12 – Gary Knotts
- February 13 – Joe Lawrence
- February 15 – Álex González
- February 17 – Juan Padilla
- February 21 – Chad Hutchinson
- February 22 – J. J. Putz
- February 24 – Bronson Arroyo
- February 26:
  - Mike Muchlinski
  - Josh Towers
- February 27 – Craig Monroe

=== March ===
- March 2 – Jay Gibbons
- March 5 – Mike MacDougal
- March 6 – Marcus Thames
- March 9 – Justin Leone
- March 10:
  - Ben Davis
  - Tike Redman
- March 17 – Robb Quinlan
- March 18:
  - Fernando Rodney
  - Terrmel Sledge
- March 19 – David Ross
- March 20 – Joe Fontenot
- March 25 – Brett Jodie
- March 27 – Nate Rolison
- March 30 – Jeriome Robertson
- March 31 – Jamie Brown

=== April ===
- April 2 – Mike Gallo
- April 4 – Eric Valent
- April 5 – Winston Abreu
- April 6:
  - Andy Phillips
  - Barry Wesson
- April 7:
  - Jimmy Osting
  - Ben Petrick
- April 12 – D. J. Carrasco
- April 15 – Paul Phillips
- April 19:
  - Joe Beimel
  - Dennys Reyes
  - George Sherrill
- April 21 – Kip Wells
- April 23:
  - Andruw Jones
  - Jason Tyner
- April 24 – Carlos Beltrán
- April 25 – Hajime Miki
- April 26:
  - Kosuke Fukudome
  - Chris Magruder
- April 27 – Orber Moreno
- April 28 – Jorge Sosa

=== May ===
- May 2 – Luke Hudson
- May 3 – Ryan Dempster
- May 5 – Tom Gregorio
- May 6 – Benito Báez
- May 13:
  - Robby Hammock
  - Chris Oxspring
- May 14 – Roy Halladay
- May 16 – Ivanon Coffie
- May 19:
  - Dan Giese
  - Brandon Inge
- May 20 – Steve Stemle
- May 24 – Jae Weong Seo
- May 25:
  - Alex Anthopoulos
  - Fernando Lunar
- May 27 – Mike Caruso
- May 28 – Alex Hernandez

=== June ===
- June 1 – Brad Wilkerson
- June 2 – Wascar Serrano
- June 3 – Travis Hafner
- June 6 – Mark Ellis
- June 7 – Joe Horgan
- June 11:
  - Odalis Pérez
  - Adam Pettyjohn
- June 13 – José Ortiz
- June 15 – Bret Prinz
- June 16 – Kerry Wood
- June 19 – Bruce Chen
- June 21 – Roger Deago
- June 25 – Ryan Kohlmeier
- June 27 – Juan Peña
- June 28:
  - Kevin McGlinchy
  - Chris Spurling
- June 29:
  - Tony McKnight
  - Shawn Sedlacek

=== July ===
- July 6 – Michael Ryan
- July 7 – Andy Green
- July 8 – Craig House
- July 11 – Javier López
- July 18 – Glenn Williams
- July 22 – Ryan Vogelsong
- July 24 – Jason Smith
- July 25 – Travis Phelps
- July 26 – Joaquín Benoit
- July 27 – Kyle Denney

=== August ===
- August 2 – Julio Mateo
- August 3 – Justin Lehr
- August 4 – Paxton Crawford
- August 5:
  - Eric Hinske
  - Mark Mulder
- August 7 – Tyler Yates
- August 8 – Jeremy Hill
- August 9 – Jason Frasor
- August 10:
  - Lorenzo Barceló
  - Julio Ramírez
- August 13 – Will Ohman
- August 14:
  - Scott Chiasson
  - Juan Pierre
- August 15 – Allen Levrault
- August 17 – Mike Maroth
- August 19 – Matt White
- August 20:
  - Josh Pearce
  - Aaron Taylor
- August 26:
  - Agustín Montero
  - Allan Simpson
- August 27 – Justin Miller
- August 28 – Tom Shearn
- August 29:
  - Steve Lomasney
  - Roy Oswalt
  - Aaron Rowand
- August 30:
  - Jon Adkins
  - Marlon Byrd

=== September ===
- September 2 – Yamid Haad
- September 3 – Nate Robertson
- September 4:
  - Matt DeWitt
  - Sun-Woo Kim
- September 5 – Jason Hart
- September 7 – Shane Nance
- September 9 – Kyle Snyder
- September 10:
  - Danys Báez
  - Chad Hermansen
- September 13 – Grant Roberts
- September 15 – Damian Rolls
- September 18 – Jody Gerut
- September 19 – Mike Smith
- September 21 – Brian Tallet
- September 23 – Brent Abernathy
- September 24 – Pasqual Coco
- September 25:
  - Wil Nieves
  - Chris Piersoll
- September 26 – Aaron Myette
- September 27 – Vicente Padilla
- September 29:
  - Heath Bell
  - Jake Westbrook

=== October ===
- October 3 – Eric Munson
- October 4 – Bobby Scales
- October 9 – Brian Roberts
- October 11 – Ty Wigginton
- October 15 – Mitch Jones
- October 19:
  - Mario Ramos
  - Randy Ruiz
- October 22 – Brad Thomas
- October 24 – Rafael Furcal
- October 26 – Scott Sobkowiak
- October 27 – Onan Masaoka
- October 28 – Chen Chin-Feng

=== November ===
- November 1 – Luis de los Santos
- November 4:
  - Larry Bigbie
  - Marcus Gwyn
- November 8 – Nick Punto
- November 9 – Peter Bergeron
- November 10 – Matt Cepicky
- November 11 – Mike Bacsik
- November 17 – Alex Graman
- November 19 – Justin Duchscherer
- November 23 – Adam Eaton
- November 26 – John Parrish
- November 27
  - Willie Bloomquist
  - Raúl Valdés
- November 29 – Jason Alfaro
- November 30 – Carlos Valderrama

=== December ===
- December 3 – Chad Durbin
- December 6 – Kevin Cash
- December 7:
  - Eric Chavez
  - Saúl Rivera
- December 10 – Dan Wheeler
- December 12 – Orlando Hudson
- December 14:
  - Doug DeVore
  - Dan Wright
- December 18 – José Acevedo
- December 21:
  - Buddy Carlyle
  - D'Angelo Jiménez
  - Freddy Sánchez
- December 23:
  - Shawn Chacón
  - Jesús Colomé
- December 24 – Matt Ginter
- December 29:
  - Jimmy Journell
  - Jack Wilson
- December 30 – Grant Balfour
- December 31 – Chris Reitsma

== Deaths ==
=== January ===
- January 1:
  - Mary Carey, 51, All-American Girls Professional Baseball League infielder
  - Danny Frisella, 30, Milwaukee Brewers relief pitcher who posted a 5–2 (2.74 ERA) record with a team-best nine saves in 1976; spent ten years in MLB and saved 57 career games for five teams, notably the New York Mets
- January 2 – Max Wilson, 60, left-handed pitcher who worked in 12 games for the 1940 Philadelphia Phillies and 1946 Washington Senators
- January 6 – Mike Miley, 23, California Angels shortstop and 1974 first-round draft pick, who played 84 total games for them in 1975 and 1976
- January 9 – Howard Lohr, 84, outfielder who played 21 career games for the 1914 Cincinnati Reds and 1916 Cleveland Indians
- January 10 – Vic Frazier, 72, pitcher for the Chicago White Sox (1931–1933 and 1939), Detroit Tigers (1933–1934) and Boston Bees (1937); went 23–38 (5.77) in 126 career games
- January 11:
  - Tex Carleton, 70, pitcher who won 100 games, losing 76, for the St. Louis Cardinals (1932–1934), Chicago Cubs (1935–1938) and Brooklyn Dodgers (1940); member of 1934 "Gashouse Gang" world champions and two other National League pennant-winners; as a Dodger, threw a no-hitter against Cincinnati on April 30, 1940
  - Stu Holcomb, 66, college football and basketball coach (Miami of Ohio, Purdue) and athletic director (Purdue, Northwestern) who served from September 1970 into late July 1973 as general manager of MLB's Chicago White Sox
- January 13 – Red Ostergard, 80, minor-league outfielder who went 4-for-11 (.364) as a pinch hitter for the 1921 White Sox in his lone MLB stint
- January 16:
  - Jim Hamilton, 54, shortstop/third baseman who played 19 games for the 1946 Kansas City Monarchs of the Negro American League
  - Baby Doll Jacobson, 86, center fielder for the St. Louis Browns and four other American League clubs between 1915 and 1927 who batted .311 lifetime, with 1,714 hits
- January 17 – Ernie Wingard, 76, left-handed pitcher who made 145 appearances for 1924–1927 St. Louis Browns
- January 19 – Don Hendrickson, 63, relief pitcher who appeared in 39 games for 1945–1946 Boston Braves
- January 29 – Hod Ford, 79, infielder for 15 seasons (1919–1933) with five NL teams, principally the Boston Braves and Cincinnati Reds; batted .263 in 1,446 games

=== February ===
- February 3 – Chi-Chi Olivo, 48, Dominican relief pitcher who worked in 96 games for the Milwaukee/Atlanta Braves in four seasons between 1961 and 1966; brother of Diomedes Olivo (who died on February 15)
- February 4 – Nemo Leibold, 84, outfielder in 1,268 games for four AL teams, principally the Chicago White Sox, from 1913 to 1925; batted .300 twice; later a minor league manager
- February 7 – Arthur Ehlers, 80, baseball executive; general manager of Philadelphia Athletics (1951–1953) and Baltimore Orioles (1954)
- February 8 – Boardwalk Brown, 87, pitcher for the Philadelphia Athletics (1911–1914) and New York Yankees (1914–1915); won 17 games for 1913 world champions, although he did not appear in the World Series
- February 15 – Diomedes Olivo, 58, brother of Chi-Chi Olivo and father of Gilberto Rondón; left-handed relief pitcher who broke into the majors at age 41 and appeared in 85 career games for the Pittsburgh Pirates (1960 and 1962) and St. Louis Cardinals (1963); later a Cardinals' scout
- February 16:
  - Rudolph Ash, 76, outfielder who appeared for the Chicago American Giants of the Negro National League in 1920 and the Hilldale Club and Newark Stars of the Eastern Colored League in 1926
  - Ken Nash, 88, who appeared in 35 games as a pinch hitter and infielder for the 1912 Cleveland Naps and 1914 St. Louis Cardinals
- February 18 – George Zackert, 92, pitcher in five games for the 1911–1912 Cardinals
- February 19 – Mike González, 86, Cuban catcher, coach and manager; his playing career encompassed 17 seasons and 1,042 games played for five National League clubs between 1912 and 1932; coached for St. Louis Cardinals for 13 seasons (1934 to 1946) and twice (in 1938 and 1940) served as acting manager of Redbirds; earned five World Series rings as a Cardinal player and coach; longtime fixture as manager and club owner in Cuban Winter League, and one of the first Latin Americans to forge a long post-playing career in MLB
- February 26 – Harry Welchonce, 93, who appeared in 26 games as an outfielder and pinch hitter for the 1911 Philadelphia Phillies

=== March ===
- March 3:
  - Tenny Edwards, 73, catcher/infielder in 22 games for the 1937 St. Louis Stars of the Negro American League
  - Stubby Overmire, 57, 5 ft 7 in (1.70 m) left-handed pitcher who appeared in 266 games for three American League clubs, primarily the Detroit Tigers, over a decade (1943–1952); member of 1945 World Series champ Tigers who also fashioned a long, post-playing career as a coach, scout and minor-league skipper for Detroit
- March 9 – Spike Merena, 67, pitcher who worked in four contests for the 1934 Boston Red Sox; in three MLB starting assignments, he tossed two complete games and one shutout
- March 13 – Hap Glenn, 63, third baseman who played in 20 games for the 1938 Atlanta Black Crackers of the Negro American League
- March 28 – Jelly Gardner, 81, outfielder who played a dozen seasons (1920–1931), primarily for the Chicago American Giants; led 1922 Negro National League in stolen bases
- March 30 – Barney Olsen, 57, centerfielder who played in 24 games for the 1941 Chicago Cubs

=== April ===
- April 3 – Hank Steinbacher, 64, outfielder for the Chicago White Sox from 1937 to 1939; batted .331 with 132 hits in 106 games in 1938
- April 4 – Sam Hill, 50, outfielder for the Chicago American Giants of the Negro American League (1946–1948); played in two All-Star games in 1948
- April 6 – Frank Rooney, 92, first baseman who appeared in 12 games for the 1914 Indianapolis Hoosiers of the "outlaw" Federal League
- April 9 – Roxie Lawson, 70, pitcher who hurled in 208 games for the Cleveland Indians (1930–1931), Detroit Tigers (1933 and 1935–1939) and St. Louis Browns (1939–1940)
- April 12:
  - Philip K. Wrigley, 82, owner of the Chicago Cubs from January 26, 1932, until his death; over those 45 years, his teams won four National League pennants, all between 1932 and 1945; kept arc lights and night games out of Wrigley Field; organized the All-American Girls Professional Baseball League in 1943; served as vice president of the NL from 1947 to 1966; his father and son were his predecessor and successor as Cubs' owner
  - Hal Leathers, 78, middle infielder who played nine games with the 1920 Cubs; contrary to surname, he made seven errors in 43 MLB chances for a poor fielding percentage of .837
  - Tim McCabe, 82, pitcher who went 5–1 (2.92 ERA) in 22 appearances for the 1915–1918 St. Louis Browns
- April 14 – Lionel Decuir, 62, catcher who appeared in 37 games in the Negro leagues between 1937 and 1940, 35 of them for the Kansas City Monarchs
- April 19 – Fred Carisch, 95, catcher/first baseman who got into 226 total games for the Pittsburgh Pirates (1903–1906), Cleveland Naps (1912–1914) and Detroit Tigers (1923); coach for the Tigers in 1923–1924
- April 22 – Rube Yarrison, 81, pitcher in 21 contests for the 1922 Philadelphia Athletics and 1924 Brooklyn Robins
- April 27 – Ernie Neitzke, 82, outfielder (eight games) and pitcher (two games) in 11 contests for the 1921 Boston Red Sox
- April 28 – Al Smith, 69, left-handed pitcher who won 99 games for the New York Giants, Philadelphia Phillies and Cleveland Indians (1934–1945); known as starting pitcher who halted Joe DiMaggio's 56-game hitting streak on July 17, 1941; in 1943, won 17 games for Indians and was named to the American League All-Star squad
- April 30 – Elam Vangilder, 81, pitcher for 1919–1927 St. Louis Browns and 1928–1929 Detroit Tigers, appearing in 367 total games

=== May ===
- May 5 – Bill Marshall, 66, second baseman who played for the Boston Red Sox (one game in 1931) and Cincinnati Reds (six games in 1934)
- May 8 – Frankie Pytlak, 68, good-hitting catcher who played in 795 games for Cleveland Indians (1932–1940) and Boston Red Sox (1941 and 1945–1946); batted .300 or better four times
- May 11:
  - Johnnie Chambers, 65, pitcher who appeared in two games for the 1937 St. Louis Cardinals
  - Oscar Horstmann, 85, pitcher who worked in 50 games for the 1917–1919 Cardinals
- May 13 – Adam DeBus, 84, shortstop/third baseman for the 1917 Pittsburgh Pirates who played in 38 games
- May 14 – Lou Maguolo, 77, legendary scout who covered the Midwestern U.S. for the St. Louis Browns and New York Yankees between 1936 and 1975
- May 23 – Sam Bohne, 80, infielder who played 663 games for three National League clubs, principally the Cincinnati Reds, in seven seasons spanning 1916 and 1926
- May 26 – Johnny Kucab, 57, relief pitcher for the 1950–1952 Philadelphia Athletics, appearing in 59 games; in one of his three career starts, he hurled a complete-game, 5–3 win on October 1, 1950, earning Connie Mack his 3,729th and final victory as a Hall of Fame manager

=== June ===
- June 2 – Milt Steengrafe, 79, pitcher who appeared in 16 games for the Chicago White Sox in 1924 and 1926
- June 10 – Turk Farrell, 43, hard-throwing pitcher who won 106 games, mainly with the Philadelphia Phillies and Houston Colt .45s/Astros, over 14 seasons (1956–1969); four-time NL All-Star; biological father of Richard Dotson
- June 15 – Big Bill Lee, 67, two-time All-Star pitcher who had a pair of 20-win seasons for the Chicago Cubs (1935 and 1938); in the latter year, led NL in earned run average (2.66); won 169 games over 14 seasons, 11 of them for the Cubs
- June 18 – Johnny Frederick, 75, slugger who hit .308 with 85 HR and 377 RBI in six seasons (1929–1934) for the Brooklyn Robins/Dodgers
- June 26 – Jack Berly, 74, pitcher for the St. Louis Cardinals (1924), New York Giants (1931) and Philadelphia Phillies (1932–1933) who appeared in 65 MLB games
- June 28 – Otto Bluege, 67, middle infielder who appeared in 109 games for the 1931–1932 Cincinnati Reds, then a longtime scout; brother of Ossie Bluege

=== July ===
- July 11 – Shag Crawford, 60, National League umpire who worked in 3,120 games from 1956 to 1975, plus three World Series and three All-Star games; father of umpire Jerry Crawford
- July 16 – Milt Stock, 84, third baseman who played in 1,628 games over 14 seasons (1913–1926) for four National League clubs, including 1915 NL champion Philadelphia, and batted .300 five times; later, both a minor-league manager and executive and an MLB coach; father-in-law of Eddie Stanky
- July 20:
  - James H. Lemon, 74, co-owner and club president of the Washington Senators from 1963 through 1967, and owner/board chairman in 1968, when he sold the club to Bob Short, who moved it to Arlington, Texas, in 1972
  - Red Longley, 67, outfielder, catcher and third baseman who was a stalwart member of the Memphis Red Sox of the Negro American League, playing for them for ten seasons spanning 1937 to 1947
- July 27 – Billy Holm, 65, catcher who appeared in 119 MLB games during World War II for the 1943–1944 Chicago Cubs and 1945 Boston Red Sox

=== August ===
- August 9 – George Milstead, 74, pitcher who worked in 36 total games for 1924–1926 Chicago Cubs
- August 12 – Bubber Jonnard, 79, back-up catcher for four clubs in 103 total games spread over six years between 1920 and 1935; later a coach and scout; twin brother of Claude Jonnard
- August 16:
  - Charlie Barnabe, 77, southpaw who was winless in seven decisions over 24 games pitched for the 1927–1928 Chicago White Sox
  - Al Javery, 59, pitcher who hurled in 205 games for the Boston Bees/Braves from 1940 to 1946; two-time (1943 and 1944) National League All-Star
  - Joe Kelly, 90, light-hitting outfielder who batted .224 in 376 career games for three National League clubs (1914, 1916–1919)
- August 19:
  - Bob Klinger, 69, pitcher who compiled a 66–61 record for the Pittsburgh Pirates (1938–1943) and Boston Red Sox (1946–1947); losing pitcher in decisive Game 7 of 1946 World Series
  - Russ Taylor, 51, Montreal sportscaster who was the #2 play-by-play broadcaster for the Expos' English-language radio team from their maiden MLB season, 1969, through 1976
  - Chuck Wortman, 85, weak-hitting shortstop for the Chicago Cubs from 1916 to 1918 who batted .186 in 161 career games; batted once in 1918 World Series
- August 24 – Leo Cristante, 50, relief pitcher who appeared in 30 MLB games for the 1951 Philadelphia Phillies and 1955 Detroit Tigers
- August 28 – Silvio García, 63, Cuban shortstop for the New York Cubans of the Negro National League (1936, 1940, 1946–1947); played in four All-Star games during his latter two seasons.
- August 30 – Leo Hannibal, 66, who played in 22 games, 18 as a pitcher, for four Negro leagues teams between 1932 and 1938

=== September ===
- September 2 – Chucho Ramos, 59, Venezuelan outfielder who collected five hits in ten at-bats over four May 1944 games for the Cincinnati Reds
- September 5 – John Barnes, 73, lefty-swinging catcher who played for 10 Negro National League teams between 1922 and 1931.
- September 7 – Buster Maynard, 64, outfielder who appeared in 224 games over five campaigns (1940, 1942–1943 and 1946) with New York Giants
- September 8 – Oral Hildebrand, 70, pitcher who won 83 games over a ten-year (1931–1940), 258-game career for the Cleveland Indians, St. Louis Browns and New York Yankees; chosen to American League squad for the first All-Star game in 1933; member of 1939 World Series champion Yankees
- September 14 – Beau Bell, 70, right fielder for St. Louis Browns (1935–1939), Detroit Tigers (1939) and Cleveland Indians (1940–1941) who led AL in hits (218) and doubles (51) in 1937; selected to AL All-Star team that season, and batted .297 lifetime in 767 MLB games; later coached at Texas A&M
- September 19 – Paddy Livingston, 97, catcher for Cleveland (1901, 1912) and Philadelphia (1909–1911) of the American League and Cincinnati (1906) and St. Louis (1917) of the National League, getting into 206 career games; at his death, the oldest major leaguer and the only survivor among players who appeared in the AL's inaugural season; member of 1910 World Series champion Athletics
- September 24 – Sherm Lollar, 53, seven-time American League All-Star catcher (1950, 1954–1956 and 1958–1960) who won first three Gold Gloves awarded (1957–1959); appeared in 1,752 games over 18 seasons for the Cleveland Indians (1946), New York Yankees (1947–1948, including 1947 World Series champions), St. Louis Browns (1949–1951) and Chicago White Sox (1952–1963) and batted .264 lifetime with 155 homers; later a coach, including service on 1966 Series champion Baltimore Orioles
- September 26 – Ernie Lombardi, 69, eight-time National League All-Star catcher (1936–1940, 1942–1943, 1945); played in 1,853 career games for four NL clubs, mainly the Cincinnati Reds and New York Giants, between 1931 and 1947; member of Reds' 1940 World Series champs; batted .306 lifetime with 190 homers; 1938 NL Most Valuable Player; only catcher to win two batting titles (1938 and 1942), he caught Johnny Vander Meer's back-to-back no-hitters in 1938; posthumously elected to the Hall of Fame in 1986
- September 30 – Del Pratt, 89, second baseman for four AL teams between 1912 and 1924 who led Junior Circuit in RBI in 1916 with St. Louis Browns; batted over .300 in his last five seasons, and collected 1,996 career hits

=== October ===
- October 1 – Pat Patterson, 80, third baseman/shortstop who went 14-for-35 (.400) over 23 games in his lone MLB audition with the World Series-bound 1921 New York Giants
- October 8 – Clarence Miles, 80, Baltimore attorney and lead member of the ownership group that purchased the St. Louis Browns in September 1953 and moved them to Maryland as the modern Orioles franchise; served as club president in 1954 and 1955 before selling his share of the team
- October 10 – Jim Lyle, 77, pitcher who made only one MLB appearance on October 2, 1925 for AL champion Washington Senators but won 212 games in the minor leagues
- October 13 – Joe Bratcher, 79, hard-hitting outfielder who batted .331 in a dozen minor league seasons (1920–1931), but played only four MLB games (and went hitless in his one official at bat) for the 1924 St. Louis Cardinals
- October 14 – Bing Crosby, 74, actor, singer and sportsman who was a minority owner of the Pittsburgh Pirates from August 1946 until his death
- October 17 – Cal Hubbard, 76, umpire in the American League from 1936 to 1951, and supervisor of AL arbiters from 1952 to 1969, who developed modern systems of umpire positioning; NFL defensive tackle from 1927 to 1936; only man to be selected to the Baseball (1976) and Pro Football (1963) halls of fame
- October 23 – George Gerken, 74, outfielder/pinch hitter who played 44 games for 1927–1928 Cleveland Indians
- October 24 – Bill Lewis, 73, catcher/pinch hitter who batted .327 in 101 at bats in a reserve role for St. Louis (1933) and Boston (1935–1936) of the National League
- October 27:
  - Carlisle Littlejohn, 76, pitcher in 26 games for the 1927–1928 St. Louis Cardinals
  - Red Lynn, 63, pitcher who worked in 85 career games for the Detroit Tigers (1939), New York Giants (1939–1940) and Chicago Cubs (1944)
- October 28 – Ralph Cleage, 79, outfielder who appeared in 23 games for the 1924 St. Louis Stars of the Negro National League
- October 30 – Bill Drake, 82, pitcher who worked in 190 Negro National League games between 1920 and 1930, principally for St. Louis and Kansas City; led NNL in games lost (14) in 1920 and games won (17) the following year; nicknamed "Plunk" for his willingness to pitch inside

=== November ===
- November 4 – Pinky Pittenger, 78, backup infielder/outfielder who played from 1921 through 1929 for the Boston Red Sox, Chicago Cubs and Cincinnati Reds
- November 8:
  - Jim Gladd, 55, catcher in four games for the 1946 New York Giants
  - Bob Griffith, 65, pitcher and occasional outfielder who hurled in 105 games in the Negro National League between 1934 and 1948; batted .265 in 135 games played
  - Bucky Harris, 81, Hall of Fame manager of five teams for 29 seasons between 1924 and 1956 who won the third-most games (2,157) in history; managed Washington Senators for 18 seasons over three terms, winning 1924 World Series as "Boy Wonder" rookie skipper; led Yankees to 1947 title; also won AL pennant in his sophomore managing campaign in 1925, but his Senators dropped that year's Fall Classic; skippered Detroit Tigers twice and Boston Red Sox and Philadelphia Phillies for one year each, and late in his career was general manager of 1959–1960 Red Sox; as second baseman (1919–1929 and 1931), led AL in double plays five times
- November 9:
  - Fred Haney, 79, player, manager, executive and broadcaster; infielder in 622 games with four MLB clubs over seven seasons in the 1920s; as a manager, he helmed two horrible teams, the 1939–1941 St. Louis Browns and 1953–1955 Pittsburgh Pirates, finishing last five times in six years; in June 1956, he became skipper of the contending Milwaukee Braves and led them to the 1957 World Series championship, 1958 National League pennant, and 1959 NL tie-breaker series before stepping down; returning to his native Los Angeles, he was the first general manager of the expansion Angels and served from December 1960 through 1968; in between these assignments, he was radio play-by-voice for minor-league Hollywood Stars (1943–1948) and color man for NBC-TV Game of the Week (1960)
  - Jack Ogden, 80, pitcher who appeared in 123 games in five seasons spanning 15 years (1918–1932) for the New York Giants, St. Louis Browns and Cincinnati Reds
- November 16 – José Acosta, 86, Cuban pitcher whose 16-season professional career included 55 games pitched for the 1920–1922 Washington Senators
- November 17 – Roger Peckinpaugh, 86, shortstop in 2,012 games for four American League teams between 1910 and 1927 who was named the 1925 league MVP in his last full season; starting shortstop of 1924 World Series champion Washington Senators; in 1914, at age 23, he became youngest manager in MLB history when on September 15 he was named interim pilot of the New York Yankees (leading them to a 10–10 record); later, served as manager (1928–1933 and 1941) and general manager (1941–1946) of Cleveland Indians
- November 21 – Ron Willis, 34, relief pitcher who, in his official rookie season, helped lead the 1967 World Series champion St. Louis Cardinals to the NL pennant, topping Redbirds in games pitched (65), notching ten saves (second on the club), and posting a 2.67 ERA; overall appeared in 188 games (all in relief) over all or parts of five MLB seasons (1966–1970) for the Cardinals, Houston Astros and San Diego Padres
- November 24 – Mayo Smith, 62, manager of the Philadelphia Phillies (1955–1958), Cincinnati Reds (1959) and Detroit Tigers (1967–1970) who led Detroit to the 1968 World Series title; posted a 663–613 lifetime record; an outfielder in his playing days who spent one year in majors, 1945, with wartime Philadelphia Athletics
- November 25 – Andy Childs, 72, second baseman and pinch hitter in 22 games for Indianapolis (1937) and Memphis (1938) of the Negro American League
- November 28 – Bob Meusel, 81, outfielder for the "Murderers' Row" New York Yankees of 1920–1929; batted over .300 seven times, including a career-high mark of .337 in 1927, hit for the cycle three times, appeared in six World Series (winning three rings), and led American League in home runs (33) and runs batted in (134) in 1925; brother of Irish Meusel
- November 29 – George Herbert Walker Jr., 72, New York investment banker and minority owner of the Mets from their founding in 1961 until just before his death; uncle and a namesake of the 41st President of the United States

=== December ===
- December 1 – Dobie Moore, 82, star shortstop for the Negro Leagues' Kansas City Monarchs (1920–1926) who batted .347 lifetime
- December 3 – Bill Bonness, 53, southpaw pitcher who made two appearances for the 1944 Cleveland Indians
- December 4 – Johnny Rizzo, 65, outfielder who played five seasons (1938–1942) for four National League clubs; knocked in 111 runs during his rookie year, trailing only Hall of Famers Joe Medwick and Mel Ott
- December 7 – Denny Sothern, 73, center fielder who appeared in 357 games over five campaigns between 1926 and 1931 for the Philadelphia Phillies, Pittsburgh Pirates and Brooklyn Robins
- December 8 – Art Ewoldt, 83, third baseman who played nine games for the 1919 Philadelphia Athletics
- December 11 – Berith Melin, 59, outfielder, one of the original Rockford Peaches founding members of the All-American Girls Professional Baseball League in its 1943 inaugural season
- December 18 – Leniel Hooker, 58, pitcher whose nine-year (1940–1948) career was spent almost entirely with the Newark Eagles; led Negro National League in winning percentage (.875) in 1942
- December 25 – Ken Guettler, 50, minor league baseball slugger of the 1940s and 1950s; eight-time home run champion who, in 1956, led the Double-A Texas League in homers (62) and runs batted in (143)
- December 26 – Al Mahon, 68, southpaw pitcher who appeared in three April and May contests for 1930 Philadelphia Athletics.
- December 29 – Jimmy Brown, 67, infielder and leadoff hitter for the St. Louis Cardinals (1937–1943) and Pittsburgh Pirates (1946); member of 1942 World Series champions and 1943 National League All-Star; with his playing career essentially ended by World War II, he became an MLB coach and minor-league manager
- December 30 – Halsey Hall, 79, longtime Minneapolis–Saint Paul sportswriter and broadcaster; after 27 years as radio voice of the minor-league Minneapolis Millers, joined broadcast team of relocated Minnesota Twins in 1961 and stayed through 1972
