= 1978 Montreal Expos season =

1978 Montreal Expos
- League: National League
- Division: East
- Ballpark: Olympic Stadium
- City: Montreal
- Record: 76–86 (.469)
- Divisional place: 4th
- Owners: Charles Bronfman
- General managers: Charlie Fox
- Managers: Dick Williams
- Television: CBC Television (Dave Van Horne, Duke Snider); Télévision de Radio-Canada (Jean-Pierre Roy, Guy Ferron)
- Radio: CFCF (English) (Dave Van Horne, Duke Snider); CKAC (French) (Claude Raymond, Jacques Doucet)

The 1978 Montreal Expos season was the tenth season in franchise history. The team finished fourth in the National League East with a record of 76–86, 14 games behind the first-place Philadelphia Phillies.

== Offseason ==
- October 25, 1977: Bombo Rivera was purchased from the Expos by the Minnesota Twins.
- November 10, 1977: Darold Knowles was purchased by the Expos from the Texas Rangers.
- December 7, 1977: Joe Kerrigan, Gary Roenicke and Don Stanhouse were traded by the Expos to the Baltimore Orioles for Rudy May, Randy Miller, and Bryn Smith.
- January 10, 1978: Tony Phillips was drafted by the Expos in the 1st round (10th pick) of the secondary phase of the 1978 Major League Baseball draft. Player signed March 10, 1978.
- March 29, 1978: Will McEnaney was traded by the Expos to the Pittsburgh Pirates for Tim Jones.

== Spring training ==
The Expos held spring training at City Island Ball Park in Daytona Beach, Florida. It was their sixth season there.

== Regular season ==
During the season, Ross Grimsley became the last pitcher to win at least 20 games in one season for the Expos.

=== Highlights ===
- May 5, 1978: Pete Rose of the Cincinnati Reds became the 13th and youngest player in major league history to collect his 3,000th career hit with a single off Expos pitcher Steve Rogers.
- July 20, 1978: Shortstop Chris Speier (hitting in the number eight slot) hit for the cycle at Olympic Stadium in Montreal in front of a crowd of 14,108. Speier is the second in Expos history to hit for the cycle. Pitcher Woodie Fryman picked up the victory. Coincidentally, Fryman also got the victory when Expos shortstop Tim Foli hit for the cycle in 1976.
- July 30, 1978: The Expos set a team record (never broken while the team was in Montreal) in hits in a game when they picked up 28 as they beat the Atlanta Braves by a score of 19–0. Andre Dawson, Larry Parrish, and Gary Carter led the way with 4 hits each. A crowd of 10,834 was on hand at Atlanta's Fulton County Stadium. Pitcher Woodie Fryman picked up the victory.

==== First Pearson Cup ====
The Pearson Cup was an annual mid-season exhibition between former Canadian rivals, the Toronto Blue Jays and the Expos. Named after former Prime Minister Lester B. Pearson, it was originally created to raise money for minor league baseball in Canada. In later years, it was incorporated into the interleague baseball schedule.

The series began in 1978, and Canadian Bill Atkinson was the winning pitcher and scored the winning run for the Expos in the first-ever Pearson Cup game at the Olympic Stadium on June 29.

=== Season standings ===
NL East
Team	W	L	Pct.	GB	Home	Road
Philadelphia Phillies	90	72	.556	—	54‍–‍28	36‍–‍44
Pittsburgh Pirates	88	73	.547	1½	55‍–‍26	33‍–‍47
Chicago Cubs	79	83	.488	11	44‍–‍38	35‍–‍45
Montreal Expos	76	86	.469	14	41‍–‍39	35‍–‍47
St. Louis Cardinals	69	93	.426	21	37‍–‍44	32‍–‍49
New York Mets	66	96	.407	24	33‍–‍47	33‍–‍49

=== Record vs. opponents ===
1978 National League record Sources:
Team	ATL	CHC	CIN	HOU	LAD	MON	NYM	PHI	PIT	SD	SF	STL
Atlanta	—	5–7	6–12	8–10	5–13	5–7	6–6	8–4	2–10	8–10	11–7	5–7
Chicago	7–5	—	7–5	6–6	4–8	7–11	11–7	4–14	7–11	7–5	4–8	15–3
Cincinnati	12–6	5–7	—	11–7	9–9	8–4	7–5	7–5	4–7	9–9	12–6	8–4
Houston	10–8	6–6	7–11	—	7–11	6–6	7–5	6–6	4–8	8–10	6–12	7–5
Los Angeles	13–5	8–4	9–9	11–7	—	8–4	7–5	7–5	7–5	9–9	11–7	5–7
Montreal	7–5	11–7	4–8	6–6	4–8	—	8–10	9–9	7–11	6–6	5–7	9–9
New York	6–6	7–11	5–7	5–7	5–7	10–8	—	6–12	7–11	5–7	3–9	7–11
Philadelphia	4-8	14–4	5–7	6–6	5–7	9–9	12–6	—	11–7	8–4	6–6	10–8
Pittsburgh	10–2	11–7	7–4	8–4	5–7	11–7	11–7	7–11	—	5–7	4–8	9–9
San Diego	10–8	5–7	9–9	10–8	9–9	6–6	7–5	4–8	7–5	—	8–10	9–3
San Francisco	7–11	8–4	6–12	12–6	7–11	7–5	9–3	6–6	8–4	10–8	—	9–3
St. Louis	7–5	3–15	4–8	5–7	7–5	9–9	11–7	8–10	9–9	3–9	3–9	—

=== Notable transactions ===
- May 20, 1978: Larry Landreth and Gerry Hannahs were traded by the Expos to the Los Angeles Dodgers for Mike Garman.
- June 6, 1978: 1978 Major League Baseball draft
  - Dave Hostetler was drafted by the Expos in the 4th round.
  - Bill Mooneyham was drafted by the Expos in the 6th round, but did not sign.
  - Jim Deshaies was drafted by the Expos in the 13th round, but did not sign.
  - Razor Shines was drafted by the Expos in the 18th round.
- June 9, 1978: The Expos traded a player to be named later to the Chicago Cubs for Woodie Fryman. The Expos completed the deal by sending Jerry White to the Cubs on June 23.

=== Roster ===
1978 Montreal Expos
Roster
Pitchers: 42 Bill Atkinson; 22 Stan Bahnsen; 28 Hal Dues; 35 Woodie Fryman; 29 Mike Garman; 48 Ross Grimsley; 16 Fred Holdsworth; 20 Bob James; 32 Darold Knowles; 43 Rudy May; 47 Randy Miller; 46 David Palmer; 18 Gerry Pirtle; 45 Steve Rogers; 21 Scott Sanderson; 36 Dan Schatzeder; 33 Wayne Twitchell	Catchers: 8 Gary Carter; 39 Jerry Fry; 34 Ed Herrmann; 44 Bobby Ramos; 9 Bob Reece; Infielders: 30 Dave Cash; 38 Pepe Frías; 11 Wayne Garrett; 37 Tommy Hutton; 12 Stan Papi; 15 Larry Parrish; 24 Tony Pérez; 4 Chris Speier; 25 Del Unser	Outfielders: 49 Warren Cromartie; 10 Andre Dawson; 14 Sam Mejías; 17 Ellis Valentine; 37 Jerry White	Manager: 23 Dick Williams; Coaches: 2 Jim Brewer (Pitching); 6 Billy Gardner (First base); 40 Norm Sherry (Bullpen); 3 Mickey Vernon (Hitting); 1 Ozzie Virgil (Third base)

== Player stats ==
= Indicates team leader

=== Batting ===
==== Starters by position ====
Note: Pos = Position; G = Games played; AB = At bats; H = Hits; Avg. = Batting average; HR = Home runs; RBI = Runs batted in

Pos	Player	G	AB	H	Avg.	HR	RBI
C	Gary Carter	157	533	136	.255	20	72
1B	Tony Pérez	148	544	158	.290	14	78
2B	Dave Cash	159	658	166	.252	3	43
SS	Chris Speier	150	501	126	.251	5	51
3B	Larry Parrish	144	520	144	.277	15	70
LF	Warren Cromartie	159	607	180	.297	10	56
CF	Andre Dawson	157	609	154	.253	25	72
RF	Ellis Valentine	151	570	165	.289	25	76

==== Other batters ====
Note: G = Games played; AB = At bats; H = Hits; Avg. = Batting average; HR = Home runs; RBI = Runs batted in

Player	G	AB	H	Avg.	HR	RBI
Del Unser	130	179	35	.196	2	15
Stan Papi	67	152	35	.230	0	11
Wayne Garrett	49	69	12	.174	1	2
Tommy Hutton	39	59	12	.203	0	5
Sam Mejías	67	56	13	.232	0	6
Ed Herrmann	19	40	7	.175	0	3
Pepe Frías	73	15	4	.267	0	5
Bob Reece	9	11	2	.182	0	3
Jerry White	18	10	2	.200	0	0
Jerry Fry	4	9	0	.000	0	0
Bobby Ramos	2	4	0	.000	0	0

=== Pitching ===
==== Starting pitchers ====
Note: G = Games pitched; IP = Innings pitched; W = Wins; L = Losses; ERA = Earned run average; SO = Strikeouts

Player	G	IP	W	L	ERA	SO
Ross Grimsley	36	263.0	20	11	3.05	84
Steve Rogers	30	219.0	13	10	2.47	126
Rudy May	27	144.0	8	10	3.88	87
Woodie Fryman	19	94.2	5	7	3.61	53
Scott Sanderson	10	61.0	4	2	2.51	50

==== Other pitchers ====
Note: G = Games pitched; IP = Innings pitched; W = Wins; L = Losses; ERA = Earned run average; SO = Strikeouts

Player	G	IP	W	L	ERA	SO
Dan Schatzeder	29	143.2	7	7	3.07	69
Wayne Twitchell	33	112.0	4	12	5.38	69
Hal Dues	25	99.0	5	6	2.36	36
David Palmer	5	9.2	0	1	2.79	7
Bob James	4	4.0	0	1	9.00	3

==== Relief pitchers ====
Note: G = Games pitched; W = Wins; L = Losses; SV = Saves; ERA = Earned run average; SO = Strikeouts

Player	G	W	L	SV	ERA	SO
Mike Garman	47	4	6	13	4.40	23
Darold Knowles	60	3	3	6	2.38	34
Stan Bahnsen	44	1	5	7	3.84	44
Bill Atkinson	29	2	2	3	4.37	32
Gerry Pirtle	19	0	2	0	5.96	14
Fred Holdsworth	6	0	0	0	7.27	3
Randy Miller	5	0	1	0	10.29	6
Sam Mejías	1	0	0	0	0.00	0

== Awards and honors ==
=== All-Stars ===
1978 Major League Baseball All-Star Game

- Ross Grimsley, reserve
- Steve Rogers, reserve

== Farm system ==
Level	Team	League	Manager
AAA	Denver Bears	American Association	Doc Edwards
AA	Memphis Chicks	Southern League	Felipe Alou
A	West Palm Beach Expos	Florida State League	Larry Bearnarth
A-Short Season	Jamestown Expos	New York–Penn League	Pat Daugherty
