= Gerry Pirtle =

American baseball player (born 1947)

- Pitcher
- Born: December 3, 1947 (age 78); Tulsa, Oklahoma, U.S.
- Batted: Right Threw: Right

MLB debut
- July 2, 1978, for the Montreal Expos

Last MLB appearance
- September 7, 1978, for the Montreal Expos

MLB statistics
- Win–loss record: 0–2
- Earned run average: 5.96
- Strikeouts: 14
- Stats at Baseball Reference

Teams
- Montreal Expos (1978)

Gerald Eugene Pirtle (born December 3, 1947) is an American former pitcher in Major League Baseball who played briefly for the Montreal Expos in their 1978 season. Listed at 6 ft 1 in (1.85 m), 185 pounds (84 kg), he batted and threw right handed.

== Career ==
Born in Tulsa, Oklahoma he attended Nathan Hale High School. Pirtle then attended Bacone College in Muskogee, OK. He was originally selected by the New York Yankees in the seventh round of the 1967 MLB draft, playing for them in nine Minor League seasons spanning 1967–75. He later pitched in the Chicago Cubs minors system from 1976 to 1978, before signing as a free agent with Montreal in the 1978 midseason.

In 19 relief appearances for the Expos, Pirtle posted a 5.96 ERA with 2 losses, giving up 24 runs (17 earned) on 33 hits and 23 walks, while striking out 14 in 25 2/3 innings of work.

In between, Pirtle went 91–92 with a 3.48 ERA in 489 minor league games, and also played winter ball with the Navegantes del Magallanes club of the Venezuelan League in its 1972–73 season.
