= Weedy Edwards =

- Pitcher
- Batted: Unknown Threw: Unknown

Negro league baseball debut
- 1947, for the Newark Eagles

Last appearance
- 1947, for the Newark Eagles
- Stats at Baseball Reference

Teams
- Newark Eagles (1947)

Weedy Edwards was an American professional baseball pitcher in the Negro leagues. He played with the Newark Eagles in 1947. His father, Teannie Edwards, also played in the Negro leagues.
