= Jim Hamilton (baseball) =

American baseball player

- Shortstop
- Born: March 25, 1922; Texarkana, Texas, U.S.
- Died: January 16, 1977 (aged 54); Santa Clara, California, U.S.
- Batted: Left Threw: Right

Negro league baseball debut
- 1946, for the Kansas City Monarchs

Last appearance
- 1946, for the Kansas City Monarchs

Teams
- Kansas City Monarchs (1946)

James Hamilton (March 25, 1922 – January 16, 1977) was an American Negro league shortstop in the 1940s.

A native of Texarkana, Texas, Hamilton attended Bakersfield High School in Bakersfield, California. He played for the Kansas City Monarchs in 1946, posting 11 hits in 63 plate appearances over 19 recorded games. Hamilton died in Santa Clara, California in 1977 at age 54.
