= Jerry Fry =

American baseball player (born 1956)

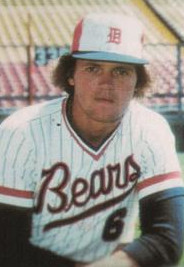
- Fry in 1978
- Catcher
- Born: February 29, 1956 (age 70); Salinas, California
- Batted: Right Threw: Right

MLB debut
- September 4, 1978, for the Montreal Expos

Last MLB appearance
- September 9, 1978, for the Montreal Expos

MLB statistics
- Games: 4
- At bats: 9
- Hits: 0
- Stats at Baseball Reference

Teams
- Montreal Expos (1978)

Jerry Ray Fry (born February 29, 1956) is a former Major League Baseball player. Fry played in four games for the Montreal Expos in the 1978 season. He had no hits in nine at-bats, with one walk. He was drafted by the Expos in the second round of the 1974 amateur draft.
