= Pat Patterson (infielder, born 1897) =

American baseball player

- Third baseman / Shortstop
- Born: January 29, 1897; Belleville, Illinois, U.S.
- Died: October 1, 1977 (aged 80); St. Louis, Missouri, U.S.
- Batted: Right Threw: Right

MLB debut
- April 14, 1921, for the New York Giants

Last MLB appearance
- June 29, 1921, for the New York Giants

MLB statistics
- Batting average: .400
- Home runs: 1
- Runs batted in: 5
- Stats at Baseball Reference

Teams
- New York Giants (1921)

William Jennings Bryan "Pat" Patterson (January 29, 1897 – October 1, 1977) was an American professional baseball player, a third baseman and shortstop who appeared in 23 games in Major League Baseball for the 1921 New York Giants. Born in Belleville, Illinois, Patterson threw and batted right-handed and was listed as 6 feet (1.8 m) tall and 175 pounds (79 kg). His elder brother Ham also had a brief big-league career.

Pat Patterson's stint with the 1921 Giants came during the first two months of the season. He played sparingly until mid-June, going 2-for-5 in 15 brief appearances as a pinch hitter or defensive replacement. Then, between June 18–29, he started eight games in place of regular third baseman Frankie Frisch, a future Hall of Famer. In that span, Patterson had five multi-hit games, batted .400 (12 for 30), and slugged his lone big-league home run (off Lee Meadows of the Philadelphia Phillies). But when Frisch returned to the lineup, Patterson was sent to the Seattle Rainiers of the Pacific Coast League, and he never returned to the majors. The Giants went on to win the World Series that season.

Including his early-season appearances, Patterson posted a .400 lifetime batting average, with 14 hits in 35 at bats, as a major leaguer.
