= Rudolph Ash =

American baseball player

- Outfielder
- Born: November 2, 1899; South Bend, Indiana, U.S.
- Died: February 1977; New York City, New York, U.S.
- Batted: Unknown Threw: Unknown

Negro league baseball debut
- 1920, for the Chicago American Giants

Last appearance
- 1926, for the Newark Stars
- Stats at Baseball Reference

Teams
- Chicago American Giants (1920); Hilldale Club (1926); Newark Stars (1926)

Rudolph Thaddeus Ash (November 2, 1899 – February 1977) was an American professional baseball outfielder in the Negro leagues. He played with the Chicago American Giants in 1920 and the Hilldale Club and the Newark Stars in 1926.
