= Ralph Cleage =

American baseball player

- Outfielder
- Born: January 25, 1898; Athens, Tennessee
- Died: October 28, 1977 (aged 79); Knoxville, Tennessee

Negro league baseball debut
- 1924, for the St. Louis Stars

Last appearance
- 1924, for the St. Louis Stars

Teams
- St. Louis Stars (1924)

Ralph Pete Cleage (January 25, 1898 – October 28, 1977) was an American Negro league baseball outfielder in the 1920s.

A native of Athens, Tennessee, Cleage played for the St. Louis Stars in 1924. In 23 recorded games, he posted 17 hits in 77 plate appearances. Cleage died in Knoxville, Tennessee in 1977 at age 79.
