= Andy Childs (baseball) =

American baseball player

- Second baseman
- Born: November 12, 1905; Pine Bluff, Arkansas U.S.
- Died: November 25, 1977 (aged 72); San Diego, California, U.S.
- Batted: Right Threw: Right

Negro league baseball debut
- 1937, for the Indianapolis Athletics

Last appearance
- 1938, for the Memphis Red Sox
- Stats at Baseball Reference

Teams
- Indianapolis Athletics (1937); Memphis Red Sox (1938)

Andy S. Childs (November 12, 1905 – November 25, 1977) was an American Negro league second baseman in the 1930s.

A native of Pine Bluff, Arkansas, Childs made his Negro leagues debut in 1937 with the Indianapolis Athletics. He went on to play for the Memphis Red Sox the following season. Childs died in San Diego, California in 1977 at age 72.
