= Teannie Edwards =

American baseball player

- Catcher
- Born: March 1, 1904; St. Louis, Missouri, U.S.
- Died: March 3, 1977 (aged 73); St. Louis, Missouri, U.S.
- Batted: Right Threw: Right

Negro league baseball debut
- 1936, for the St. Louis Stars

Last appearance
- 1937, for the Indianapolis Athletics
- Stats at Baseball Reference

Teams
- St. Louis Stars (1936-1937); Indianapolis Athletics (1937)

Frank Nutinous "Teannie" Edwards (March 1, 1904 – March 3, 1977) was an American professional baseball catcher in the Negro leagues. He played with the St. Louis Stars in 1936 and 1937 and the Indianapolis Athletics in 1937. His son, Weedy Edwards, also played in the Negro leagues.
