= Bob Reece =

American baseball player (born 1951)

- Catcher
- Born: January 5, 1951 (age 75); Sacramento, California, U.S.
- Batted: Right Threw: Right

MLB debut
- April 22, 1978, for the Montreal Expos

Last MLB appearance
- September 16, 1978, for the Montreal Expos

MLB statistics
- Batting average: .182
- Hits: 2
- Runs batted in: 3
- Stats at Baseball Reference

Teams
- Montreal Expos (1978)

Robert Scott Reece (born January 5, 1951) is an American former professional baseball player. A catcher, he was a graduate of Stanford University and spent nine seasons in the minor league system of the Montreal Expos — playing in nine games in the Major Leagues for Montreal at the beginning and the end of the 1978 season. He threw and batted right-handed, stood 6 feet 1 inch (1.85 m) tall and weighed 190 pounds (86 kg).

== Career ==
Reece was signed by the Expos as a non-drafted free agent in 1973. He reached the Triple-A level in 1975 as a member of the Memphis Blues of the International League, then the Expos' top farm system affiliate. The following season, Montreal signed a player development contract with the Denver Bears of the American Association, and Reece would spend all or parts of six years as a member of the Bears.

In 1978, Reece batted a career-high .296 in 47 games for Denver, in between his Major League trial with the Expos. He played rarely for Montreal, appearing in a total of seven games between April and early June. On May 7, his third big league game, Reece collected his first MLB hit, run scored and run batted in when he doubled off relief pitcher Dave Tomlin during a 19–5 rout of the Cincinnati Reds at Riverfront Stadium.

He started his first MLB game at catcher two days later during the second game of a doubleheader against the Atlanta Braves; he was held hitless in two at bats by future Hall of Famer Phil Niekro, then was pinch hit for by the Expos' regular catcher, another future Hall of Famer, Gary Carter. During his late-season stint with the Expos, Reece got into two September games.

In the second of those, on September 16, he singled off Don Robinson of the Pittsburgh Pirates for his second and final MLB hit in his final big-league appearance.

Reece started three of the MLB games in which he played. He collected two hits in 11 at-bats, with no bases on balls, striking out four times. His minor league career ended after the 1981 season and 672 games played.
