= Randy Miller (baseball) =

American baseball player (born 1953)

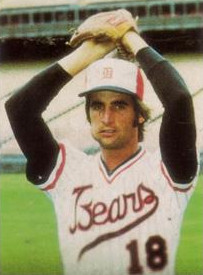
- Miller with Denver Bears in 1978
- Pitcher
- Born: March 18, 1953 (age 72); Oxnard, California, U.S.
- Batted: Right Threw: Right

MLB debut
- September 7, 1977, for the Baltimore Orioles

Last MLB appearance
- September 16, 1978, for the Montreal Expos

MLB statistics
- Win–loss record: 0–1
- Earned run average: 12.91
- Strikeouts: 6
- Stats at Baseball Reference

Teams
- Baltimore Orioles (1977); Montreal Expos (1978)

Randall Scott Miller (born March 18, 1953) is an American former Major League Baseball pitcher who played with the Baltimore Orioles in 1977 and the Montreal Expos in 1978. He was traded along with Rudy May and Bryn Smith from the Orioles to the Expos for Don Stanhouse, Joe Kerrigan and Gary Roenicke at the Winter Meetings on December 7, 1977.
