= Joe Kerrigan =

American baseball player, coach, and manager (born 1954)

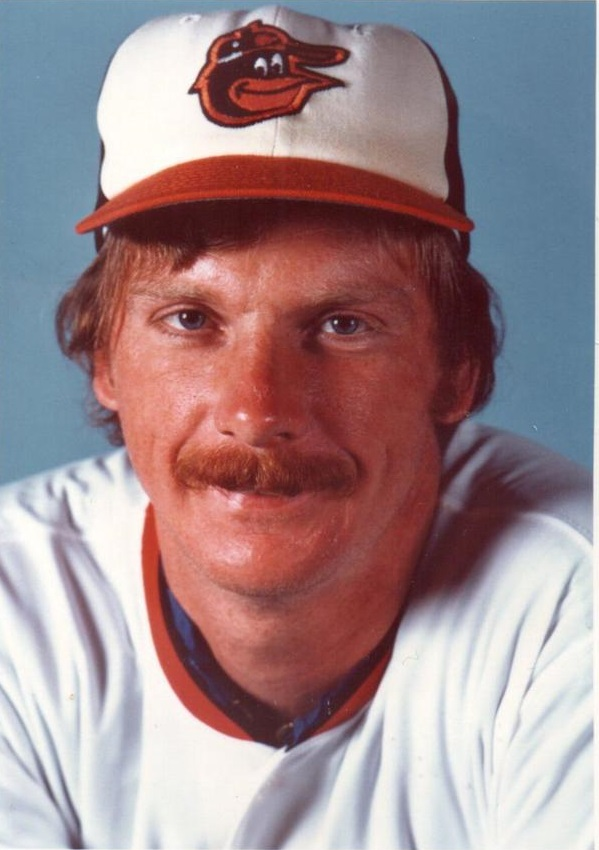
- Kerrigan with the Baltimore Orioles in 1978
- Pitcher / Manager
- Born: January 30, 1954 (age 72); Philadelphia, Pennsylvania, U.S.
- Batted: Right Threw: Right

MLB debut
- July 9, 1976, for the Montreal Expos

Last MLB appearance
- April 12, 1980, for the Baltimore Orioles

MLB statistics
- Win–loss record: 8–12
- Earned run average: 3.89
- Strikeouts: 107
- Managerial record: 17–26
- Winning %: .395
- Stats at Baseball Reference

Teams
- As player: Montreal Expos (1976–1977); Baltimore Orioles (1978–1980); As manager: Boston Red Sox (2001); As coach: Montreal Expos (1983–1986, 1992–1996); Boston Red Sox (1997–2001); Philadelphia Phillies (2003–2004); New York Yankees (2006–2007); Pittsburgh Pirates (2009–2010)

Joseph Thomas Kerrigan (born January 30, 1954) is an American former Major League Baseball (MLB) relief pitcher, manager, and longtime pitching coach. He played for the Montreal Expos and Baltimore Orioles from 1976 to 1980, and managed the Boston Red Sox in 2001.

== Biography ==
A native of Philadelphia, Pennsylvania, Kerrigan attended Father Judge High School and Temple University where he played in the 1972 College World Series. Later that summer, he played collegiate summer baseball in the Cape Cod Baseball League for the Orleans Cardinals. He was selected in the first round of the 1974 amateur draft by the Montreal Expos. His major league debut was on July 9, 1976. He was acquired along with Don Stanhouse and Gary Roenicke by the Baltimore Orioles from the Expos for Rudy May, Randy Miller and Bryn Smith at the Winter Meetings on December 7, 1977. He played with the Orioles until 1980.

=== Coaching career ===
His coaching career began in 1983 when he was named the bullpen coach for the Expos. From 1987 to 1991, he was the pitching coach for three different Montreal farm teams, and in 1992, became the pitching coach of the Expos. From 1997 to 2001 he filled the same role for the Red Sox under manager Jimy Williams, working with 1999 and 2000 Cy Young Award winner Pedro Martínez. In August 2001, after Williams was fired, Kerrigan was named the manager and signed a multi-year contract for the position with then-GM Dan Duquette. However, he led the team to a 17–26 record and, with new ownership taking over in the offseason, was replaced by Grady Little during spring training in 2002.

Kerrigan later served as pitching coach for the Philadelphia Phillies and was hired as the bullpen coach for the New York Yankees in November 2005. In October 2008, he became the pitching coach for the Pittsburgh Pirates. Kerrigan was relieved of his duty as pitching coach for the Pittsburgh Pirates on August 8, 2010.

== Managerial record ==
Team	Year	Regular season					Postseason			
Team	Year	Games	Won	Lost	Win %	Finish	Won	Lost	Win %	Result
BOS	2001	43	17	26	.395	2nd in AL East	–	–	–	–
Total		43	17	26	.395		0	0	–	

Preceded by Mel Wright	Montreal Expos bullpen coach 1983–1986	Succeeded by Ken Macha
Preceded by Larry Bearnarth	Montreal Expos pitching coach 1992–1996	Succeeded by Bobby Cuellar
Preceded by Sammy Ellis	Boston Red Sox pitching coach 1997 – August 16, 2001	Succeeded by John Cumberland
Preceded by Jeff Andrews	Pittsburgh Pirates pitching coach 2009 – August 8, 2010	Succeeded by Ray Searage
