= Gary Roenicke =

American baseball player (born 1954)

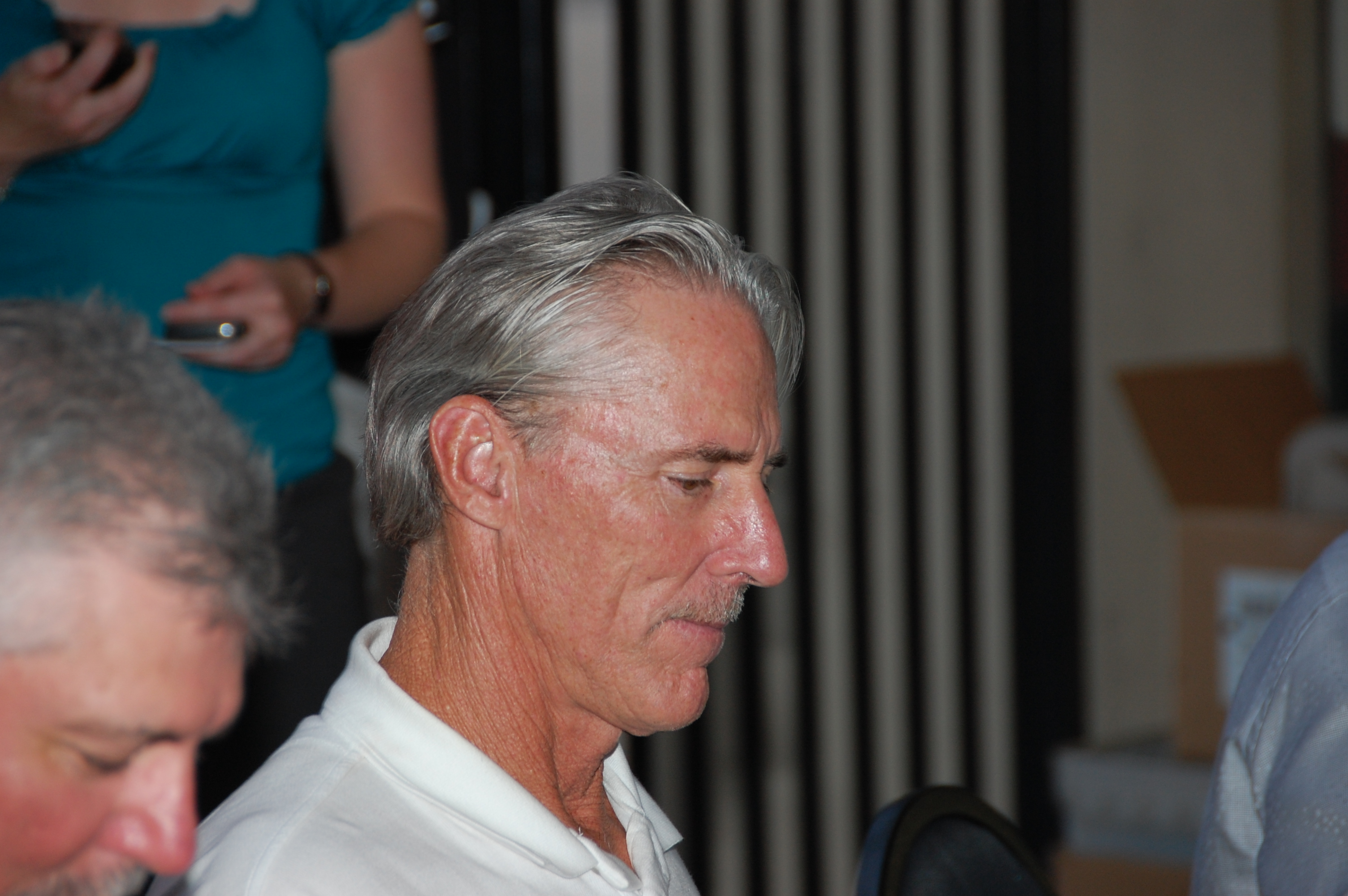
- Roenicke in 2008
- Left fielder
- Born: December 5, 1954 (age 71); Covina, California, U.S.
- Batted: Right Threw: Right

MLB debut
- June 8, 1976, for the Montreal Expos

Last MLB appearance
- July 24, 1988, for the Atlanta Braves

MLB statistics
- Batting average: .247
- Home runs: 121
- Runs batted in: 410
- Stats at Baseball Reference

Teams
- Montreal Expos (1976); Baltimore Orioles (1978–1985); New York Yankees (1986); Atlanta Braves (1987–1988)

Career highlights and awards
- World Series champion (1983); Baltimore Orioles Hall of Fame

Gary Steven Roenicke (born December 5, 1954) is an American former Major League Baseball left fielder for the Montreal Expos (1976), Baltimore Orioles (1978–85), New York Yankees (1986) and Atlanta Braves (1987–88).

== Early career ==
Roenicke was originally drafted by the Montreal Expos as the eighth pick of the first round of the 1973 amateur draft. He earned the MVP Award in the Eastern League in 1975. A year later, he made his major league debut with the Expos, hitting .222 in 29 games with two home runs and five runs batted in (RBI).

== Oriole career ==
Roenicke was acquired along with Don Stanhouse and Joe Kerrigan by the Orioles from the Expos for Rudy May, Bryn Smith and Randy Miller at the Winter Meetings on December 7, 1977.

Roenicke appeared in 27 games in his first season with the Orioles in 1978. A year later, in his first full season, he had perhaps the best season of his career, appearing in 133 games and hitting .261 with 25 home runs and 64 runs batted in. He even made the top ten in at-bats per home run, with one home run every 15.0 AB. The next year, he hit .239 with 10 home runs, 28 runs batted in. In 1981 he hit .269, but his power numbers were still significantly down, slugging only .384, whereas he had slugged .508 in his rookie season. In 1982, he hit .270 with a slugging percentage of .499 in 137 games, platooning with John Lowenstein and Benny Ayala. In 1984, he hit a grand slam during the Home Run Derby jackpot inning of a locally televised game against the Yankees, which resulted in a $1 million jackpot award to a Maryland viewer.

== Decline ==
Roenicke never established numbers like the 1982 season or rookie season. After a .218 campaign with 15 homers and 43 RBI, he was traded from the Orioles to the Yankees for Rex Hudler and Rich Bordi on December 11, 1985, in a transaction that was completed five days later on December 16 when Leo Hernández was also sent to New York. On the Yankees, his role was limited to a bench player and his power was down, with three home runs. He signed as a free agent in 1986 by the Atlanta Braves for less than half the amount of money he had been making ($380,000). He continued his career on the bench, this year doing better in the power department, hitting nine home runs. The next year, he hit .228 with a .298 slugging percentage, the worst of his career. He was released by the Braves on July 26, 1988, and retired.

== Post-playing career ==
Roenicke resides in Rough and Ready, California, and is currently an adviser for the Western Canadian Baseball League, as well as a scout for the Orioles. His brother, Ron, had an eight-year career as an outfielder in the 1980s while his son Josh was a member of both the UCLA football and baseball teams as a wide receiver and outfielder. On the UCLA Bruins, Josh had the second-highest on-base percentage, third-highest batting average and compiled a perfect fielding percentage. Josh was drafted by the Cincinnati Reds, made his major-league baseball debut with the Reds as a pitcher on September 13, 2008, and on July 31, 2009, was traded to the Toronto Blue Jays.
