= Don Stanhouse =

American baseball player (born 1951)

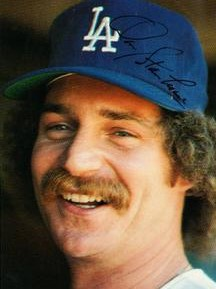
- Pitcher
- Born: February 12, 1951 (age 75); Du Quoin, Illinois, U.S.
- Batted: Right Threw: Right

MLB debut
- April 19, 1972, for the Texas Rangers

Last MLB appearance
- September 24, 1982, for the Baltimore Orioles

MLB statistics
- Win–loss record: 38–54
- Earned run average: 3.84
- Strikeouts: 408
- Saves: 64
- Stats at Baseball Reference

Teams
- Texas Rangers (1972–1974); Montreal Expos (1975–1977); Baltimore Orioles (1978–1979); Los Angeles Dodgers (1980); Baltimore Orioles (1982)

Career highlights and awards
- All-Star (1979)

Donald Joseph Stanhouse (born February 12, 1951) is an American former professional baseball pitcher who had an eight-year Major League Baseball (MLB) career (1972–1980) with a brief comeback in 1982. He pitched for the Texas Rangers and Baltimore Orioles of the American League and the Montreal Expos and Los Angeles Dodgers of the National League.

Stanhouse was traded, along with Pete Mackanin, from the Rangers to the Expos for Willie Davis at the Winter Meetings on December 5, 1974. Shuttled back and forth from the bullpen to the starting rotation with the Rangers and Expos, he was acquired along with Joe Kerrigan and Gary Roenicke by the Orioles from Montreal for Rudy May, Randy Miller and Bryn Smith at the Winter Meetings on December 7, 1977. Stanhouse excelled in 1978 when Manager Earl Weaver employed him as a full-time closer. Because of his Harpo Marx hairstyle and pre-game batting practice antics – where his primal scream would entertain early ballpark arrivals – he was quickly labeled Stan the Man Unusual, a pun on the nickname "Stan the Man" for Hall-of-Famer Stan Musial. Jim Palmer said that in 1978, he was the Orioles' best relief pitcher.

Stanhouse finished third in the American League in both 1978 and 1979 in saves, recording 45 over that span, helping the Orioles capture the American League Championship in 1979. He was selected to the American League All-Star team in 1979.

Although an effective closer, Stanhouse had a reputation of walking batters he was not willing to face. Frequently, his tactics would lead to dangerous situations in close games with multiple base-runners, and send the chain-smoking Weaver pacing back and forth in the dugout in agony. This resulted in Weaver nicknaming Stanhouse Fullpack, referring to the number of cigarettes consumed while watching him pitch. Weaver also was quoted in saying Stanhouse was an asshole, who ruined his health.

Stanhouse left the Orioles as a free agent after the Orioles lost the 1979 World Series and signed a large guaranteed contract with the Los Angeles Dodgers. He was ineffective for the Dodgers in 1980, appearing in 21 games and posting an ERA over 5.00. The Dodgers sent Stanhouse home during the season. He did not pitch at all in 1981, after which his contract expired, and he was not re-signed by the Dodgers. Stanhouse retired after a brief comeback with the Orioles the following year.

After retirement, Stanhouse became a business consultant for a venture capital firm. Married for 27 years, and a father of three, he lives in Trophy Club, Texas.
