= Rudy May =

American baseball player (1944–2024)

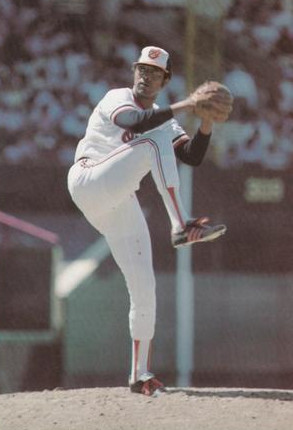
- Pitcher
- Born: July 18, 1944; Coffeyville, Kansas, U.S.
- Died: October 19, 2024 (aged 80); Hertford, North Carolina, U.S.
- Batted: Left Threw: Left

MLB debut
- April 18, 1965, for the Los Angeles Angels

Last MLB appearance
- September 21, 1983, for the New York Yankees

MLB statistics
- Win–loss record: 152–156
- Earned run average: 3.46
- Strikeouts: 1,760
- Stats at Baseball Reference

Teams
- Los Angeles / California Angels (1965, 1969–1974); New York Yankees (1974–1976); Baltimore Orioles (1976–1977); Montreal Expos (1978–1979); New York Yankees (1980–1983)

Career highlights and awards
- AL ERA leader (1980)

Rudolph May Jr. (July 18, 1944 – October 19, 2024) was an American professional baseball left–handed pitcher. He played in Major League Baseball (MLB) in 1965 and from 1969 to 1983 for the Los Angeles / California Angels, New York Yankees, Baltimore Orioles, and Montreal Expos. Early in his career, May had a live fastball, but was known best for his sharp-breaking curveball. May was the 1980 American League leader in earned run average (ERA).

== Early years ==
May played high school baseball at Castlemont High School in Oakland, California. One of his high school teammates was future Hall-of-Famer Joe Morgan. Signed by the Minnesota Twins as an amateur free agent in 1962, May was one of the last players in Major League Baseball to be exempt from the later adoption of the Major League Baseball draft (which was formalized in 1964). He pitched in 32 games for Class A Bismarck-Mandan, with 11 wins and 11 losses, pitching 168 innings in 24 games.

In 1963 May was selected first in the 1963 first-year player draft by the Chicago White Sox. He pitched over 300 innings in 1964, split between the Single-A Tidewater Tides and Triple-A Indianapolis Indians, with 17 wins and 8 losses in 207 innings in 30 appearances.

After the 1964 season, May was traded by the White Sox to the Philadelphia Phillies for catcher Bill Heath and a player to be named later (Joel Gibson). The Phillies then traded May to the Los Angeles Angels for pitcher Bo Belinsky.

== Major League Baseball career ==
May made his Major League debut in 1965 at the age of 20, starting for the Los Angeles Angels against the Detroit Tigers. He pitched 9 innings, gave up one run and one hit, struck out 10 batters, walked 5, threw 139 pitches, and received a no-decision. May appeared in 30 games for the Angels in 1965. May pitched in the Angels minor league system from 1966 to 1968, including a stint with the Seattle Angels. He appeared in 45 games over three seasons. He won 18 games and lost 10, in 248 innings.

May returned to the Major Leagues for good in 1969 with the Angels and appeared in 200 games between 1969 and the beginning of the 1974 season as a starter and reliever. Over 1,013 innings, May posted a record of 47 wins and 67 losses with California.

The New York Yankees purchased May's contract from the Angels on June 15, 1974. He posted 22 wins and 16 losses in 326 innings over 49 appearances with the Yankees.

The Yankees traded May with Rick Dempsey, Scott McGregor, Tippy Martinez, and Dave Pagan to the Baltimore Orioles for Ken Holtzman, Doyle Alexander, Elrod Hendricks, Grant Jackson, and Jimmy Freeman at the trade deadline on June 15, 1976. He had fallen out of favor with Yankees manager Billy Martin over being removed prematurely from starts. He appeared in 58 games posting a record of 28 wins and 21 losses over 403 innings with the Orioles.

The Orioles traded May along with Randy Miller, and Bryn Smith to the Montreal Expos for Don Stanhouse, Joe Kerrigan and Gary Roenicke at the Winter Meetings on December 7, 1977. May pitched primarily out of the bullpen for Montreal and recorded 18 wins and 13 losses, appearing in 49 games and recording 237 innings.

May re-signed with the Yankees on November 8, 1979. During the 1980 season with New York, May led the American League with an earned run average of 2.46, which was his best career mark. Through his final four seasons in Major League Baseball, May won 28 games and lost 27.

In 1965 with the Angels, May earned a salary of $6,000. In 1983, his final year with the Yankees, his salary was $620,000.

== Personal life and death ==
When May was 17, he enrolled in an underwater diving program and became a certified diver. Following his professional baseball career, May joined Circle K and worked as a store manager in California.

May died on October 19, 2024, at the age of 80; he had been suffering from diabetes at the time although this was not given as the cause of death.

== See also ==
- List of Major League Baseball annual ERA leaders
