= Bryn Smith =

American baseball player (born 1955)

- Pitcher
- Born: August 11, 1955 (age 70); Marietta, Georgia, U.S.
- Batted: Right Threw: Right

MLB debut
- September 8, 1981, for the Montreal Expos

Last MLB appearance
- June 1, 1993, for the Colorado Rockies

MLB statistics
- Win–loss record: 108–94
- Earned run average: 3.53
- Strikeouts: 1,028
- Stats at Baseball Reference

Teams
- Montreal Expos (1981–1989); St. Louis Cardinals (1990–1992); Colorado Rockies (1993)

Bryn Nelson Smith (born August 11, 1955) is an American former professional baseball player who was a pitcher in Major League Baseball (MLB) from 1981 to 1993.

== Career ==
Selected in the 49th round in 1973 as the 779th player, Smith did not sign with the Cardinals. In the winter of 1974, Smith signed with the Baltimore Orioles.

=== Montreal Expos ===
Smith made his Major League debut with the Montreal Expos after being acquired along with Rudy May and Randy Miller from the Baltimore Orioles for Don Stanhouse, Joe Kerrigan and Gary Roenicke at the Winter Meetings on December 7, 1977. The trade would benefit both teams, as Roenicke became a productive player with the Orioles whilst Smith became a fixture in the Expos rotation for much of the 80s.

Smith made his first start of his career with the Expos on September 29, 1982, against the Philadelphia Phillies. Smith would pitch most of the 1983 season out of the bullpen, but Smith would convert to the rotation full time in August and pitch very well to close out the season. Although Smith recorded a 5–7 record across the last two months of the season, Smith had a 2.36 ERA in 12 starts and 2 relief appearances upon taking up starting duty, including a career high 5 complete games.

Beginning in 1984, Smith earned a full-time spot in the rotation, logging a 3.32 ERA across 179 innings in 28 starts.

1985 would be one of the best seasons of Smith's career, recording a career-best 18–5 record while registering a 2.91 ERA in a career high 222 1/3 innings. He had a pair of 5-game winning streaks in 1985 and was picked Expo Player of the Month for July by Montreal baseball writers after a 3–1 record and 1.74 ERA.

1986 would see Smith regress to a 3.94 ERA across 187 1/3 innings. 1987 would see Smith miss some time, registering only 26 starts, as he logged a career worst 4.37 ERA with the Expos. Smith would be a free agent at the conclusion of both seasons but re-signed with the Expos both times.

After a pair of middling seasons, Smith would return to form in 1988 and 1989. In 1988, Smith had an even 3.00 ERA across 198 innings, and Smith had the lowest walk rate of all qualified pitchers that season. 1989 would see Smith set a career high in strikeouts (129) while registering a 2.84 ERA over 215 2/3 innings pitched, the lowest ERA he ever had as a full-time rotation member. In 1989, he became a subject of teasing when he complained in a Sports Illustrated article about the playing conditions in Montreal, which included the inconvenience of having to drive to Plattsburgh, New York, to buy Dorito chips.

=== St. Louis Cardinals ===
After the 1989 season, Smith became a free agent and signed a 3-year, $6 million deal with the St. Louis Cardinals. Smith would struggle in his first season with the Cardinals, only pitching 141 1/3 innings with a 4.27 ERA. Smith would have his lone full season of pitching with the Cardinals in 1991, delivering a 3.85 ERA over 198 2/3 innings.

1992 would see Smith battle injuries and ineffectiveness, including a return to the bullpen. Pitching just 21 1/3 innings, Smith had a 4–2 record with a 4.64 ERA. He would become a free agent at season's end.

=== Colorado Rockies ===
In the winter of 1992, Smith signed a contract with the new Colorado Rockies. During the spring of 1993, Smith had to undergo arthroscopic knee surgery.

Smith was the first winning pitcher in Colorado Rockies history, defeating Montreal, 11–4, on April 9, 1993. Smith would be moved to the bullpen in May after a string of poor starts, but Smith would continue to struggle. On June 2, 1993, Smith was released by the Colorado Rockies.

He is also the oldest living former Rockies player.

== Legacy ==
Among pitchers who played for the Expos, Smith ranks 3rd all time in wins (81), 3rd all time in innings pitched (1400 1/3), 3rd all time in quality starts (131), and 4th all time in fWAR (20.7).

Among pitchers with at least 1000 innings pitched in the 80s (a sample consisting of 87 eligible pitchers), Smith had the 15th lowest ERA, the 12th lowest walk rate, and the 23rd lowest home run rate.

== Personal life ==
Smith attended Allan Hancock College in Santa Maria, California, where he was an All Western Conference Selection. He takes his first name from the initials of his grandfather, Baxter Robert Young Nisbet.

Smith was the pitching coach for the now-defunct Santa Maria Packers of the Pacific West Baseball League. He also helped start the team.
