= 1978 California Angels season =

Major League Baseball season

1978 California Angels
- League: American League
- Division: West
- Ballpark: Anaheim Stadium
- City: Anaheim, California
- Record: 87–75 (.537)
- Divisional place: 3rd
- Owner: Gene Autry
- General manager: Buzzie Bavasi
- Managers: Dave Garcia, Jim Fregosi
- Television: KTLA
- Radio: KMPC (Dick Enberg, Don Drysdale, Al Wisk)
- Stats: ESPN.com; Baseball Reference

The 1978 California Angels season was the 18th season of the Angels franchise in the American League, the 13th in Anaheim, and their 13th season playing their home games at Anaheim Stadium. The Angels finished the season tied for second in the American League West with a record of 87 wins and 75 losses.

Late in the season, the Angels suffered the loss of outfielder Lyman Bostock when Bostock was murdered on September 23 in Gary, Indiana.

This was the Angels' first winning season since 1970.

== Offseason ==
- November 21, 1977: Lyman Bostock was signed as a free agent by the Angels.
- December 5, 1977: Bobby Bonds, Richard Dotson and Thad Bosley were traded by the Angels to the Chicago White Sox for Brian Downing, Chris Knapp, and Dave Frost.
- December 8, 1977: Jerry Remy was traded by the Angels to the Boston Red Sox for Don Aase and cash.
- January 15, 1978: Gary Nolan was released by the Angels.
- March 20, 1978: Fred Kuhaulua was released by the Angels.
- March 25, 1978: Merv Rettenmund was signed as a free agent by the Angels.

== Regular season ==
On May 12, Angels pitcher Nolan Ryan struck out Buddy Bell for the 2500th strikeout of his career.

=== Season standings ===
AL West
Team	W	L	Pct.	GB	Home	Road
Kansas City Royals	92	70	.568	—	56‍–‍25	36‍–‍45
Texas Rangers	87	75	.537	5	52‍–‍30	35‍–‍45
California Angels	87	75	.537	5	50‍–‍31	37‍–‍44
Minnesota Twins	73	89	.451	19	38‍–‍43	35‍–‍46
Chicago White Sox	71	90	.441	20½	38‍–‍42	33‍–‍48
Oakland Athletics	69	93	.426	23	38‍–‍42	31‍–‍51
Seattle Mariners	56	104	.350	35	32‍–‍49	24‍–‍55

=== Record vs. opponents ===
1978 American League record Sources:
Team	BAL	BOS	CAL	CWS	CLE	DET	KC	MIL	MIN	NYY	OAK	SEA	TEX	TOR
Baltimore	—	7–8	4–6	8–1	9–6	7–8	2–8	7–8	5–5	6–9	11–0	9–1	7–4	8–7
Boston	8–7	—	9–2	7–3	7–8	12–3	4–6	10–5	9–2	7–9	5–5	7–3	3–7	11–4
California	6–4	2–9	—	8–7	6–4	4–7	9–6	5–5	12–3	5–5	9–6	9–6	5–10	7–3
Chicago	1–8	3–7	7–8	—	8–2	2–9	8–7	4–7	8–7	1–9	7–8	7–8	11–4	4–6
Cleveland	6–9	8–7	4–6	2–8	—	5–10	5–6	5–10	5–5	6–9	4–6	8–1	1–9	10–4
Detroit	8–7	3–12	7–4	9–2	10–5	—	4–6	7–8	4–6	4–11	6–4	8–2	7–3	9–6
Kansas City	8–2	6–4	6–9	7–8	6–5	6–4	—	6–4	7–8	6–5	10–5	12–3	7–8	5–5
Milwaukee	8–7	5–10	5–5	7–4	10–5	8–7	4–6	—	4–7	10–5	9–1	5–5	6–4	12–3
Minnesota	5–5	2–9	3–12	7–8	5–5	6–4	8–7	7–4	—	3–7	9–6	6–9	6–9	6–4
New York	9–6	9–7	5–5	9–1	9–6	11–4	5–6	5–10	7–3	—	8–2	6–5	6–4	11–4
Oakland	0–11	5–5	6–9	8–7	6–4	4–6	5–10	1–9	6–9	2–8	—	13–2	6–9	7–4
Seattle	1–9	3–7	6–9	8–7	1–8	2–8	3–12	5–5	9–6	5–6	2–13	—	3–12	8–2
Texas	4–7	7–3	10–5	4–11	9–1	3–7	8–7	4–6	9–6	4–6	9–6	12–3	—	4–7
Toronto	7–8	4–11	3–7	6–4	4–10	6–9	5–5	3–12	4–6	4–11	4–7	2–8	7–4	—

=== Notable transactions ===
- June 6, 1978: 1978 Major League Baseball draft
  - Dave Engle was drafted by the Angels in the 3rd round.
  - Dan Whitmer was drafted by the Angels in the 14th round.

=== Roster ===
1978 California Angels
Roster
Pitchers: 46 Don Aase; 33 Mike Barlow; 34 Ken Brett; 39 John Caneira; 36 Al Fitzmorris; 37 Dave Frost; 38 Tom Griffin; 45 Paul Hartzell; 42 Chris Knapp; 17 Dave LaRoche; 41 Dyar Miller; 30 Nolan Ryan; 40 Frank Tanana	Catchers: 5 Brian Downing; 15 Ike Hampton; 9 Terry Humphrey; Infielders: 14 Jim Anderson; 7 Dave Chalk; 6 Ron Fairly; 4 Bobby Grich; 16 Ron Jackson; 12 Carney Lansford; 35 Dave Machemer; 18 Rance Mulliniks; 27 Tony Solaita	Outfielders: 25 Don Baylor; 10 Lyman Bostock; 19 Ken Landreaux; 3 Rick Miller; 8 Merv Rettenmund; 26 Joe Rudi; Other batters: 20 Danny Goodwin	Manager: 11 Jim Fregosi; 1 Dave Garcia; Coaches: 49 Bob Clear; 24 Marv Grissom; 2 John McNamara; 50 Jimmie Reese; 48 Bob Skinner

== Player stats ==
=== Batting ===
==== Starters by position ====
Note: Pos = Position; G = Games played; AB = At bats; H = Hits; Avg. = Batting average; HR = Home runs; RBI = Runs batted in

Pos	Player	G	AB	H	Avg.	HR	RBI
C	Brian Downing	133	412	105	.255	7	46
1B	Ron Jackson	105	387	115	.297	6	57
2B	Bobby Grich	144	487	122	.251	6	42
SS	Dave Chalk	135	470	119	.253	1	34
3B	Carney Lansford	121	453	133	.294	8	52
LF	Joe Rudi	133	497	127	.256	17	79
CF	Rick Miller	132	475	125	.263	1	37
RF	Lyman Bostock	147	568	168	.296	5	71
DH	Don Baylor	158	591	151	.255	34	99

==== Other batters ====
Note: G = Games played; AB = At bats; H = Hits; Avg. = Batting average; HR = Home runs; RBI = Runs batted in

Player	G	AB	H	Avg.	HR	RBI
Ken Landreaux	93	260	58	.223	5	23
Ron Fairly	91	235	51	.217	10	40
Rance Mulliniks	50	119	22	.185	1	6
Terry Humphrey	53	114	25	.219	1	9
Jim Anderson	48	108	21	.194	0	7
Merv Rettenmund	50	108	29	.269	1	14
Tony Solaita	60	94	21	.223	1	14
Danny Goodwin	24	58	16	.276	2	10
Dave Machemer	10	22	6	.273	1	2
Ike Hampton	19	14	3	.214	1	4

=== Pitching ===
==== Starting pitchers ====
Note: G = Games pitched; IP = Innings pitched; W = Wins; L = Losses; ERA = Earned run average; SO = Strikeouts

Player	G	IP	W	L	ERA	SO
Frank Tanana	33	239.0	18	12	3.65	137
Nolan Ryan	31	234.2	10	13	3.72	260
Chris Knapp	30	188.1	14	8	4.21	126
Don Aase	29	178.2	11	8	4.03	93
Dave Frost	11	80.1	5	4	2.58	30
John Caneira	2	7.2	0	0	7.04	0

==== Other pitchers ====
Note: G = Games pitched; IP = Innings pitched; W = Wins; L = Losses; ERA = Earned run average; SO = Strikeouts

Player	G	IP	W	L	ERA	SO
Paul Hartzell	54	157.0	6	10	3.44	55
Ken Brett	31	100.0	3	5	4.95	43
Tom Griffin	24	56.0	3	4	4.02	35
Al Fitzmorris	9	31.2	1	0	1.71	8

==== Relief pitchers ====
Note: G = Games pitched; W = Wins; L = Losses; SV = Saves; ERA = Earned run average; SO = Strikeouts

Player	G	W	L	SV	ERA	SO
Dave LaRoche	59	10	9	25	2.82	70
Dyar Miller	41	6	2	1	2.66	34
Mike Barlow	1	0	0	0	4.50	1

== Farm system ==
Level	Team	League	Manager
AAA	Salt Lake City Gulls	Pacific Coast League	Deron Johnson
AA	El Paso Diablos	Texas League	Moose Stubing
A	Salinas Packers	California League	Chuck Cottier
A	Quad Cities Angels	Midwest League	Cotton Nash
Rookie	Idaho Falls Angels	Pioneer League	Reuben Rodriguez

LEAGUE CHAMPIONS: El Paso

Records
Preceded by 1977	California Angels seasons 1978	Succeeded by 1979
