= 1977 California Angels season =

Major League Baseball season

1977 California Angels
- League: American League
- Division: West
- Ballpark: Anaheim Stadium
- City: Anaheim, California
- Record: 74–88 (.457)
- Divisional place: 5th
- Owner: Gene Autry
- General manager: Harry Dalton
- Managers: Norm Sherry, Dave Garcia
- Television: KTLA
- Radio: KMPC (Dick Enberg, Don Drysdale, Al Wisk)
- Stats: ESPN.com; Baseball Reference

The 1977 California Angels season was the 17th season of the Angels franchise in the American League, the 12th in Anaheim, and their 12th season playing their home games at Anaheim Stadium. The Angels finished the season fifth in the American League West with a record of 74 wins and 88 losses.

== Offseason ==
On January 6, 1977, Angels utility infielder Mike Miley died in a one-car accident in Baton Rouge, Louisiana.

=== Notable transactions ===
- November 16, 1976: Don Baylor was signed as a free agent by the Angels.
- November 17, 1976: Joe Rudi was signed as a free agent by the Angels.
- November 24, 1976: Bobby Grich was signed as a free agent by the Angels.
- January 11, 1977: Daryl Sconiers was drafted by the Angels in the 3rd round of the 1977 Major League Baseball draft.

== Regular season ==
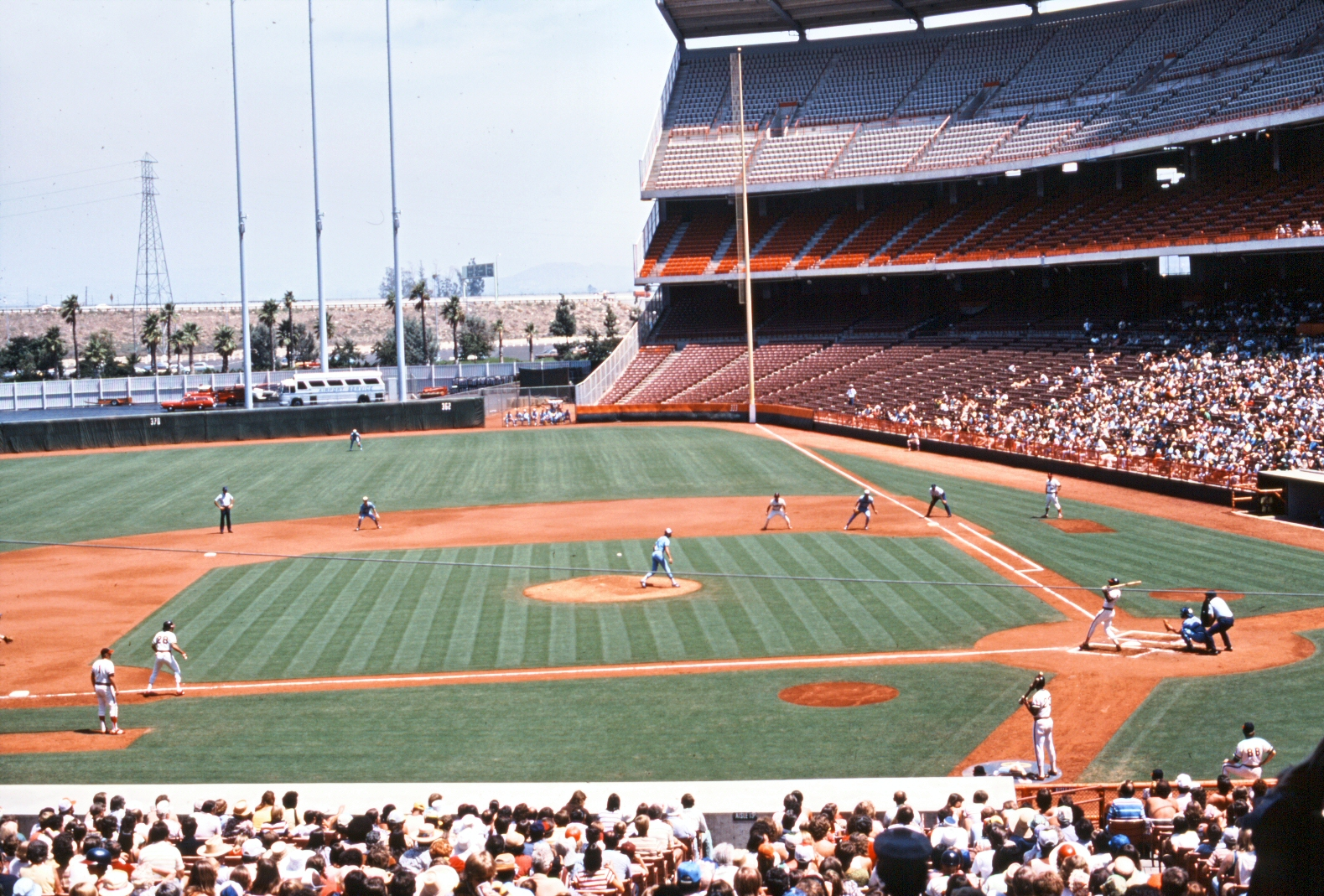
Anaheim Stadium in 1977

=== Season standings ===
AL West
Team	W	L	Pct.	GB	Home	Road
Kansas City Royals	102	60	.630	—	55‍–‍26	47‍–‍34
Texas Rangers	94	68	.580	8	44‍–‍37	50‍–‍31
Chicago White Sox	90	72	.556	12	48‍–‍33	42‍–‍39
Minnesota Twins	84	77	.522	17½	48‍–‍32	36‍–‍45
California Angels	74	88	.457	28	39‍–‍42	35‍–‍46
Seattle Mariners	64	98	.395	38	29‍–‍52	35‍–‍46
Oakland Athletics	63	98	.391	38½	35‍–‍46	28‍–‍52

=== Record vs. opponents ===
1977 American League record Sources:
Team	BAL	BOS	CAL	CWS	CLE	DET	KC	MIL	MIN	NYY	OAK	SEA	TEX	TOR
Baltimore	—	6–8	5–6	5–5	11–4	12–3	4–7	11–4	6–4	8–7	8–2	7–3	4–6	10–5
Boston	8–6	—	7–3	3–7	8–7	9–6	5–5	9–6	4–6	8–7	8–3	10–1	6–4	12–3
California	6–5	3–7	—	8–7	6–4	4–6	6–9	5–5	7–8	4–7	5–10	9–6	5–10	6–4
Chicago	5–5	7–3	7–8	—	6–4	4–6	8–7	6–5	10–5	3–7	10–5	10–5	6–9	8–3
Cleveland	4–11	7–8	4–6	4–6	—	8–7	3–7	11–4	2–9	3–12	7–3	7–3	2–9	9–5
Detroit	3–12	6–9	6–4	6–4	7–8	—	3–8	10–5	5–5	6–9	5–5	5–6	2–8	10–5
Kansas City	7–4	5–5	9–6	7–8	7–3	8–3	—	8–2	10–5	5–5	9–6	11–4	8–7	8–2
Milwaukee	4–11	6–9	5–5	5–6	4–11	5–10	2–8	—	3–8	8–7	5–5	7–3	5–5	8–7
Minnesota	4–6	6–4	8–7	5–10	9–2	5–5	5–10	8–3	—	2–8	8–6	7–8	8–7	9–1
New York	7–8	7–8	7–4	7–3	12–3	9–6	5–5	7–8	8–2	—	9–2	6–4	7–3	9–6
Oakland	2–8	3–8	10–5	5–10	3–7	5–5	6–9	5–5	6–8	2–9	—	7–8	2–13	7–3
Seattle	3–7	1–10	6–9	5–10	3–7	6–5	4–11	3–7	8–7	4–6	8–7	—	9–6	4–6
Texas	6–4	4–6	10–5	9–6	9–2	8–2	7–8	5–5	7–8	3–7	13–2	6–9	—	7–4
Toronto	5–10	3–12	4–6	3–8	5–9	5–10	2–8	7–8	1–9	6–9	3–7	6–4	4–7	—

=== Opening Day lineup ===
1 Jerry Remy 2B
2 Bobby Grich SS
3 Bobby Bonds RF
4 Don Baylor DH
5 Joe Rudi LF
6 Tony Solaita 1B
7 Bruce Bochte CF
8 Dave Chalk 3B
9 Terry Humphrey C
P Frank Tanana

=== Notable transactions ===
- June 7, 1977: 1977 Major League Baseball draft
  - Richard Dotson was drafted by the Angels in the 1st round (7th pick).
  - Brian Harper was drafted by the Angels in the 4th round.
- June 13, 1977: Dick Drago was traded by the Angels to the Baltimore Orioles for Dyar Miller.
- June 15, 1977: Craig Hendrickson (minors) was traded by the Angels to the Cincinnati Reds for Gary Nolan.
- September 16, 1977: Carlos May was purchased by the Angels from the New York Yankees.

=== Roster ===
1977 California Angels
Roster
Pitchers: 33 Mike Barlow; 34 Ken Brett; 39 John Caneira; 35 Mike Cuellar; 41 Dick Drago; 45 Paul Hartzell; 33 Don Kirkwood; 31 Fred Kuhaulua; 17 Dave LaRoche; 41 Dyar Miller; 35 Balor Moore; 38 Gary Nolan; 47 Gary Ross; 30 Nolan Ryan; 19 Mickey Scott; 42,46 Wayne Simpson; 40 Frank Tanana; 48 John Verhoeven; 43 Tom Walker	Catchers: 8 Andy Etchebarren; 15 Ike Hampton; 9 Terry Humphrey; Infielders: 22 Willie Aikens; 21 Dan Briggs; 7 Dave Chalk; 4 Bobby Grich; 11 Mario Guerrero; 16 Ron Jackson; 10 Dave Kingman; 44 Carlos May; 18 Rance Mulliniks; 14,17 Orlando Ramírez; 2 Jerry Remy; 27 Tony Solaita	Outfielders: 12 Don Baylor; 22 Bruce Bochte; 25 Bobby Bonds; 32 Thad Bosley; 28 Gil Flores; 19 Ken Landreaux; 26 Joe Rudi; 3 Rusty Torres; Other batters: 23 Danny Goodwin; 18 Bobby Jones	Manager: 6 Dave Garcia; 37 Norm Sherry; Coaches: 49 Bob Clear (Bullpen); 1 Del Crandall (First base); 8 Andy Etchebarren (Bench); 6 Dave Garcia (Third base); 24 Marv Grissom (Pitching, after 7/13); 24 Billy Muffett (Pitching, until 7/11); 50 Jimmie Reese (Conditioning); 20 Frank Robinson (Hitting)

== Player stats ==
=== Batting ===
==== Starters by position ====
Note: Pos = Position; G = Games played; AB = At bats; H = Hits; Avg. = Batting average; HR = Home runs; RBI = Runs batted in

Pos	Player	G	AB	H	Avg.	HR	RBI
C	Terry Humphrey	123	304	69	.227	2	34
1B	Tony Solaita	116	324	78	.241	14	53
2B	Jerry Remy	154	575	145	.252	4	44
SS	Rance Mulliniks	78	271	73	.269	3	21
3B	Dave Chalk	149	519	144	.277	3	45
LF	Joe Rudi	64	246	64	.264	13	53
CF	Gil Flores	104	342	95	.278	1	26
RF	Bobby Bonds	158	592	156	.264	37	115
DH	Don Baylor	154	561	141	.251	25	75

==== Other batters ====
Note: G = Games played; AB = At bats; H = Hits; Avg. = Batting average; HR = Home runs; RBI = Runs batted in

Player	G	AB	H	Avg.	HR	RBI
Ron Jackson	106	292	71	.243	8	28
Mario Guerrero	86	244	69	.283	1	28
Thad Bosley	58	212	63	.297	0	19
Bobby Grich	52	181	44	.243	7	23
Andy Etchebarren	80	114	29	.254	0	14
Bruce Bochte	25	100	29	.290	2	8
Willie Aikens	42	91	18	.198	0	6
Danny Goodwin	35	91	19	.209	1	8
Rusty Torres	58	77	12	.156	3	10
Ken Landreaux	23	76	19	.250	0	5
Dan Briggs	59	74	12	.162	1	4
Ike Hampton	52	44	13	.295	3	9
Dave Kingman	10	36	7	.194	2	4
Carlos May	11	18	6	.333	0	1
Bobby Jones	14	17	3	.176	1	3
Orlando Ramírez	25	13	1	.077	0	0

=== Pitching ===
==== Starting pitchers ====
Note: G = Games pitched; IP = Innings pitched; W = Wins; L = Losses; ERA = Earned run average; SO = Strikeouts

Player	G	IP	W	L	ERA	SO
Nolan Ryan	37	299.0	19	16	2.77	341
Frank Tanana	31	241.1	15	9	2.54	205
Ken Brett	21	142.0	7	10	4.25	41
Wayne Simpson	27	122.0	6	12	5.83	55
Gary Ross	14	58.1	2	4	5.55	30
Gary Nolan	5	18.1	0	3	8.84	4

==== Other pitchers ====
Note: G = Games pitched; IP = Innings pitched; W = Wins; L = Losses; ERA = Earned run average; SO = Strikeouts

Player	G	IP	W	L	ERA	SO
Paul Hartzell	41	189.1	8	12	3.57	79
John Caneira	6	28.2	2	2	4.08	17
Balor Moore	7	22.2	0	2	3.97	14
Fred Kuhaulua	3	6.1	0	0	15.63	3
Mike Cuellar	2	3.1	0	1	18.90	3

==== Relief pitchers ====
Note: G = Games pitched; W = Wins; L = Losses; SV = Saves; ERA = Earned run average; SO = Strikeouts

Player	G	W	L	SV	ERA	SO
Dave LaRoche	46	6	5	13	3.10	61
Dyar Miller	41	4	4	4	3.02	49
Mike Barlow	20	4	2	1	4.58	25
Dick Drago	13	0	1	2	3.00	15
Don Kirkwood	13	1	0	1	5.09	10
Mickey Scott	12	0	2	0	5.63	5
Sid Monge	4	0	1	1	2.92	4
John Verhoeven	3	0	2	0	3.86	3
Tom Walker	1	0	0	0	9.00	1

== Farm system ==
Level	Team	League	Manager
AAA	Salt Lake City Gulls	Pacific Coast League	Jimy Williams
AA	El Paso Diablos	Texas League	Buck Rodgers
A	Salinas Packers	California League	Moose Stubing
A	Quad Cities Angels	Midwest League	Chuck Cottier
Rookie	Idaho Falls Angels	Pioneer League	Larry Himes

Records
Preceded by 1976	California Angels seasons 1977	Succeeded by 1978
