= 1978 Chicago White Sox season =

1978 Chicago White Sox
- League: American League
- Division: West
- Ballpark: Comiskey Park
- City: Chicago, Illinois
- Owners: Bill Veeck
- General managers: Roland Hemond
- Managers: Bob Lemon, Larry Doby
- Television: WSNS-TV
- Radio: WMAQ (AM) (Harry Caray, Lorn Brown, Jimmy Piersall)

The 1978 Chicago White Sox season was the team's 78th season in Major League Baseball, and its 79th overall. They finished with a record of 71–90, good enough for fifth place in the American League West, 20.5 games behind the first-place Kansas City Royals.

== Offseason ==
- November 28, 1977: Rich Hinton was signed as a free agent by the White Sox.
- December 5, 1977: Brian Downing, Chris Knapp, and Dave Frost were traded by the White Sox to the California Angels for Bobby Bonds, Thad Bosley and Richard Dotson.

== Regular season ==
- Larry Doby replaced Bob Lemon as manager of the White Sox in 1978. Doby was the second African-American to lead a major league club.

=== Opening Day lineup ===
- Ralph Garr, LF
- Jorge Orta, 2B
- Lamar Johnson, 1B
- Bobby Bonds, RF
- Ron Blomberg, DH
- Chet Lemon, CF
- Eric Soderholm, 3B
- Wayne Nordhagen, C
- Don Kessinger, SS
- Steve Stone, P

=== Season standings ===
AL West
Team	W	L	Pct.	GB	Home	Road
Kansas City Royals	92	70	.568	—	56‍–‍25	36‍–‍45
Texas Rangers	87	75	.537	5	52‍–‍30	35‍–‍45
California Angels	87	75	.537	5	50‍–‍31	37‍–‍44
Minnesota Twins	73	89	.451	19	38‍–‍43	35‍–‍46
Chicago White Sox	71	90	.441	20½	38‍–‍42	33‍–‍48
Oakland Athletics	69	93	.426	23	38‍–‍42	31‍–‍51
Seattle Mariners	56	104	.350	35	32‍–‍49	24‍–‍55

=== Record vs. opponents ===
1978 American League record Sources:
Team	BAL	BOS	CAL	CWS	CLE	DET	KC	MIL	MIN	NYY	OAK	SEA	TEX	TOR
Baltimore	—	7–8	4–6	8–1	9–6	7–8	2–8	7–8	5–5	6–9	11–0	9–1	7–4	8–7
Boston	8–7	—	9–2	7–3	7–8	12–3	4–6	10–5	9–2	7–9	5–5	7–3	3–7	11–4
California	6–4	2–9	—	8–7	6–4	4–7	9–6	5–5	12–3	5–5	9–6	9–6	5–10	7–3
Chicago	1–8	3–7	7–8	—	8–2	2–9	8–7	4–7	8–7	1–9	7–8	7–8	11–4	4–6
Cleveland	6–9	8–7	4–6	2–8	—	5–10	5–6	5–10	5–5	6–9	4–6	8–1	1–9	10–4
Detroit	8–7	3–12	7–4	9–2	10–5	—	4–6	7–8	4–6	4–11	6–4	8–2	7–3	9–6
Kansas City	8–2	6–4	6–9	7–8	6–5	6–4	—	6–4	7–8	6–5	10–5	12–3	7–8	5–5
Milwaukee	8–7	5–10	5–5	7–4	10–5	8–7	4–6	—	4–7	10–5	9–1	5–5	6–4	12–3
Minnesota	5–5	2–9	3–12	7–8	5–5	6–4	8–7	7–4	—	3–7	9–6	6–9	6–9	6–4
New York	9–6	9–7	5–5	9–1	9–6	11–4	5–6	5–10	7–3	—	8–2	6–5	6–4	11–4
Oakland	0–11	5–5	6–9	8–7	6–4	4–6	5–10	1–9	6–9	2–8	—	13–2	6–9	7–4
Seattle	1–9	3–7	6–9	8–7	1–8	2–8	3–12	5–5	9–6	5–6	2–13	—	3–12	8–2
Texas	4–7	7–3	10–5	4–11	9–1	3–7	8–7	4–6	9–6	4–6	9–6	12–3	—	4–7
Toronto	7–8	4–11	3–7	6–4	4–10	6–9	5–5	3–12	4–6	4–11	4–7	2–8	7–4	—

=== Notable transactions ===
- April 1, 1978: Royle Stillman was released by the White Sox.
- April 1, 1978: Bob Coluccio was released by the White Sox.
- July 17, 1978: Guy Hoffman was signed as an amateur free agent by the White Sox.

==== Draft picks ====
- June 6, 1978: 1978 Major League Baseball draft
  - Britt Burns was drafted by the White Sox in the 3rd round.
  - Bobby Meacham was drafted by the Chicago White Sox in the 14th round of the 1978 amateur draft, but did not sign.
  - Gary Gaetti was drafted by the White Sox in the 3rd round of the secondary phase, but did not sign.

=== Roster ===
1978 Chicago White Sox
Roster
Pitchers: 46 Francisco Barrios; 41 Ross Baumgarten; 40 Britt Burns; 47 Rich Hinton; 27 Ken Kravec; 55 Jack Kucek; 36 Lerrin LaGrow; 24 Mike Proly; 37 Ron Schueler; 32 Steve Stone; 35 Pablo Torrealba; 33 Steve Trout; 34 Jim Willoughby; 28 Wilbur Wood; 52 Rich Wortham	Catchers: 30 Mike Colbern; 42 Marv Foley; 3 Larry Johnson; 15 Bill Nahorodny; Infielders: 8 Kevin Bell; 10 Ron Blomberg; 3 Jim Breazeale; 1 Harry Chappas; 65 Mike Eden; 31 Joe Gates; 23 Lamar Johnson; 11 Don Kessinger; 17 Junior Moore; 6 Jorge Orta; 16 Greg Pryor; 12 Eric Soderholm; 19 Mike Squires	Outfielders: 7 Alan Bannister; 25 Bobby Bonds; 22 Thad Bosley; 38 Henry Cruz; 48 Ralph Garr; 44 Chet Lemon; 5 Bob Molinaro; 15 Wayne Nordhagen; 25 Tom Spencer; 21 Rusty Torres; 18 Claudell Washington	Manager: 14 Larry Doby; 21 Bob Lemon; Coaches: 14 Larry Doby; 57 Sam Hairston; 29 Bobby Knoop; -- Tony LaRussa; 9 Minnie Miñoso; 31 Stan Williams

== Player stats ==
=== Batting ===
Note: G = Games played; AB = At bats; R = Runs scored; H = Hits; 2B = Doubles; 3B = Triples; HR = Home runs; RBI = Runs batted in; BB = Base on balls; SO = Strikeouts; AVG = Batting average; SB = Stolen bases

Player	G	AB	R	H	2B	3B	HR	RBI	BB	SO	AVG	SB
Alan Bannister, DH, OF, SS, 2B	49	107	16	24	3	2	0	8	11	12	.224	3
Kevin Bell, 3B	54	68	9	13	0	0	2	5	5	19	.191	1
Ron Blomberg, DH, 1B	61	156	16	36	7	0	5	22	11	17	.231	0
Bobby Bonds, RF, DH	26	90	8	25	4	0	2	8	10	10	.278	6
Thad Bosley, OF	66	219	25	59	5	1	2	13	13	32	.269	12
Jim Breazeale, 1B, DH	25	72	8	15	3	0	3	13	8	10	.208	0
Harry Chappas, SS	20	75	11	20	1	0	0	6	6	11	.267	1
Mike Colbern, C	48	141	11	38	5	1	2	20	1	36	.270	0
Henry Cruz, OF	53	77	13	17	2	1	2	10	8	11	.221	0
Mike Eden, SS, 2B	10	17	1	2	0	0	0	0	4	0	.118	0
Marv Foley, C	11	34	3	12	0	0	0	6	4	6	.353	0
Ralph Garr, LF, DH	118	443	67	122	18	9	3	29	24	41	.275	7
Joe Gates, 2B	8	24	6	6	0	0	0	1	4	6	.250	1
Lamar Johnson, 1B, DH	148	498	52	136	23	2	8	72	43	46	.273	6
Larry Johnson, C, DH	3	8	0	1	0	0	0	0	1	4	.125	0
Don Kessinger, SS, 2B	131	431	35	110	18	1	1	31	36	34	.255	2
Chet Lemon, CF, RF, DH	105	357	51	107	24	6	13	55	39	46	.300	5
Bob Molinaro, OF, DH	105	286	39	75	5	5	6	27	19	12	.262	22
Junior Moore, DH, 3B, LF	24	65	8	19	0	1	0	4	6	7	.292	1
Bill Nahorodny, C, 1B, DH	107	347	29	82	11	2	8	35	23	52	.236	1
Wayne Nordhagen, DH, RF, LF, C	68	206	28	62	16	0	5	35	5	18	.301	0
Jorge Orta, 2B	117	420	45	115	19	2	13	53	42	39	.274	1
Greg Pryor, 2B, SS, 3B	82	222	27	58	11	0	2	15	11	18	.261	3
Ron Schueler, PR	1	0	1	0	0	0	0	0	0	0	.000	0
Eric Soderholm, 3B, DH	143	457	57	118	17	1	20	67	39	44	.258	2
Tom Spencer, OF	29	65	3	12	1	0	0	4	2	9	.185	0
Mike Squires, 1B	46	150	25	42	9	2	0	19	16	21	.280	4
Rusty Torres, OF	16	44	7	14	3	0	3	6	6	7	.318	0
Claudell Washington, OF	86	314	33	83	16	5	6	31	12	57	.264	5
Team totals	161	5393	634	1423	221	41	106	595	409	625	.264	83

=== Pitching ===
Note: W = Wins; L = Losses; ERA = Earned run average; G = Games pitched; GS = Games started; SV = Saves; IP = Innings pitched; H = Hits allowed; R = Runs allowed; ER = Earned runs allowed; HR = Home runs allowed; BB = Walks allowed; K = Strikeouts

Player	W	L	ERA	G	GS	SV	IP	H	R	ER	HR	BB	K
Francisco Barrios	9	15	4.05	33	32	0	195.2	180	93	88	13	87	79
Ross Baumgarten	2	2	5.87	7	4	0	23.0	29	15	15	3	9	15
Britt Burns	0	2	12.91	2	2	0	7.2	14	12	11	2	3	3
Rich Hinton	2	6	4.02	29	4	1	80.2	78	38	36	5	30	48
Ken Kravec	11	16	4.08	30	30	0	203.0	188	104	92	22	96	154
Jack Kucek	2	3	3.29	10	5	1	52.0	42	23	19	5	29	30
Lerrin LaGrow	6	5	4.40	52	0	16	88.0	85	47	43	9	38	41
Mike Proly	5	2	2.74	16	6	1	65.2	63	24	20	4	12	19
Ron Schueler	3	5	4.30	30	7	0	81.2	76	50	39	10	41	39
Steve Stone	12	12	4.37	30	30	0	212.0	196	110	103	19	85	118
Pablo Torrealba	2	4	4.71	25	3	1	57.1	69	37	30	6	44	23
Steve Trout	3	0	4.03	4	3	0	22.1	19	10	10	0	11	11
Jim Willoughby	1	6	3.86	59	0	13	93.1	95	41	40	6	21	36
Wilbur Wood	10	10	5.20	28	27	0	168.0	187	103	97	23	75	69
Rich Wortham	3	2	3.05	8	8	0	59.0	59	24	20	1	23	25
Team totals	71	90	4.21	161	161	33	1409.1	1380	731	660	128	604	710

== Farm system ==
Level	Team	League	Manager
AAA	Iowa Oaks	American Association	Joe Sparks
AA	Knoxville Knox Sox	Southern League	Tony LaRussa and Joe Jones
A	Appleton Foxes	Midwest League	Gordon Lund

LEAGUE CHAMPIONS: Knoxville, Appleton
