= Lyman Bostock =

American baseball player (1950–1978)

- Bostock in 1975
- Outfielder
- Born: November 22, 1950; Birmingham, Alabama, U.S.
- Died: September 24, 1978 (aged 27); Gary, Indiana, U.S.
- Batted: Left Threw: Right

MLB debut
- April 8, 1975, for the Minnesota Twins

Last MLB appearance
- September 23, 1978, for the California Angels

MLB statistics
- Batting average: .311
- Home runs: 23
- Runs batted in: 250
- Stats at Baseball Reference

Teams
- Minnesota Twins (1975–1977); California Angels (1978)

Lyman Wesley Bostock Jr. (November 22, 1950 – September 24, 1978) was an American professional baseball player. He played Major League Baseball for four seasons, as an outfielder for the Minnesota Twins (1975–77) and California Angels (1978), with a lifetime average of .311. He batted left-handed and threw right-handed.

Bostock was shot and mortally wounded while riding as a passenger in a vehicle in his hometown of Gary, Indiana, on September 23, 1978, hours after playing against the Chicago White Sox earlier in the day. He died at 1:30 a.m. the next day.

His shooter was sentenced to a psychiatric hospital and released after seven months. After the shooter's release, Indiana legislators introduced the guilty but mentally ill verdict so that mentally ill people would serve prison time after being released from inpatient mental health treatment.

== Early life ==
Born in Birmingham, Alabama, Bostock was the son of Annie Pearl Bostock and Lyman Bostock Sr. (1918–2005), a Negro leagues professional baseball star from 1938 to 1954 as a first baseman. Pearl and Bostock Sr. split when Bostock Jr. was a young child, with Pearl relocating with her son first to Gary, Indiana, in 1954. In 1958, the two again relocated, this time to Los Angeles. The younger Bostock remained estranged from his father for the remainder of his life, feeling that his father had abandoned him.

At one point during his youth, Bostock's baseball glove was stolen. With his mother unable to afford to purchase another, he had to use a glove given to him by a friend of the family. However, the donated glove was for left-handed fielders. Bostock's discomfort in catching fly balls with the hand he was unaccustomed to using led him to begin making basket catches at that time. The habit stayed with him and he frequently made basket catches of fly balls for the remainder of his life. "When I was 8 years old, my mother bought me my first glove," Bostock had recalled. "But someone stole it the next day. My mother wasn't about to buy me another one. But a friend of hers at work gave her a replacement. Unfortunately, it was a left-hander's model and I'm right-handed. Since it was the only glove I had, I had to use it. It was the only way I could catch the ball. It became a habit, and I still have it."

Bostock played baseball at Manual Arts High School in Los Angeles, then attended San Fernando Valley State College (now California State University, Northridge (CSUN)). It was there that he met Yuovene Brooks, who would become his wife. Bostock did not play baseball during his first two years of college, choosing instead to become involved in student activism. Nonetheless, he was selected in the 1970 amateur draft by the St. Louis Cardinals.

"What you saw is what you got from Lyman," said Bob Hiegert, Bostock's college coach at Cal State Northridge. "There was nothing hidden about Lyman. He wore his heart on his sleeve."

Bostock chose not to sign, stayed in college, and began playing baseball for Hiegert and the Matadors. He was an all-conference player in the California Collegiate Athletic Association in both of his seasons at San Fernando Valley, hitting .344 as a junior and .296 as a senior, leading the Matadors to a second-place finish at the Division II College World Series in 1972. He was selected by the Twins in the 26th round (596th overall) of the 1972 amateur draft and decided to turn professional, just 15 credits short of finishing his bachelor's degree.

== Baseball career ==
=== Minor leagues (1972-1974) ===
Bostock's minor league stops were with the Class A Charlotte Twins in 1972; the Class AA Orlando Twins in 1973, and the Class AAA Tacoma Twins in 1974. His batting averages for those years were .294, .313, and .333, respectively. In 1975, he was hitting .391 after 22 games and 92 at bats with Tacoma when the Minnesota Twins called him up.

=== Minnesota Twins (1975-1977) ===
Bostock was promoted to the major leagues in April 1975, making his major league debut on April 8, when he was 1-for-4 with two walks and three runs scored in an 11–4 Twins win over the Texas Rangers. For the season, he batted .282 in 98 games for Minnesota (and .391 in 22 games for the Tacoma Twins in the Pacific Coast League).

A fine defensive center fielder, Bostock finished fourth in the tight American League batting race in 1976, his first full season in the majors. He hit .323, finishing behind the Kansas City Royals' George Brett (.333) and Hal McRae (.332), and teammate Rod Carew (.331). Bostock hit for the cycle on July 24, in a 17–2 Twins victory over the Chicago White Sox.

In 1977, Bostock's .336 batting average was second only to the .388 of Carew. On May 25, Bostock collected 12 putouts in the second game of a doubleheader against the Boston Red Sox, tying the major league mark for putouts by an outfielder, which had been set by Earl Clark of the Boston Braves in 1929, and was equalled by Jacoby Ellsbury in 2009. Bostock had a total of 17 putouts in the doubleheader, which set an American League record for outfielders.

=== Attempt to return salary ===
After the 1977 season ended, Bostock became one of baseball's earliest big-money free agents, signing with the California Angels, owned by Gene Autry. Bostock had made $20,000 with the Twins in 1977 and signed a $2.3 million, six-year contract with the Angels. The Twins, Padres, and Yankees had all tried to sign Bostock. Almost immediately, Bostock donated $10,000 to a church in his native Birmingham, Alabama, to rebuild its Sunday school.

The 1978 season started off poorly for Bostock; he batted .150 for the month of April. Bostock met with the team's management and attempted to return his April salary, saying he had not earned it. The team refused, so Bostock announced he would donate his April salary to charity.

"He came into my office and told me he was reluctant to take his salary," Angels' general manager Buzzy Bavasi recalled. "He said, 'I'm not doing my job.' But I told him, 'I won't let you do that.' And he says, 'Why not?' So I told him, 'What if you hit .600 next month? You're sure as hell not getting any more money out of me.' "

Thousands of requests came in for the money, and Bostock reviewed each one of them, trying to determine who needed it the most. After his poor April, Bostock hit .404 in June and was hitting .296 when he was killed in September.

As the 1978 season neared its conclusion, Bostock was leading the Angels in batting. With a week remaining in the season, he went 2-for-4 with a walk in his final game, a Saturday afternoon game against the White Sox in Chicago, to raise his season average to .296.

In his four-season career, Bostock was a .311 career hitter, with a .365 on-base percentage, 23 home runs, 102 doubles, 30 triples, 45 stolen bases and 250 runs batted in during 526 games. A contact hitter, he had 171 career walks against 174 career strikeouts and a .988 fielding percentage playing all three outfield positions, with the majority in centerfield.

== Shooting death ==
Following the game at Comiskey Park, as he regularly did when in Chicago, Bostock visited his uncle Thomas Turner in nearby Gary, Indiana. After eating a meal with a group of relatives at Turner's home, Bostock and his uncle went to visit Joan Hawkins, a woman whom Bostock had tutored as a teenager, but had not seen for several years. After the visit, Turner agreed to give Hawkins and her sister, Barbara Smith, a ride to their cousin's house. Turner drove his vehicle, with Hawkins seated in the front passenger's seat. Bostock and Barbara Smith rode in the vehicle's back seat.

Barbara Smith had been living with Hawkins while estranged from her husband, Leonard Smith. Unbeknownst to the group, Leonard Smith was outside Hawkins' home in his car, and observed the group's departure in Turner's car. According to Leonard Smith, his wife was frequently unfaithful to him, and though he did not know Bostock, he later said that upon seeing Bostock get into the back seat of Turner's vehicle with his wife, he concluded that the two were having an affair.

At 10:40 p.m. as Turner's vehicle was stopped at a traffic signal at the intersection of 5th and Jackson Streets, Leonard Smith's car pulled up alongside them. Leonard Smith leaned out of his vehicle and fired one round from a .410 caliber shotgun into the back seat of Turner's car, where Bostock and Barbara Smith were seated. Leonard Smith said that his estranged wife was his only intended target; however, Bostock was seated between Barbara Smith and the position from which Leonard Smith was firing. Instead of striking her, the shot struck Bostock squarely in the right temple. At age 27, he died two hours later at a Gary hospital. Barbara Smith was hospitalized in fair condition with pellet wounds to her face.

=== Aftermath and trial ===
Smith was tried twice for murder, with his lawyers arguing that Barbara Smith's alleged infidelity had driven him insane. The first trial resulted in a hung jury. In the second trial, Smith was found not guilty by reason of insanity, and committed for treatment to Logansport State Hospital. Within seven months, he was deemed no longer mentally ill by his psychiatrists and released. Including his time in jail awaiting and during trial, Smith's time in custody amounted to 21 months. In the aftermath of Smith's case, the legislature in Indiana changed the state's insanity laws. After the change, a person found to be insane at the time of the commission of a crime could still be found legally guilty, and thus could be sent to prison if and when he or she was released from psychiatric treatment.

Leonard Smith returned to Gary, Indiana, where he resided for the remainder of his life, moving in his later years in a high-rise apartment building for senior citizens. After his 1980 release from custody, he never again ran afoul of the law and he declined all requests to comment publicly about the killing of Bostock. In 2010, Smith died of natural causes at the age of 64.

Bostock is interred in the Inglewood Park Cemetery in Inglewood, California. "There were never enough hours in the day for Lyman," said Angels teammate Bobby Grich. "We called him 'Jibber-Jabber' because he was always talking. Everyone was crazy about him because he was so outgoing and friendly, always up, always looking on the bright side."

Said Twins teammate Rod Carew: “Lyman Bostock was my teammate on the Twins for three years. I knew he was very close to an uncle who lived in Gary, Indiana. Lyman often visited him after games against the White Sox. How senseless. How horrible. I still can’t believe it happened. Everyone really liked Lyman. When we played the Angels [in 1978], he sent the batboy over to me with a newspaper (The Sporting News) photograph of himself wearing sunglasses with dollar signs on the lenses. Above the picture Lyman had written, Rod, I need help. His average was around .200. So I watched him in the game. I noticed he was lunging at pitches. He was too anxious. His swing wasn’t smooth, as it normally is. I told him I thought he was trying to hit the ball into 'holes' between fielders instead of swinging with the pitch. No one can manipulate a bat so well that he can consistently hit the ball into holes. I don't know if I helped or not, but Lyman picked up and was batting .296 when he died."

In his eulogy at the funeral of Bostock, Angels teammate Ken Brett said, "We called him Jibber Jabber because he enlivened every clubhouse scene, chasing tension, drawing laughter in the darkest hour of defeat. When winning wasn’t in the plan, Lyman knew the sun would come up the next morning…. There’s only one consolation: We’re all better persons for having him touch our lives."

== Honors ==
- The Angels wore a black armband in memory of Bostock for the remainder of the 1978 season.
- A memorial scholarship fund was commissioned in his name, and is annually awarded to a needy CSUN student athlete.
- In 1981, Bostock became the first inductee into the CSU Northridge Matadors Hall of Fame.

== See also ==
- List of baseball players who died during their careers
- List of Major League Baseball players to hit for the cycle
- 27 Club

Achievements
Preceded by Mike Phillips	Hitting for the cycle July 24, 1976	Succeeded by César Cedeño
