= Caneira =

Caneira is a surname. Notable people with the surname include:

- John Caneira (born 1952), American baseball player
- Marco Caneira (born 1979), Portuguese international footballer
