= Kuhaulua =

Kuhaulua is a surname. Notable people with the surname include:

- Fred Kuhaulua (1953–2021), Major League Baseball pitcher
- Jesse Kuhaulua (born 1944), American sumo wrestler
