= Larry Johnson (baseball) =

American baseball player (1950–2013)

- Catcher
- Born: August 17, 1950; Cleveland, Ohio, U.S.
- Died: May 26, 2013 (aged 62); Tampa, Florida, U.S.
- Batted: Right Threw: Right

MLB debut
- October 3, 1972, for the Cleveland Indians

Last MLB appearance
- May 25, 1978, for the Chicago White Sox

MLB statistics
- Batting average: .192
- Home runs: 0
- Runs batted in: 1
- Stats at Baseball Reference

Teams
- Cleveland Indians (1972, 1974); Montreal Expos (1975–1976); Chicago White Sox (1978)

Larry Doby Johnson (August 17, 1950 – May 26, 2013) was an American professional baseball player. A catcher, he appeared in 12 games over five Major League seasons for the Cleveland Indians (1972; 1974), Montreal Expos (1975–76), and Chicago White Sox (1978). Johnson was born in Cleveland, Ohio. He batted and threw right-handed, stood 6 feet (1.8 m) tall and weighed 185 pounds (84 kg). He attended Cleveland State University and Manatee Junior College.

Johnson was named for Larry Doby, the first African-American to play in the American League, a seven-time All-Star outfielder, and member of the Baseball Hall of Fame. Doby was a star for the hometown Cleveland Indians the year of Johnson's birth.

Johnson was selected by the Indians in the ninth round of the 1968 Major League Baseball draft. Although he had a 14-year career in minor league baseball and hit an even 100 career minor league home runs, his longest stint as a major league player was six games for the 1976 Expos. His five MLB hits in 29 plate appearances included two doubles. He drew two bases on balls and was credited with one sacrifice.

However, Johnson and his namesake, Doby, were teammates (with Doby serving as a coach) on three separate MLB clubs during the 1970s: the 1974 Indians, 1976 Expos and 1978 White Sox. Johnson's last game as a major leaguer, on May 25, 1978, preceded by five weeks Doby's July 1 appointment as manager of the White Sox.

Larry Johnson died suddenly on May 26, 2013. His son, Josh, also played professional baseball and coached with the San Diego Padres and Texas Rangers.
