= Bruce Bochte =

American baseball player (born 1950)

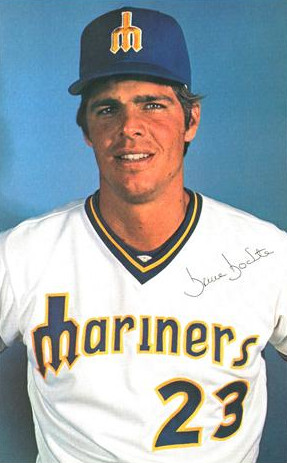
- Bochte in 1978
- First baseman / Left fielder
- Born: November 12, 1950 (age 75); Pasadena, California, U.S.
- Batted: Left Threw: Left

MLB debut
- July 19, 1974, for the California Angels

Last MLB appearance
- October 5, 1986, for the Oakland Athletics

MLB statistics
- Batting average: .282
- Home runs: 100
- Runs batted in: 658
- Stats at Baseball Reference

Teams
- California Angels (1974–1977); Cleveland Indians (1977); Seattle Mariners (1978–1982); Oakland Athletics (1984–1986)

Career highlights and awards
- All-Star (1979)

Bruce Anton Bochte (/ˈbɒktiː/ BOK-tee; born November 12, 1950) is an American former professional baseball first baseman and outfielder who played in Major League Baseball from 1974–1982 and 1984–1986. He played his entire career in the American League for the California Angels, Cleveland Indians, Seattle Mariners and Oakland Athletics. Bochte graduated from Arcadia High School in California and played collegiate ball for the Santa Clara Broncos baseball team until he was drafted by the Angels in the second round (34th overall) of the 1972 Major League Baseball draft.

Bochte was called up to the Angels in 1974 after hitting .355 with nine home runs and 56 RBI in 92 games for the Triple-A Salt Lake City Angels of the Pacific Coast League, and made his major league debut on July 19, 1974. In his first game, Bochte appeared as a pinch runner for Bob Oliver, and scored a run while going 0-for-1 in a 5–4 loss to the Baltimore Orioles. He spent the next four seasons with the Angels, hitting .272 during that span. He batted .290 with two home runs and 8 runs batted in (RBI) to begin the 1977 campaign before being traded along with Sid Monge and cash from the Angels to the Indians for Dave LaRoche and Dave Schuler on May 11. After finishing 1977 with Cleveland, he became a free agent and signed with the Seattle Mariners, who he played with for the next five seasons.

Bochte was selected for the American League All-Star team in 1979 when he hit .316 with 16 home runs and 100 RBI in 150 games and set career highs in virtually every major offensive category. He sat out the entire 1983 season because he "was fed up with the business of baseball and worried about the state of the world", but returned to play with the Oakland Athletics from 1984 to 1986.

In a 12-year, 1,538 game major league career, Bochte compiled a .282 batting average (1,478-for-5,233) with 643 runs, 250 doubles, 21 triples, 100 home runs, 658 RBI, 653 walks, 662 strikeouts, .360 on-base percentage and .396 slugging percentage. Defensively, he recorded a career .991 fielding percentage playing at first base and all three outfield positions. For his college career, he was inducted into the Santa Clara University Athletic Hall of Fame in 1987.

As of 2001, Bochte was an avowed agnostic, and was studying cosmology and working on environmental conservation. He stated that he has no contact with anyone from his playing days except for Dusty Baker. Bochte married twice, and has two daughters from his first marriage.
