= List of Major League Baseball career runs batted in leaders =

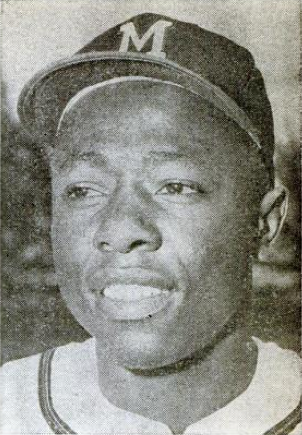
Hank Aaron, career leader in runs batted in (RBIs).

This is a list of Major League Baseball players who have compiled 1,000 runs batted in (RBIs). RBIs are usually accumulated when a batter in baseball enables a runner on base (including himself, in the case of a home run) to score as a result of making contact at-bat (except in certain situations, such as when an error is made on the play or during a double play). A batter is also credited with an RBI if he reaches first base with the bases loaded via a base on balls (walk), being hit by a pitch, or interference.

MLB's official list does not include RBIs accumulated before 1920 when runs batted in became an official statistic. The list on this page is compiled from Baseball-Reference, which credits RBIs from 1907 to 1919 as recorded by baseball writer and historian Ernest Lanigan. One difference between the lists is that Babe Ruth is ranked third by Baseball Reference, but seventh by MLB, which does not count Ruth's 224 RBI compiled before 1920.

As of September 27, 2026, Freddie Freeman is the active leader in career RBIs and 80th overall with 1,392.

== Key ==
| **Rank** | Among leaders in career RBIs. A blank field indicates a tie. |
| **Player (2026 RBIs)** | RBIs in 2026. |
| **RBI** | Career runs batted in. |
| * | denotes elected to National Baseball Hall of Fame. |
| **Bold** | denotes active player. (Note: A player is considered inactive if he has announced his retirement or has not played for a full season.) |

== List ==
- Stats updated through September 27, 2026.

| Rank | Player | RBI |
|---|---|---|
| 1 | Hank Aaron* | 2,297 |
| 2 | Albert Pujols | 2,218 |
| 3 | Babe Ruth* | 2,214 |
| 4 | Alex Rodriguez | 2,086 |
| 5 | Barry Bonds | 1,996 |
| 6 | Lou Gehrig* | 1,995 |
| 7 | Stan Musial* | 1,951 |
| 8 | Ty Cobb* | 1,944 |
| 9 | Jimmie Foxx* | 1,922 |
| 10 | Eddie Murray* | 1,917 |
| 11 | Willie Mays* | 1,909 |
| 12 | Miguel Cabrera | 1,881 |
| 13 | Cap Anson* | 1,879 |
| 14 | Mel Ott* | 1,860 |
| 15 | Carl Yastrzemski* | 1,844 |
| 16 | Ted Williams* | 1,839 |
| 17 | Ken Griffey Jr.* | 1,836 |
| 18 | Rafael Palmeiro | 1,834 |
| 19 | Dave Winfield* | 1,833 |
| 20 | Manny Ramirez | 1,831 |
| 21 | Al Simmons* | 1,828 |
| 22 | Frank Robinson* | 1,812 |
| 23 | David Ortiz* | 1,768 |
| 24 | Honus Wagner* | 1,732 |
| 25 | Adrián Beltré* | 1,707 |
| 26 | Frank Thomas* | 1,704 |
| 27 | Reggie Jackson* | 1,702 |
| 28 | Jim Thome* | 1,699 |
| 29 | Cal Ripken Jr.* | 1,695 |
| 30 | Gary Sheffield | 1,676 |
| 31 | Sammy Sosa | 1,667 |
| 32 | Tony Pérez* | 1,652 |
| 33 | Ernie Banks* | 1,636 |
| 34 | Harold Baines* | 1,628 |
| 35 | Chipper Jones* | 1,623 |
| 36 | Goose Goslin* | 1,612 |
| 37 | Nap Lajoie* | 1,599 |
| 38 | George Brett* | 1,596 |
| 39 | Mike Schmidt* | 1,595 |
| 40 | Andre Dawson* | 1,591 |
| 41 | Carlos Beltrán* | 1,587 |
| 42 | Rogers Hornsby* | 1,584 |
| | Harmon Killebrew* | 1,584 |
| 44 | Al Kaline* | 1,582 |
| 45 | Jake Beckley* | 1,581 |
| 46 | Willie McCovey* | 1,555 |
| 47 | Fred McGriff* | 1,550 |
| 48 | Harry Heilmann* | 1,543 |
| 49 | Willie Stargell* | 1,540 |
| 50 | Joe DiMaggio* | 1,537 |
| 51 | Tris Speaker* | 1,531 |
| 52 | Jeff Bagwell* | 1,529 |
| 53 | Sam Crawford* | 1,523 |
| 54 | Jeff Kent* | 1,518 |
| 55 | Carlos Delgado | 1,512 |
| 56 | Mickey Mantle* | 1,509 |
| 57 | Vladimir Guerrero* | 1,496 |
| 58 | Dave Parker* | 1,493 |
| 59 | Billy Williams* | 1,475 |
| 60 | Ed Delahanty* | 1,466 |
| | Rusty Staub | 1,466 |
| 62 | Eddie Mathews* | 1,453 |
| 63 | Jim Rice* | 1,451 |
| 64 | Joe Carter | 1,445 |
| 65 | Jason Giambi | 1,441 |
| 66 | George Davis* | 1,440 |
| 67 | Luis Gonzalez | 1,439 |
| 68 | Yogi Berra* | 1,430 |
| 69 | Charlie Gehringer* | 1,427 |
| 70 | Andrés Galarraga | 1,425 |
| 71 | Joe Cronin* | 1,424 |
| 72 | Jim Bottomley* | 1,422 |
| 73 | Aramis Ramírez | 1,417 |
| 74 | Mark McGwire | 1,414 |
| 75 | Paul Konerko | 1,412 |

| Rank | Player | RBI |
|---|---|---|
| 76 | José Canseco | 1,407 |
| 77 | Todd Helton* | 1,406 |
| | Robin Yount* | 1,406 |
| 79 | Juan González | 1,404 |
| 80 | **Freddie Freeman (70)** | 1,392 |
| 81 | Torii Hunter | 1,391 |
| 82 | Ted Simmons* | 1,389 |
| 83 | Dwight Evans | 1,384 |
| 84 | Joe Medwick* | 1,383 |
| 85 | Johnny Bench* | 1,376 |
| 86 | Chili Davis | 1,372 |
| 87 | Lave Cross | 1,371 |
| 88 | Garret Anderson | 1,365 |
| | Orlando Cepeda* | 1,365 |
| 90 | Bobby Abreu | 1,363 |
| | Carlos Lee | 1,363 |
| 92 | Brooks Robinson* | 1,357 |
| 93 | Darrell Evans | 1,354 |
| 94 | Gary Gaetti | 1,341 |
| 95 | Johnny Mize* | 1,337 |
| 96 | Mike Piazza* | 1,335 |
| 97 | Duke Snider* | 1,333 |
| 98 | Iván Rodríguez* | 1,332 |
| 99 | Ron Santo* | 1,331 |
| 100 | Carlton Fisk* | 1,330 |
| 101 | Al Oliver | 1,326 |
| 102 | Nelson Cruz | 1,325 |
| 103 | Roger Connor* | 1,322 |
| | Rubén Sierra | 1,322 |
| 105 | Graig Nettles | 1,314 |
| | Pete Rose | 1,314 |
| 107 | Derek Jeter* | 1,311 |
| | Mickey Vernon | 1,311 |
| | Larry Walker* | 1,311 |
| 110 | Paul Waner* | 1,309 |
| 111 | Steve Garvey | 1,308 |
| 112 | Paul Molitor* | 1,307 |
| 113 | Robinson Canó | 1,306 |
| 114 | Roberto Clemente* | 1,305 |
| 115 | Enos Slaughter* | 1,304 |
| 116 | Hugh Duffy* | 1,302 |
| | Miguel Tejada | 1,302 |
| 118 | Eddie Collins* | 1,300 |
| 119 | Sam Thompson* | 1,299 |
| | Mark Teixeira | 1,298 |
| 121 | Dan Brouthers* | 1,296 |
| 122 | Andruw Jones* | 1,289 |
| 123 | Moisés Alou | 1,287 |
| | Scott Rolen* | 1,287 |
| 125 | Del Ennis | 1,284 |
| | **Paul Goldschmidt (52)** | 1,284 |
| 127 | Bob Johnson | 1,283 |
| 128 | Don Baylor | 1,276 |
| | Hank Greenberg* | 1,276 |
| 130 | Gil Hodges* | 1,274 |
| 131 | Pie Traynor* | 1,273 |
| 132 | Tino Martinez | 1,271 |
| 133 | **Nolan Arenado (86)** | 1,270 |
| 134 | Paul O'Neill | 1,269 |
| 135 | Dale Murphy | 1,266 |
| 136 | Edwin Encarnación | 1,261 |
| | Edgar Martínez* | 1,261 |
| 138 | Bernie Williams | 1,257 |
| 139 | Zack Wheat* | 1,248 |
| 140 | Bobby Doerr* | 1,247 |
| 141 | Frankie Frisch* | 1,244 |
| | Lee May | 1,244 |
| 143 | Albert Belle | 1,239 |
| | George Foster | 1,239 |
| 145 | Magglio Ordonez | 1,236 |
| 146 | **Manny Machado (91)** | 1,235 |
| 147 | Lance Berkman | 1,234 |
| 148 | Bill Dahlen | 1,233 |
| 149 | John Olerud | 1,230 |
| 150 | Gary Carter* | 1,225 |

| Rank | Player | RBI |
|---|---|---|
| 151 | Matt Holliday | 1,220 |
| 152 | Matt Williams | 1,218 |
| 153 | Dave Kingman | 1,210 |
| 154 | Bill Dickey* | 1,209 |
| 155 | Bill Buckner | 1,208 |
| | Jim O'Rourke* | 1,208 |
| 157 | Raúl Ibañez | 1,207 |
| 158 | Ellis Burks | 1,206 |
| 159 | Will Clark | 1,205 |
| 160 | Adrián González | 1,202 |
| 161 | Chuck Klein* | 1,201 |
| 162 | Jim Edmonds | 1,199 |
| 163 | Bob Elliott | 1,195 |
| 164 | Julio Franco | 1,194 |
| | Ryan Howard | 1,194 |
| | Joe Kelley* | 1,194 |
| | Tony Lazzeri* | 1,194 |
| 168 | Boog Powell | 1,187 |
| 169 | Joe Torre* | 1,185 |
| 170 | Heinie Manush* | 1,183 |
| | **Giancarlo Stanton (14)** | 1,183 |
| 172 | Robin Ventura | 1,182 |
| 173 | Jack Clark | 1,180 |
| 174 | Gabby Hartnett* | 1,179 |
| 175 | Victor Martinez | 1,178 |
| | George Sisler* | 1,178 |
| | Vic Wertz | 1,178 |
| 178 | Sherry Magee | 1,176 |
| 179 | Craig Biggio* | 1,175 |
| 180 | Vern Stephens | 1,174 |
| | Bobby Veach | 1,174 |
| 182 | Bobby Bonilla | 1,173 |
| 183 | Vada Pinson | 1,169 |
| 184 | Adam Dunn | 1,168 |
| 185 | Steve Finley | 1,167 |
| 186 | Earl Averill* | 1,164 |
| 187 | Willie Horton | 1,163 |
| 188 | Rocky Colavito | 1,159 |
| | Evan Longoria | 1,159 |
| | Alfonso Soriano | 1,159 |
| 191 | **Andrew McCutchen (5)** | 1,157 |
| 192 | Ryan Braun | 1,154 |
| 193 | B. J. Surhoff | 1,153 |
| 194 | Rudy York | 1,149 |
| 195 | Roy Sievers | 1,147 |
| 196 | Mark Grace | 1,146 |
| 197 | Joey Votto | 1,144 |
| 198 | Dante Bichette | 1,141 |
| | Ken Boyer | 1,141 |
| 200 | Ron Cey | 1,139 |
| | Johnny Damon | 1,139 |
| 202 | Tony Gwynn* | 1,138 |
| | **Bryce Harper (87)** | 1,138 |
| 204 | Tommy Corcoran | 1,137 |
| 205 | **Carlos Santana (0)** | 1,136 |
| 206 | Roberto Alomar* | 1,134 |
| 207 | Joe Morgan* | 1,133 |
| 208 | Greg Luzinski | 1,128 |
| 209 | Cecil Cooper | 1,125 |
| | Tim Wallach | 1,125 |
| 211 | Ed McKean | 1,124 |
| 212 | Joe Adcock | 1,122 |
| 213 | Bobby Wallace* | 1,121 |
| 214 | Dick Allen* | 1,119 |
| | Frank Howard | 1,119 |
| 216 | Luke Appling* | 1,116 |
| 217 | Rickey Henderson* | 1,115 |
| 218 | George Hendrick | 1,111 |
| | Fred Lynn | 1,111 |
| 220 | Todd Zeile | 1,110 |
| 221 | Buddy Bell | 1,106 |
| | Wally Joyner | 1,106 |
| 223 | Vinny Castilla | 1,105 |
| 224 | Norm Cash | 1,104 |
| 225 | Larry Doby* | 1,099 |

| Rank | Player | RBI |
|---|---|---|
| | Don Mattingly | 1,099 |
| 227 | Hal McRae | 1,097 |
| 228 | **Salvador Perez (78)** | 1,094 |
| 229 | Jimmy Ryan | 1,093 |
| 230 | Reggie Smith | 1,092 |
| 231 | Minnie Miñoso* | 1,089 |
| 232 | Kent Hrbek | 1,086 |
| 233 | Kirby Puckett* | 1,085 |
| 234 | Lou Whitaker | 1,084 |
| 235 | Brian Giles | 1,078 |
| | Derrek Lee | 1,078 |
| | Bill Terry* | 1,078 |
| 238 | José Cruz | 1,077 |
| | Charlie Grimm | 1,077 |
| | Sam Rice* | 1,077 |
| 241 | Pinky Higgins | 1,075 |
| 242 | Brian Downing | 1,073 |
| 243 | Jermaine Dye | 1,072 |
| | Bid McPhee* | 1,072 |
| | **Mike Trout (54)** | 1,072 |
| | Greg Vaughn | 1,072 |
| 247 | Jeff Conine | 1,071 |
| | Keith Hernandez | 1,071 |
| | J. D. Martinez | 1,071 |
| | Bob Meusel | 1,071 |
| 251 | Shawn Green | 1,070 |
| | Lance Parrish | 1,070 |
| 253 | Jimmie Dykes | 1,069 |
| 254 | Kiki Cuyler* | 1,065 |
| | Jorge Posada | 1,065 |
| | Ken Singleton | 1,065 |
| 257 | Mo Vaughn | 1,064 |
| 258 | Stuffy McInnis | 1,063 |
| | Hack Wilson* | 1,063 |
| 260 | Ryne Sandberg* | 1,061 |
| | Ryan Zimmerman | 1,061 |
| 262 | Carl Furillo | 1,058 |
| 263 | Herman Long | 1,055 |
| 264 | Joe Sewell* | 1,054 |
| 265 | Willie Davis | 1,053 |
| 266 | Tommy Davis | 1,052 |
| 267 | George Scott | 1,051 |
| 268 | Joe Kuhel | 1,049 |
| 269 | Nick Markakis | 1,046 |
| 270 | Ron Fairly | 1,044 |
| 271 | Bobby Murcer | 1,043 |
| 272 | Sal Bando | 1,039 |
| 273 | Joe Judge | 1,034 |
| 274 | Matt Kemp | 1,031 |
| 275 | Michael Young | 1,030 |
| 276 | Prince Fielder | 1,028 |
| | Ted Kluszewski | 1,028 |
| 278 | Eric Karros | 1,027 |
| 279 | Bobby Thomson | 1,026 |
| 280 | Chase Utley | 1,025 |
| 281 | Bobby Bonds | 1,024 |
| 282 | **Eugenio Suárez** **(74)** | 1,023 |
| | Dixie Walker | 1,023 |
| 284 | Travis Fryman | 1,022 |
| | Yadier Molina | 1,022 |
| 286 | Bret Boone | 1,021 |
| | Fred Pfeffer | 1,021 |
| 288 | George Kelly* | 1,020 |
| 289 | Roy Campanella* | 1,019 |
| 290 | Brian McCann | 1,018 |
| 291 | David Justice | 1,017 |
| 292 | Tim Salmon | 1,016 |
| 293 | Rod Carew* | 1,015 |
| | Fred Clarke* | 1,015 |
| | Ralph Kiner* | 1,015 |
| | George Van Haltren | 1,015 |
| 297 | Wade Boggs* | 1,014 |
| 298 | Dusty Baker | 1,013 |
| 299 | Hal Trosky | 1,012 |
| 300 | Turkey Stearnes* | 1,009 |

| Rank | Player | RBI |
|---|---|---|
| 301 | Cecil Fielder | 1,008 |
| | Ron Gant | 1,008 |
| 303 | Amos Otis | 1,007 |
| 304 | Cy Williams | 1,005 |
| 304 | Wally Pipp | 1,004 |
| 306 | Alan Trammell* | 1,003 |
| | Justin Upton | 1,003 |
| 308 | George Bell | 1,002 |
| | **José Ramírez (53)** | 1,002 |
| 310 | Darryl Strawberry | 1,000 |

Through September 27, 2026, these active players have at least 850 RBI.

- Mookie Betts (982) 69 in 2026
- Marcell Ozuna (977) 29 in 2026
- Nick Castellanos (940) 20 in 2026
- Jose Altuve (939) 50 in 2026
- Christian Yelich (910) 59 in 2026
- Francisco Lindor (905) 49 in 2026
- Matt Olson (901) 93 in 2026
- Xander Bogaerts (895) 57 in 2026
- Kyle Schwarber (881) 97 in 2026
- Aaron Judge (871) 41 in 2026
- Marcus Semien (850) 49 in 2026
- George Springer (850) 54 in 2026
