= Brian Downing =

American baseball player (born 1950)

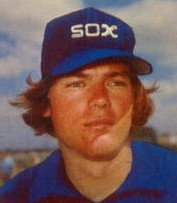
- Downing c. 1977
- Designated hitter / Left fielder / Catcher
- Born: October 9, 1950 (age 75); Los Angeles, California, U.S.
- Batted: Right Threw: Right

MLB debut
- May 31, 1973, for the Chicago White Sox

Last MLB appearance
- October 4, 1992, for the Texas Rangers

MLB statistics
- Batting average: .267
- Hits: 2,099
- Home runs: 275
- Runs batted in: 1,073
- Stats at Baseball Reference

Teams
- Chicago White Sox (1973–1977); California Angels (1978–1990); Texas Rangers (1991–1992)

Career highlights and awards
- All-Star (1979); Angels Hall of Fame

Brian Jay Downing (born October 9, 1950) is an American former professional baseball player. He played in Major League Baseball from 1973 to 1992, originally as a catcher before converting to an outfielder and designated hitter later in his career.

Downing spent the majority of his baseball career as a member of the California Angels, helping them win their first American League Western Division title in 1979 and then two more division titles in 1982 and 1986. When he left the Angels in 1990, he was the team's all-time leader in almost every major offensive category. Downing was inducted into the California Angels Hall of Fame in 2009. He also played for the Chicago White Sox and the Texas Rangers.

== Baseball career ==
=== Chicago White Sox (1973–1977) ===
Downing played at Magnolia High School in Anaheim, California, and was originally cut from his high school team. Although he was on the "taxi squad" as a bullpen catcher, he failed to make the team at Cypress College. However, he had an impressive showing at an "all comers" Chicago White Sox tryout, and scout Bill Lentini signed him as an amateur free agent on August 19, 1969. His early career with the White Sox (1973–1977) was not promising. On the first pitch of his first inning in his first Major League game, he severely damaged his knee making a diving catch near third base, sliding down the dugout steps and landing on the 60-day DL. He hit .225 as a rookie catcher (1974), and .240 in his second year, with seven home runs in 138 games.

=== California Angels (1978–1990) ===
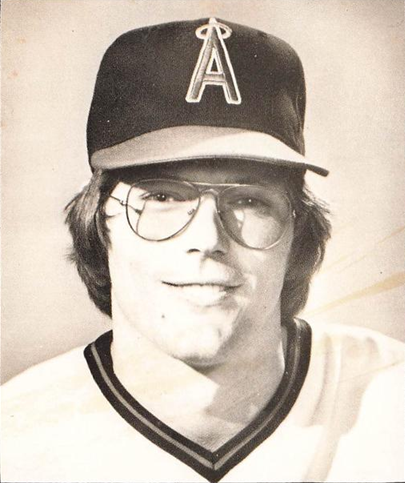
1978 card of Downing for California Angels

Downing was dealt along with Chris Knapp and Dave Frost from the White Sox to the California Angels for Bobby Bonds, Richard Dotson, and Thad Bosley on December 5, 1977. The trade allowed him to return home to Southern California and avoid the pressures of Chicago fans' expectations. It also gave his career new life. Although his 1978 numbers were uninspiring (.255 batting average, 7 home runs, 46 runs batted in), in the offseason he committed to serious weight training and in 1979 dramatically changed his batting stance, hit .326 (third in the American League), and made the AL All-Star team for the first and only time.

A broken ankle in 1980 forced him to move from catcher to the outfield beginning in 1981 because his offense was so valuable. Although his range was not great for an outfielder, Downing's hard work and steady hands allowed him to play the entire 1982 and 1984 seasons without making an error. He also set a pair of AL records with 244 errorless games by an OF (5/25/81 – 7/21/83), and most chances (330) in an errorless season (1982). His continued weight training helped him hit 20+ home runs in six of the seven seasons from 1982 to 1988. He became the Angels' full-time designated hitter in 1987, when he led the American League with 106 walks.

When he played his last game for the Angels after 13 seasons, he was their career leader in games, at bats, runs, hits, total bases, doubles, home runs, runs batted in, singles, extra base hits, hit by pitches, sacrifice flies and bases on balls.

On April 9, 2009, Downing was to be inducted into the Angels Hall of Fame along with former teammate Chuck Finley before the start of the game that day. However, due to the death of Angels rookie pitcher Nick Adenhart, the ceremony and game were postponed until August 27.

=== Texas Rangers (1991–1992) ===
Downing played his final two seasons with the Texas Rangers as a designated hitter. He retired at age 41, getting his last hit on the last day of the 1992 season – a single off Angels' pitcher Bert Blyleven.

He finished his career with a .267 average, 275 home runs, 1073 runs batted in, and 1188 runs scored. He was an American League All-Star in 1979 when he hit .326 with 12 home runs, 75 runs batted in, and 81 runs scored. His best all-around season came in 1982 when he hit 28 home runs, had 84 runs batted in, scored 109 runs and hit .281. Downing set single-season career highs with 95 runs batted in during 1986 and 29 home runs, 110 runs scored and an American League-leading 106 walks in 1987.

=== Outside baseball ===
In 1985 Downing made a cameo appearance on The Jeffersons in a scene in which Louise Jefferson sneaks into the Angels' locker-room looking for Reggie Jackson.

== See also ==
- List of Major League Baseball career home run leaders
- List of Major League Baseball career hits leaders
- List of Major League Baseball career runs scored leaders
- List of Major League Baseball career runs batted in leaders
