= Bobby Bonds =

American baseball player (1946–2003)

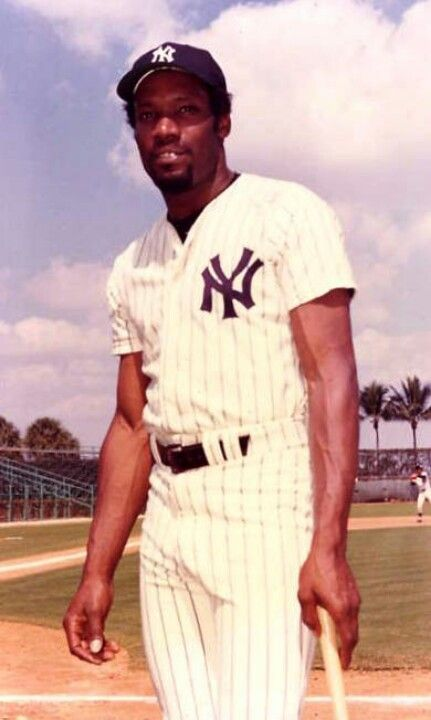
- Bonds with the New York Yankees in 1975
- Right fielder
- Born: March 15, 1946; Riverside, California, U.S.
- Died: August 23, 2003 (aged 57); San Carlos, California, U.S.
- Batted: Right Threw: Right

MLB debut
- June 25, 1968, for the San Francisco Giants

Last MLB appearance
- October 4, 1981, for the Chicago Cubs

MLB statistics
- Batting average: .268
- Home runs: 332
- Runs batted in: 1,024
- Stolen bases: 461
- Stats at Baseball Reference

Teams
- As player: San Francisco Giants (1968–1974); New York Yankees (1975); California Angels (1976–1977); Chicago White Sox (1978); Texas Rangers (1978); Cleveland Indians (1979); St. Louis Cardinals (1980); Chicago Cubs (1981); As coach: Cleveland Indians (1984–1987); San Francisco Giants (1993–1996)

Career highlights and awards
- 3× All-Star (1971, 1973, 1975); 3× Gold Glove Award (1971, 1973, 1974); San Francisco Giants Wall of Fame

Bobby Lee Bonds (March 15, 1946 – August 23, 2003) was an American right fielder in Major League Baseball from 1968 to 1981. He played for the San Francisco Giants, New York Yankees, California Angels, Chicago White Sox, Texas Rangers, Cleveland Indians, St. Louis Cardinals, and Chicago Cubs.

Noted for his combination of power hitting and speed, he was the first player to have more than two seasons of 30 home runs and 30 stolen bases, doing so a record five times (the record was matched only by his son Barry) and was the first to accomplish the feat in both major leagues. He became the second player to hit 300 career home runs and steal 300 bases, joining Willie Mays. Together with Barry, he is part of baseball's most renowned father-son combination, holding the record for combined home runs, RBIs and stolen bases. A prolific leadoff hitter, he also set major league records for most times leading off a game with a home run in a career (35) and a season (11, in 1973), both records that have since been broken.

== Early life ==
Born in Riverside, California, Bonds played varsity high school baseball at Riverside Polytechnic High School.

== Professional career ==
=== Minor leagues ===
Bonds signed with the Giants in 1964. Playing in the Giants' minor league system, he was Most Valuable Player of the class-A Western Carolinas League.

=== San Francisco Giants (1968–1974) ===
Bonds was on the San Francisco Giants from 1968-1974. During his career with the Giants, he hit a grand slam in his third at bat in his first major league game, June 25, 1968, becoming just the second player, and the first in MLB's modern era, to hit a grand slam in his debut game. The first was Bill Duggleby in 1898. Bonds was named to the 1968 Topps All-Star Rookie Team.

Bonds was remarkable during this era for his combination of power and speed but also for his propensity to strike out.

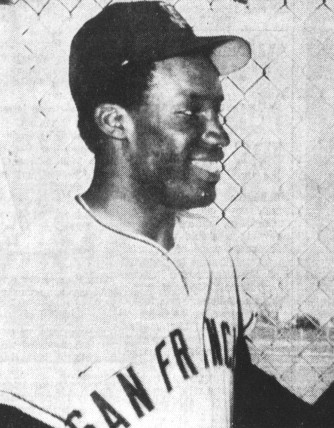
Bonds, circa 1969

In his first full season in 1969, he set a major league record with 187 strikeouts, while also leading the NL in runs. He broke his own strikeout record a year later with 189. That record lasted until 2004, when Adam Dunn broke it by striking out 195 times. This mark now belongs to Colson Montgomery with 227 in 2026. Bonds' 1970 total currently ranks tenth on the all-time single-season strikeout list. When Bonds retired, he ranked third in career strikeouts with 1,757, behind Willie Stargell's 1,912 and Reggie Jackson's 1,810. Bobby Bonds hit 39 home runs and had 43 stolen bases in 1973—the highest level of home runs and stolen bases (39+ of each) until José Canseco of the Oakland Athletics in 1988. Barry and Bobby had 1,094 combined home runs through 2007—a record for a father-son combination. He was a three-time Gold Glove Award winner (1971, 1973–74), and a three-time All-Star (1971, 1973 and 1975, winning the All-Star MVP award in 1973).

In 1970, he stole a career-high 48 bases, the highest total by a Giant since Frankie Frisch in 1921. Bonds was second in the NL in runs (134), third in triples (10) and stolen bases (48) and fourth in doubles (36) and total bases (334). He also set a major league record with 189 strikeouts, which stood for 34 years until it was broken in 2004 by Adam Dunn.

In 1971, he finished fourth in the NL in runs batted in and second in runs, leading the Giants with a .288 average as they won the National League West title, earning their first postseason berth since the 1962 World Series. A bruised rib cage limited his play in the 1971 NLCS, his only postseason appearance. He was a late-inning replacement for rookie Dave Kingman in Game 1 and did not play in Game 2 before starting the final two games, batting 2-for-8 in the series. That season, he placed fourth in the NL MVP award voting. In 1972, Bonds scored 118 runs, which was second in the NL (the third straight season he was second in runs scored) and his 26 home runs was ninth in the circuit while his 44 stolen bases was 4th in the league. In 1973, he placed third in the MVP voting after hitting a career-high 39 home runs, 11 of them to start a game and leading the league in runs a second time. Bonds was named the NL Player of the Year by The Sporting News in 1973 and was also named an outfielder on TSN's American League All-Star Team in 1977.

=== New York Yankees (1975) ===
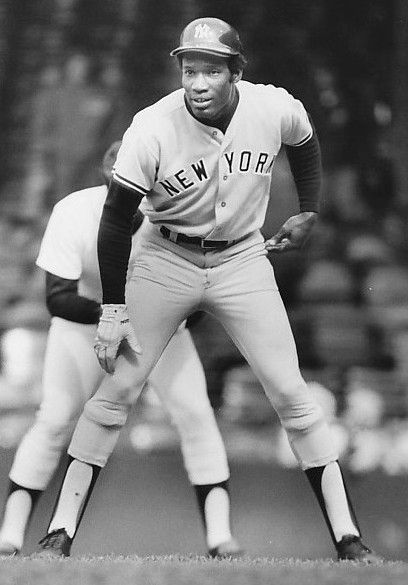
Bonds in 1975

After the 1974 season, the Giants traded Bonds to the New York Yankees for Bobby Murcer.

In 1975, Bonds broke Eddie Yost's career record of 28 leadoff home runs. His eventual record of 35 stood until Rickey Henderson broke it in 1989, and his NL record of 30 was broken by Craig Biggio in 2003. His single-season mark of 11 was broken by Brady Anderson in 1996. His 32 home runs was fourth in the AL and his 30 stolen bases were eighth in the league. He was voted honorable mention on AP's All-MLB team.

=== California Angels (1976–1977) ===
With the Angels needing right-handed power hitters, he was acquired from the Yankees for Mickey Rivers and Ed Figueroa on December 11, 1975. In 1977, he tied the Angels club record for home runs in a season (37).

=== Chicago White Sox (1978) ===
Bonds was acquired along with Richard Dotson and Thad Bosley by the Chicago White Sox from the Angels for Brian Downing, Chris Knapp and Dave Frost on December 5, 1977. The transaction was part of Bill Veeck and Roland Hemond's rent-a-player strategy in which they attempted to get one productive campaign from a star player who was expected to become a free agent at season's end. It had worked the previous year when Richie Zisk and Oscar Gamble helped to keep the White Sox in contention into September but it failed when the team opened 1978 with Bonds as its right fielder and a 9–20 start.

=== Texas Rangers (1978) ===
He was sent to the Texas Rangers for Claudell Washington and Rusty Torres on May 16, 1978.

=== Cleveland Indians (1979) ===
Bonds, along with Len Barker, was dealt from the Rangers to the Cleveland Indians for Jim Kern and Larvell Blanks on October 3, 1978. In his one season with Cleveland, he hit his 300th career home run.

=== St. Louis Cardinals (1980) ===
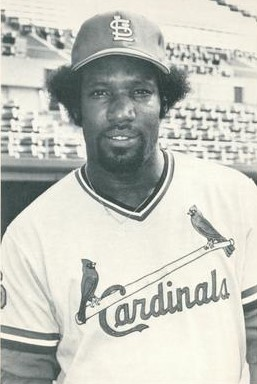
Bonds in 1980

His trade to the St. Louis Cardinals for John Denny and Jerry Mumphrey on December 7, 1979, was the sixth in just over five years.

=== Chicago Cubs (1981) ===
After his contract was purchased by the Chicago Cubs from the Rangers on June 4, 1981, he had played with eight different MLB teams in eight years. This prompted a line in the lyrics to Terry Cashman's 1981 hit song "Talkin' Baseball", in which the line in part reads "And Bobby Bonds can play for everyone." In the first inning of his first game with the Cubs, Bonds tripped on a seam in the artificial turf at Three Rivers Stadium in Pittsburgh and broke a bone in his wrist. He went on the 21-day disabled list and didn't play again until after the 1981 Major League Baseball strike.

=== St. Lucie Legends (1989) ===
Bonds joined the St. Lucie Legends of the newly formed Senior Professional Baseball Association in 1989, playing for one season as well as managing for the second half of the season. The club folded after their inaugural season and the league folded during the second season.

=== Legacy ===
Bonds' 461 career stolen bases ranked 12th in major league history upon his retirement. He was hitting instructor for the Indians from 1984 to 1987, and rejoined the Giants as a coach in 1993 when his son Barry signed with the team as a free agent. As a player, coach, scout and front-office employee, he was with the Giants franchise for 23 seasons. Barry Bonds is the only other player in major league history to hit 300 home runs and steal 400 bases, and also the only other player to have five 30–30 seasons.

Eleven times Bonds was in his league's top 10 in stolen bases, with eight of those seasons in the top six. Seven times he was among the league top ten home run hitters and nine times he was among the top ten in runs scored, leading the NL in 1971 and 1973. He was in the top ten in total bases eight times, leading the NL in 1973. He had as of 2018 the fifth-highest career power–speed number, behind his son Barry, Rickey Henderson, Willie Mays, and Alex Rodriguez, at 386.0.

== Personal life ==
His brother, Robert, won two gold medals in the hurdles at the high school track and field state finals in 1960, and was an NFL draft pick in 1965. In 1964, Bobby was a High School All-American in track & field, while also being named Southern California High School Athlete of the Year. His sister, Rosie, was a 1964 Olympic hurdler.

On May 3, 1963, he married Patricia Howard. They had three sons: Barry went on to become one of the greatest major league players of all time, and Rick and Bobby Jr., who played eleven years of pro ball but never made it to the major leagues.

Bonds had an addiction to alcohol that saw him join Alcoholics Anonymous after his career ended.

Bonds died of complications from lung cancer and a brain tumor at age 57 in San Carlos, California. He is interred at Skylawn Memorial Park in San Mateo, California.

== See also ==
- List of Major League Baseball career home run leaders
- List of Major League Baseball career runs scored leaders
- List of Major League Baseball career runs batted in leaders
- 30–30 club
- List of Major League Baseball annual runs scored leaders
- List of Major League Baseball career stolen bases leaders

Preceded by	Cleveland Indians Hitting Coach; 1984–1987	Succeeded by Charlie Manuel
Preceded by Dusty Baker	San Francisco Giants Hitting Coach; 1993–1996	Succeeded by Gene Clines
