= Chris Knapp (baseball) =

American baseball player (born 1953)

- Pitcher
- Born: September 16, 1953 (age 72); Cherry Point, North Carolina, U.S.
- Batted: Right Threw: Right

MLB debut
- September 4, 1975, for the Chicago White Sox

Last MLB appearance
- October 5, 1980, for the California Angels

MLB statistics
- Win–loss record: 36–32
- Earned run average: 4.99
- Strikeouts: 355
- Stats at Baseball Reference

Teams
- Chicago White Sox (1975–1977); California Angels (1978–1980)

Robert Christian Knapp (born September 16, 1953) is an American former professional baseball right-handed pitcher, whose career totals include 122 Major League Baseball (MLB) games pitched, for the Chicago White Sox (1975–1977) and California Angels (1978–1980). He won 12 and 14 games, respectively, in back-to-back seasons (1977–1978). Knapp stood 6 ft 5 in (1.96 m) and weighed 195 lb (88 kg).

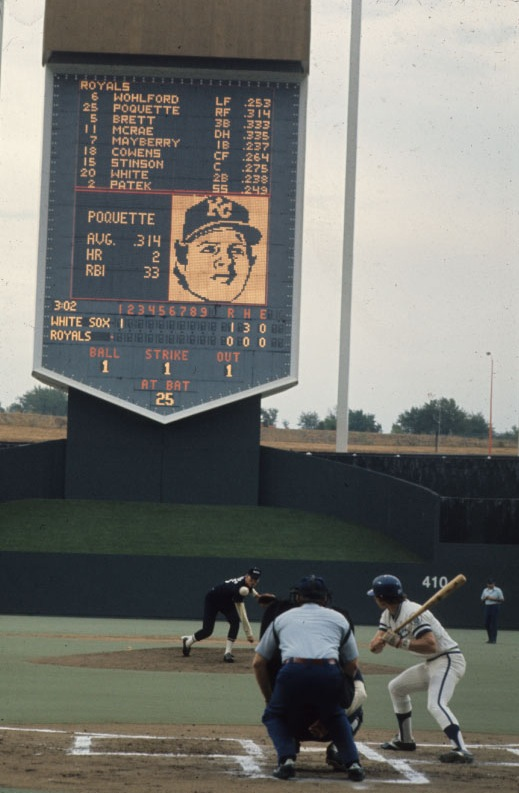
Chris Knapp pitching to Tom Poquette at Royals Stadium on September 19, 1976.

After graduating from Central Michigan University, Knapp was selected in the first round of the 1975 Major League Baseball draft by the White Sox. He played parts of the 1975, 1976, and 1977 seasons with Chicago, although most of his time in the first two years of his career was spent in the White Sox farm system. In 1977 he appeared in five games for the Triple-A Iowa Oaks, and worked in 27 MLB games for the White Sox, 26 as a starting pitcher, posting a 12–7 record with four complete games. He was traded along with Brian Downing and Dave Frost to the Angels for Bobby Bonds, Richard Dotson and Thad Bosley on December 5, 1977. Knapp then worked in 30 games for the 1978 Angels, 29 as a starter, and posted a 14–8 mark with six complete games.

In 1979 and 1980, however, his effectiveness diminished, as he could win only seven of 23 decisions and his earned run average ballooned to 5.51 and 6.14, respectively. He was sent to the minor leagues in 1981. Knapp finished his career in the minors during the 1983 season, going winless in four starts.

During his MLB career, Knapp allowed 642 hits and 250 bases on balls in 604 1/3 innings pitched, with 355 strikeouts and 15 total complete games.
