= Dave Frost =

American baseball player (1952–2023)

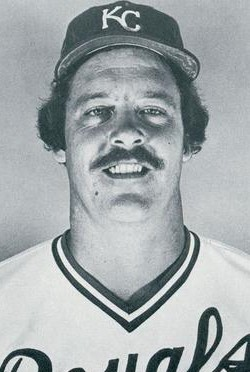
- Pitcher
- Born: November 17, 1952; Long Beach, California, U.S.
- Died: April 14, 2023 (aged 70); Westminster, California, U.S.
- Batted: Right Threw: Right

MLB debut
- September 11, 1977, for the Chicago White Sox

Last MLB appearance
- October 3, 1982, for the Kansas City Royals

MLB statistics
- Win–loss record: 33–37
- Earned run average: 4.10
- Strikeouts: 222
- Stats at Baseball Reference

Teams
- Chicago White Sox (1977); California Angels (1978–1981); Kansas City Royals (1982)

Carl David Frost (November 17, 1952 – April 14, 2023) was an American Major League Baseball pitcher. The 6 ft 6 in (1.98 m), 235 lb (107 kg) right-hander was drafted by the Chicago White Sox in the 18th round of the 1974 Major League Baseball draft. During a five-year Major League career, Frost played for the White Sox (1978), the California Angels (1978–1981), and the Kansas City Royals (1982).

== Career ==
Frost made his MLB debut on September 11, 1977, against the California Angels at Anaheim Stadium. He turned in a quality start, pitching 6 1/3 innings and giving up just two earned runs. He struck out three, walked none, and received a no decision in the 5–4 White Sox loss. His first big league win came a week later in another start against the Angels, this time at Comiskey Park. He went 7 2/3 innings, gave up three runs, and won 7–3.

Frost was traded along with Brian Downing and Chris Knapp to the Angels for Bobby Bonds, Richard Dotson, and Thad Bosley on December 5, 1977. He split time between the Salt Lake City Gulls of the Pacific Coast League and the big leagues in 1978, and went 5–4 with a 2.58 earned run average (ERA) in 11 games (ten starts) for the Angels.

Frost had his biggest year in 1979. He won 16, lost 10, and led Angels starters in ERA (3.57), winning percentage (.615), and innings pitched (239 1/3). California had an impressive group of starters that year, including Frost, Nolan Ryan, Don Aase, Jim Barr, Chris Knapp, and Frank Tanana. They ultimately won the American League West Division pennant that year with an 88–74 record.

Elbow problems severely limited Frost's effectiveness for the remainder of his career. In the next three seasons (two with the Angels and one with the Kansas City Royals) he was a combined 11–22 with a 5.43 ERA.

Frost's career totals for 99 games pitched include a 33–37 record, 84 games started, 16 complete games, 3 shutouts, 1 save, and 7 games finished. He allowed 251 earned runs in 550 2/3 innings pitched, giving him a lifetime ERA of 4.10.

His career highlights include a four-hit, no walk complete game shutout vs. the Oakland A's (July 3, 1979), an eight-strikeout, no walk complete game win (10–1) vs. the Baltimore Orioles (July 7, 1979), and a ten-inning, four-hit complete game win (2–1) vs. the Minnesota Twins (April 16, 1980).

== Later life ==
Frost threw the opening pitch at a Los Angeles Angels game on Monday, June 27, 2011.

Frost died on April 14, 2023, at Kindred Hospital in Westminster, California, from injuries sustained in a car accident. He was 70.

== See also ==
- Chicago White Sox all-time roster
