= Thad Bosley =

American baseball player (born 1956)

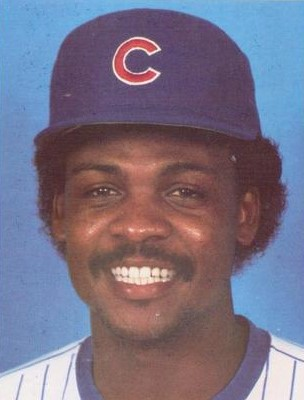
- Outfielder
- Born: September 17, 1956 (age 69); Oceanside, California, U.S.
- Batted: Left Threw: Left

MLB debut
- June 29, 1977, for the California Angels

Last MLB appearance
- May 30, 1990, for the Texas Rangers

MLB statistics
- Batting average: .272
- Home runs: 20
- Runs batted in: 158
- Stats at Baseball Reference

Teams
- As player: California Angels (1977); Chicago White Sox (1978–1980); Milwaukee Brewers (1981); Seattle Mariners (1982); Chicago Cubs (1983–1986); Kansas City Royals (1987–1988); California Angels (1988); Texas Rangers (1989–1990); As coach: Oakland Athletics (1999–2003); Texas Rangers (2011)

Thaddis Bosley Jr. (born September 17, 1956) is an American former professional baseball outfielder and coach.

== Playing career ==
Bosley was called up to the Angels after hitting .326 in 69 games for the Salt Lake City Gulls of the Pacific Coast League (PCL), and made his Major League debut on June 29, 1977. He was traded along with Bobby Bonds and Richard Dotson to the White Sox for Brian Downing, Chris Knapp and Dave Frost on December 5, 1977. He remained with the White Sox organization for three years and later played for the Milwaukee Brewers, Seattle Mariners, and Chicago Cubs, distinguishing himself as one of the best pinch hitters in the majors. During the 1985 season, Bosley hit .328 and was voted the best pinch hitter in baseball. After being traded to the Kansas City Royals in 1987, Bosley returned again to the California Angels in 1988. In 1989, he signed with the Texas Rangers and ended his playing career on June 1, 1990.

He appeared with two division champions, the 1981 Brewers and the 1984 Cubs. Both teams lost their respective League Championship Series, however, so Bosley never played in a World Series. Bosley played 14 major-league seasons, appearing in 784 games with 1,581 at-bats, a .272 batting average and 20 home runs.

== Coaching career ==
Bosley was a coach for the Oakland Athletics from 1999 to 2002. During the 2008 and 2009 seasons Bosley served as an assistant coach and then as the head coach for the baseball team at the now defunct Bethany University in Scotts Valley, California. Bosley was announced on June 24, 2009, as the head coach at Southwestern College in Phoenix, Arizona. After one season at Southwestern, Bosley accepted the hitting coach vacancy for the most recent American League champion, the Texas Rangers on November 23, 2010. The Rangers fired him on June 8, 2011.

== Personal life ==
Bosley was briefly a member of a funk group called Ballplayers which featured former MLB journeyman Lenny Randle. Some of their music can be heard on a compilation called "Family Album", which was released in 2010 on the D.C.-based music label, People's Potential Family.
