= Richard Dotson =

American baseball player (born 1959)

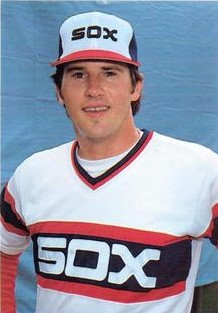
- Pitcher
- Born: January 10, 1959 (age 67); Cincinnati, Ohio, U.S.
- Batted: Right Threw: Right

MLB debut
- September 4, 1979, for the Chicago White Sox

Last MLB appearance
- June 5, 1990, for the Kansas City Royals

MLB statistics
- Win–loss record: 111–113
- Earned run average: 4.23
- Strikeouts: 973
- Stats at Baseball Reference

Teams
- Chicago White Sox (1979–1987); New York Yankees (1988–1989); Chicago White Sox (1989); Kansas City Royals (1990)

Career highlights and awards
- All-Star (1984)

Richard Elliott Dotson (born January 10, 1959) is an American former right-handed pitcher in Major League Baseball in the 1980s. He is best noted for his 22-7 performance of 1983, helping the Chicago White Sox win the American League West Division championship that season. Dotson finished fourth in the American League Cy Young Award voting; teammate LaMarr Hoyt took the award. Arm injuries came to limit what was a promising baseball career.

In a 12-season career, Rich Dotson recorded a record of 111–113 with a 4.23 ERA in 305 games, 295 of them starts. He pitched 55 complete games and 11 shutouts in his career. Dotson gave up 872 earned runs and struck out 973 in 1857 1/3 innings pitched.

== Playing career ==
Dotson was born in Cincinnati and drafted out of Anderson High School by the California Angels in the summer of 1977, but was traded along with Bobby Bonds and Thad Bosley to the White Sox for Brian Downing, Chris Knapp and Dave Frost on December 5, 1977.

His debut in the majors was inauspicious. White Sox manager Tony La Russa handed him the ball on September 4, 1979, as the starter for a game at Anaheim, but the 20-year-old Dotson retired only four Angels and left the park that day with an earned-run average of 33.75.

By the next season, Dotson was a 12-game winner in the Chicago rotation. In 1981, he led the American League in shutouts with four. But his breakout season definitely was 1983. Dotson's 22 wins were the second-most in the league, and included 14 complete games. He also led the American League with 106 walks and finished fourth in AL Cy Young Award voting. On the final day of the regular season, he and Dennis Lamp combined for a shutout at Seattle that put the White Sox in first place by a whopping 20 games over the nearest contender.

The closest Dotson ever came to pitching a no-hitter was in a 1–0 loss to the Baltimore Orioles at Memorial Stadium on May 18, 1983. The Orioles' lone hit and the only run of the game was Dan Ford's one-out opposite-field solo homer over the right-field fence in the eighth inning. He was also the losing pitcher in his only postseason appearance, an 11–1 defeat to the Orioles in Game 3 of the American League Championship Series at Comiskey Park five months later on October 7. Eddie Murray's one-out three-run homer into the right-field upper deck off Dotson in the first inning was the deciding blow.

Dotson became an All-Star the following summer, working two scoreless innings in the 1984 All-Star Game at Candlestick Park.

Although his career never again reached those heights, Dotson did go 12–9 in the New York Yankees' rotation in 1988. The team was in first place for much of the season's first half, including in late July, before fading. Dotson had a strong finish, combining with two relievers on September 29 for a seven-hitter at Baltimore in his final start of the season.

== Post-playing career ==
Dotson served as the pitching coach for the Charlotte Knights for nine seasons before becoming the pitching coordinator for their Major League affiliate, the Chicago White Sox.

== Personal life ==
Dotson learned in 2018 that his biological father was Turk Farrell, who played 14 MLB seasons.
