= John Caneira =

American baseball player (born 1952)

- Pitcher
- Born: October 7, 1952 (age 73); Waterbury, Connecticut, U.S.
- Batted: Right Threw: Right

MLB debut
- September 10, 1977, for the California Angels

Last MLB appearance
- July 22, 1978, for the California Angels

MLB statistics
- Win–loss record: 2–2
- Earned run average: 4.71
- Strikeouts: 17
- Stats at Baseball Reference

Teams
- California Angels (1977–1978)
Medals
Men's baseball
Representing United States
Pan American Games
Silver medal – second place	1971 Cali	Team

John Cascaes Caneira (born October 7, 1952) is an American former professional baseball player who played two seasons for the California Angels of Major League Baseball.

Born in Waterbury, Connecticut, Caneira went to Naugatuck High School in Naugatuck, Connecticut. He went 7–0 in his senior season, and was selected by the Pittsburgh Pirates in the 11th round of the 1970 MLB draft. He opted instead to attend Division III Eastern Connecticut State University in Willimantic, Connecticut. In college, he had an overall 105–20 record, and was a three-time NAIA All-American.

In 1972 and 1973, he played collegiate summer baseball in the Cape Cod Baseball League (CCBL) for the Bourne Canalmen (1972) and Chatham A's (1973). He was named an all-star both seasons, and won the league's Outstanding Pitcher award in both seasons.

Caneira was selected by the California Angels in the 1st round of the secondary phase of the 1974 MLB draft. He made his major league debut for the Angels in 1977, and appeared in 6 games for California that year.

Caneira was inducted into the Eastern Connecticut Athletic Hall of Fame in 1986, and was inducted into the Cape Cod Baseball League Hall of Fame in 2004.
