= Fred Kuhaulua =

American baseball player (1953–2021)

- Pitcher
- Born: February 23, 1953; Honolulu, Hawaii
- Died: September 20, 2021 (aged 68); Waianae, Hawaii, U.S.
- Batted: Left Threw: Left

Professional debut
- MLB: August 2, 1977, for the California Angels
- NPB: April 30, 1978, for the Chunichi Dragons

Last appearance
- NPB: September 24, 1978, for the Chunichi Dragons
- MLB: October 1, 1981, for the San Diego Padres

MLB statistics
- Win–loss record: 1–0
- Earned run average: 4.79
- Strikeouts: 19

NPB statistics
- Win–loss record: 3–4
- Earned run average: 4.33
- Strikeouts: 52
- Stats at Baseball Reference

Teams
- California Angels (1977); Chunichi Dragons (1978); San Diego Padres (1981)

Fred Mahele Kuhaulua (February 23, 1953 – September 20, 2021) was a Major League Baseball pitcher. On August 1, 1972, the left-hander was signed by the California Angels as an amateur free agent. He played for the Angels (1977) and the San Diego Padres (1981).

Kuhaulua made his major league debut in relief on August 2, 1977, against the New York Yankees at Anaheim Stadium. He pitched 2.1 innings and gave up five hits (including a Chris Chambliss home run) and three earned runs. Kuhaulua struck out Willie Randolph to end the 6th. He appeared in three games for the Angels that month and had an ERA of 15.63, earning himself a trip back to the Salt Lake City Gulls of the Pacific Coast League.

He was released by the Angels during spring training of 1978 and signed with the Chunichi Dragons of the Japanese Central League. After a season in Japan he was signed by the Padres on March 1, 1979.

He pitched in five games for San Diego in 1981, including four starts, and had an ERA of 2.45. His finest major league effort was in the last game of his career, on October 1, 1981, against Fernando Valenzuela and the Los Angeles Dodgers. Kuhaulua pitched the first eight innings of a 1-0 shutout that night at Dodger Stadium, and Eric Show saved it for him with a scoreless 9th.

Career totals for 8 games pitched include a 1–0 record, 5 games started, and 2 games finished. He allowed 19 earned runs in 35.2 innings pitched, giving him a lifetime ERA of 4.79.
