= 1995 U.S. Open Cup =

Tournament details
- Country: United States
- Teams: 16

Final positions
- Champions: Richmond Kickers (1st title)
- Runners-up: El Paso Patriots
- 1996 CONCACAF Cup Winners Cup: Richmond Kickers

The 1995 United States Open Cup is often considered the start of the modern era of the U.S. Open Cup due to the re-introduction of professional teams. It was the 82nd edition of the soccer tournament to crown the national champion of the United States.

The Richmond Kickers of the USISL Premier League won the cup in a 4–2 shootout against the El Paso Patriots, following a 1–1 tie after extra time. The match was played at Socorro ISD Stadium, El Paso, Texas.

== Bracket ==
First Round
USASA	Flamengo SC (UT)	2
APSL	Colorado Foxes	6
USASA	St. Petersburg Kickers	2
USISL	El Paso Patriots	5
APSL	Seattle Sounders	9
USISL	Everett Bigfoot	2
USISL	Valley Golden Eagles	0
USISL	Chico Rooks	2
USISL	Richmond Kickers	6
USASA	Fairfax Spartans	2
USISL	Tampa Bay Cyclones	2
APSL	Atlanta Ruckus	4
USASA	AAC Eagles (IL)	1
USISL	Chicago Stingers	2
USISL	Connecticut Wolves	0
APSL	New York Centaurs	3

Quarterfinals
APSL	Colorado Foxes	0
USISL	El Paso Patriots	2
APSL	Seattle Sounders	5
USISL	Chico Rooks	0
USISL	Richmond Kickers	2
APSL	Atlanta Ruckus	1
USISL	Chicago Stingers	1
APSL	New York Centaurs	0

Semifinals
USISL	El Paso Patriots	1
APSL	Seattle Sounders	0
USISL	Richmond Kickers	4
USISL	Chicago Stingers	3

Final
USISL	El Paso Patriots	1 (2)
USISL	Richmond Kickers (AET, PSO)	1 (4)

== Rounds ==
=== First round ===
June 11	Richmond Kickers (USISL Premier League)	5–2	Maryland Spartans (USASA)	Richmond, Virginia
	Crawley 4'; Stockton 13', 21'; Snyder 46'; Ukrop 60'	Report	Troncoso 66'; Maxwell 71'	Stadium: University of Richmond Stadium; Attendance: 200
Note: match was protested by Maryland Spartans and upheld so replay was done on July 2

June 14	New York Centaurs (A-League)	3–0	Connecticut Wolves (USISL Pro)	New York City, New York
6:30 PM EST	Gjonbalaj 22'; Llamosa 25'; Carrera 51'	Report		Stadium: Downing Stadium; Attendance: 200

June 14	Atlanta Ruckus (A-League)	4–2	Tampa Bay Cyclones (USISL Pro)	Atlanta, Georgia
	Moore 28', 53'; Steenkamp 61'; Murray 90+'	Report	Bush 82'; Yepes 90'	Stadium: Adams Stadium; Attendance: 810

June 14	Seattle Sounders (A-League)	9–2	Everett BigFoot (USISL Pro)	Kirkland, Washington
7:30 PM PT	Farrell 12'; Medved 26', 33', 41'; Jas. Dunn 37'; Jam. Dunn 54'; Hattrup 58'; Storkson 60'; Fry 69'	Report	Machado 85', 89'	Stadium: Lake Washington High School; Attendance: 500

June 14	Flamengo SC (USASA)	1–6	Colorado Foxes (A-League)	Provo, Utah
7:30 PM MDT	Jensen	Report	Hooker 10', 44'; Siersbaek 45'; Eck 46' (pen.); Haynes	Stadium: Haws Field; Attendance: 800

June 18	Chico Rooks (USISL Pro)	2–0	San Fernando Valley Golden Eagles (USISL Pro)	Durham, California
2:00 PM PT	Welker 23', 31'	Report		Stadium: Durham High School

June 18	Chicago Stingers (USISL Pro)	2–1 (a.e.t.)	AAC Eagles (USASA)	Arlington Heights, Illinois
6:00 PM CT	Gregoire Jr. 62'; Morris 99'	Report	Gurgul 64'	Stadium: Forest View Park

June 25	El Paso Patriots (USISL Pro)	5–2	St. Petersburg McCormick Kickers (USASA)	El Paso, Texas
	Passantino 35'; Stewart 45'; Gomez 50'; Delgado 89'	Report	Bowden 9'; Ward 10'	Stadium: Dudley Field; Attendance: 1,000

July 2 Replay	Richmond Kickers (USISL Premier League)	6–1	Maryland Spartans (USASA)	Glen Allen, Virginia
	Ukrop 37'; Williams 40'; Cowlishaw 56'; Kamler 58'; Hall 68'; Turnage 86'	Report	Suazo 15'	Stadium: Striker Park

=== Quarterfinals ===
July 12	Chicago Stingers (USISL Pro)	1–0	New York Centaurs (A-League)	Arlington Heights, Illinois
	Linn 89'			Stadium: Forest View Park

July 12	Colorado Foxes (A-League)	0–2	El Paso Patriots (USISL Pro)	Colorado Springs, Colorado
			Mercado	Stadium: Four Diamond Sports Complex

July 12	Richmond Kickers (USISL Premier League)	2–1	Atlanta Ruckus (A-League)	Richmond, Virginia
	Ukrop; Snyder 56'	Report	Doyle 51'	Stadium: University of Richmond Stadium; Attendance: 2,083

July 21	Seattle Sounders (A-League)	5–0	Chico Rooks (USISL Pro)	Kirkland, Washington
	Fry 1'; Webber 39'; Storkson 53', 85'; Medved 73'	Report		Stadium: Juanita High School; Attendance: 717

=== Semifinals ===
July 30	El Paso Patriots (USISL Pro)	1–0	Seattle Sounders (A-League)	El Paso, Texas
	Amparan	Report		Stadium: Dudley Field; Attendance: 2,000

August 4	Richmond Kickers (USISL Premier League)	4–3	Chicago Stingers (USISL Pro)	Richmond, Virginia
	Kamler 1'; Hall; Snyder 69'; Crawley 89' (pen.)	Report	Morris; D'Ambra 88'	Stadium: University of Richmond Stadium; Attendance: 4,667

=== Final ===
August 27, 1995

Richmond Kickers (USISL Premier)	1–1	El Paso Patriots (USISL Pro)
Ukrop (Cowlishaw) 49'	Report	Gabino Amparán (Mercado) 82'
Penalties
	4 – 2

Soccorro Ind. School District Stadium, El Paso, Texas
Attendance: 7,378

MVP: Rob Ukrop (Richmond)

== See also ==
1995 National Amateur Cup
