= El Paso Diablos =

- El Paso, Texas

Minor league affiliations
- Previous classes: Independent (2005–2013); Class AA (1962–1970, 1972–2004); Class D (1961); Class B (1955–1957); Class C (1947–1954); Class B (1946); Class C (1940–1941); Class D (1915, 1930–1932, 1937–1941)
- Previous leagues: American Association (2006–2013); Central Baseball League (2005); Texas League (1962–1970, 1972–2004); Sophomore League (1961); Southwestern League (1956–1957); West Texas–New Mexico League (1955); Arizona–Texas League (1952–1954); Southwest International League (1951); Arizona–Texas League (1947–1950); Mexican National League (1946); Arizona–Texas League (1931–1932, 1937–1941); Arizona State League (1930); Rio Grande Association (1915)

Major league affiliations
- Previous teams: Arizona Diamondbacks (1999–2004); Milwaukee Brewers (1981–1998); California Angels (1973–1980); Los Angeles Dodgers (1972); California Angels (1965–1970); San Francisco Giants (1961–1964); Boston Red Sox (1948); Cleveland Indians (1940); New York Yankees (1937, 1939)

Minor league titles
- League titles: 12 (1931, 1937, 1940, 1949, 1950, 1956, 1962, 1968, 1972, 1978, 1986, 1994)
- Division titles: 12 (1968, 1972, 1974, 1977, 1978, 1982, 1985, 1986, 1993, 1994)
- First-half titles: 9 (1977, 1978, 1982, 1985, 1986, 1988, 1991, 1993, 1994)
- Second-half titles: 12 (1977, 1978, 1983, 1985, 1986, 1987, 1988, 1992, 1993, 1994, 1996, 2000)

Team data
- Name: El Paso Diablos (1974–2013); El Paso Sun Kings (1973); El Paso Sun Dodgers (1972); El Paso Sun Kings (1961–1970); El Paso Texans (1930–1932, 1937–1941, 1946–1957); El Paso Mackmen (1915); El Paso Browns (1892–1914)
- Colors: Black, red, white
- Mascot: Kasey the Chicken (1990-2013); Scoops the Tiger (2002-2013); Chilli D. (1999-2004)
- Ballpark: Cohen Stadium
- Previous parks: Dudley Field
- Owner/ Operator: Tigua Native American Tribe
- General manager: Matt LaBranche
- Manager: Tim Johnson
- Media: KHEY 1380 AM

"El Paso Diablos" refers to two different professional baseball teams based in El Paso, Texas, in the United States. The most recent Diablos were a member of the South Division of the American Association of Independent Professional Baseball, which is an affiliate league of Major League Baseball since 2020. From 1990 to 2013, the Diablos, in both incarnations, played their home games at Cohen Stadium. The team's name means "devils" in the Spanish language.

== Team history ==
=== A Maverick Beginning ===
The team has its roots going back to 1892, when the team was originally called the El Paso Browns. The name eventually changed to the Mavericks. In 1913, the El Paso Mavericks played in the Copper League, which consisted of teams from Silver City, Hurley, and Santa Rita, New Mexico. Despite coming in third place that season, the Mavericks went on to win the post season tournament, becoming the Southwestern Champions of 1913. In 1915, the Mavericks joined the Rio Grande Association, a Class D minor league. Though the league folded after a year, the Mavericks continued to play in some form or another.

In 1924, the longtime home for the team, Dudley Field (known, locally as the "Dudley Dome") named for El Paso Mayor R.M. "Dick" Dudley, was constructed in South El Paso. While technically not a Dome in any sense of the word, the stadium had a supernatural ability to avoid rain showers and the unique ability to keep the temperature inside the stadium the same as that outside of the stadium. Another unique feature of the park was that the structure under the main grandstand was constructed out of adobe. A final feature, one that would be used by the Brewers to test their pitchers in the future was that it was notoriously hitter friendly. Due to its cozy dimensions (340-395-340), pitchers had to work hard to make sure their ERAs would at least be below five.

In 1922, Syd and Andy Cohen played for the Mavericks and later played in the Major Leagues. Andy Cohen was a second baseman for the New York Giants, and Syd was a pitcher for several different teams in the American League, though he would be the last pitcher to strike out Babe Ruth. Syd also pitched in the Mexican leagues and later managed the Juarez team.

=== From Mavericks to Texans ===
In 1930, the team, now known as the El Paso Texans, was admitted to the Arizona State League in 1930 to replace the defunct Mesa Jewels. The Arizona State League included teams from Phoenix, Tucson, and Douglas. El Paso was the only Texas team in the league and missed winning the pennant by only half a game, losing to the Bisbee Bees.

The Texans remained in this league for decades. In 1931, the Arizona State League became the Arizona–Texas League, which ran from 1931–32 and revived in 1937–1941. In 1940, the League was made into a Class C league. The league halted play from 1942 to 1946 because of World War II, though the Texans did play in the Mexican National League for one year, in 1946. The Arizona–Texas League play resumed in 1947, until 1950, when the league merged with the Sunset League to form the Southwest International League. This league only lasted for a year before reverting into the Arizona–Texas League.

In 1950, owner Jack Corbett sold the team in August to Dick Saunders and Tom Love, two young El Paso building contractors. Saunders and Love hired John Phelan to be the general manager. The Texans finished in second only to their rivals, the Juarez Indios, at the end of the season.

In 1951, the New York Yankees (featuring a young rookie named Mickey Mantle) came to El Paso to play an exhibition game against the Texans, winning 16–10. In 1954, the team was sold to Dick Azar, the El Paso Coors distributor who brought beer to the ballpark for the first time. Beer was sold during the game and was given to the players in their dressing room free of charge after the games.

After losing money for two seasons, Azar sold the team to Pat McLaughlin in 1956. The team won the Southwestern League pennant that season, but only 51,386 fans came to see the Texans play all season. Due to money problems, McLaughlin handed the team in 1957 to Tom McHugh, S.E. Adams and Jimmy Hamilton. At the end of the season, the Southwestern League dropped the El Paso Texans.

=== The dawn of the Sun Kings ===
Professional baseball was not played in El Paso again until 1961 when a group of 40 people, known as the Sports Development Committee of the El Paso Chamber of Commerce, took it upon themselves to revive it. John Phelan, the Texans former manager, was named vice president and general manager. Each of the 40 people put up to $500 to help finance the team. Phelan and the committee managed to get the organization into the Class D Sophomore League and renamed the team the El Paso Sun Kings. The Sun Kings had a terrific season, finishing in third, and, for the first time, turned a profit.

In 1962, the Sun Kings joined the Class AA Texas League. The organization's rookie season was a huge success, as they won the Texas League championship. In 1963, the team hit 207 home runs, setting a new league record for most home runs in a season.

From 1961 to 1964, the El Paso Ball club had been affiliated with the San Francisco Giants, their most notable player coming through the system at the time being Jesús Alou of the famous baseball family. In 1965, the Sun Kings became a farm team for the California Angels. The Sports Development Committee sold the team to Angels owner Gene Autry for $1, fulfilling their mission of bringing professional baseball back to El Paso. John Stanfill replaced John Phelan as general manager in 1967, and the team came in second to Albuquerque, which won the Texas League pennant that season. In the sixties several future major leaguers got their start in El Paso including José Cardenal and Randy Hundley. The most publicized of the young players was Dick Dietz who it was told got a $500,000 signing bonus. During the Sun Kings' tenure as an Angel Affiliate, one of their most famous prospects passed through their system: a young second base prospect by the name of Kurt Russell. Russell led the league in hitting with a .563 batting average. However, during a play, he was hit in the shoulder by another player running to second base, the collision resulting in a torn rotator cuff in his shoulder. The injury forced his retirement from baseball in 1973, and he returned to acting. Russell recently told Sports Illustrated that before his injury, he was going to be called up. During this era players collected dollar bills from the chicken wire fence between the stands and the field for outstanding play.

The partnership with the Angels lasted until 1970. The city was without a team for one year until 1972 when the Los Angeles Dodgers brought in their AA affiliate and the team's name was changed to Sun Dodgers for the season. The partnership with the Angels resumed and the name reverted to Sun Kings in 1973.

=== Diablos and other Minor League revolutionaries ===
In 1974, Jim Paul bought the team for $1000 and assumed the team's $52,000 in outstanding debt, and proceeded to revolutionize baseball, not only in El Paso but throughout the Minor Leagues and even influence the Majors. Paul's purchase of the team ushered in the golden age of El Paso baseball. The name of the team was changed to the Diablos, the Spanish word for "devils". Paul held numerous innovative promotions and promoted a lively, fan-friendly atmosphere at the ballpark. Sparing any expense, save a coat of bright yellow paint with the word "BASEBALL" written in twelve foot tall red letters, Dudley Field was converted to "The Dudley Dome." While technically not a dome in any sense of the word, the field had a supernatural ability to avoid rain-outs and the unique ability to keep the temperature inside the stadium the same as that outside of the stadium. The home team dugout had the word "Diablos" painted on top while the visitors dugout received a coat of paint that said "Enemy." Upon entering the turnstiles fans were given a facial tissue to use for "Bye, Bye, Baby" when the visiting team changed pitchers the outgoing pitcher was serenaded by the Janis Joplin tune over the PA system while the fans in the grandstand waved their tissues. One notable victim was Dennis Eckersley who acknowledged the crowd by tipping his hat, though others were not so considerate and the Texas League created a standard fine for those obscene gestures. Other promotions included 10¢ hotdog night, nickel beer night, and Martinez Appreciation Night where anyone with the last name Martinez received free admission.

Paul's innovative marketing techniques showed outstanding results. In 1975 despite finishing 18 ½ games out of first place the Diablos drew 162,395 fans, more than every other Class AA team and 16 of the 24 Triple-A teams. Paul was named Sporting News' Class Double A Executive of the Year in 1974 and 1975. in 1976 the Diablos came in third and attendance increased to 181,747, outdrawing all but 6 teams in the minor leagues, and were awarded the MacPhail Trophy, which is given to the outstanding organization in all minor league baseball. In 1977 the Diablos finished in first place and drew 217,345 fans which outpaced all but 4 Triple-A teams and Paul was once again recognized as Sporting News' Class Double A Executive of the Year for a third time.

In 1978 the Diablos completed a 9-game winning streak to back-door the Texas League Western Division Championship and then swept the Jackson Mets in a best of 5 series to claim the Texas League banner. During that 12-game winning streak, the San Diego Chicken made his debut outside the San Diego area and his minor league debut by performing in the final regular game of the season before a more than sold out stadium. It was the catalyst to launch his career during his hiatus from San Diego due to court injunctions that prevented him from performing for the Padres.

In 1980, the Diablos began airing all of their baseball games on radio station KHEY (AM) AM-690 and simulcast select homegames on Paragon Cable, with current UTEP football announcer Jon Teicher as its first play-by-play announcer. Other notable Diablos announcers include current play-by-play announcer for the Oakland A's Vince Cotroneo (1985–1987), and Matt Vasgersian (1993–1995) who currently provides play-by-play for Fox Sports' Major League Baseball coverage and is a studio host for MLB Network.

In 1981, the Diablos became an affiliate of the Milwaukee Brewers, a relationship which lasted until 1999. Tony Muser was the manager for the first two seasons.

Also in 1981, Texaco sponsored the installation of a $70,000 electronic scoreboard at Dudley Field, previously the scoreboard had been hand operated. The Diablos won the Texas League Pennant in 1986. In 1988, the Diablos also had a young prospect named Gary Sheffield.

However, as the decade continued, the old Dudley Dome was showing its age. It became apparent that the team would need a new facility, as the city was expanding and the Dudley Dome was becoming increasingly difficult to maintain. Construction began in the growing Northeast area of El Paso on a new facility. With the stadium not completed in time for the start of the 1990 season the Diablos continued to play at Dudley Dome. On June 13, 1990 the Diablos said farewell to the Dudley Dome, their home of 65 years, and greeted their new ballpark, Cohen Stadium, named after the Cohen brothers Syd Cohen and Andy Cohen, who had returned to El Paso to work for the club. The Dudley Dome continued to have tenants however, hosting the El Paso Patriots Soccer Club, and the final tenant the El Paso Scorpions Rugby Club. Dudley Field was finally demolished on November 5, 2005 to make room for the new African wing of the El Paso Zoo.

In 1990, Cohen Stadium opened to the public, becoming an immediate success for the team. That same year, it became the only minor league ballpark to grace the cover of National Geographic. In 1993 The Diablos became the first Double A team to ever draw 300,000 fans. The Diablos won the Texas League pennant again in 1994 and remained competitive for several years after.

In 1999, the Diablos ended their relationship with Brewers, and soon agreed to become the Double A affiliate for the Arizona Diamondbacks. Paul had sold the team to Diamond Sports in 1996, who in turn sold the team in 2004 to Brett Sports and Entertainment, a sports conglomerate headed by former major leaguer George Brett.

=== The death of the El Paso Diablos? ===
This change instead signalled the beginning of the end of Minor League baseball in El Paso. The Diablos ceased many of the promotions that made the team successful earlier, and the lack of strong players (save for the brief time that Brad Penny spent in the organization) in the Arizona system rendered the team weak and unsuccessful. With the exception of making the playoffs in 2000, the team was largely dismal and the atmosphere around the park had largely changed from the lighthearted atmosphere that had existed during the Jim Paul era.

One other factor that affected attendance was the constant rumors that the team would be moved, rumors that Brett Sports and Entertainment would refuse to admit or deny. With every stadium construction that seemed to take place around the country, the Diablos would always be linked as a possible tenant. Furthermore, Brett Sports and Entertainment demanded the city of El Paso make millions in renovations to Cohen Stadium, which the city refused when there was no indication that the team would be staying. There was a brief spike in attendance on July 11, 2003 when Randy Johnson made a rehab start, but attendance remained low and the team began to hemorrhage money.

In 2004, with the Diablos’ contract with the Diamondbacks soon to expire, ownership made no move to re-sign with the Diamondbacks. While there was speculation of the team possibly changing teams, Diablo fans' worst fears were realized when it was announced that the team had been sold to the St. Louis Cardinals for an estimated $9.8 million. Public backlash resulted; Brett Sports and Entertainment attempted to search for a team to replace the departing Diablos, but in the end, the Diablos moved to Springfield, Missouri to become the Springfield Cardinals (for more information on the original team's history at this point, see the corresponding article).

=== The rebirth of the El Paso Diablos ===
However, the move of the team signalled a new beginning of the Diablos. In 2005, it was announced that the independent Central Baseball League had granted a franchise to Mark Schuster, who brought back the Diablos to begin play that same year. Former Los Angeles Dodgers first-baseman/right fielder Mike Marshall was selected to manage the team. The front office returned to the management style that had been in use during the Jim Paul era, bringing back many fans that had become disenchanted with the team in recent years.

The team's debut on May 6, 2005, set a league attendance record of 10,116. Though the team finished in last during the first half of the season, the Diablos came alive in the second half, finishing in third and just missing the playoffs. The team set an attendance record for the league, finishing with an attendance of 190,429. The team also had several other special moments throughout the year. On Friday, July 8, 2005, former major leaguer and El Paso native Rocky Coppinger took the mound for a start. On July 27, the Florida Marlins purchased the contract of RHP Andy Torres from the Diablos.

Following the end of the season, the Diablos announced that they would join with several fellow Central League members including the Coastal Bend Aviators, the Fort Worth Cats, the Pensacola Pelicans, and the Shreveport Sports and join with former Northern League teams the Saint Paul Saints, Sioux City Explorers, the Sioux Falls Pheasants, and the Lincoln Saltdogs to form the American Association of Independent Professional Baseball as an independent minor league. The league began play in 2006 with a 96-game schedule along with an expansion team in St. Joseph, Missouri known as the Blacksnakes. The league's first All-Star game was in El Paso, Texas and played against the Can-Am League in July 2006.

With the second season beginning in May 2006, the Diablos had an air of hope around them and were expected to contend in their new league. However, the team had vastly changed from the year before thanks to the purchase of closer Derrick DePriest by the Kansas City Royals on February 13, 2006. Also, upon Marshalls request, several members of the San Angelo Colts were signed, giving the Diablos possibly the most powerful offensive unit in the league, but the pitching staff that had been so mediocre the year before was unchanged. The team stumbled badly at the start of the season. The offense was dormant through much of the time, a factor that was worsened when offensive star Juan Camacho was bought by the Chicago White Sox on May 29. With the team floundering, on June 16, 2006, Marshall was released and replaced in the coming days by former major league pitcher Butch Henry, a graduate of El Paso's Eastwood High School. Though Henry provided some improvement, the team was still terrible and continued to struggle. The Diablos would lose shortstop Albenis Machado on August 13 when he was sold to the Chicago Cubs and eight days later would be on the receiving end of a no-hitter by Fort Worth Cats pitcher Joel Kirsten. The Diablos would ultimately finish last in the Southern Division.

With new manager Butch Henry on board the Diablos were expected to be a much better team for the 2007 season, and they did finish the first half of the season in first place in the Southern Division with 28 wins and 23 losses and 4 games ahead of second place Shreveport and automatically getting a spot for the league play-offs – their first play-off appearance since the 2000 season when they were in the AA Texas League. On the 4th of July, the Diablos set the league attendance single-game record with more than 11,000 fans attending a game.

=== The end, again ===
After a disappointing 2011 baseball season, Schuster sold the Diablos to the Tigua Tribe, a Native American tribe in June 2011.

The Diablos were replaced by the El Paso Chihuahuas of the Triple-A Pacific Coast League for the 2014 baseball season. This coincided with the opening of a new baseball stadium in downtown El Paso, which replaced Cohen Stadium as the home of professional baseball in El Paso.

The Diablos relocated to Joe Becker Stadium in Joplin, Missouri, as the Joplin Blasters beginning with the 2015 season.

=== Notable Diablo alumni ===
- Willie Aikens
- Jesús Alou
- Jim Anderson
- John Balaz
- Ralph Botting
- Tom Brunansky
- Tom Candiotti
- Mark Clear
- Andy Cohen
- Syd Cohen
- Tim Crews
- Paul Dade
- Narciso Elvira
- Bob Ferris
- Danny Goodwin
- Brian Harper
- Teddy Higuera
- Conor Jackson
- John Jaha
- Randy Johnson
- Byung-hyun Kim
- Fred Kuhaulua
- Ken Landreaux
- Carney Lansford
- Cory Lidle
- Lyle Overbay
- Brad Penny
- Carlos Quentin
- Floyd Rayford
- Kurt Russell
- Ken Schrom
- Daryl Sconiers
- Gary Sheffield
- Chris Snyder
- Chad Tracy
- Dan Uggla
- Brandon Webb
- Mike Witt
