= Carlos Kaiser (footballer) =

Brazilian con artist (born 1963)

Personal information
- Full name: Carlos Henrique Raposo
- Date of birth: 2 April 1963 (age 63)
- Place of birth: Porto Alegre, Rio Grande do Sul, Brazil
- Height: 1.84 m (6 ft 1/2 in)
- Position: Striker

Youth career
- 1972–1973: Botafogo
- 1973–1979: Flamengo

Senior career*
Years	Team	Apps	(Gls)
1979	Puebla	0	(0)
1979–1981	Rangitoto NZ	0	(0)
1981–1983	Flamengo	0	(0)
1983–1985	Independiente	0	(0)
1985–1986	Bangu	0	(0)
1987–1988	Flamengo	0	(0)
1988	Bangu	0	(0)
1988–1989	Fluminense	0	(0)
1989	Vasco da Gama	0	(0)
1989–1990	El Paso Sixshooters	0	(0)
1990–1991	América (RJ)	0	(0)
1991–1992	Botafogo	0	(0)
Total		0	(0)
- * Club domestic league appearances and goals

Carlos Henrique Raposo (born 2 April 1963), commonly known as Carlos Kaiser, is a Brazilian con artist and former footballer. Although his abilities were far short of professional standard, he managed to sign for numerous football teams during his decade-long career. He never played a regular game, the closest occurrence ending in a red card whilst warming up, and hid his limited ability with injuries, frequent team changes, and other ruses.

== Career ==
=== Early career ===
Nicknamed "Kaiser" due to a purported resemblance to Franz Beckenbauer when he was young (although his friend Luiz Maerovitch claims that the nickname stems from a resemblance to a bottle of Kaiser beer), Carlos Raposo began his youth career at Botafogo, then moved to Flamengo. In 1979, he impressed the scouts of Puebla during a training session and was signed by the Mexican club, although he was released months after without playing a single match.

=== Footballer ===
He later returned to Brazil and began a career as a farce footballer since he "wanted to be a footballer, but did not want to play football", becoming a friend of many footballers such as Carlos Alberto Torres, Ricardo Rocha and Renato Gaúcho so that he would have a big network to be recommended whenever he needed to transfer to a new club. With a physical shape similar to professional footballers, but lacking skills, his fraud consisted of signing a short contract and stating that he was lacking match fitness so that he would spend the first weeks only with physical training where he could shine. When he had to train with other players, he would feign a hamstring injury; the technology at the time made it difficult to detect the fraud. He had a dentist who claimed he had focal infection whenever any club wanted to go further. By following these steps, he managed to stay a few months at the various clubs just training and without ever being exposed as a fraud.

Another tactic was to befriend journalists so that they would write fictional stories about him. In one newspaper article, it was reported that he had such a great time at Puebla that he was even invited to become a Mexican citizen to play for the national team. He also used toy mobile phones, expensive and uncommon at the time, to create fake conversations in foreign languages or reject non-existent transfer offers to create an image of himself as a valuable player.

=== Club career ===
Upon returning to Brazil, Kaiser went back to Botafogo, starting his farce career. While employing his fake injury scam, he also made use of his aforementioned toy mobile phone scam by pretending to speak English to buy himself more time at the club, but was later discovered by a club doctor who was fluent in English. He later rejoined Flamengo and stayed a few months with the same injury scam.

Amongst his scams, he claimed that he played in Argentina at Talleres de Córdoba and Independiente, being brought by a man named "Alejandro", who was a friend of Jorge Burruchaga and claiming that he was part of the squad that won both the 1984 Copa Libertadores and the 1984 Intercontinental Cup by portraying himself as Carlos Enrique, an Argentinian player who was genuinely part of the squad.

In 1986, he allegedly moved to Europe and joined French Division 2 club Gazélec Ajaccio where a friend was playing. At his presentation, the club arranged a training session with the fans and, afraid of being caught, he shot all the balls to the crowd while kissing the club's badge. He never played at the club and returned to Brazil the following year, although his friendship with journalists later earned him an article where he was depicted as a top goalscorer at Gazélec Ajaccio where he had played for eight seasons. However, the friend, Fabio "Fabinho" Barros who played at Ajaccio for four years, says that Kaiser never actually went to Corsica. Instead, the two of them took photographs of Kaiser wearing an Ajaccio jersey that Barros gave to him as a present at a field in Horto. Barros states that Kaiser later used these photographs, as well as a forged player identification card as "proof" of his time in France.

Returning to Brazil, he joined Bangu, where he again used his fake injury scam. However, Castor de Andrade, the club's major sponsor and patron, became tired of seeing him just training. During one match, Castor told the coach to play him, as the team was losing 2–0. When Kaiser was sent to warm up, he saw a group of supporters shouting abuse at the players and started to fight them, for which he immediately received a red card without even participating in the actual match. After the match, he lied to the patron that the supporters called him a thief. He was forgiven and earned a six-month extension.

In 1989, Kaiser turned up on the roster of American indoor side: the El Paso Sixshooters of the Southwest Independent Soccer League.

Kaiser also had a spell at Fluminense where, together with his injury scam, he again used a toy mobile phone to pretend to reject offers from other clubs, stating that he was happy at the club, but was caught by an assistant. He later joined Vasco da Gama, where he was signed to help a teammate to overcome an alcohol problem as he did not drink and had a reputation of being a good person.

== Film ==
In November 2015, Kaiser signed an exclusive agreement with a UK production company, Nods & Volleys Entertainment Limited, which was specifically incorporated to tell his story on all media formats. Interview filming on a cinematic release was completed in December 2016.

Kaiser: The Greatest Footballer Never to Play Football had its world premiere at Tribeca Film Festival on 21 April 2018. The film features contributions from Carlos Alberto Torres, Zico, Renato Gaucho, Bebeto, Junior and Ricardo Rocha.

== Book ==
The book Kaiser: The Greatest Footballer Never to Play Football, by the journalist Rob Smyth, was published in 2018.
