= Dudley Field (El Paso) =

Former baseball stadium in El Paso, Texas

- Dudley Dome
- Location within Texas Dudley Field (the United States)
- Interactive map of Dudley Field
- Location: El Paso, Texas
- Coordinates: 31.7689537°N 106.4451757°W
- Capacity: 7,000
- Field size: Left field: 340 ft (100 m); Center field: 395 ft (120 m); Right field: 340 ft (100 m)

Construction
- Opened: 1924
- Demolished: November 5, 2005

Tenants
- El Paso Texans (ATL, MNL, SIL, WTNML, SWL) 1930–1932, 1937–1941, 1946–1957; El Paso Sun Kings (SL, TL) 1961–1970, 1973; El Paso Dodgers (TL) 1972; El Paso Diablos (TL) 1974–1989; El Paso Patriots (PDL) 2004

Dudley Field was a baseball park in El Paso, Texas from 1924 to 2005. The field was named after Mayor R. M. Dudley (1862–1925), and originally hosted the El Paso Texans team. Later the stadium played home to the El Paso Sun Kings, which later became the El Paso Diablos. The Diablos called Dudley home until 1989, when they relocated to a new facility, Cohen Stadium, in the northeast of town. Though an open stadium, it was long jokingly referred to as the "Dudley Dome" by the stadium announcers. Dudley Field had bleachers running down each foul line to complement the covered grandstand, which was made of adobe bricks, and sat behind home plate. It was located on the south side of the city directly next to the El Paso Zoo. Dudley was the first home of the El Paso Patriots soccer team, who played there for one season before moving to their own stadium. Mickey Mantle and other prominent stars of the era played in Dudley in the 1950s as a member of the New York Yankees. Many had hoped to find a new use for the old facility, but none was forthcoming. Demolition was completed on November 5, 2005. The land was given to the El Paso Zoo for further expansion.
