= Fabio Barros =

Brazilian footballer (born 1965)

Personal information
- Full name: Fabio Antonio Seixas Barros
- Date of birth: 11 April 1965 (age 61)
- Place of birth: Amazonas, Brazil
- Height: 1.65 m (5 ft 5 in)
- Position: Forward

Senior career*
Years	Team	Apps	(Gls)
1986–1990	Gazélec Ajaccio	84	(11)
- * Club domestic league appearances and goals

Fabio Antonio Seixas Barros (born 11 April 1965) is a Brazilian former footballer who played as a forward.

== Club career ==
Fabio Barros played for Gazélec Ajaccio between 1986 and 1990, amassing a total of eleven goals from eighty-four league appearances. While in Corsica, he introduced locals to beach soccer.

== Personal life ==
Barros was friends with Carlos Kaiser, the Brazilian conman who became famous for having a football career without ever playing a game. When Barros returned to Brazil on holiday, Kaiser made copies of his Gazélec Ajaccio registration card, and the two took photos with Kaiser wearing a Gazélec Ajaccio jersey in a field in Horto, to make it seem as if he was also a player of the Corsican club.

== Career statistics ==
=== Club ===
Appearances and goals by club, season and competition
Club	Season	League			Cup		Other		Total	
Club	Season	Division	Apps	Goals	Apps	Goals	Apps	Goals	Apps	Goals
Gazélec Ajaccio	1986–87	Division 2	13	4	1 (Note: Appearances in the Coupe de France)	0	0	0	14	4
Gazélec Ajaccio	1987–88	Division 2	28	3	1	0	0	0	29	3
Gazélec Ajaccio	1988–89	CFA	20	1	0	0	0	0	20	1
Gazélec Ajaccio	1989–90	CFA	23	2	2	0	0	0	25	2
Career total			84	11	4	0	0	0	88	11
