= Arena Independência =

Football stadium in Belo Hornzonte, Brazil

Estádio Raimundo Sampaio
- Arena Independência
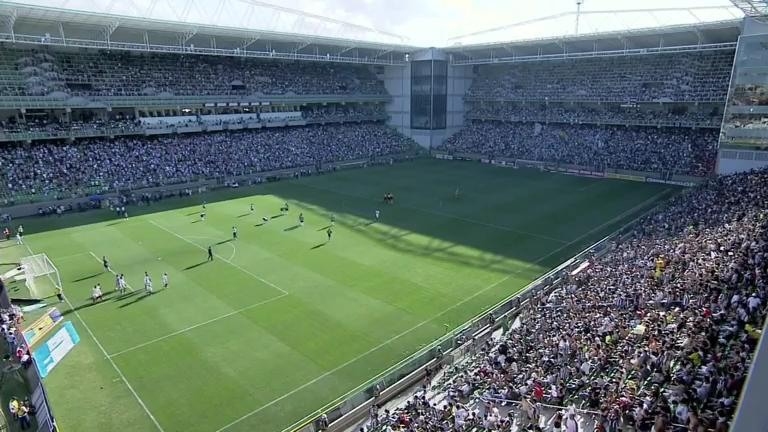
- Sisbrace
- Interactive map of Estádio Raimundo Sampaio
- Location: Belo Horizonte, Minas Gerais, Brazil
- Coordinates: 19°54′30″S 43°55′04″W
- Owner: América-MG
- Operator: BWA Arenas
- Capacity: 23,018
- Surface: Grass
- Field size: 105 × 68 meters

Construction
- Built: 1947–1950
- Opened: 25 June 1950
- Renovated: 2010–2012

Tenant
- América-MG

Estádio Raimundo Sampaio, more commonly known as Arena Independência (Independence Arena), is an association football stadium located in the Horto neighborhood of Belo Horizonte, Minas Gerais, Brazil. It was built in 1950 for the FIFA World Cup, held in Brazil. Initially its capacity was 30,000 people, but after the reconstruction between 2010 and 2012, the capacity is approximately 23,000 people. It belonged to the defunct Sete de Setembro Futebol Clube, which is why the stadium is called "Independence" (the name of the team, September 7, is Brazil's Independence Day). The stadium is currently property of América Futebol Clube, but has been leased to the Minas Gerais state government for 20 years as a counterpart to the injection of public resources to demolish the old stadium and build the new one.

Arena Independência is one of the most important stadiums in Belo Horizonte. Its formal name honors Raimundo Sampaio, a former chairman of Sete de Setembro. América plays their home games here.

== History ==
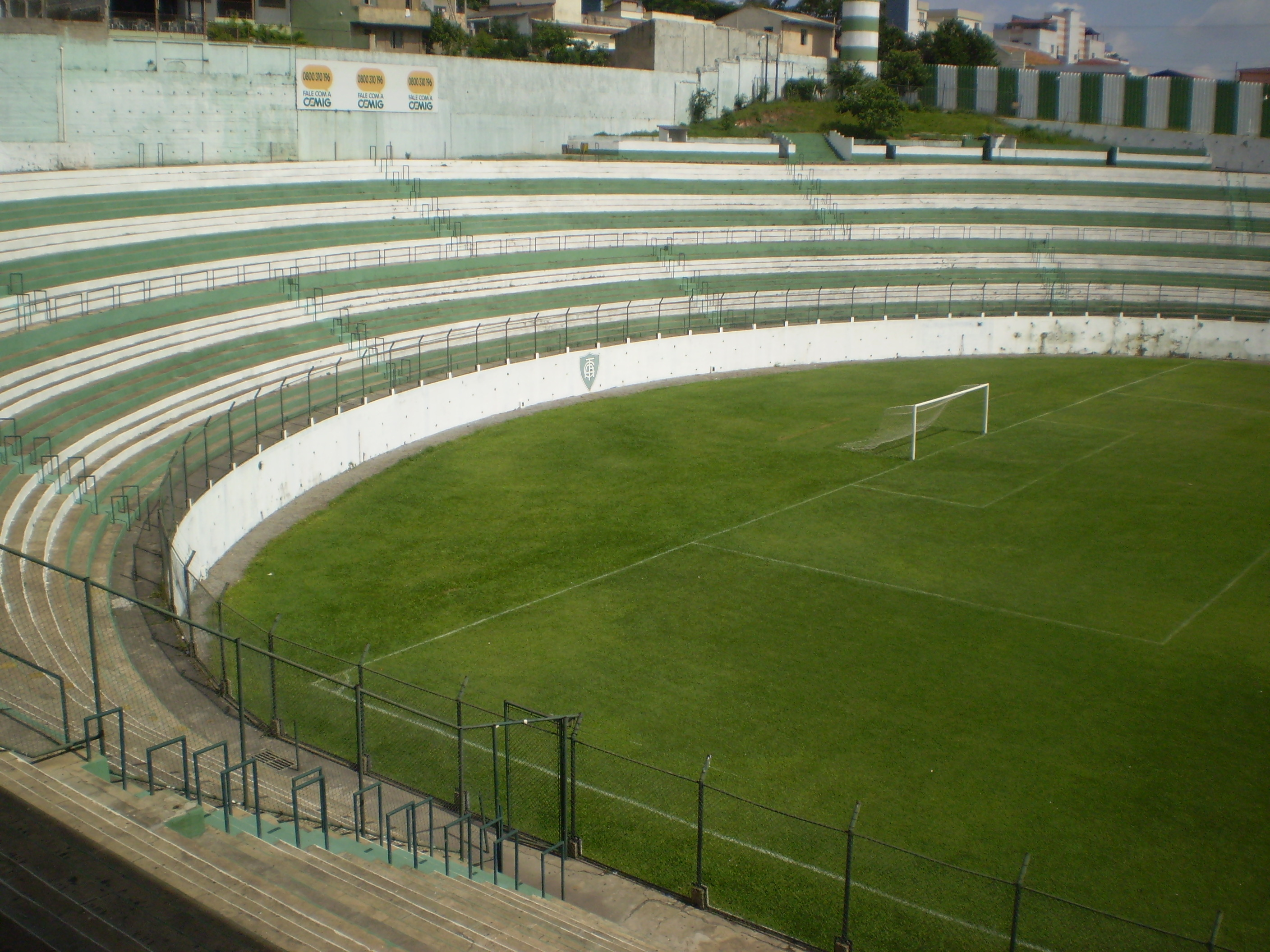
The stadium prior to 2010 renovation

Construction started in 1947 in preparation for the 1950 FIFA World Cup. The inaugural match was between Yugoslavia and Switzerland, won by the former 3–0, on 25 June 1950 at the World Cup. The first stadium goal was scored by Tomasevic. One of the most famous upsets in FIFA World Cup history was played here, the 1–0 upset by the United States over England at that 1950 World Cup.

After the construction of Mineirão, ownership of the stadium was transferred by the Minas Gerais government to Sete de Setembro.

Originally the stadium belonged to the Government of Minas Gerais, but with the inauguration of Mineirão in 1965, it became the property of the club Sete de Setembro (the reason the stadium is popularly known as "Independence", according to the historical date). With the merger of this club with América, the latter became the owner. At this stage América won the Campeonato Brasileiro Série B in 1997 in the confrontation against Vila Nova-GO and in a match against Náutico. For the final phase, 18,900 paying fans attended. América also won at that stage the Brazilian Series C Championship in 2009.

In 1999, in partnership with Atlético, América built a metal-structure grandstand, increasing the stadium capacity to about 30,000 people, plus an electronic scoreboard. Owing to a lack of proper security, this grandstand was deactivated shortly thereafter. The end of the partnership also resulted in the removal of the scoreboard. Independência already served as a venue for music festivals, such as Pop Rock Brazil and the Axé Brazil.

The attendance record is 32,721 spectators, set in the match between Minas Gerais and Guanabara (Carioca), won by Minas Gerais 1–0, and played on 27 January 1963, it was the first final match of the 1962 Campeonato Brasileiro de Seleções Estaduais, played by state teams.

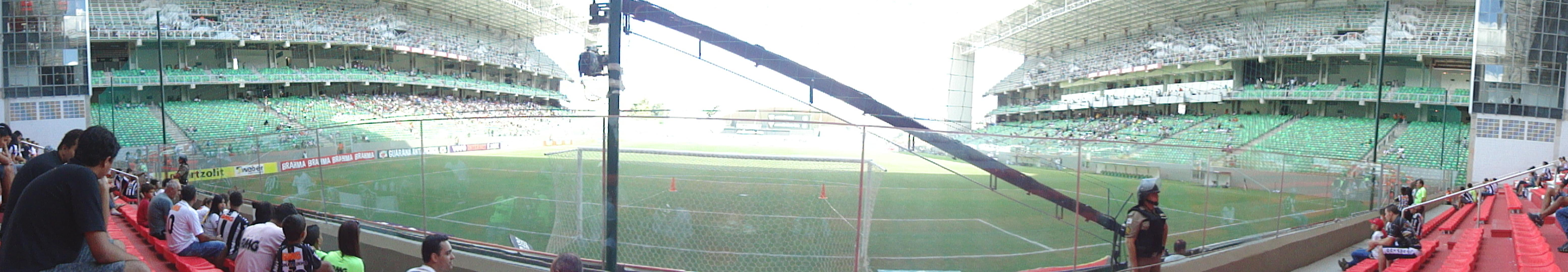
A panorama of Independência before a match

== Renovation ==
In 2010, Independência was demolished apart from its dressing rooms, and a brand new stadium was built in its place to host the games of Atlético Mineiro and América Mineiro while Mineirão went through renovations to host the 2014 FIFA World Cup. During the stadium's renovation, all three Belo Horizonte teams played in the Arena do Jacaré, located in nearby city Sete Lagoas. In 2012, the renovation was completed and América Mineiro returned to its original home venue, which is being also used to host games of Atlético Mineiro.

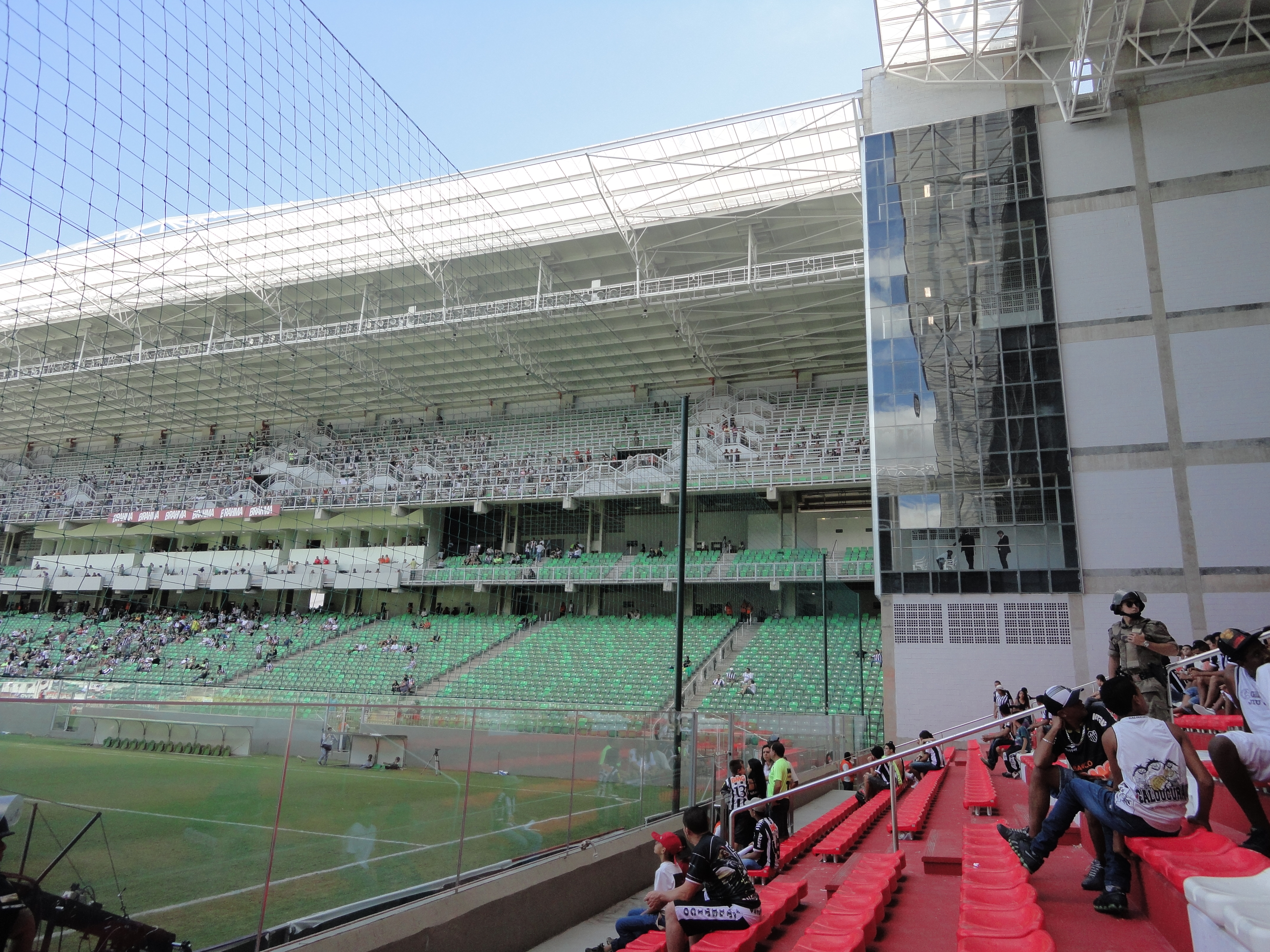
The stadium before a game

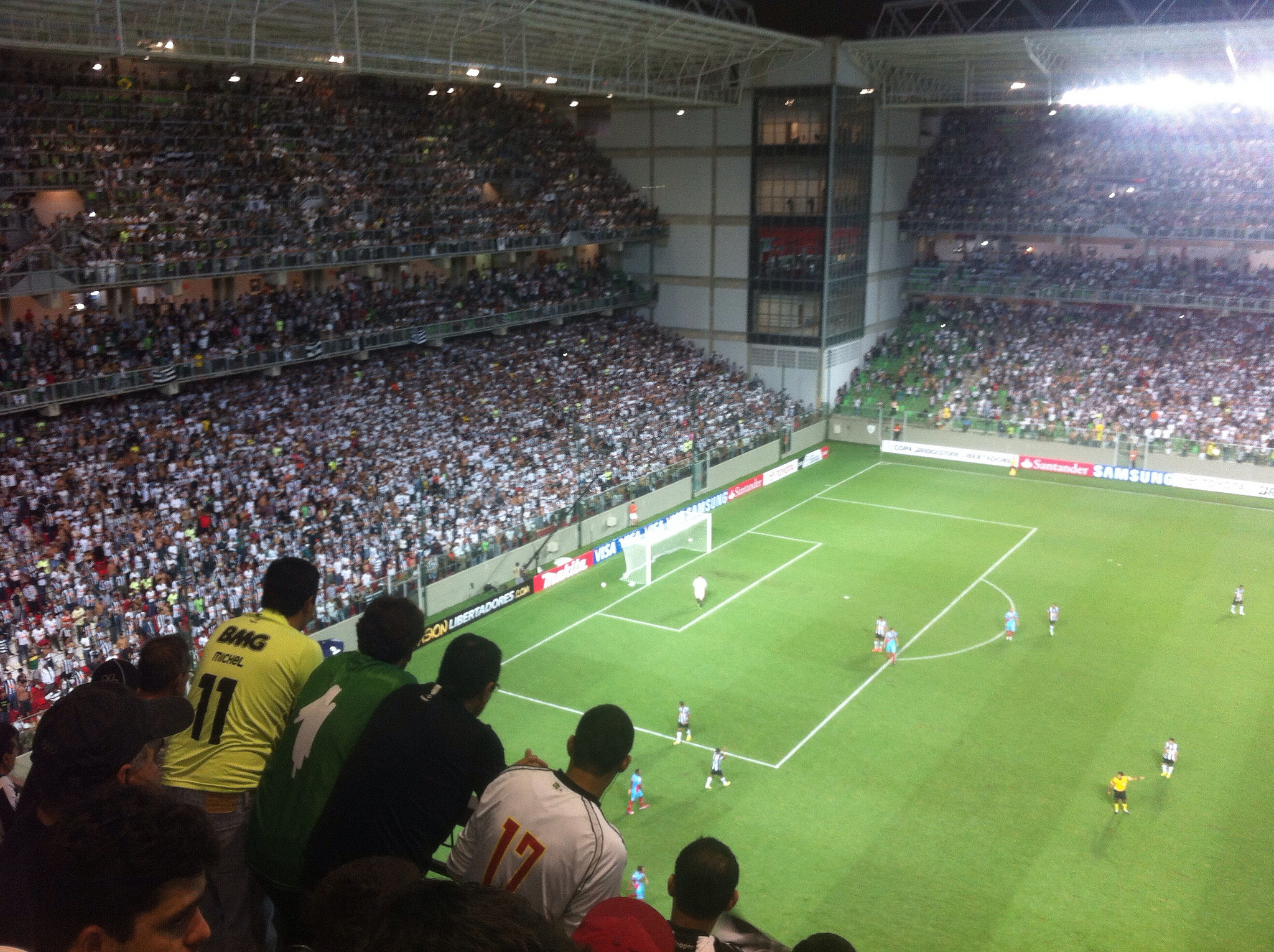
Atlético Mineiro v Arsenal de Sarandí, 2013

== 1950 FIFA World Cup ==
In the 1950 FIFA World Cup, the Independência hosted three matches in the group stage, including the notable upset United States vs England.

Date	Team #1	Res.	Team #2	Round	Spectators
25 June 1950	Yugoslavia	3–0	Switzerland	Group 1	7,336
19 June 1950	United States	1–0	England	Group 2	10,151
2 July 1950	Uruguay	8–0	Bolivia	Group 4	5,284
