= Cohen Stadium =

Former baseball stadium in El Paso, Texas

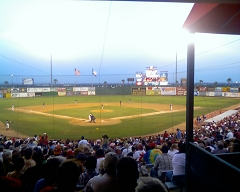

- Location within Texas Location within the United States
- Interactive map of Cohen Stadium
- Full name: Andy and Syd Cohen Stadium
- Address: 9700 Gateway North Blvd., El Paso, Texas
- Location: Northeast El Paso, Texas
- Coordinates: 31.891195°N 106.438272°W
- Owner: City of El Paso
- Capacity: 9,725
- Surface: Grass

Construction
- Opened: June 1990
- Renovated: 2003
- Demolished: June 5, 2019
- Cost: $7.8 million

Tenants
- El Paso Diablos (TL/CBL/AA) 1990–2013; El Paso Santos (PSL) 2012

Cohen Stadium was a stadium on the Northeast side of El Paso, Texas, by the Patriot Freeway, next to the Franklin Mountains. It replaced Dudley Field and has been replaced by Southwest University Park. It was primarily used for baseball, and was the home field of the El Paso Diablos minor league baseball team. It opened in 1990 and held 9,725 people. A demolition contract for the stadium was awarded on April 2, 2019, to be completed in 120 days. Demolition took place on Wednesday, June 5, 2019. The site will become the Cohen Entertainment District, featuring a water park, open spaces, shopping and restaurants.

The park was known as being an extremely hitter-friendly park, due to its high elevation, low humidity, and favorable wind currents toward the outfield. Primarily used for baseball, Cohen Stadium also hosted concerts, boxing, and soccer games. In 2012, it was home to the El Paso Santos minor-league soccer team playing from February until April, but despite being Pecos Soccer League (PSL) champions, they were displaced by the Diablos' departure.

Cohen Stadium was named for the former Major League Baseball players Andy Cohen and his brother Syd Cohen who grew up in El Paso.

In December 2009, the stadium's cement canopy was partially torn away by heavy winds in El Paso. Winds of the storm which caused the damage exceeded 70 mph.

World famous DJ Tiësto made an appearance at Cohen Stadium on May 6, 2011, with an estimated attendance of 10,000 people.

Cohen Stadium hosted the first annual Sun City Music Festival on September 3 and 4, 2011. The festival was dedicated to the world's largest electronic-dance music artists having headliners such as Armin van Buuren, Paul van Dyk, Afrojack, Funkagenda, Sander van Doorn among others. In 2012, SCMF was moved to Ascarate Park.

Events and tenants
Preceded by first venue	Host of the AAB All-Star Game; Cohen Stadium; 2006	Succeeded by Sioux Falls Stadium
