= Dimitar Popov =

Bulgarian footballer

Personal information
- Full name: Dimitar Nikolaev Popov
- Date of birth: 27 February 1970 (age 56)
- Place of birth: Sofia, Bulgaria
- Height: 1.93 m (6 ft 4 in)
- Position: Goalkeeper

Youth career
- 1979–1988: Levski Sofia

Senior career*
Years	Team	Apps	(Gls)
1988–1992	Levski Sofia	29	(0)
1992–1994	Botev Plovdiv	49	(0)
1994	Spartak Plovdiv	15	(0)
1995–1996	CSKA Sofia	42	(0)
1996–1997	Maritsa Plovdiv	28	(0)
1997–1998	Lokomotiv Sofia	24	(0)
1998–1999	Spartak Varna	17	(0)
2000–2005	El Paso Patriots	21	(0)
Total		225	(0)

International career
1993–1996	Bulgaria	14	(0)
- * Club domestic league appearances and goals

Dimitar Nikolaev Popov (Bulgarian: Димитър Николаев Попов; born 27 February 1970) is a former Bulgarian professional footballer who played as a goalkeeper.

== Career ==
In his career Popov played for Levski Sofia, Botev Plovdiv, Spartak Plovdiv, CSKA Sofia, Maritsa Plovdiv, Lokomotiv Sofia, Spartak Varna and El Paso Patriots. For the Bulgaria national football team, he participated at Euro 1996. Popov had 14 caps for the Bulgaria national football team in the period 1993-1997. In April 2000, he signed with the El Paso Patriots of the USISL.

== Honours ==
Levski Sofia

- Bulgarian Cup: 1990–91
