= Ben Crawley =

American soccer player (born 1971)

Personal information
- Date of birth: May 6, 1971 (age 55)
- Place of birth: Austin, Texas, United States
- Height: 5 ft 11 in (1.80 m)
- Position: Forward

College career
Years	Team	Apps	(Gls)
1989–1992	Virginia Cavaliers		

Senior career*
Years	Team	Apps	(Gls)
1990–1992	Austin Sockadillos		
1993–1994	TuS Celle		
1995	Richmond Kickers		
1996	D.C. United	5	(0)
1996	Richmond Kickers		
1997–1999	Austin Lone Stars		

International career
1986–1987	United States U16		
1988–1989	United States U20		
- * Club domestic league appearances and goals

Ben Crawley (born May 6, 1971) is an American retired soccer player. He was a member of the United States teams at both the 1987 FIFA U-16 World Championship and 1989 FIFA World Youth Championship but spent most of his professional career with lower division teams. He played five games in Major League Soccer with D.C. United in 1996.

== Club career ==
=== Youth ===
Crawley spent his early youth in Portland, Oregon, moving with his family to Austin, Texas when he was six. He spent his early years as a goalkeeper in the Capital Soccer Club, but was put on the front line as a freshman in high school. He was a 1989 Parade Magazine High School All American soccer player at Westlake High School. He attended the University of Virginia, playing on the men's soccer team from 1989 to 1992. He led the Cavaliers in scoring in 1990, 1991 and 1992, finishing his career with forty-seven goals and thirty-three assists. In 1992, he was selected as a First-Team All-American. Crawley and his teammates won the 1989, 1991 and 1992 NCAA Men's Soccer Championship.

=== Professional ===
In 1990, during the collegiate off-season, Crawley played for the Austin Sockadillos in the SISL outdoor league. He spent the 1991 with the Sockadillos as well. Following his graduation from Virginia in 1993, he signed with TuS Celle FC in the German Regionalliga Nord. In the fall of 1994, he had trials with the Baltimore Spirit and Wichita Wings of the National Professional Soccer League, but was not signed by either team for the regular season. On January 27, 1995, he signed with the Richmond Kickers in USISL where he was named a 1995 USISL All Star. In August 1995, the Kickers take the "double" when they win the league and 1995 U.S. Open Cup titles. On February 7, 1996, D.C. United selected Crawley in the tenth round (100th overall) in the 1996 MLS Inaugural Player Draft. He played five games for United. On June 8, 1996, D.C. sent him on loan to the Richmond Kickers, then waived him on June 30, 1996. He finished the season in Richmond. In 1997, he returned to the Austin Lone Stars in USISL. Crawley now coaches youth soccer at the River City Rangers Soccer Club, in Austin, Texas.

== International career ==
Crawley was a regular on the junior national teams during the late 1980s. In 1986, he joined the U-17 national team as it prepared for the 1987 FIFA U-16 World Championship. The team successfully made it through qualification and Crawley played all three U.S. games at the World Championship. On July 12, 1987, he scored the winning goal in the opening game for the U.S., a 1–0 win over Ecuador. But two losses put the team out of contention for a spot in the second round. In 1988, he moved up to the U-20 national team which qualified for the 1989 FIFA World Youth Championship. Crawley again played every game as the U.S. took fourth.
