= Andy Cohen (baseball) =

American baseball player, coach, and manager (1904–1988)

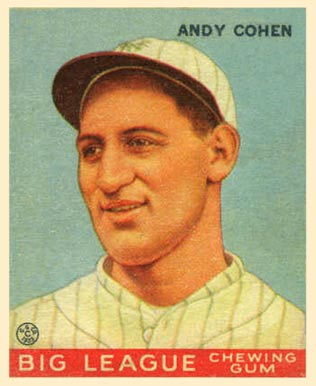
- Second baseman / Manager
- Born: October 25, 1904; Baltimore, Maryland, U.S.
- Died: October 29, 1988 (aged 84); El Paso, Texas, U.S.
- Batted: Right Threw: Right

MLB debut
- June 6, 1926, for the New York Giants

Last MLB appearance
- October 5, 1929, for the New York Giants

MLB statistics
- Batting average: .281
- Home runs: 14
- Runs batted in: 114
- Stats at Baseball Reference
- Managerial record at Baseball Reference

Teams
- As player: New York Giants (1926, 1928–1929); As manager: Philadelphia Phillies (1960)

Andrew Howard Cohen (October 25, 1904 – October 29, 1988), nicknamed the "Tuscaloosa Terror", was an American professional baseball player, coach, and manager. He played as a second baseman in Major League Baseball (MLB) for the New York Giants, from 1926 to 1929. Cohen was an interim manager for the Philadelphia Phillies in 1960.

== Early life ==
Cohen was born in Baltimore, Maryland, to Jewish parents who had been born in Europe. Though most sources give his full birth name as "Andrew Howard Cohen," a July 1928 profile published in The New York Times calls him "Andrew Jackson Cohen", citing his insistence on retaining his name despite pressure to change it, saying that "he had done pretty well up to then as Andrew Jackson Cohen and he would continue under that name", besides it would hurt his mother to play under an assumed name. He was the brother of Syd Cohen, who pitched in the major leagues from 1934 to 1937.

Cohen's family moved to El Paso, Texas, when he was four years old. Cohen was a star at El Paso High School in baseball, basketball, and football. He was awarded a scholarship to the University of Alabama, where he played all three sports for the Alabama Crimson Tide.

== Career ==
=== Minor leagues ===
Cohen left college early and signed a minor league contract to play in the Texas League. In 1925 Cohen batted .312 for Waco of the Texas League.

In 1927, he batted .353 for the Buffalo Bisons, with a .508 slugging percentage. In 1931 he batted .317 for Newark of the International League.

=== New York Giants ===
Cohen's success in the Texas League drew the attention of John McGraw, manager of the New York Giants, who had been looking to sign a Jewish player to help draw crowds to compete with the New York Yankees and Babe Ruth playing across the Harlem River. In May 1926, the Giants purchased Cohen's contract for $20,000 ($364,000 today) from the Waco team in the Texas League.

Cohen debuted in a May 31, 1926, game against the Philadelphia Phillies, with a pinch hit single to center field batting for Frankie Frisch, and an assist in the field. Cohen batted .257 in 32 games with the Giants in the 1926 season, with 9 hits (including a triple) in 35 at bats. Cohen played 10 games at second, 10 as shortstop, and two at third base. McGraw gave Cohen the option to stay with the team, but Cohen chose to be sent to Buffalo of the International League, where he would have an opportunity to be an everyday player.

The Sporting News wrote that he had: "all the natural characteristics (physically) of his race — thick, dark hair, dark skin and keen mentality."

With the slot at second base filled by Rogers Hornsby with the parent team, Cohen spent the 1927 season in Buffalo, with his .353 batting average leading the team to a league title. He was warmly welcomed by Buffalo's Jewish community, which held an "Andy Cohen Day" in which he was bestowed with gifts, including a diamond ring from fans and a black onyx ring from a jewelry store, among other gifts.

Hornsby had played 155 games at second base in the 1927 season, but he was traded by the Giants to the Boston Braves in January 1928, freeing up a slot for Cohen. With the Mayor of New York City, Jimmy Walker, on hand to throw out the first ball at the 1928 Opening Day game, Cohen led the Giants to a 5–3 victory over the Boston Braves, hitting two singles and a double, knocking in two runs, and scoring two. Thousands of fans rushed onto the field after the game and carried Cohen off the field on their shoulders. As the Giants' regular second baseman, Cohen had his best season in the major leagues in 1928, batting .274 with 24 doubles, 7 triples, and 9 home runs, as on defense he was fourth in the NL in double plays turned by a second baseman (90). The Giants played on his success on the field, with vendors selling "Ice Cream Cohens" in the concession stands at the Polo Grounds. The Los Angeles Times called the Giants' promotion of Cohen one of "the most efficient job of ballyhoo that has been performed in the sport industry..." Time magazine noted his popularity, reporting on a note from an adoring fan that read "I understand you are Jewish and single... if you would care to meet a brunette... Anyway drop me a little note...", one of hundreds Cohen said he had received.

He was part of a vaudeville act, telling jokes and singing parodies with Shanty Hogan, an Irish teammate from the Giants who played catcher for the team. After the 1928 season they started performing on the Loew Circuit, with their first appearance on stage at the Loew's Commodore Theatre in the Manhattan on October 15, 1928. The duo earned $1,800 ($338,000 today) a week, billed as "Cohen & Hogan" except in Boston, when the billings were reversed. In a 1960 interview, Cohen reminisced that "if we didn't kill vaudeville, we sure helped."

Cohen batted .294 in 101 games with the Giants in the 1929 season, hitting 12 doubles, two triples, and five home runs, while leading the league in range factor per nine innings by a second baseman (6.33), and playing what turned out to be his final major league game on October 5, 1929. The Giants sent Cohen to Newark during the 1929 season, to help refine Cohen's fielding. Cohen batted .318 and set an International League record with 59 consecutive errorless games. McGraw told Cohen that he would be called back up to the majors, and that day he broke his leg, never to play in the big leagues again.

=== After the major leagues ===
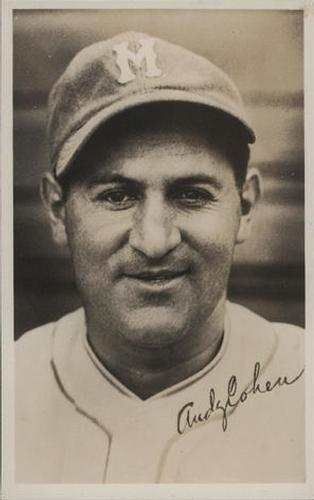
Cohen in 1932

Cohen played for the Newark Bears from 1929 until June 1932, when he was assigned to Minneapolis of the American Association. Despite the leg injury, Cohen led all International League second baseman in 1931 with a fielding percentage of .985, with 11 errors in 323 putouts and 412 assists, in addition to 66 double plays. With Minneapolis in 1933, Cohen led all American Association second basemen with a fielding percentage of .981 in 121 games.

Cohen was inducted into the United States Army on May 26, 1942, reporting to Fort Niagara. He was a first sergeant with the 21st Engineers, and saw action in Italy and Africa.

After the war, Cohen continued his career as a manager in the minor leagues. Cohen managed the Denver Bears, then of the Western League, from 1951 to 1954, leading the team to a championship in his final season. After Ralph Houk was named as a coach of the New York Yankees for the 1958 season, Cohen was chosen to fill Houk's spot as manager of the Denver Bears, then the Yankees' top minor league team in the American Association. He was a minor league manager after his playing career ended from 1939 to 1957.

In 1956–57, Cohen managed the Chesterfield Smokers of the Panamanian Professional Baseball League.

Cohen was also a coach with the Philadelphia Phillies in 1960. After manager Eddie Sawyer stepped down after losing the first game of the season, the Phillies hired Gene Mauch as his replacement, but had Cohen manage one game before Mauch could join the team, leading the Phillies to a 5–4 win in ten innings over the Milwaukee Braves. This was the only game Cohen ever managed in the major leagues, leaving him with a perfect record as a manager.

He returned to his hometown, where he coached the baseball team at the University of Texas at El Paso for 17 years.

Cohen died four days after his 84th birthday and 6 months after his brother Syd in El Paso, Texas on October 29, 1988.

In 1989, the El Paso Diablos moved into Cohen Stadium, a 9,725-seat stadium that was named in honor of Andy and his brother Syd.

== See also ==
- List of Jewish Major League Baseball players
