= Salvador Mercado =

Mexican footballer (born 1969)

Sal Mercado
Personal information
- Full name: Humberto Salvador Mercado-Luján
- Date of birth: March 25, 1969 (age 57)
- Place of birth: Mexico City, Mexico
- Height: 5 ft 9 in (1.75 m)
- Position: Midfielder

Senior career*
Years	Team	Apps	(Gls)
1990–1994	Cobras		
1994	El Paso Patriots	18	(20)
1994–1996	Atlético Celaya		
1995	→ El Paso Patriots (loan)		
1996	El Paso Patriots		
1996–1997	Guadalajara	4	(0)
1997–1998	Veracruz	19	(1)
1999	El Paso Patriots	9	(4)
2000	Atlético Celaya	2	(0)
2001	Ciudad Juarez		
2001	El Paso Patriots	18	(0)
2004	El Paso Patriots	14	(5)
2007	El Paso Patriots	4	(0)

Managerial career
- 2007: El Paso Patriots
- * Club domestic league appearances and goals

Humberto Salvador Mercado-Luján (born 25 March 1969) is a retired Mexican football midfielder who played professionally in Mexico and the United States.

Mercado began his professional career with Cobras de Ciudad Juárez. His first match was on 10 March 1991. In the summer of 1994, Mercado spent the Mexican off-season with the El Paso Patriots of the USISL. In 1994, he moved to Atlético Celaya. In 1995, he went on loan to El Paso which finished runner-up to the Richmond Kickers in the 1995 U.S. Open Cup final. In 1996, he again spent the summer with the Patriots. In the winter of 1996, Mercado signed with C.D. Guadalajara. He was out for most of the season due to an injury, but played a handful of games as the Chivas won the Torneo Verano. He then transferred to Tiburones Rojos de Veracruz. After missing the 1998 summer season with the Patriots, Mercado returned to El Paso in 1999. In 2000, Mercado began the season with Atlético Celaya, but finished it with Ciudad Juarez. In 2001 and 2004, he again spent the summers with the Patriots. In 2001, they played in the USL A-League but by 2004, they were in the USL Premier Development League. In 2007, he coached the Patriots.
