= Gabino Amparán =

Mexican football manager (born 1968)

Personal information
- Full name: Gabino Amparán Martínez
- Date of birth: October 9, 1968 (age 58)
- Place of birth: Ciudad Cuauhtémoc, Chihuahua, Mexico
- Height: 1.70 m (5 ft 7 in)
- Position: Defender

Senior career*
Years	Team	Apps	(Gls)
1990–1992	Cobras de Ciudad Juárez		
1995–1996	El Paso Patriots		
1999	Atlético Yucatán		

Managerial career
- 2009: Indios de Ciudad Juárez (interim)
- 2010–2011: Indios de Ciudad Juárez
- 2012: Estudiantes Tecos (Assistant)
- 2018: Potros UAEM (Assistant)
- 2019: Juárez Reserves and Academy
- 2020: Juárez (Women)
- * Club domestic league appearances and goals

Gabino Amparán Martínez (born October 9, 1968), is a Mexican football manager of Indios de Ciudad Juárez.
