= Carsten Siersbaek =

Danish footballer (born 1974)

Personal information
- Date of birth: March 27, 1974 (age 52)
- Place of birth: Fredericia, Denmark
- Height: 5 ft 8 in (1.73 m)
- Positions: Forward; midfielder

Senior career*
Years	Team	Apps	(Gls)
1994	Washington Warthogs (indoor)	9	(9)
1994	Baltimore Bays		
1995–1997	Colorado Foxes		(13)
1997–1998	Wichita Wings (indoor)	2	(3)
1998–1999	Aarhus Fremad	16	(2)
- * Club domestic league appearances and goals

Carsten Siersbaek is a former Denmark association football player who played professionally in the United States and Denmark.

In 1994, Siersbaek joined the Washington Warthogs of the Continental Indoor Soccer League. At the end of the season, he joined the Baltimore Bays for the end of the USISL season. In 1995, Siersbaek moved up to the Colorado Foxes of the A-League. He remained with the Foxes through the 1997 season. On November 25, 1997, the Wichita Wings of the National Professional Soccer League signed Siersback. In February 1998, Siersback scored a goal in a Colorado Rapids exhibition victory over Columbus Crew. The Rapids released him during the pre-season. Siersbaek then returned to Denmark and played for Aarhus Fremad during the 1998-1999 season.
