= Mexican National League =

The Mexican National League was a professional baseball circuit that operated briefly in 1946. It was officially ranked as a Class B league in Organized Baseball and included six clubs that represented the cities of Mexico, Chihuahua, Ciudad Juárez, El Paso, Saltillo, and Torreón–Gómez Palacio.

But it was to be a short-lived experiment because of a strong competition from an independent Mexican League, created by a multi-millionaire Jorge Pasquel, who attempted to turn his baseball circuit into a first-rate rival to the Major Leagues, which forced the Class B regional league to fold.

As a result, the Mexico and Torreón-Gómez Palacio clubs disbanded in late April and the Mexican National League closed its operations on May 27. By then, the Ciudad Juárez and Chihuahua teams were tied in first place with an identical record of 23 wins and 21 losses.

== List of teams ==
The following is a list of teams that participated in the only season of the Mexican National League.

- Dorados de Chihuahua
- El Paso Texans
- Indios de Ciudad Juárez
- Laguneros de Torreón-Gómez Palacios – folded on 27 April 1946
- Mexico City Aztecs – folded on 27 April 1946
- Peroneros de Saltillo

== Sources ==
- Johnson, Lloyd; Wolff, Miles (1993). Encyclopedia of Minor League Baseball. Baseball America. ISBN 978-0-96-371898-3
