= El Paso Patriots =

- Full name: El Paso Patriots Soccer Club.
- Nickname: The Patriots
- Founded: 1989
- Dissolved: 2013
- Stadium: SISD Student Activities Complex; El Paso, Texas
- Capacity: 11,000
- Owner: Enrique Cervantes
- Head Coach: Javier McDonald
- League: Premier Development League
- 2013: 6th, Mid South; Playoffs: DNQ
- Website: http://elpasopatriots.com/
Home colors	Away colors

El Paso Patriots was an American soccer team based in El Paso, Texas, United States. Founded in 1989, the team played in the Premier Development League (PDL), the fourth tier of the American Soccer Pyramid, in the Mid South Division of the Southern Conference.

The team played its home games at the soccer-specific Patriot Stadium, where they played since 2005 until 2012, when they played their last season (2013) home schedule at the SAC. The team's colors were red, navy blue and white.

Prior to their stadium being completed in 2005, the Patriots played at the Sun Bowl on the campus of the University of Texas at El Paso, and at Dudley Field, the former home of the El Paso Diablos baseball team. They were one of the more long-serving franchises in American soccer, having previously played in the first division A-League until 2003.

== History ==
Founded in 1989 as the El Paso Sixshooters and owned and coached by Dan Guard, the team competed in the Southwest Indoor Soccer League. The season was a disaster from the start, as they allowed 179 goals in 12 games (including a 27-3 blowout against the Austin Sockadillos) while scoring only 44. (Fittingly, the infamous footballer/con artist Carlos Kaiser was listed on the El Paso roster, but never got in a game.) In January 1990, the 0-12 Sixshooters (who drew about 300 fans total to two home contests at the El Paso County Coliseum) ceased operations and forfeited their remaining games, finishing with an official record of 0-24.

The team resumed operations in the fall of 1990 as the El Paso Spurs. Before the 1991 season, the Spurs were sold to a group which included primary investor Enrique Cervantes as well as Jaime Monardes. The new ownership group renamed the team the Patriots to capitalize on the Patriot missile's recent success in the Gulf War and hired Brazilian Marinho Chagas as head coach. In 2003, the team played in the Sun Bowl.

Prior to the 2010 PDL season the Patriots signed a formal agreement with Mexican Premier Division team Guadalajara, and were officially rebranded as the Chivas El Paso Patriots. In addition to cross-promotion, sponsorship and player development, the agreement will also see the U-20, Division 1A and Division II Chivas teams playing regular games in El Paso. In 2012, the club rebranded to their original name El Paso Patriots.

== Players ==
=== Notable former players ===
This list of notable former players comprises players who went on to play professional soccer after playing for the team in the Premier Development League, or those who previously played professionally before joining the team.

- (Brazil) Carlos Kaiser (footballer)
- (England) Ben Everson
- (Chile) Carlos Farias
- (Mexico) Julio Daniel Frías
- (United States) Freddy Juarez
- (Paraguay) Cesar Sosa
- (Mexico) Salvador Mercado
- (Bulgaria) Dimitar Popov
- (United States) Steve Sengelmann
- (Bulgaria) Dimitar Vasev

== Year-by-year ==
Year	Division	League	Regular season	Playoffs	Open Cup
1989/90	N/A	SISL Indoor	4th, Cactus	did not qualify	N/A
1990/91	N/A	SISL Indoor	8th, Southwest	did not qualify	N/A
1991	N/A	SISL	2nd, Southwest	Semifinals	did not enter
1992	N/A	USISL	1st, Southwest	did not qualify	did not enter
1993	N/A	USISL	6th, Atlantic	Sizzling Six	did not enter
1994	3	USISL	2nd, Southwest	Divisional Semifinals	did not enter
1995	3	USISL Pro League	1st, South Central	Divisional Finals	Final
1996	3	USISL Select League	3rd, Pacific	1st Round	2nd Round
1997	2	USISL A-League	6th, Pacific	did not qualify	did not qualify
1998	2	USISL A-League	6th, Central	did not qualify	3rd Round
1999	2	USL A-League	5th, Pacific	Conference Quarterfinals	did not qualify
2000	2	USL A-League	4th, Pacific	Conference Quarterfinals	did not qualify
2001	2	USL A-League	7th, Western	did not qualify	3rd Round
2002	2	USL A-League	2nd, Pacific	1st Round	did not qualify
2003	2	USL A-League	3rd, Central	did not qualify	3rd Round
2004	4	USL PDL	1st, Mid South	Conference Semifinals	did not qualify
2005	4	USL PDL	1st, Mid South	National Final	2nd Round
2006	4	USL PDL	3rd, Mid South	did not qualify	did not qualify
2007	4	USL PDL	2nd, Mid South	Conference Semifinals	2nd Round
2008	4	USL PDL	3rd, Mid South	did not qualify	did not qualify
2009	4	USL PDL	4th, Mid South	did not qualify	2nd Round
2010	4	USL PDL	5th, Mid South	did not qualify	did not qualify
2011	4	USL PDL	2nd, Mid South	Conference Semifinals	1st Round
2012	4	USL PDL	3rd, Mid South	did not qualify	2nd Round
2013	4	USL PDL	6th, Mid South	did not qualify	did not qualify

== Honors ==
- USL PDL Southern Conference Champions 2005
- USL PDL Mid South Division Champions 2005
- USL PDL Mid South Division Champions 2004
- USISL Pro League South Central Division Champions 1995
- US Open Cup Runners-Up 1995
- USISL Southwest Division Champions 1992

== Head coaches ==
- (United States) Dan Guard (1989–1990)
- (Brazil) Marinho Chagas (1991–1992)
- Oscar Lira (1993–1994-1995)
- (Mexico) Francisco Paco Chavez (1996–1999)
- (United States) Greg Petersen (2000)
- Alfredo Solares (2001 – interim)
- (Mexico) Carlos Bracamontes (beginning July 2, 2001)
- (Brazil) Tita (2002)
- (Mexico) Miguel Murillo (2002, 2008)
- (Mexico) Fernando Gutierrez (2003)
- (United States) Jesus Enriquez (2002–2003-2004–2005–2006)
- (Mexico) Salvador Mercado (2007)
- (Mexico) Javier McDonald (2008 interim)

== Stadium ==
- Sun Bowl Stadium; El Paso, Texas (2003)
- Dudley Field; El Paso, Texas (2004)
- Gary Del Palacios Field (Patriot Stadium); El Paso, Texas (2005–2012)
- SISD Student Activities Complex; El Paso, Texas (2013)

In May 2005, the Patriots opened their own stadium at their training facility near Cielo Vista Mall.

== Average attendance ==
Attendance stats are calculated by averaging each team's self-reported home attendances from the historical match archive at https://web.archive.org/web/20100105175057/http://www.uslsoccer.com/history/index_E.html.

- 2004: 986 (5th in PDL)
- 2005: 1,546 (2nd in PDL)
- 2006: 867 (7th in PDL)
- 2007: 789 (8th in PDL)
- 2008: 1,269 (5th in PDL)
- 2009: 607 or 640 (17th in PDL)
- 2010: 1,069 or 1,094 (9th in PDL)
- 2011: 1,067 (8th in PDL)
- 2012: 444 (23rd in PDL)
