= Syd Cohen =

American baseball player

- Pitcher
- Born: May 7, 1906; Baltimore, Maryland, U.S.
- Died: April 9, 1988 (aged 81); El Paso, Texas, U.S.
- Batted: Switch Threw: Left

MLB debut
- September 18, 1934, for the Washington Senators

Last MLB appearance
- September 9, 1937, for the Washington Senators

MLB statistics
- Win–loss record: 3–7
- Earned run average: 4.54
- Strikeouts: 49
- Stats at Baseball Reference

Teams
- Washington Senators (1934, 1936–1937)

Sydney Harry Cohen (May 7, 1906 – April 9, 1988) was an American pitcher in Major League Baseball.

== Career ==
Cohen was Jewish. He was the brother of second baseman Andy Cohen. Cohen Stadium in El Paso, Texas, is named after the two brothers.

Cohen went to Alta Vista Elementary School. He then went to El Paso High School, where he played baseball and basketball, and was captain of the basketball teams that went to the state finals in his junior and senior years (1925 and 1926). He then attended the University of Alabama, and subsequently signed to play professional baseball in 1928 with the San Francisco Seals of the West Coast League.

He pitched for the Washington Senators from 1934 to 1937. In 1934, he gave up Babe Ruth's 708th home run, his last as a member of the New York Yankees. In 1937 when he had a 3.11 ERA in 33 games, his four saves were fourth in the American League, as were his 21 games finished. He managed in the minor leagues for many years afterward and died in El Paso, Texas, at age 81 .
