= Erik Storkson =

American soccer player

Personal information
- Date of birth: July 31, 1968 (age 58)
- Place of birth: Boise, Idaho, United States
- Height: 6 ft 2 in (1.88 m)
- Position: Forward

Youth career
- 1988–1989: Green River Community College

Senior career*
| Years | Team | Apps | (Gls) |
| 1993–1994 | Seattle Storm | | |
| 1994 | Seattle Sounders | 1 | (0) |
| 1995–1997 | Seattle Hibernian | | |
| 1995 | Seattle Sounders | 1 | (0) |
| 1997 | New Orleans Riverboat Gamblers | 1 | (0) |
| 1997–2001 | Seattle Sounders | 68 | (18) |
- * Club domestic league appearances and goals

Erik Storkson is a retired American soccer forward who spent most of his career with the Seattle Sounders in the A-League.

Although born in Idaho, Storkson grew up in Renton, Washington. In 1988, Storkson graduated from Lindbergh High School. That fall, he entered Green River Community College where he was part of the school's Washington state championship soccer team. In 1993, Storkson played for the Seattle Storm in the Pacific Coast Soccer League. In June 1994, Storkson signed with the Seattle Sounders. The Sounders released him without him entering a game. On September 2, 1994, Storkson rejoined the Sounders, playing one game. In 1995, Storkson joined Seattle Hibernian, also in the PCSL. He also played one game for the Sounders. Storkson spent most of the 1997 season with the Hibernian Saints, although he did play one game for the New Orleans Riverboat Gamblers. On August 14, 1997, Storkson signed with the Sounders for the upcoming A-League playoffs. He remained with the Sounders through the 2001 season. He lost much of the 2000 season after injuring his foot during a U.S. Open Cup game in June 2000. Storkson also spent nearly thirty-six years as a coach for various high schools in Washington State. He was the 2002 Seamount League Coach of the Year.
