= El Paso Zoo =

El Paso Zoo and Botanical Garden
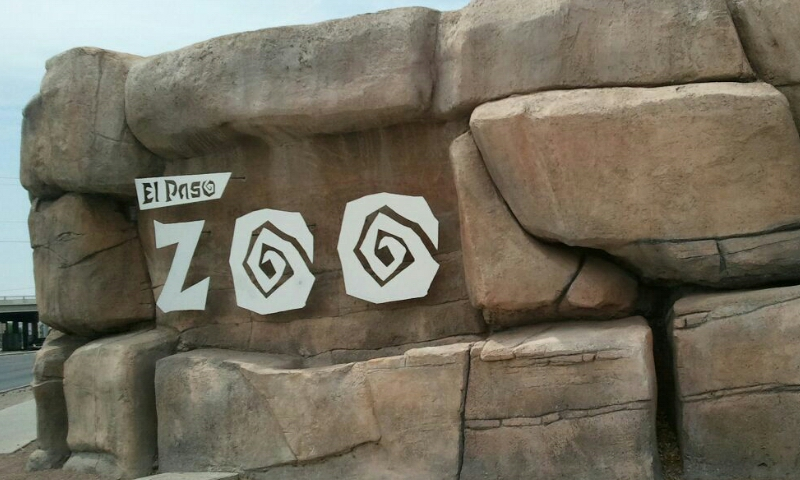
- Interactive map of El Paso Zoo and Botanical Garden
- 31.7684°N 106.4429°W
- Location: El Paso, Texas, United States
- Land area: 35 acres (14 ha)
- No. of species: 200+
- Website: www.elpasozoo.org

The El Paso Zoo is a zoo located in El Paso, Texas, United States. The 35-acre (14 ha) facility houses over 200 species, including the critically endangered animals.

== Zoo sections ==
The El Paso Zoo, formerly the Washington Park Zoo, is a 35-acre (14 ha) facility that houses over 200 species, including the critically endangered animals. The El Paso Zoo contains animals in four major areas – Animals of Africa, Animals of Asia, Animals of the Americas, and Animals of the Chihuahuan Desert.

The Animals of Africa section was opened in March 2010 with African lion and meerkat exhibits. In November 2010, it was further expanded with eight new antelope species, including kudu, topi antelopes and Thomson's gazelles. The Animals of Africa section also includes Red River hog, giraffe, zebra, grey crowned crane, Cape teal, Egyptian geese, spur-winged geese, and radiated tortoises.

The Animals of Asia section highlights animals of that continent, including Sumatran orangutans, Malayan tapirs, Siamang gibbons, lion-tailed macaques, Malayan tigers, Malayan sun bears, and Przewalski's horses. The indoor Asian Forest Complex is home to small mammals like the Prevost's squirrel and slow loris, as well as birds including hooded cranes, pink pigeons, rhinoceros hornbill, white-eyed ducks, Bali myna, black-naped fruit dove, bleeding heart pigeon, Nicobar pigeon, and yellow-vented bulbuls. The building is also home to a Burmese python and goldfish. A male Indian rhinoceros was introduced to this zoo in December 2023.

The Animals of the Americas section contains exhibits of a variety of animals from the Americas including a sea lion program, the South American Pavilion, and a spider monkey exhibit. The Animals of the Chihuahuan Desert section contains exhibits of a variety of animals native to that region, including: Mexican gray wolves, Peninsular pronghorn, white-nosed coati, collared peccary, jaguars, and mountain lions.

== Conservation ==
In November 2010, the zoo sent a female Mexican gray wolf to Tenino, Washington, to be bred with a male wolf. The wolves were selected by a panel of experts as part of an effort to save the species from extinction. It was estimated that year that 40 Mexican grey wolves were left in the wild.

== Gallery ==
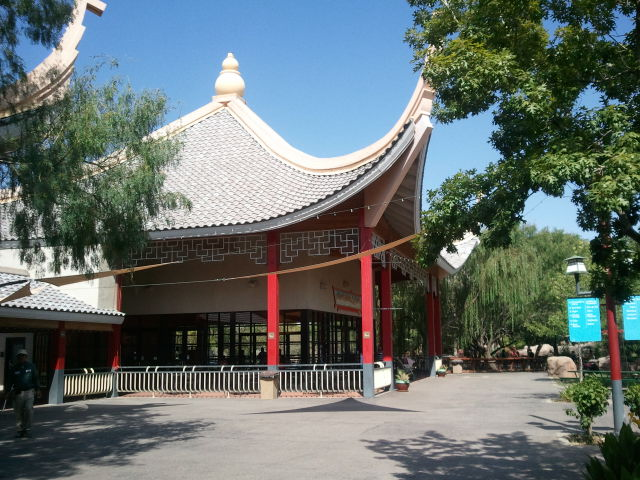
Animals of Asia entrance

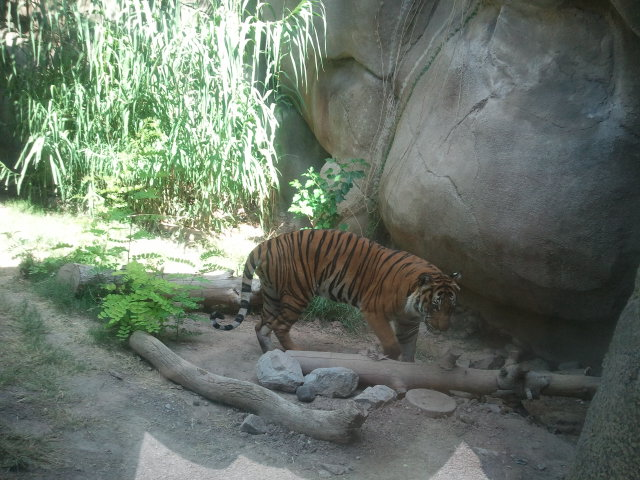
Asian tiger

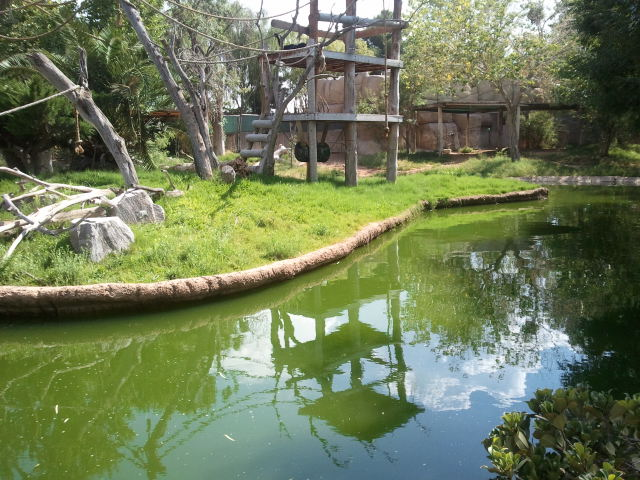
Spider monkey exhibit

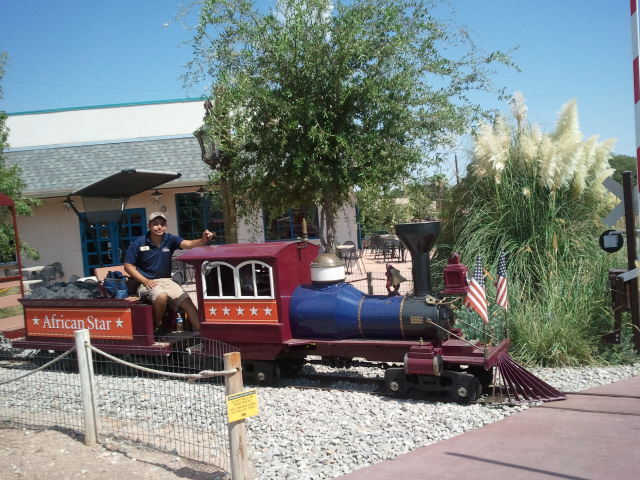
El Paso Zoo train

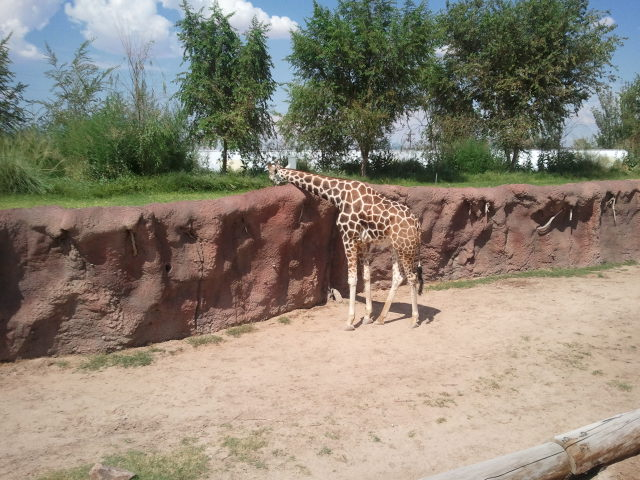
African giraffe

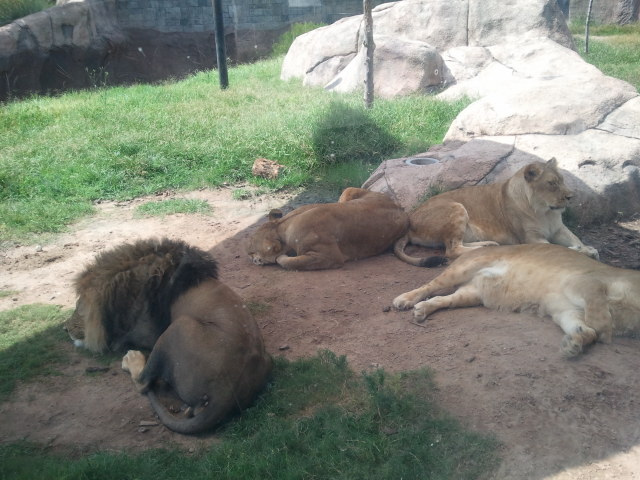
African lions

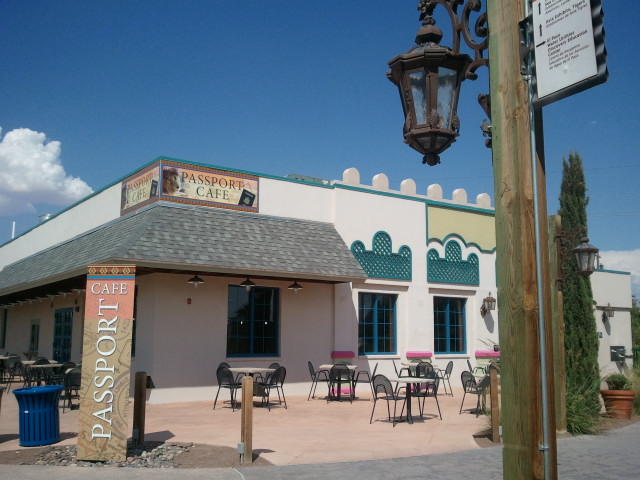
Passport Cafe

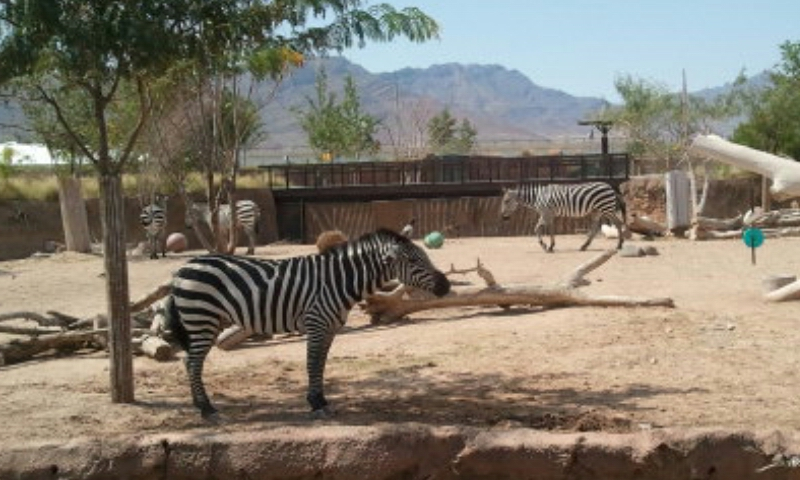
Zebra at the Africa exhibit

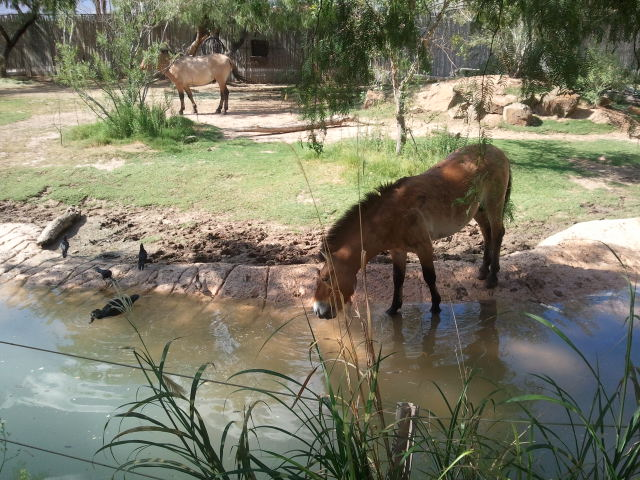
Przewalski's horse

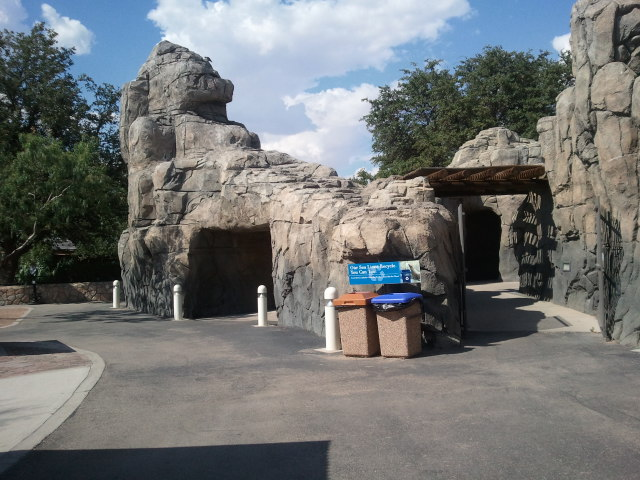
Outside the Sea Lion Exhibit

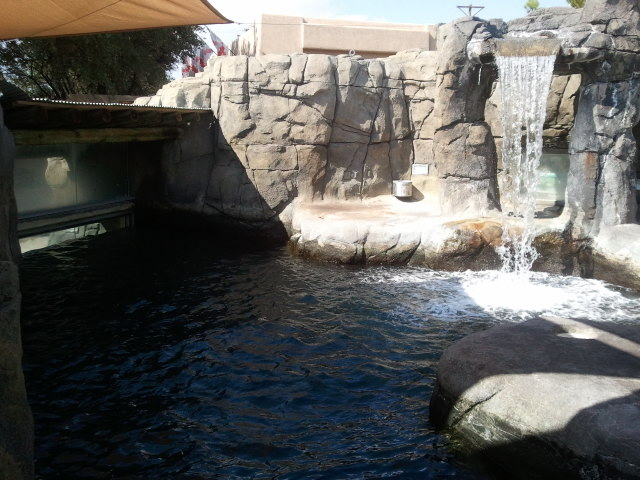
El Paso Electric Sea Lion Amphitheater

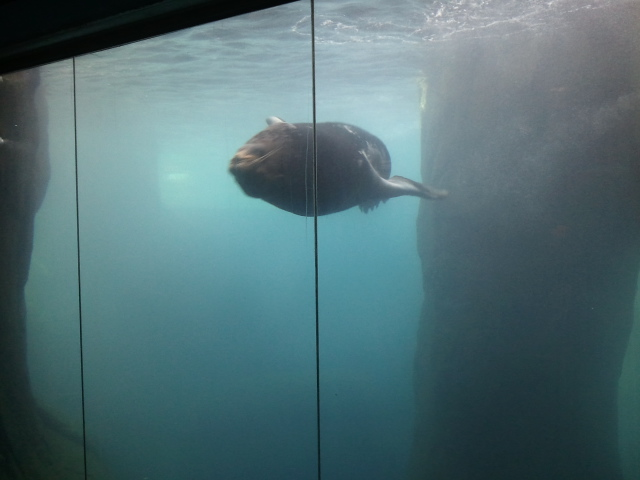
Sunny the sea lion
