= Horto =

Community in Rio de Janeiro, Brazil

Coordinates: 22°58′00″S 43°14′16″W

Horto is a community of 621 families in the South Zone of Rio de Janeiro. It is not officially recognized as a neighborhood. It is located in Jardim Botânico, near Gávea, and Lagoa. The property is worth an estimated $3.29 billion.

The community was first established in 1808 when King João VI invited the slaves and workers building the botanical garden to live on the property. Employees of the garden along with their families and descendants have lived there ever since. During the 2016 Rio Olympics residents of Horto were served with eviction notices; with the Garden claiming the land was needed for a research institute. The residents felt they were being evicted due to being poor black people in a wealthy neighborhood; and no arrangements have been made for them to receive compensation or alternate housing. Residents are planning to resist the evictions, much the way the residents of Vila Autódromo also resisted the destruction of their favela.
